= Commission on Pseudoscience =

Russian scientific organisation

- Commission on Pseudoscience of Russian Academy of Sciences
- Комиссия по борьбе с лженаукой
- Formation: 1998; 28 years ago
- Type: Governmental
- Headquarters: Moscow, Russia
- Members: 59 (2016)
- Chairman: Eugene Alexandrov
- Parent organization: Russian Academy of Sciences
- Website: klnran.ru/en/

The Commission on Pseudoscience (Russian: Комиссия по борьбе с лженаукой) is a Russian scientific organization under the Presidium of the Russian Academy of Sciences, created on the initiative of Vitaly Ginzburg in 1998. Until 2018, the organization was a member of the Commission on Pseudoscience and Falsification of Scientific Research, since 2018 it has been independent. The commission's task is to promote scientific knowledge and counter the discrediting of science and pseudoscientific activity.

== History ==
The prerequisite for the emergence in the structure of the Russian Academy of Sciences (RAS) of a separate body focused on countering the spread of pseudoscientific theories was their widespread distribution in Russia in the 1990s. Unproven theories were popular even in the highest echelons of power: in the book Scientists from the Highway, Academician of the RAS and future chairman of the Commission on Pseudoscience and Falsification of Scientific Research Eduard Kruglyakov described the case when then Russia's president Boris Yeltsin's security guard Alexander Korzhakov introduced Yeltsin to the author of research on obtaining energy from stone, and Yeltsin approved the allocation of 120 million rubles to the "inventor", despite the protest of the scientific community. It is known from biographical materials that Yeltsin also believed in psychics, and Korzhakov's first deputy, Georgy Rogozin, provided the president's occult protection.

Publications about the living dead, torsion fields and other pseudoscientific theories were published in major Russian media outlets, and even in the government newspaper Rossiyskaya Gazeta (RG). Kruglyakov wrote a response article, but due to criticism of the then head of the RG science department, Albert Valentinov, the response article was not published for a long time, despite complaints to the editor-in-chief. The article was published only after Kruglyakov's letter to the Deputy Minister of Science, but it was accompanied by a detailed commentary by Valentinov, in which he accused Kruglyakov of using administrative resources. The future Nobel laureate Vitaly Ginzburg in 1998 proposed to the President of the RAS Yury Osipov to create a special commission on pseudoscience. By pseudoscience, Ginzburg understood "all sorts of constructions and hypotheses that contradict firmly established scientific facts."

The Commission on Pseudoscience and Falsification of Scientific Research was formed by the decree of the Presidium of the Russian Academy of Sciences No. 58-A dated March 16, 1999; Kruglyakov became its first chairman. Despite wide support in the RAS, the commission did not receive funding and any instruments of influence, except for the opportunity to officially criticize unscientific inventions and theories on behalf of the scientific community. Kruglyakov headed the commission until his death in 2012, after which physicist Eugene Alexandrov became chairman.

In 2018, the Presidium of the RAS approved the division of the Commission on Pseudoscience and Falsification of Scientific Research into two independent commissions: one continues to fight against pseudoscience, the second counteracts falsification of scientific research.

== Activities and high-profile projects ==
The commission on behalf of the RAS publicly criticized pseudoscientific theories, opposed astrology, ufology, alternative medicine, and religion in science and education. The commission considered its main task to be the protection of the Russian budget from science-based projects claiming state funding. Since 2006, the commission has published the bulletin In Defence of Science (Russian: В защиту науки) twice a year before the general meetings of the RAS. Since 2014, publications on the problem of pseudoscience have been published on the commission's website – klnran.ru.

=== Petrik water filters ===
In 2006, Boris Gryzlov, Speaker of the State Duma and Chairman of the Supreme Council of United Russia, launched the Clean Water party project, which was designed to increase the availability of high-quality drinking water. So, in schools, hospitals and kindergartens it was planned to introduce water filters, and the competition for their development was won by the self-proclaimed scientist and author of "sensational" discoveries Viktor Petrik. The media noted that Petrik was close to Gryzlov: he often visited his country house, and they also jointly owned patents for a water purification system. According to Petrik, his filters purified water from any impurities and even radiation. As part of the party program, Petrik filters were installed in kindergartens in Nizhny Novgorod, Gelendzhik and the Irkutsk region; further installation, according to the party's plan, was to be within the framework of the federal target program for a period until 2020 and total funding of up to 15 trillion rubles.

The scientific community was aware that Petrik filters are fiction, but in 2009 a number of RAS academicians publicly gave high marks to the "invention". As Aleksandr Sergeev, a member of the Commission on Pseudoscience and Falsification of Scientific Research, later asserted, the proposal to express support for Petrik came from above, and the academicians who supported the project met with Petrik at the request of Gryzlov. The incident caused a wide public outcry, and the head of the commission, academician Eduard Kruglyakov, led the fight against Petrik filters. In 2010, an expert group on the problem was created at the RAS, and studies have shown that water passed through Petrik filters is dangerous to health. The scandal, often referred to in the media as "Petrikgate", destroyed the reputation of a pseudo-scientist, and the installation of filters was excluded from the Clean Water programme. Initially, Gryzlov, who accused the commission of obscurantism and opposition to progress, had to publicly distance himself from Petrik. Petrik filed a lawsuit against the RAS and members of the commission, demanding a billion rubles in compensation, but the court dismissed the claim.

=== Non-working engines for Roscosmos ===
The commission has repeatedly opposed the projects of reactionless drive, which were proposed by various Russian inventors, including the state corporation for space activities – Roscosmos. In May 2008, as part of an experiment, a reactionless drive was installed on the Yubileiny educational satellite, which was co-authored by the deputy director of the Khrunichev State Scientific and Practical Center, General Valery Menshikov. The device, the principles of which contradicted the laws of physics, showed zero result during tests in space, receiving the nickname "gravitsapa" (Russian: гравицапа) in reference to a Soviet comedy film Kin-dza-dza!, and the commission managed to stop funding the project.

In 2019, the Commission on Pseudoscience also publicly criticized the cooperation of Roscosmos with agricultural engineer Vladimir Leonov, who announced the development of a theory and a prototype of a "quantum engine". Advisor to the General Director of Energia corporation Oleg Baklanov, member of the expert council of the State Duma Committee on Defense Mikhail Sautin and honoured tester of space technology Alexander Kubasov took part in testing of this "invention".

=== Memorandum Dermatoglyphics ===
In 2016, the Commission first tested the format of a memorandum, in which it expressed the opinion of the scientific community on the popular dermatoglyphics – the practice of studying patterns on the skin of the palms and feet and using them to determine, for example, personality traits and predispositions. In the memorandum, the commission recommended a wide range of readers not to use such commercial services and not to take the results already obtained seriously. As the co-author of the memorandum, popularizer of science and member of the commission Alexander Panchin later noted, thanks to the publication of the memorandum and the subsequent speech of the representatives of the commission in the Federation Council, it was possible to suppress the practice of dermatoglyphic testing, which was planned to be used in the selection of students to state educational institutions.

=== Memorandum Homeopathy ===
At the beginning of 2017, the commission issued a second memorandum – "Homeopathy as Pseudoscience". Its authors noted that, despite its 200-year history, the practice of "treatment with ultra-low doses" has no scientific basis and evidence of effectiveness, and its fundamental principles are contrary to the laws of chemistry, physics and biology. In the document, the commission recommended the Ministry of Health to withdraw homeopathic medicines from use in state clinics and introduce labeling about unproven effectiveness, the Federal Antimonopoly Service – to protect citizens from unfair advertising, pharmacies – to change the calculation so that traditional medicines do not coexist with homeopathy, and pharmacists – to stop recommending it to buyers. At first, the Ministry of Health promised to form a working group to discuss homeopathy and the requirements of evidence-based medicine, but in the end, the department did not fulfill any of the recommendations of the memorandum, even issued an order to simplify the rules for registering homeopathic remedies.

Not all RAS members agreed with the memorandum. For example, the former minister of health, vice president and head of the medical department of the RAS, Vladimir Starodubov, did not support restrictions on homeopathy, and the co-author of the memorandum, Denis Roshchin, was fired from the Central Research Institute of Organization and Informatization of Health Care, headed by Starodubov, the next day after publication of the memorandum. Even one of the members of the commission, academician and adviser to the RAS Sergei Kolesnikov, refused to work on the memorandum, and later publicly supported homeopathy in his speech at the Public Chamber. Lawsuits against the commission were filed by both homeopathic clinics and a large owner of a homeopathic business, corresponding member of the RAS Oleg Epshtein. Also, the National Council for Homeopathy (NCH) appealed to the prosecutor's office with a complaint that the memorandum was prepared with the support of the Evolution Foundation. NCH was outraged that the Evolution Foundation was not only created in 2015 by former members of the Dynasty Foundation, recognized as a foreign agent in Russia, but also enjoyed the support of the opposition leader Alexei Navalny.

However, the publication of the memorandum "Homeopathy as Pseudoscience" probably influenced the demand for homeopathic medicines. In the first 6 months of 2018, Russian pharmacies sold 500,000 fewer packs of homeopathic medicines than in the same period in 2017. Losses were incurred by the largest market players, for example, the company Materia Medica owned by RAS Corresponding Member Oleg Epstein (produces drugs Anaferon, Ergoferon, Tenoten and others) reduced profits by half a billion rubles – from 1.9 to 1.4 billion. In 2017, Materia Medica Holding even received a special Anti-Prize at the annual competition For Loyalty to Science. In response, in 2018, the Ministry of Education and Science did not mark any anti-merit in popularizing scientific achievements.

=== Fundamentals of Orthodoxy in the curriculum ===
The Commission on Pseudoscience was also occupied by the struggle against the clericalization of society, the penetration of the church into the system of state education. In 2007, a Letter from Ten Academicians was published – an open appeal to Russia's President Vladimir Putin. In the text, under which the commission members Alexandrov, Alferov, Ginzburg, Kruglyakov and others left their signatures, for the first time the topic of the growing influence of the Russian Orthodox Church (ROC) on the life of society was raised. Scientists criticized the study of the foundations of Orthodox culture in schools and the specialty "theology" that appeared in the Higher Attestation Commission. However, the letter did not produce noticeable results. In 2012, the subject "Fundamentals of Religious Cultures and Secular Ethics" was included in the school curriculum, and in January 2015, the Higher Attestation Commission approved theology as a new specialty.

=== Sergei Konovalov, an employee of the Russian Academy of Medical Sciences ===
Since 2013, the commission began to receive inquiries about the healing practice of an employee of the Russian Academy of Medical Sciences (RAMS), Doctor of Medical Sciences Sergei Konovalov. Academician Alexandrov accused Konovalov of conducting regular sessions of mass healing from all diseases "with clear signs of occultism." The ROC took the side of the academicians, whose discontent was caused by the sermons of Konovalov – he introduced people to a certain "Energy of Creation". The Federal Security Service got involved in the investigation, but they did not find any violations of the law in Konovalov's actions. In the leadership of the RAMS, the commission's requests were ignored, the director of the Institute of Bioregulation and Gerontology of the RAMS refused to fire Konovalov, and he continued his paid practice.

== The composition of the commission ==
The initial composition of the commission included 12 people, the list of which was approved by the decree of the Presidium of the RAS No. 68 of March 23, 1999 "On the Commission of the Russian Academy of Sciences on pseudoscience and falsification of scientific research." The second composition, expanded to 41 people, was approved by the corresponding decree of the Presidium of the RAS No. 195 of September 13, 2005. The third composition was approved in February 2013 by the decree of the Presidium of the RAS No. 42 dated February 26, 2013. As before, the core of the commission was made up of academicians and corresponding members of the RAS; it also included the scientific editor of the journal Vokrug Sveta Alexander Sergeev, popularizer of science Vladimir Surdin, as well as the mentalist Yuri Gorny – a total of 46 people.

In June 2016, by the decree of the Presidium of the RAS No. 160 dated June 28, 2016, the fourth composition of the commission was approved. Due to the unification of the RAS, RAMS and Russian Academy of Agricultural Sciences and the wide spread of medical quackery in the previous 5–10 years, a large number of biomedical specialists (14 out of 19 new members of the commission) were included in the new commission, including the founder of the Evolution Foundation, Peter Talantov. At the same time, Andrey Rostovtsev, co-founder of the free network community Dissernet, became a member of the commission. Thus, the commission expanded to 59 members, 6 of which formed a new coordinating body – the Bureau.

In December 2018, the commission was divided into two separate advisory bodies by the Presidium of the RAS– the Commission on Pseudoscience and the Commission on Falsification of Scientific Research, which included a total of 74 people. The new commissions included more philologists, doctors, psychologists, sociologists and representatives of other disciplines.

=== Composition of the Commission on Pseudoscience (since 2018) ===
Eugene Alexandrov – Chairman of the commission, Academician of the RAS

Askold Ivantchik – Deputy Chairman, Corresponding Member of the RAS

Mikhail Arkhipov – Candidate of Physical and Mathematical Sciences, Saint Petersburg State University
