= Andrey Rostovtsev =

Russian scientist, civil and political activist

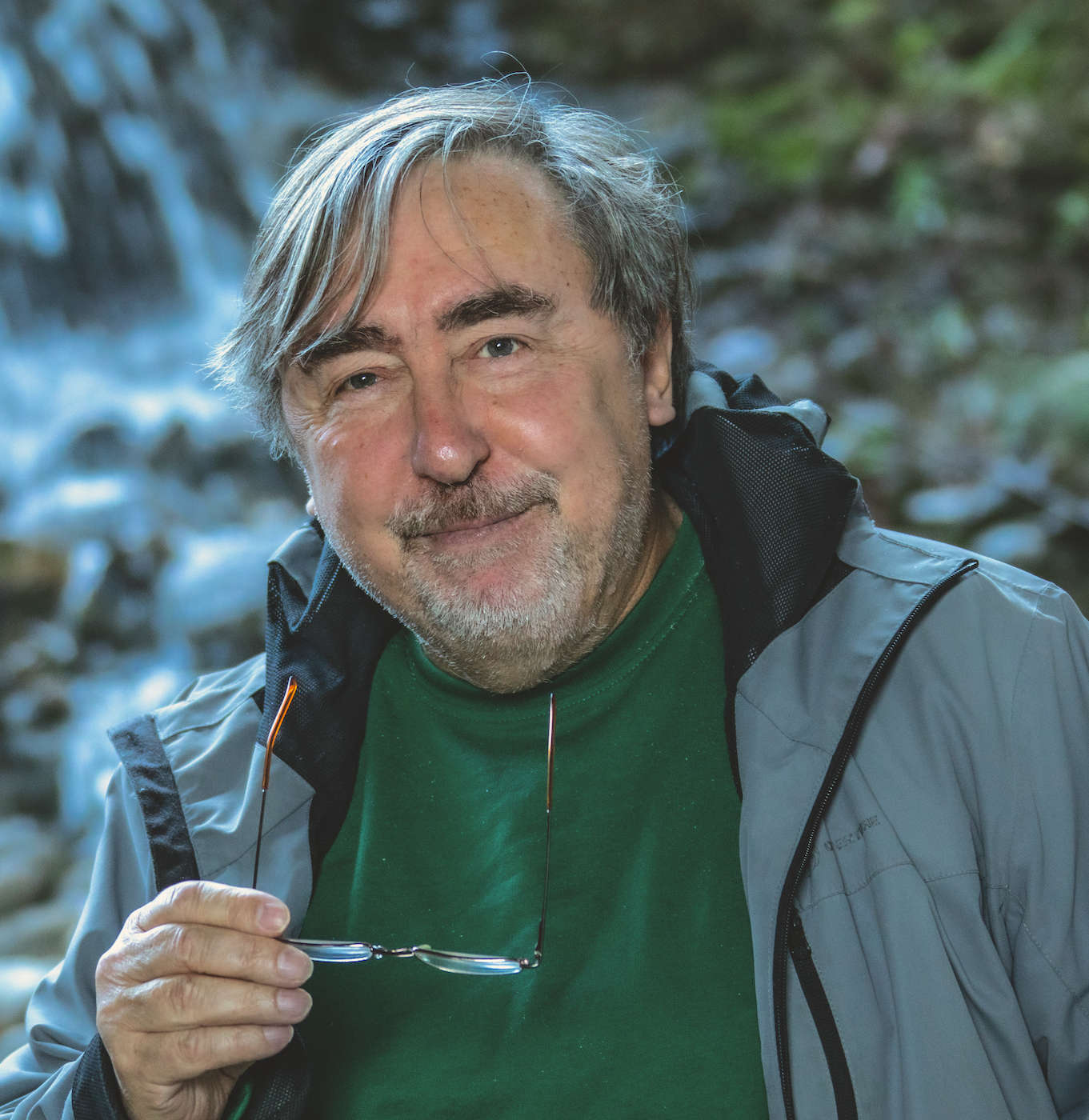
- Born: 21 March 1960 (age 66); Moscow, Russian SFSR, Soviet Union
- Citizenship: Soviet Union, Russian Federation
- Education: MEFI
- Known for: co-founder of Dissernet
- Scientific career
- Fields: Particle physics, neutrino astronomy
- Workplaces: Institute for Theoretical and Experimental Physics, Institute for Information Transmission Problems of the Russian Academy of Sciences (Kharkevich Institute)

Andrey Afrikanovich Rostovtsev (Russian: Андре́й Африка́нович Росто́вцев; born 21 March 1960) is a Soviet and Russian physicist and political activist. One of the founders of the volunteer community network Dissernet.

== Biography ==
In 1983 graduated from the MEFI. After graduation worked with ITEPh: until 2013 - as Head of the Laboratory of Physics of Elementary Particles.

The area of professional interests is Particle physics and Neutrino astronomy. Andrey Rostovtsev is the author of several hundred papers on particle physics, one of the most cited Russian authors of papers on experimental physics at particle accelerators. Member of the Corps of Physics Experts.

In 1997 he defended his doctoral thesis "Experimental study of hadron interactions of a photon using the H1 detector at the HERA accelerator".

In 2011, after ITEP was transferred under the control of the Kurchatov Institute, published a number of critical statements in defense of the institute, against the dominance of incompetent representatives of the new administration and the bureaucratization of science in general. Together with Vladimir Uralov, he founded the Internet project "Save ITEP". For criticism of the administration of the institute, he was fired from ITEP at the end of 2013.

After his dismissal from ITEP, he started working at the RAS Institute for Information Transmission Problems, Laboratory "Quantum physics and information".

== Participation in international projects ==
- ARGUS experiment at the DORIS electron-positron collider.
- Fundamental Research in High Energy Physics H1.
- ANTARES Neutrino observatory.

== Dissernet ==
In February 2013, Rostovtsev, together with journalist Sergey Parkhomenko, biologist Mikhail Gelfand, and physicist Andrey Zayakin, founded the volunteer community network Dissernet, which exposes fake dissertations. Rostovtsev developed key software for dissertation and publication verification system.

In 2018 Andrey Rostovtsev entered the commission of the Russian Academy of Sciences, known as the Commission for Counteracting the Falsification of Scientific Research. He was the initiator and leader of the work for discovering translation plagiarism in the papers of Russian authors in foreign predatory journals that formed the basis of the corresponding Report of the Commission in 2020.
