= Spin field =

Spin field may refer to:

- Spinor field, assignment of a spinor to every point in space, used in quantum mechanics and quantum field theory.
- Spin (physics) the spin property of elementary particles.
- A kind of Torsion field, used in pseudophysics.
