= House of Krasnushkin =

- Дом Краснушкина
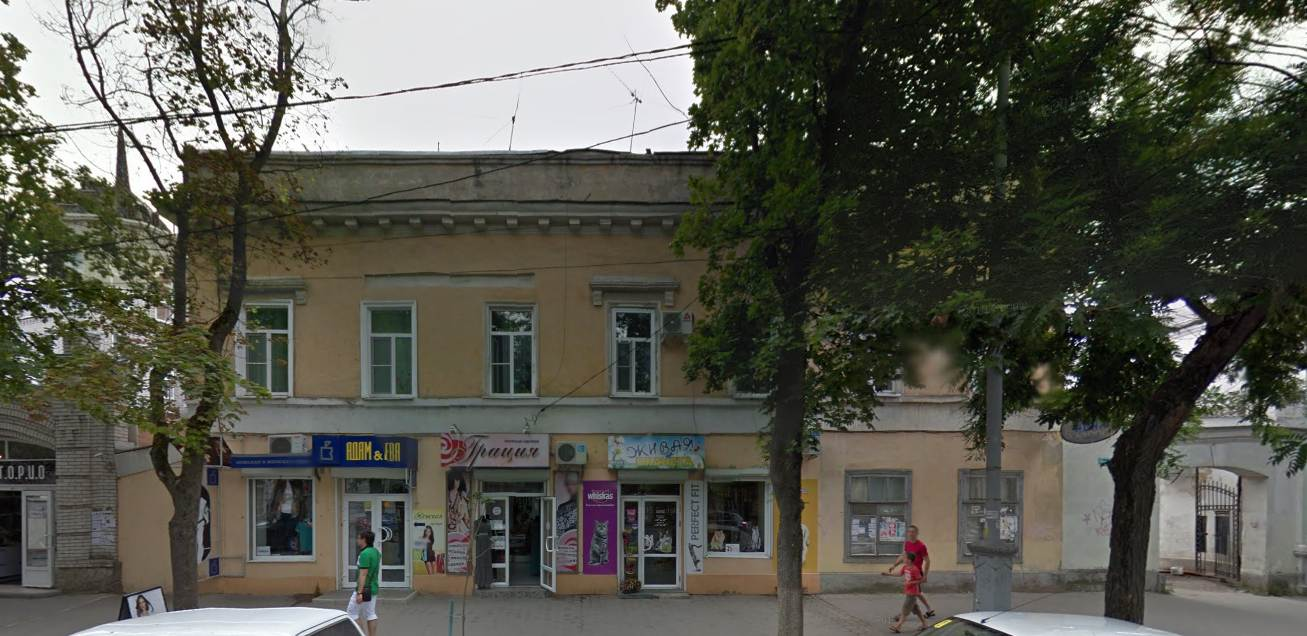
- Interactive map of the House of Krasnushkin area

General information
- Location: Taganrog
- Coordinates: 47°12′38″N 38°56′11″E
- Completed: 1871

The House of Krasnushkin (Russian: Дом Краснушкина) is a historical mansion in Taganrog (Petrovskaya St. 37, in old numbering No. 9). It is thought to have been built in 1871.

== History and description ==
The house was built presumably in 1871. The part of 141 quarters from Kommerchesky Lane corner in 1879 belonged to Zachariah Egorovich Krasnushkin (1816–1892), the honorary hereditary citizen of Taganrog. Zakhary Krasnushkin coming from a noble Cossack sort served from the colonel's rank to the general, the army foreman Oblasti Voysk of Donskoy. Having got this manor in the center of Taganrog, Zakhary Krasnushkin built two two-storeyed houses on this site: Petrovsky 7 at the corner and, in the neighborhood, Petrovsky 9 (in old numbering). The forged gate which conducted to the general farmstead divided two houses.

Since 1871 Krasnushkin kept in this house shop from St. Petersburg Manufactory Company. Traded in men's and ladies' shirts, jackets from a shooting, scarfs nasal, simple and batiste, other quick-selling goods. In the same years the shop of the German silver products Gennigera placed on a leasehold basis where German silver vases for pancakes were in special demand was famous; trade A. M. Valera Bielefeld, selling fabrics from pure linen, and manufactory shop of M. S. Beshtavov.

In 1911 in a farmstead of this house, the steam dye-house and a workshop on cleaning of clothes belonging to Danziger were located.

In 1926 a half of the building was occupied by N.K. Boyarov's trade "Buttons and so forth". In 1928 there was a commission shop, here in 1931 – department store. In 1933 in Krasnushkin's House the trading floor of the Torgsin all-union association was open.

On 31 May 2015, on the house within the all-Russian project "Last Address" the sign in memory of the repressed M. M. Bondarenko was established.

Krasnushkin's house represents the two-storeyed brick plastered house executed in style of provincial classicism with a minimum of architectural elements. The first floor initially intended for placement of shops. Had three doors and four windows. The second floor was inhabited, an entrance upward from the yard. On a facade seven rectangular windows.
