= "Scientists" from the High Road =

Book series by Eduard Kruglyakov

- Author: Eduard Kruglyakov
- Country: Russia
- Language: Russian
- Publisher: Nauka publishing house
- Published: 1998; 2005; 2009
- No. of books: 3

«"Scientists" from the High Road» (Russian: «Учёные» с большой дороги) is a series of popular science books authored by Russian academic Eduard Kruglyakov. The first book in the series was published in a small print run (1,200 copies) in 1998 by the Nauka publishing house. The title of the opening volume poses the question: "What Is Happening to Us?".

The aim of the narrative was to criticize the pseudoscience that had emerged shortly before the collapse of the USSR (perpetrated by Pavel Globa, Chumak, Kashpirovsky, sorcerers, astrologers, and proponents of so-called "torsion fields", "informationology", and "psychoenergetics"), whose representatives sought funding from the state and the public for their undertakings. The author chose to label such charlatans "'scientists' from the high road".

According to a 70th birthday congratulations, Eduard Kruglyakov was "editor in chief of a science-popularizing book series".
