= Alexander Panchin =

- Александр Панчин
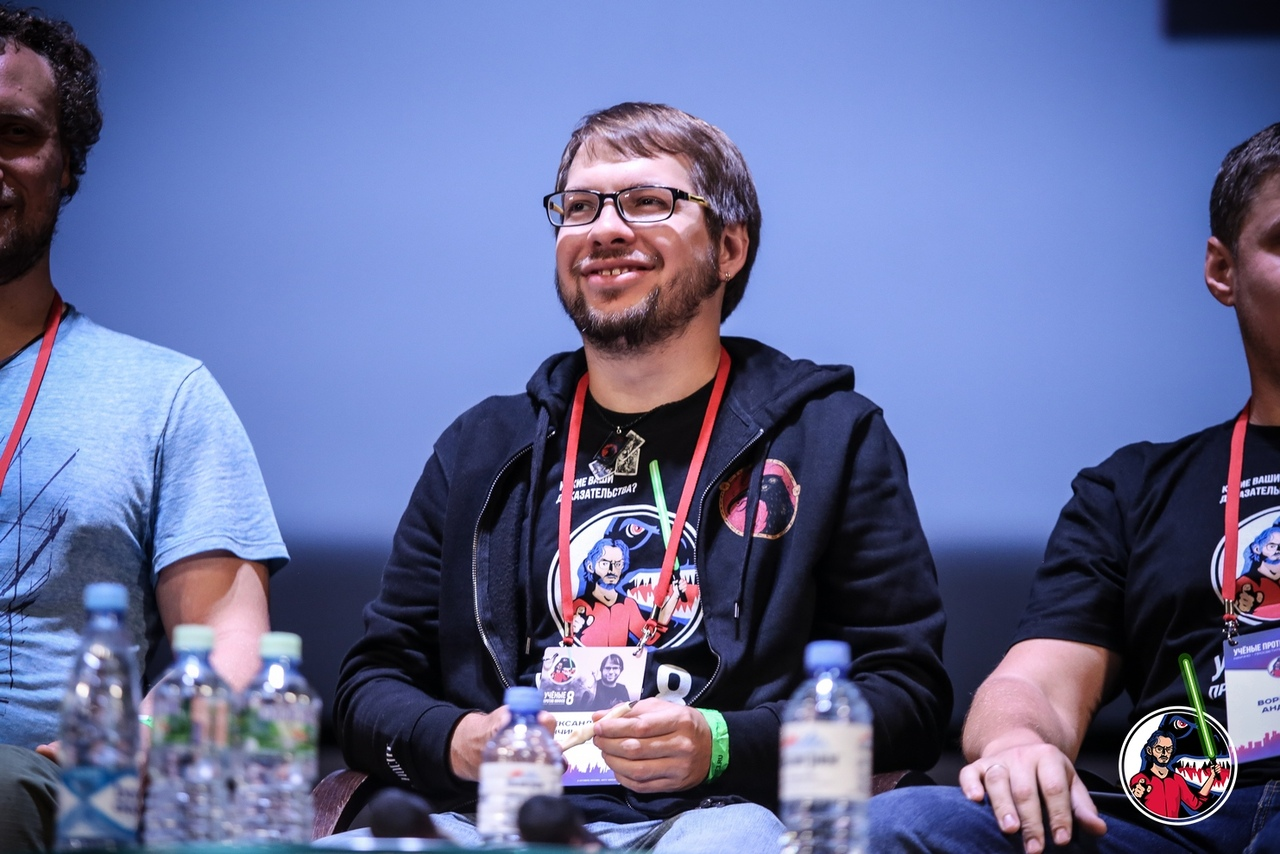
- Panchin in 2018
- Born: May 19, 1986 (age 40); Moscow, Soviet Union
- Education: Candidate of Biology Sciences (2011)
- Alma mater: Moscow State University
- Scientific career
- Fields: Biological engineering
- Website: https://alexanderpanchin.com

Alexander Yurievich Panchin (Russian: Александр Юрьевич Панчин; born 19 May 1986) is a Russian biologist and science popularizer. He is a Candidate of Sciences and a Senior Research of The Institute for Information Transmission Problems (IITP RAS).

In 2003, Panchin enrolled in the Faculty of Bioengineering and Bioinformatics at Moscow State University, graduating in 2008. In 2011, he earned his Candidate of Sciences degree in "mathematical biology".

Panchin is a member of the organizing committee and expert council of the Harry Houdini Prize and a member of the "Evolution" educational foundation. He is engaged in popularization of science, specifically educating the public on the safety of genetically modified food products. He runs a YouTube blog, is the author of popular science articles and books, and is invited as an expert on television and radio programs.

== Science communication ==
Panchin criticizes claims about the dangers of genetically modified organisms. His work addresses topics of genetic engineering and other biotechnologies, aging, and molecular biology, and evolutionary theory. He actively combats pseudoscience and criticizes creationism.

Alexander claims the anti-GMO movement as unscientific. A paper co-authored by Panchin and Alexander Tuzhikov from the IITP RAS, which analyzed several notable papers on the harm of GMOs, was published in the journal "Critical Reviews in Biotechnology".

Panchin is an opponent of homeopathy. As part of the RAS Commission on Pseudoscience, Panchin demanded that RUDN University be stripped of its right to independently award academic degrees following the scandalous defense of a dissertation on homeopathic remedies.

=== Writing activity ===
Alexander Panchin is the author of popular science books. His first work, The Sum of Biotechnology, was released in 2015. The book is largely devoted to debunking myths associated with GMOs. The author demonstrates that direct intervention into the genetic code of cultivated plants is fundamentally no different from traditional breeding, and the "GMO-free" label is purely a marketing tool. The release of The Sum of Biotechnology almost coincided with the discussion and adoption by the State Duma of a bill prohibiting the cultivation of modified products, which, as a reviewer for the Snob magazine noted, became the best advertisement for the book.

The second work, Defense Against the Dark Arts, is devoted to various myths and misconceptions related to people's belief in the supernatural and why the human brain is prone to irrational fears. Panchin's third and fourth books, Apophenia, named after the brain tendency of the same name, and Harvard Necromancer, are fiction. Apophenia tells of a dystopian world where pseudoscientific ideas have triumphed, while Harvard Necromancer tells the story of a Harvard scientist who discovered magic.

Panchin's first book in English, Immortality or Death: From Entropy to Eternity, summarizes research related to aging and tells about attempts to slow it down.

== Views ==
Alexander Panchin is an atheist. He views religious beliefs as "viral memes" that have adapted to effectively persuade people that they must be spread further. According to Panchin, there are cognitive biases that create the preconditions for such beliefs.

Panchin has called himself "a full-fledged humanist". For him, nothing is more valuable than human life: "Any human death is a great tragedy. We must minimize mortality, fight to extend life, and combat diseases". On February 24, 2022, he signed an open letter from Russian scientists and science journalists condemning Russia's invasion of Ukraine and calling for the withdrawal of Russian troops from Ukrainian territory.

== Awards ==
He is a laureate of the "Enlightener Prize" for his book "The Sum of Biotechnology". In 2017, he was included in the list of "The 75 Most Respected People in the Country" by the magazine Russian Reporter. He was a finalist for the "For Loyalty to Science - 2017" Award. He is a laureate of the Alexander Belyaev Literary Prize for the dystopian novel "Apophenia".

== Books ==
- The Sum of Biotechnology: A Guide to Debunking Myths About the Genetic Modification of Plants, Animals, and Humans (AST, 2016) ISBN 978-5-17-093602-1
- Defense Against the Dark Arts: A Guide to the World of Paranormal Phenomena (AST, 2018) ISBN 978-5-17-982690-3
- Apophenia (Piter, 2019) ISBN 978-5-4461-1086-5
- Harvard Necromancer (Piter, 2021) ISBN 978-5-4461-1487-0
- Immortality or Death: From Entropy to Eternity (Open Longevity, 2025) ISBN 979-8998972904
