= Larisa Melikhova =

Russian scientist, civil activist

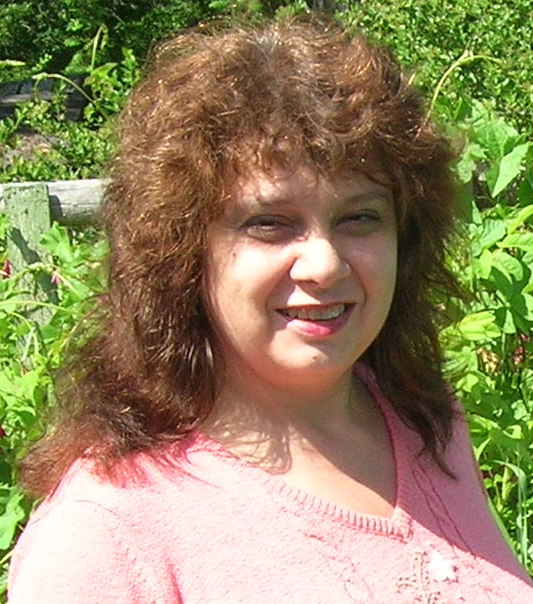
- Born: 3 February 1959 (age 67); Leningrad, Soviet Union
- Citizenship: Russian Federation, Israel
- Education: Saint Petersburg State University
- Known for: Dissernet Project Manager
- Scientific career
- Workplaces: Last Address, Dissernet

Larisa Georgievna Melikhova (Russian: Лариса Георгиевна Мелихова; born 03 February 1959) is a Russian researcher and political activist. She is one of the coordinators of the volunteer community network Dissernet.

== Biography ==
In 1981 she graduated from the Leningrad State University (now Saint Petersburg State University). She then worked as a research fellow at the Voeikov Main Geophysical Observatory, then at the Russian State Hydrometeorological University; defended a doctoral thesis “Modeling air pollution under breeze circulation conditions”.

In the 90s, she was the coordinator of the School Information Network at the St. Petersburg branch of the Institute of New Educational Technologies, and was involved in the introduction of the Internet into school education.

Since 2000, she has worked as a technical writer / analyst in various branches of foreign IT companies in Moscow and St. Petersburg: Motorola, Alcatel-Lucent, T-Systems, and others.

Since 2014, began collaborating with the volunteer community network Dissernet where managed several projects, including the Disseropedia of Universities and Disseropedia of Journals. Published a lot of articles on ethical violations in science in the newspaper “Troitsky Variant – Science”; since 2024 has been publishing articles in the newspaper for scientists “T-Invariant”.

Participating in the Last Address project as a site editor.

Since 2023 lives in Israel.
