= Torsion =

Torsion may refer to:

== Science ==
- Torsion (mechanics), the twisting of an object due to an applied torque
- Torsion of spacetime, the field used in Einstein–Cartan theory and
  - Alternatives to general relativity
- Torsion angle, in chemistry

=== Biology and medicine ===
- Torsion fracture or spiral fracture, a bone fracture when torque is applied
- Organ torsion, twisting that interrupts the blood supply to that organ:
  - Splenic torsion, causing splenic infarction
  - Ovarian torsion
  - Testicular torsion
- Penile torsion, a congenital condition
- Torsion of the digestive tract in some domestic animals:
  - Torsion, a type of horse colic
  - Gastric torsion, or gastric dilatation volvulus
- Torsion (gastropod), a developmental feature of all gastropods

== Mathematics ==
- Torsion of a curve
- Torsion tensor, in differential geometry
- Torsion (algebra), in ring theory
- Torsion group, in group theory and arithmetic geometry
- Tor functor, the derived functors of the tensor product of modules over a ring
- Torsion-free module, in algebra
  - See also Torsion-free (disambiguation)
- Analytic torsion (Reidemeister torsion, R-torsion, Franz torsion, de Rham torsion, Ray-Singer torsion), a topological invariant of manifolds
- Whitehead torsion, in geometric topology

== Other uses ==
- Torsion field (pseudoscience), a field alleged to make faster-than-light communication and paranormal phenomena possible
