= Sergey Parkhomenko =

Russian publisher, journalist and political commentator (1964-)

- Сергей Пархоменко
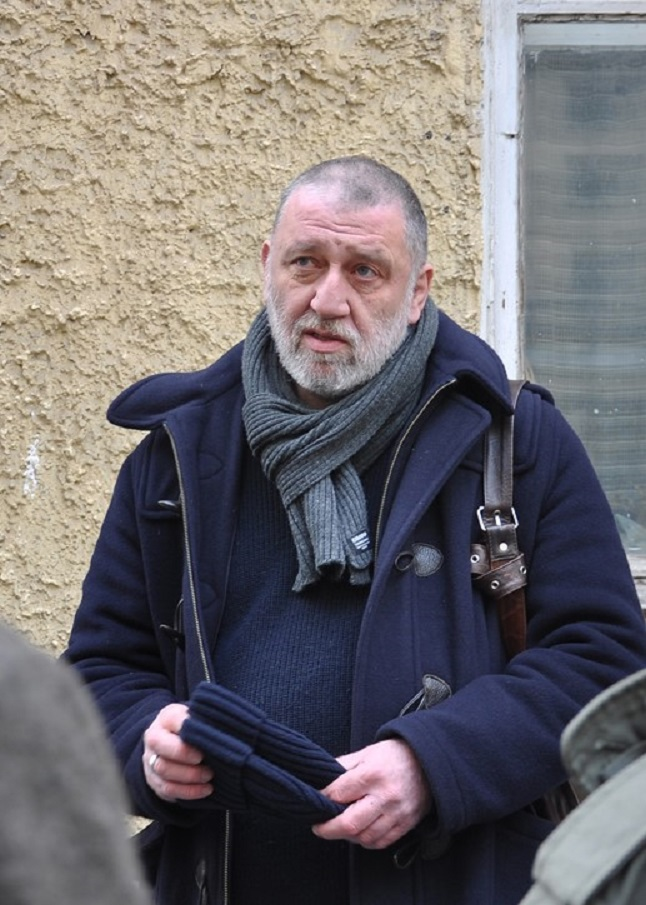
- Parkhomenko in 2021
- Born: March 13, 1964 (age 62); Moscow, Russian SFSR, Soviet Union
- Citizenship: Russian
- Education: Moscow State Univeristy
- Occupations: Publisher, journalist and political commentator
- Spouse: Varvara Gornostaeva
- Children: 3 sons

Sergey Borisovich Parkhomenko (Russian: Серге́й Бори́сович Пархо́менко; born March 13, 1964) is a Russian publisher, journalist, opposition activist and political commentator.

He currently works for the Woodrow Wilson International Center for Scholars.

== Biography ==
Parkhomenko was born in Moscow in 1964 and graduated from the Department of Journalism of the Moscow State University. In the early 1990s, he worked as a political reporter and columnist in Russian dailies such as Nezavisimaya Gazeta (Independent Newspaper) and Segodnia (Today).

In 1996, Parkhomenko founded Russia's first news magazine Itogi (Summing Up), which was published in close cooperation with American weekly Newsweek. Parkhomenko was the chief editor of the magazine until 2001, when the new owner fired the magazine's entire team. Immediately after the entire editorial staff had been fired, Newsweek terminated its relationship with the new owners of Itogi, in protest that the state monopoly Gazprom had seized control of the magazine and there was a hostile takeover of the board of directors by a state-owned company. Parkhomenko then launched a new news magazine, Yezhenedelnyi Zhournal (Weekly Magazine), and was its editor-in-chief until 2003.

From 2004 to 2009, Parkhomenko successively headed several publishing houses (Inostranka, CoLibri, Atticus and Corpus). From October 2009 till the end of 2011, he headed the Vokrug sveta publishing house, where he was the chief editor of Russia's oldest travel magazine by the same name.

Since 2003, Parkhomenko has hosted the political talk show Sut' Sobytiy (Crux of the Matter), which aired on the radio station Echo of Moscow. In 2022, after the station was closed (the few days after the invasion of Russian troops into Ukraine), Parkhomenko continued to work on his own YouTube channel and in programs of his colleagues on other independent YouTube channels.

Since autumn 2016 he has been Public Policy Fellow and later Senior Advisor at The Kennan Institute of Woodrow Wilson International Center for Scholars, Washington DC.

He is married to Varvara Gornostaeva. Serguey has two sons Lev and Peter from the first marriage, Matvey from the second marriage, and two stepsons Ilya and Yakov.

== Public activities ==
Parkhomenko is known as an author or participant of various civic initiatives. In 1994 he was one of the founders of the Moscow Journalists' Charter. In 2004 he became a member of Committee 2008 which tried to find a "democratic alternative" facing the upcoming presidential elections of 2008. Parkhomenko is also the author of the idea and the name of the public movement "Society of Blue Buckets" that fights against the privileged position of road vehicles with flashing lights (except for firefighters, police and ambulance); Parkhomenko was an organizer of the society's first public events in spring 2010.

During Russian protests in 2011–2013, Parkhomenko was one of the leading figures of the movement. In the fall of 2012 he was elected a member of the Russian Opposition Coordination Council. Parkhomenko was instrumental in organizing mass rallies in Moscow in Winter 2011 – Spring 2012. In the spring of 2012, he co-founded the League of Voters and initiated mass lawsuits against government election fraud. This activity resulted in March 2013 in Constitutional Court of Russia hearing where the Court ruled that Russian voters should be allowed to appeal election results directly.

Since 2013, Parkhomenko is one of the founders (along with Andrey Rostovtsev, Andrey Zayakin and Mikhail Gelfand) and an active popularizer of a voluntary networking community Dissernet whose activity aimed at purification of the Russian science from plagiarism, especially among Doctoral and post-Doctoral dissertations in Russia.

Parkhomenko is also one of the initiators of the project Last Address that started in 2014. This project (based on the similar European project Stolperstein) implies installing a small (about the size of a palm) memorial plaque on the wall of the last house of a person subjected to political persecution in the Soviet years.

In 2014 Parkhomenko was a member of the Congress "Ukraine – Russia: A Dialogue", held in Kyiv. In May 2014 S. Parkhomenko was elected a member of the Russian PEN Center, the Russian branch of the PEN International. In January 2017 he was expelled from the group for "provocative activity"; Parkhomenko claimed he was expelled for criticizing the Russian PEN Center for failing to support imprisoned (in Russia) Ukrainian filmmaker Oleg Sentsov.

In 2016, Parkhomenko became a co-founder and jury member of the independent award in the field of professional journalism Redkollegia (in Russian translates to "Editorial Board"), established by the charitable foundation "Sreda Foundation" to support free professional journalism in Russia. In the interview to The Fix given in April 2025, Parkhomenko explained how the award was functioning during wartime, in spite of new challenges.

== Awards ==
- 1993 – the medal "Defender of the freedom in Russia".
- 2007 – France's "Ordre des Arts et des Lettres", for publishing activity.
- 2011 – Russian Government award in the area of print media. The award was ordered by the Prime Minister Vladimir Putin to Parkhomenko and other publishers of the magazine Vokrug Sveta.
- 2013 – "Golden pen of Russia", a journalistic award for the year 2013, for popularizing "Dissernet" in press and in Internet.
- 2014 – the prize "Politprosvet" for the project "Dissernet". Prize was awarded to all co-founders of the project (including Andrey Rostovtsev, Mikhail Gelfand, Andrey Zayakin and Kirill Mikhailov) in two nominations: a special honorary nomination "For honor and dignity", and the nomination "People's vote".
- 2015 – the winner of The Moscow Times Awards for 2015 in the nomination "Personal Social Responsibility" for the project Last Address.
