= Nuclearite =

Hypothetical object in particle physics

Nuclearites are hypothetical objects consisting of nuggets of strange quark matter or a strangelet surrounded by an electron shell, forming an atom-like neutral system, but with masses much larger than a normal atom. These heavy compact particles were first proposed by Edward Witten, and the name coined by Alvaro De Rújula and Sheldon Glashow in 1984 to describe such particles colliding with the Earth's atmosphere, by analogy to more conventional meteorites. It is predicted that nuclearites would travel at hundreds of kilometers per second. Owing to their high energies and mass to size ratio, they should form streaks of light in the lower atmospheric regions. To date, no nuclearites have been successfully observed, but this failure itself places constraints on some theories of dark matter.

== Properties ==
The strangelet forms what is called a nuclearite core, composed primarily of a up, down, and strange quarks, in almost equal proportions. Nuclearites are estimated to have masses between 0.1 and 100 kg. Additionally, they are predicted to be more stable than particles composed of solely up and down quarks. Nuclearites are expected to have a constant matter density. The hypothesized source of these particles are relics from the early universe or the big bang, as well as extreme energetic astrophysical phenomena such as the merger of two quark stars.

== Experimental techniques for detection ==
Nuclearites should in principle be detectable based on their interaction with the Earth's atmosphere, with neutrino telescopes, and in collider experiments. In particular, neutrino telescopes such as ANTARES or Ice Cube are possible detectors for nuclearites.

== See also ==
- Strangelet
- Cosmic rays
