= Andrey Zayakin =

Russian physicist, political activist, and journalist

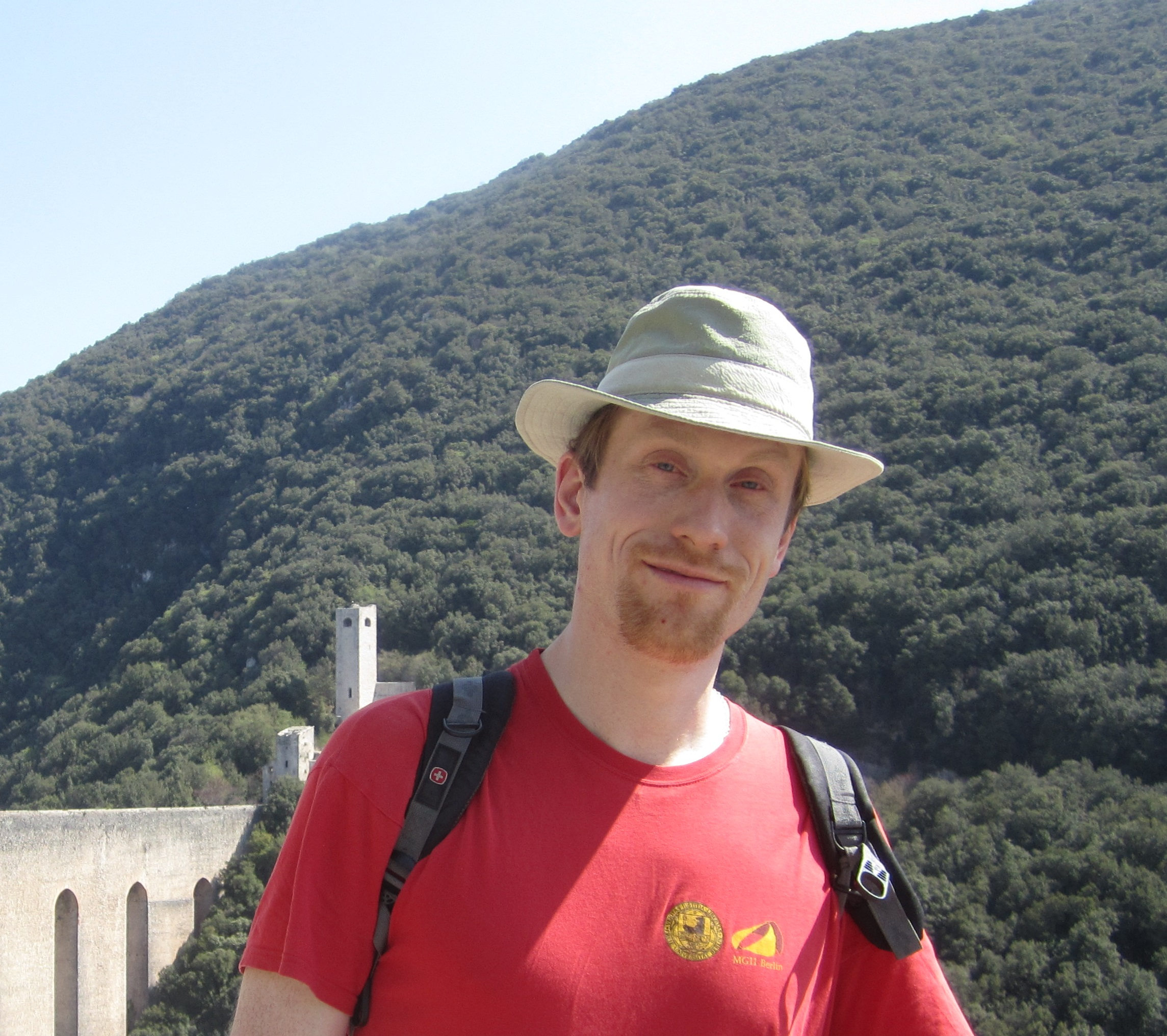
- Born: 23 February 1981 (age 45); Yakutsk, Russian SFSR, Soviet Union
- Education: Moscow State University Faculty of Physics
- Known for: co-founder of Dissernet, journalist of Novaya Gazeta
- Awards: Redkollegia prize, 2019
- Scientific career
- Fields: String theory, Quantum chromodynamics
- Doctoral advisor: Dmitry Shirkov

Andrey Viktorovich Zayakin (Russian: Андрей Викторович Заякин; born 23 February 1981) is a Russian physicist, political activist and journalist. He is one of the founders of the volunteer community network Dissernet.

== Biography ==
In 2004 Zayakin graduated from the Department of Physics of the Moscow State University. In 2005 and 2007 he was a trainee at the Free University of Berlin; from 2008 until 2010 he worked at LMU Munich. In 2009 at the Institute for Theoretical and Experimental Physics he defended a doctoral thesis “Nonperturbative Phenomena in Quantum Field Theory in External Fields and at a Finite Temperature”. In 2011—2011 he worked at the University of Perugia, from 2012 – at the University of Santiago de Compostelam and (from 2005) – at the Institute for Theoretical and Experimental Physics.

In 2015 Zayakin became a journalist in Novaya Gazeta magazine, since 2018 — chief editor of the Data department there. Zayakin's articles were repeatedly nominated for the Redkollegia award, in 2019 he became the winner of this award.

== Civil activities ==
=== Anti-corruption revelations ===
Since mid-2011, Zayakin began to cooperate with Alexei Navalny, participating in the anti-corruption project RosPil. In 2013, together with Alexei Navalny and Dmitry Gudkov began searching for undeclared property of high-ranking officials: Andrey Zayakin was then known in the blogosphere under the nickname "Doctor Z" (doct_z). Among the revelations of A. Zayakin are undeclared apartments in Miami of Vladimir Pekhtin and Mikhail Margelov.

=== Dissernet: revelation of plagiarism in dissertations ===
From the beginning of 2013, Zayakin independently searched for plagiarism in dissertations of State Duma deputies defended in Russia. One of the first victims of investigations became a State Duma deputy Rishat Abubakirov.

These works served as one of the grounds for the emergence in February 2013 of the volunteer community network "Dissernet", whose main task was to expose fake dissertations. In addition to Zayakin, the founders of Dissernet are the journalist Sergey Parkhomenko, the physicist Andrey Rostovtsev and the biologist Mikhail Gelfand. In Dissernet Zayakin leads a group of volunteers who write applications and apply for deprivation of academic degrees people with forged dissertations.

In 2018 Zayakin became secretary of the commission of the Russian Academy of Sciences, known as the Commission for Counteracting the Falsification of Scientific Research. In 2020 the Commission initiated the first large retraction of scientific papers from Russian journals after Dissernet investigation.

== Political activity ==
In the elections to the State Duma in 2016, Andrey Zayakin headed the regional list of the Yabloko party in the Far East.

In February 2022, he signed an open letter from Russian scientists condemning the Russian invasion of Ukraine and calling for the withdrawal of Russian troops from Ukrainian territory.

== Detention and prosecution ==
On August 29, 2022, Zayakin was detained by police and charged with financial extremist activity for transferring 1000 rubles (about US$20) to the Anti-Corruption Foundation of Alexei Navalny. Zayakin was given a preventive measure in the form of a ban on certain actions.
