= Torsion field =

Torsion field can refer to:

- A torsion tensor in differential geometry.
- The field used in Einstein–Cartan theory and other alternatives to general relativity that involve torsion of spacetime
- Torsion field (pseudoscience), a field alleged to make faster-than-light communication and paranormal phenomena possible
