= Torsion-free =

In mathematics, torsion-free may refer to:

== Abstract algebra ==
- Torsion-free group, a group whose only element of finite order is the identity
- Torsion-free module, module over an integral domain where zero is the only torsion element
- Torsion-free abelian group, an abelian group which is a torsion-free group
- Torsion-free rank, the cardinality of a maximal linearly independent subset of an abelian group or of a module over an integral domain

== Differential geometry ==
- Torsion-free affine connection, an affine connection whose torsion tensor vanishes
- Torsion-free metric connection or Levi-Civita connection, a unique symmetric connection on the tangent bundle of a manifold compatible with the metric

== See also ==
- Torsion (disambiguation)
