= ANTARES (telescope) =

Former neutrino detector

Coordinates: 42°48′N 6°10′E

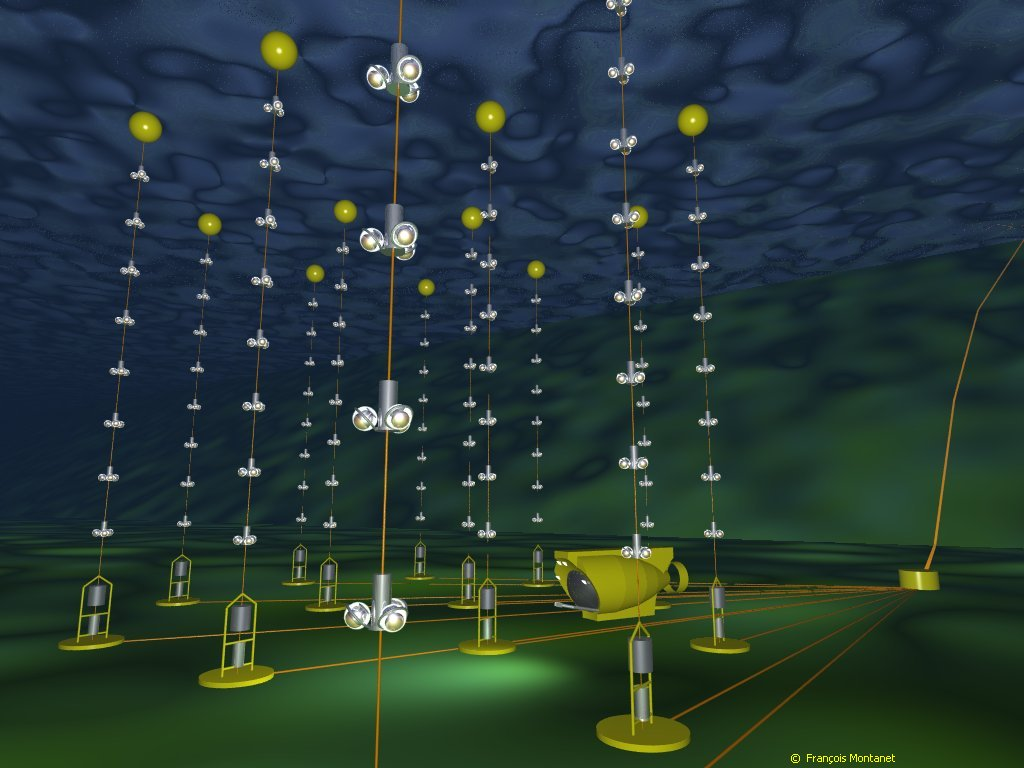
An artist illustration of the Antares neutrino detector and the Nautile.

ANTARES (Astronomy with a Neutrino Telescope and Abyss environmental RESearch project) was a neutrino detector that resided 2.5 km under the Mediterranean Sea off the coast of Toulon, France. It was designed to be used as a directional neutrino telescope to locate and observe neutrino flux from cosmic origins in the direction of the Southern Hemisphere of the Earth, a complement to the South Pole neutrino detector IceCube that detects neutrinos from both hemispheres. The experiment was a recognized CERN experiment (RE6). Other neutrino telescopes designed for use in the nearby area at the time included the Greek NESTOR telescope and the Italian NEMO telescope, which both were joined in the KM3Net project; the KM3Net project can be viewed as the continuation of ANTARES (although KM3Net is a larger project and comprises more aspects than just continuation of ANTARES). The data taking of ANTARES was finished in February 2022, after 16 years of continuous operation. The telescope was dismantled afterwards.

== Design ==
The array contained a set of twelve separate vertical strings of photomultiplier tubes. Each one had 75 optical modules and was about 350 meters long. They were anchored at the bottom of the sea at a depth of about 2.5 km, roughly 70 meters apart from each other. When neutrinos enter the Southern Hemisphere of the Earth, they usually continue traveling directly through it. On rare occasions, a few muon neutrinos interact with the water in the Mediterranean Sea. When this happens, they produce a high energy muon. ANTARES worked by its photomultiplier tubes detecting the Cherenkov radiation emitted as the muon passes through the water. The detection techniques used discriminated between the signature of "upward-going muons", a muon neutrino that has had interactions with matter below the detector (the Earth), and much higher flux of "downward atmospheric muons".

In contrast to the South Pole neutrino telescopes AMANDA and IceCube, ANTARES used water instead of ice as its Cherenkov medium. As light in water is less scattered than in ice this results in a better resolving power. On the other hand, water contains more sources of background light than ice (radioactive isotopes potassium-40 in the sea salt and bioluminescent organisms), leading to a higher energy threshold for ANTARES with respect to IceCube and making more sophisticated background-suppression methods necessary.

== History ==
The construction of ANTARES was completed on May 30, 2008, two years after the first string was deployed.

Initial testing began in 2000. Equipment indirectly related to the detector such as a seismometer were deployed in 2005. The first string of photomultiplier tubes was moved into place in February 2006. In September 2006 the second line was successfully connected. Lines 3, 4 and 5 were deployed at the end of 2006 and connected in January 2007. This was an important step that made Antares the biggest neutrino telescope in the Northern hemisphere (surpassing the Baikal neutrino telescope). Lines 6, 7, 8, 9, and 10 were deployed between March and early November 2007 and connected in December 2007 and January 2008. From May 2008 the detector was running in its complete 12-line configuration.

Deployment and connection of the detector were performed in cooperation with the French oceanographic institute IFREMER, using the ROV Victor, and for some earlier operations the submarine Nautile.

The detector finished collecting data in 2022 and was dismantled in a series of sea campaigns in 2022.

== Experimental goals ==
The ANTARES project complemented the IceCube Neutrino Observatory in Antarctica. The detection principles of the two projects were very similar, although ANTARES only pointed toward the Southern Hemisphere. Thanks to its location in the Mediterranean Sea, ANTARES was more sensitive to neutrinos with energies below 100 TeV in the southern sky, a region that includes many galactic sources. ANTARES detected neutrinos from high energy origin, particularly in the range from 10^{10} to 10^{14} electronvolts (10 GeV - 100 TeV). Over many years of operation, it attempted to produce a map of the neutrino flux from cosmic origins in the Southern Hemisphere. Of particular interest was the possible detection of astrophysical point sources of neutrinos, possibly in correlation with observations in other bands (such as gamma ray sources observed by the HESS telescope in Namibia, which had a common field of view with ANTARES).

Apart from this astro-particle physics aspect, the ANTARES telescope also attempted to tackle some fundamental problems in particle physics, such as the search for dark matter in the form of neutralino annihilation in the Sun (normal solar neutrinos being outside the energy range of ANTARES) or the Galactic Center. Due to the very different methods employed, ANTARES' expected sensitivity was complementary to both the direct dark matter searches performed by experiments such as DAMA and CDMS, and to the indirect searches at the LHC. Detection of neutralino signals would have also confirmed supersymmetry, but was not generally considered very likely at the ANTARES sensitivity level. Other possible "exotic" phenomena that could conceivably have been measured by ANTARES included nuclearites or magnetic monopoles.

== Results ==
The first neutrino detections were reported in Feb 2007.

Using 6 years of data, a search of the galactic center for point sources of neutrinos found none. Atmospheric neutrino oscillations were also measured.

== Additional instrumentation ==
In addition to the main optical detector for cosmic neutrinos, the ANTARES experiment also housed a number of instruments for the study of the deep sea environment, such as salinity and oxygen probes, sea current profilers and instrumentation for the measurement of light transmission and sound velocity. Also, a camera system was installed for automatic tracking of bioluminescent organisms. Results from these instruments, while also important for the calibration of the detector, were shared with ocean science institutes involved in the ANTARES collaboration. While the ANTARES detector contained an acoustic positioning system for the alignment of the free-floating detector lines, it also housed a separate dedicated acoustic detection system AMADEUS, which comprised 6 converted ANTARES storeys with hydrophones to evaluate the possibility for acoustic detection of neutrinos in the deep sea. The first 3 of these acoustic storeys were included in the instrumentation line, the other 3 on the 12th line.

== See also ==
- P-ONE
