= Eugene Alexandrov =

Russian physicist

Eugene Borisovich Alexandrov
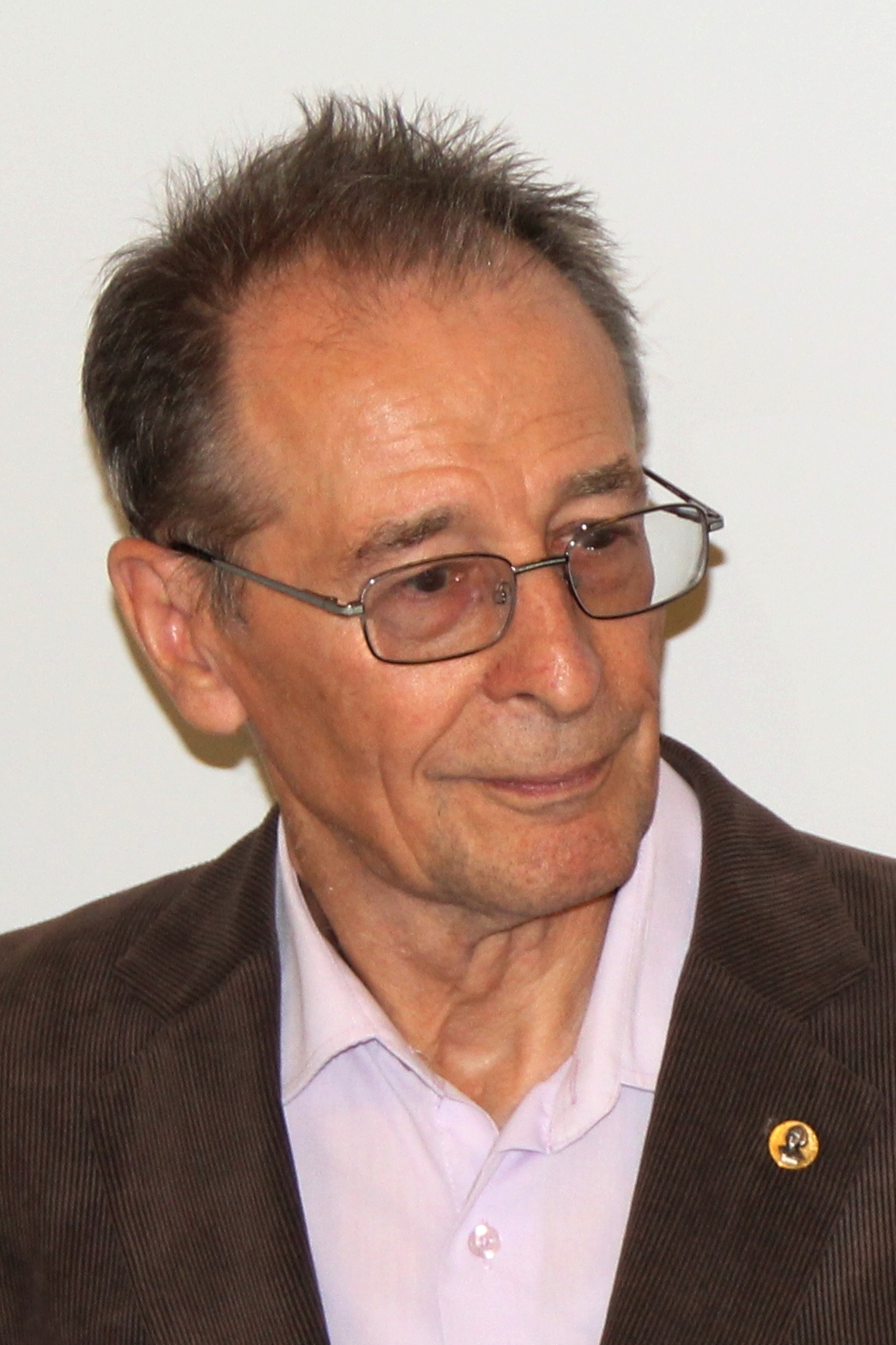
- Born: April 13, 1936; Leningrad
- Education: Peter the Great St. Petersburg Polytechnic University
- Awards: 1978 USSR State Prize; 1974 Rozhdestvensky Russian Academy of Sciences Prize; 2016 Pyotr Lebedev Gold Medal
- Scientific career
- Fields: physics
- Workplaces: Vavilov State Optical Institute

Eugene Borisovich Alexandrov (Russian: Евгений Борисович Александров, born April 13, 1936, in Leningrad, Soviet Union) is a Russian physicist, member of the Russian Academy of Sciences (since 1992), Doctor of Sciences, head of the Commission on Pseudoscience.

Laureate of the 1978 USSR State Prize and of the 2016 Pyotr Lebedev Gold Medal and of the 1974 Rozhdestvensky Russian Academy of Sciences Prize.

He is a nephew of the President of the Academy of Sciences of the USSR Anatoly Alexandrov.

He graduated from the Peter the Great St. Petersburg Polytechnic University in 1960.

In 1991 he received the title of Professor.
