= Dissernet =

Russian scientific anti-plagiarism community

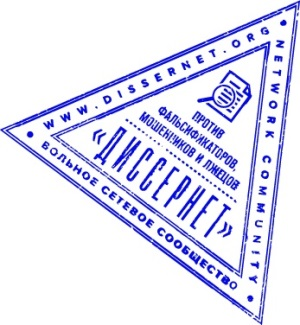
- Website type: Social movement
- Available in: Russian
- Creators: Andrey Rostovtsev, Andrey Zayakin, Sergey Parkhomenko, Mikhail Gelfand
- Website: dissernet.org
- Commercial: No
- Launched: 23 September 2013
- Current status: Working

Dissernet (Russian: Диссернет) is a volunteer community network whose goal is to expose plagiarism in Russia. The core activity of the community is conducting examinations of doctoral and habilitation (higher doctorate) theses defended in Russian scientific and educational institutions since the end of the 1990s, and making the results of such examinations known to as many people as possible. The community is composed of professional scientists working in various fields of science both in Russia and abroad, and also journalists, civil activists and volunteers.

The community was established in January 2013. The full Dissernet site, dissernet.org, as well as its reduced version, dissernet.ru, were opened on 23 September 2013.

By 2016, the project identified around 5,600 suspected plagiarists—focusing on officials in government and academia, and other members of the country's elite—and released reports on around 1,300 of them. Russian media regularly report on Dissernet's findings, and the site has been credited with raising attention for the issue of academic fraud in the country. In a 2016 exposé, Dissernet showed that one in nine members of the State Duma had obtained academic degrees with theses that were substantially plagiarized and likely ghostwritten.

By 2025, the total number of people with different types of academic misconduct exceeded 40,000; among them there are about 14,000 people who plagiarized their dissertations, and approximately the same numbers of people with academic misconduct in their publications and those who participated in defenses of plagiarized dissertations as scientific advisers or reviewers (for detail, use filters on the Dissernet site). 1,700 people have had their academic degree officially revoked.

== Activities ==
The objective of Dissernet's examinations is to detect gross and deliberate violations of the legally established rules for certification of scientific workers, as well as violations of the regulations for awarding academic degrees. Dissernet deems theses containing such violations to be fraudulent, and diplomas certifying the doctoral and higher doctoral degrees conferred after defending such theses to be illegal and subject to cancellation.

The key elements of the dissertation fraud detected in the course of Dissernet's analyses are as follows:

- Large-scale, bad faith and non-attributed plagiarism of other people's scientific works and other texts used by the authors of examined works in breach of the proper citation rules fixed in regulations of the Higher Attestation Commission (VAK) of the Ministry of Education and Science of Russia;
- Falsification of scientific research articles which, according to VAK regulations, are a mandatory prerequisite for awarding the respective academic degree to the applicant;
- Gross violations of the rules for thesis preparation (documenting performed research, interaction with the scientific research supervisor, advisor, opponents, co-authors, getting formal responses, etc.) as well as the procedure for defense of the thesis prescribed by VAK regulations.

Within the active phase of Dissernet's activity, which started in January 2013, its members have published results of examinations of thesis defended by scores of well-known and powerful Russian politicians and public figures. As of the middle of the year 2014, more than 2000 completed expertises of doctoral and higher doctoral theses in various directions and branches of science were contained in Dissernet database. Among the people attracting Dissernet's attention were deputies of the State Duma, members of the Federation Council, governors of constituent entities of the Russian Federation, high-ranking officials of executive authorities, heads of security and military services, etc.

== Community manifest ==
The "Dissernet Manifest", which was developed and agreed upon in June–July 2013, contains the declaration of the organizers and members about the basic objectives, tasks and principles of joint activity of the community members:

"Dissernet" is a networking community of experts, researchers and reporters seeking to unmask swindlers, forgers and liars. With their joint efforts based on the use of modern computer technologies and principles of networking division of labor, the community members oppose abusive practices, machinations and falsifications in the fields of scientific research and education, in particular in the process of defending theses and awarding academic degrees in Russia. The analytical work and disclosures of Dissernet equally cover various categories of Russian citizens:

- professional scientists or persons claiming to be such scientists without any valid basis.
- politicians and public figures seeking to improve their reputation and gain additional support and respect of their countrymen through defending theses and obtaining official diplomas conferring the doctoral and higher doctoral degree.

The Dissernet members act on a voluntary basis, on their own initiative and without any outside pressure. The examinations, studies and publications of Dissernet are in strict compliance with the laws of the Russian Federation and do not violate any copyright or other rights. Dissernet is under no obligations to any state authorities, governmental or administrative institutions, political associations or movements, commercial corporations or entities. Its members work in the community irrespective of their political, corporate or any other views, they do not pursue any commercial purposes, their efforts are not aimed at advertising or promotion of any product or trademark, and they do not set any other goals except the above-mentioned ones. Dissernet's expenses in connection with the fulfillment of its tasks are covered by means of voluntary donations by people sympathizing with its mission and sharing its views.

== Founders and activists ==
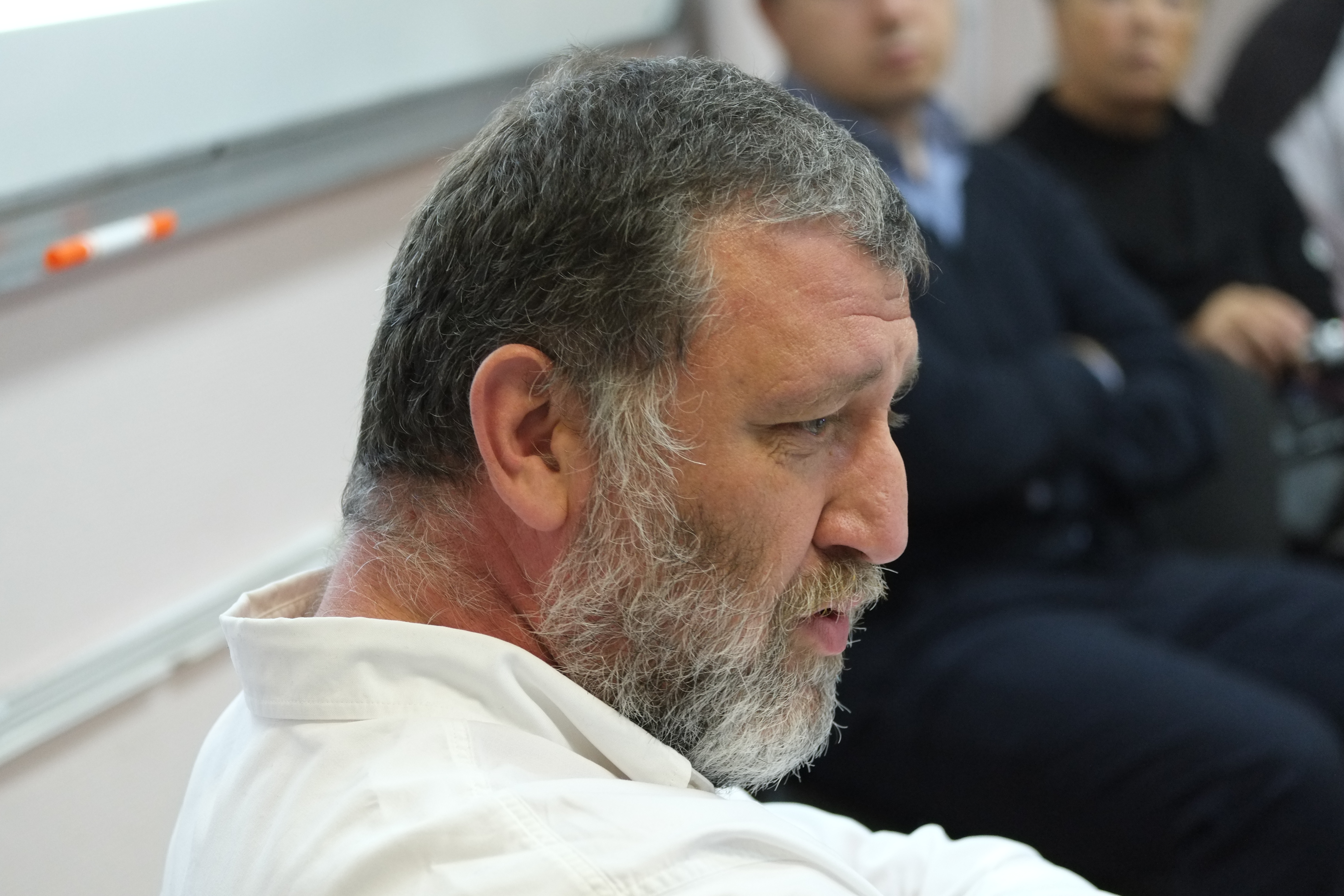
Serguei Parkhomenko presents Dissernet at a workshop in Higher School of Economics.

The community activists includes four co-founders:

- Mikhail Gelfand, Russian bio-informatics scientist, Higher Doctor of Biology, Doctor of Physics and Mathematics, deputy Director of the Institute for Information Transmission Problems at the Russian Academy of Sciences. (See SCIgen#Russia for related information.)
- Andrey Zayakin, Russian physicist, Dr.rer.nat. (LMU Munich, 2011), expert in the field of quantum chromodynamics and string theory, research fellow at the University of Santiago de Compostela (Spain).
- Sergey Parkhomenko, journalist and publisher.
- Andrey Rostovtsev, Russian scientist-physicist, Higher Doctor of Physics and Mathematics, Institute for Information Transmission Problems, Laboratory "Quantum physics and information".

There are also project coordinators.

- Larisa Melikhova: IT analyst, PhD in mathematics;
- Anna Abalkina: economist, PhD in economics, Doctor of Philosophy, University of Perugia;
- Ivan Babitsky: philologist-novelist, Doctor of Philosophy, University of Florence.

== Awards ==
On 28 February 2014, Sergey Parkhomenko received the "Golden Pen of Russia" award from the Russian Union of Journalists for the year 2013, recognizing his "Dissernet" activity in press and in Internet.

On 24 April 2014, the jury of the PolitProsvet Award 2014 conferred the Dissernet project with two awards, "For Honor and Dignity", and "People's Vote".

On November 20, 2014, the information partner of the Dissernet project, the newspaper Троицкий вариант — Наука, received a special prize of the Enlightener Prize.

In 2019, Dissernet was shortlisted for the final stage of the Yegor Gaidar Prize in the nomination "For actions contributing to the formation of civil society". The award in this nomination was received by the Sandarmokh project, which was warmly welcomed by the members of the Dissernet community: "We believe that this is our victory too. The victory of all those who do not forget about the case of Yuri Dmitriev".

In 2021, the project received the Yegor Gaidar Prize in the nomination "For actions contributing to the formation of civil society".

== Some published examinations ==
=== Examinations of doctoral theses ===
A number of prominent doctoral theses examinations published by the Dissernet community which dealt with well-known and powerful figures on the Russian political and scientific scene:

- Pavel Astakhov, Russian politician, attorney, TV presenter, writer, and Child Rights Ombudsman for the President of the Russian Federation
- O. Yu. Batalina, Russian politician, deputy of the State Duma of the 6th election from the United Russia party, and deputy secretary of the General Council of United Russia party.
- D. V. Gordeyuk, judge of the Moscow City Court.
- I. V. Lebedev, the chairman of the LDPR parliamentary group of the Russian State Duma and the LDPR Youth Organization. His father is Vladimir Zhirinovsky, chairman of the LDPR.
- V. R. Medinsky, Russian political figure, publicist and writer, Minister of Culture.
- O. L. Mitvol, Russian environmentalist, businessman and government official, the chair of environmental protection department.
- Sergey Naryshkin, Chairman of the State Duma and former chief of staff of the Putin administration
- N. A. Nikiforov, Russian politician, Minister of Communications and Mass Media of Russia.
- G. S. Poltavchenko, Russian politician, Governor of Saint-Petersburg, and retired Lieutenant-General of the Russian Tax Police.
- M. Yu. Sokolov, Minister for Transportation of the Russian Federation.

=== Examinations of books ===
Among examinations performed by Dissernet, there is a number of monographs. In particular, examinations of the following books have been published:

- A. I. Bastrykin, the Head of The Investigative Committee of Russia. His monograph Signs of the Hand. Dactyloscopy of 2004 has been analyzed.
- S. S. Sobyanin, Russian political figure, mayor of Moscow, previously served as the governor of Tyumen Oblast and Chief of staff of Presidential Administration of Russia. His doctoral thesis of 1999 and monograph of 2007 have been analyzed.
- S. E. Naryshkin, the Chairment of the Russian parliament. Along with his Doctoral thesis and higher doctorate thesis defended by S. E. Naryshkin, his monograph of 2005 "Foreign investment (regional aspect)" has also been analysed.

== Mass media coverage ==
The work of the Dissernet community has gained much publicity and has been broadly covered in Russian and foreign mass media. The result of the research performed by the Monitoring Center Public.Ru (more than 7500 federal and regional social and political and business printed matters, Internet mass media, news feeds of Press agencies, programs of central TV- and radio-channels have been analysed) showed that at 2013 year-end the word "Dissernet" was accepted as third by popularity neologism of the year, after the words "Euromaidan" and "titushky". Also the magazine Russian Reporter mentioned Dissernet's work among the most notable milestones of the year 2013, and the Internet edition The Village published an article about Dissernet in the dictionary "Summaries of 2013: main words and phrases of the outgoing year".

The magazine Kommersant, while listing in its concluding issue the major cultural and social events of 2013, devoted a separate article to Dissernet's struggle with falsifications and plagiarism.

== See also ==
- Academic ranks in Russia
- Diploma mill
- VroniPlag Wiki — a similar project in Germany

== Selected publications ==
- "Russia Child Rights Advocate Denies Plagiarism Charge". RIA Novosti. April 4, 2013.
- Von Bidder, Benjamin (April 15, 2013). "Wladimir Guttenberg". Der Spiegel (in German). No. 16.
- Khvostunova, Olga (May 8, 2013). "Plagiarism-gate". Institute of Modern Russia.
- Bowring, Bill (May 23, 2014). "Putin's dissertation and the revenge of RuNet". openDemocracy. Archived from the original on May 25, 2014.
- "Des responsables russes accusés de plagiat". Le Figaro (in French). January 28, 2014.
- Eremenko, Alexey (August 19, 2014). "Dissernet Activists Track Russian Officials With Black-Market Degrees". The Moscow Times.
- Taranova, Yulia (December 21, 2015). "Dissernet Dissernet: Fighting the Industry of Fake Reputations". Digital Russia.
- Neyfakh, Leon (May 22, 2016). "The Craziest Black Market in Russia". Slate. Archived from the original on December 30, 2016.
- "Russie : l'incroyable marché noir du plagiat". Le Vif (in French). May 23, 2016.
- "Akadeemiline elu Venemaal – iga viies diplomitöö on mustalt turult ostetud, poliitikud teevad plagiaati" (in Estonian). Delfi. May 23, 2016.
- "By Russian Standards, Melania Trump Would Be a Plagiarism Amateur". The New York Times. July 22, 2016.
- Kassian, Alexei; Larisa Melikhova (2019). "Russian Science Citation Index on the WoS platform: a critical assessment". Journal of Documentation. 75 (5): 1162–1168. doi:10.1108/JD-02-2019-0033. ISSN 0022-0418. S2CID 201888482.
- Dalmeet Singh Chawla (2020-01-08). "Russian journals retract more than 800 papers after 'bombshell' investigation". Science.
- Jochen Zenthöfer (2020-05-27). "Plagiate am Fließband" (in German). Frankfurter Allgemeine.
- Anna Abalkina (2020-07-07). "The case of the stolen journal". Retraction Watch.
- Anna Abalkina (2021-02-04). "Unethical Practices in Research and Publishing: Evidence from Russia". The Scholarly Kitchen.
- Dalmeet Singh Chawla (2022-04-06). "Russian site peddles paper authorship in reputable journals for up to $5000 a pop". Science.
