= Nucleic Acids Research =

- Discipline: Nucleic acids
- Language: English
- Edited by: Barry L. Stoddard, Keith R. Fox

Publication details
- History: 1974-present
- Publisher: Oxford University Press
- Frequency: Biweekly
- Open access: Yes
- Impact factor: 15.0 (2025)

Standard abbreviations
- ISO 4: Nucleic Acids Res.

Indexing
- CODEN: NARHAD
- ISSN: 0305-1048 (print); 1362-4962 (web)
- LCCN: 74641038
- OCLC no.: 01791693

Links
- Journal homepage; Online access; Online archive

Nucleic Acids Research is an open-access peer-reviewed scientific journal published since 1974 by the Oxford University Press. The journal covers research on nucleic acids, such as DNA and RNA, and related work. According to the Journal Citation Reports, the journal's 2025 impact factor is 15.0. The journal publishes two yearly special issues; the first issue of each year is dedicated to biological databases, published in January since 1993, and the other is devoted to papers describing web-based software resources of value to the biological community (web servers), published in July since 2003.

== Journal Rankings ==
Presented below is a summary of current bibliometric rankings for Nucleic Acids Research based on leading evaluation sources:

Rankings for Nucleic Acids Research by subject category (2023)
Source	Category	Rank	Percentile	Quartile
Scopus	Genetics in biochemistry, genetics and molecular biology	6/347	98.27	Q1
IF (Web of Science)	Biochemistry & molecular biology	6/313	98.20	Q1
JCI (Web of Science)	Biochemistry & molecular biology	6/313	98.08	Q1
