= Penile torsion =

Penile torsion is a fairly common congenital condition with male infants. It occurs up to about 1 in 80 newborn males. With this condition, the penis appears rotated on its axis, almost always to the left (counterclockwise).

== See also ==
- Chordee
