= Critical Reviews in Biotechnology =

- Discipline: Biotechnology
- Language: English
- Edited by: Inge Russell, PhD and Graham Stewart, PhD

Publication details
- History: First published 1978
- Publisher: Taylor and Francis Group
- Frequency: Quarterly
- Open access: No
- Impact factor: 9.062 (2021)

Standard abbreviations
- ISO 4: Crit. Rev. Biotechnol.

Indexing
- ISSN: 0738-8551 (print); 1549-7801 (web)

Links
- Journal homepage

Critical Reviews in Biotechnology is an academic journal that publishes comprehensive review articles that organize, evaluate and present the current status of issues in biotechnology.

According to Web of Science, the 2024 impact factor was 8.1, ranking the Critical Reviews in Biotechnology in the first quartile among the titles listed in the category "Biotechnology & Applied Microbiology".

== Core areas ==
The journal covers:

- applications of microbes in the biopharmaceutical, biomedical and food industries
- investigations of naturally occurring organisms for use as chemotherapeutic agents
- novel biotechnological applications of foods
- plant and animal matter as alternatives for human-made synthetic materials

The journal is owned by Taylor and Francis Group a United Kingdom-based publisher.

== Editors ==
The co-editors are Inge Russell, who co-founded the journal in 1978, and Graham Stewart Emeritus Professor in Brewing and Distilling at Heriot-Watt University, Edinburgh, Scotland.

== Publication format ==
The journal publishes 4 issues per year in simultaneous print and online editions and is available on a subscription basis and as individual articles All back-issues of the journal are available online on the publisher's website.

Subscribers to the electronic edition of Critical Reviews in Biotechnology receive access to the online archive, as part of their subscription.
