= Torsion field (pseudoscience) =

Unsupported hypothesis about effects of quantum spin

- Claims: Spin-spin interaction can be transmitted through space at speeds of at least up to 10^{9} times the speed of light via a special kind of field, making faster-than-light travel, extra-sensory perception, homeopathy, levitation, and other paranormal phenomena possible.
- Related scientific disciplines: Physics
- Year proposed: 1987
- Original proponents: A. Akimov, G. Shipov
- Subsequent proponents: A. A. Shpilman, J. Sarfatti, R. N. Boyd, Richard C. Hoagland, Lee Si-chen

A torsion field (also called axion field, spin field, spinor field, and microlepton field) is a reoccurring feature of many pseudoscientific proposals. It posits that the quantum spin of particles can be used to cause emanations to carry information through vacuum orders of magnitude faster than the speed of light.

== History ==
The first torsion field proposals were proposed in the late Soviet Union by a group of physicists in the 1980s who loosely based their ideas on Einstein–Cartan theory and some variant solutions of Maxwell's equations that do not have a solid grounding in scientific fact. The group, led by Anatoly Akimov and Gennady Shipov, began the research as the state-sponsored Center for Nontraditional Technologies. They disbanded in 1991 when their research was exposed by physicist Eugene Alexandrov as a fraud and an embezzlement of government funding. Akimov and Shipov received financing for torsion field research from the Russian Ministry of Science from 1992 to 1995 and from the Russian Ministry of Defense from 1996 to 1997, and secretly continued their research, with a private enterprise called The International Institute for Theoretical and Applied Physics (later called UVITOR).

Presently championed exclusively outside of reputable scientific research due to its lack of evidence and absence of sound theoretical underpinning, the theory has been used to proclaim faster-than-light travel (FTL), extra-sensory perception (ESP), homeopathy, levitation, and other paranormal phenomena, and has been used to provide a rationale for the purported functioning of miracle cures and similar products. These claims have no independent backing.

== Description ==
In physics, a field is an assignment of a quantity (vector, tensor, or spinor) to every point of the space containing it. The word "torsion" refers to any variable that describes rotation. Thus, torsion fields (i.e., fields of any physical value reasonably described as "torsion") do exist in established physics aside from in this pseudoscientific case, where the terms have been misappropriated. For example, an electromagnetic wave with circular polarization or the stress tensor of a solid body under torsion stress can be described as torsion fields, although such usage is rare. The torsion tensor is a quantity in general relativity, and plays an important role in Einstein–Cartan theory. Spinor fields, in particular fermionic fields, are existing concepts from particle physics and quantum field theory.

Advocates for the existence of the spinor field or torsion field as described here claim that spin-spin interaction – itself a well-studied quantum phenomenon – can be transmitted through space similar to electromagnetic waves, but transmitting no mass or energy but only information, and does so at speeds of up to a billion times the speed of light, in explicit violation of special relativity. At the same time they claim that spin-spin interaction is carried by neutrinos – which have very little mass and high energy and interact with matter through the weak interaction – that it does not interact with matter but, at the same time, can be generated and detected easily.

== Claimed applications ==
Despite the several obvious contradictions with established physics along with associated statements by believers criticized as being "nonsensical" by reputable scientists, torsion fields have been embraced as an explanation for claims of homeopathic cures, telepathy, telekinesis, levitation, clairvoyance, ESP, and other paranormal phenomena. The harnessing of torsion fields has been claimed to make everything possible from miracle cure devices (including devices that cure alcohol addiction) to working perpetual motion machines, stargates, UFO propulsion analogs, and weapons of mass destruction (WMDs). Some such devices, in particular the miracle cure boxes, have been patented, manufactured and sold.

== Funding of torsion-field-related projects ==
Proponents of torsion field have sought large-scale government and military contracts at different times, starting with the 1987 application to the Ministry of Defence of the USSR requesting funding to develop "highly-reliable detection of an enemy strategic weapons (ICBM, nuclear submarine, aircraft, etc.); the long-range destruction of enemy strategic weapons without contact; covert jamming-resistant communications with objects in outer space, on Earth, underground, and underwater; mobile equipment on gravitational principles; and psychophysical and biomedical influence on troops and the population" The Soviet government allocated 500 million rubles (about US$7 million at today's exchange rate) for this research.

Another example of such funding applications was an experiment conducted in 1994 by the Russian private research group "VENT" (VEnture for Non-traditional Technologies,) which claimed to lower the resistivity of copper to as little as 1/80 of its normal value after exposing it to a torsion field generator. The group applied to the government of the Russian Federation for funding to open a factory, and promised great savings in energy consumption. The samples of exposed and unexposed copper were independently tested in presence of a VENT representative and their resistivities were not only found to be identical [(2.08±0.02)×10^{−7} Ωm and (2.05±0.02)×10^{−7} Ωm], but worse than industrial copper as well (1.7×10^{−8} Ωm).

In 2002, an application was made for oil drilling licenses in Russia and the UK using "microlepton technologies".

On 23 May 2008, the Khrunichev State Research and Production Space Center launched the Yubileiny satellite. On it was installed a reactionless drive engine (along with other regular engines) based on "torsion field" technologies. In a debate after the launch, scientist and member of the Russian Academy of Sciences, Eduard Kruglyakov, concluded that the installed engine had not changed the satellite's orbit by even a micron.

In 2011, National Research Council of Thailand approved a 4 million baht (around $130,000) fund for "Torsion Field Technologies" research at Chulalongkorn University.
