= Allan Chumak =

Russian faith healer (1935–2017)

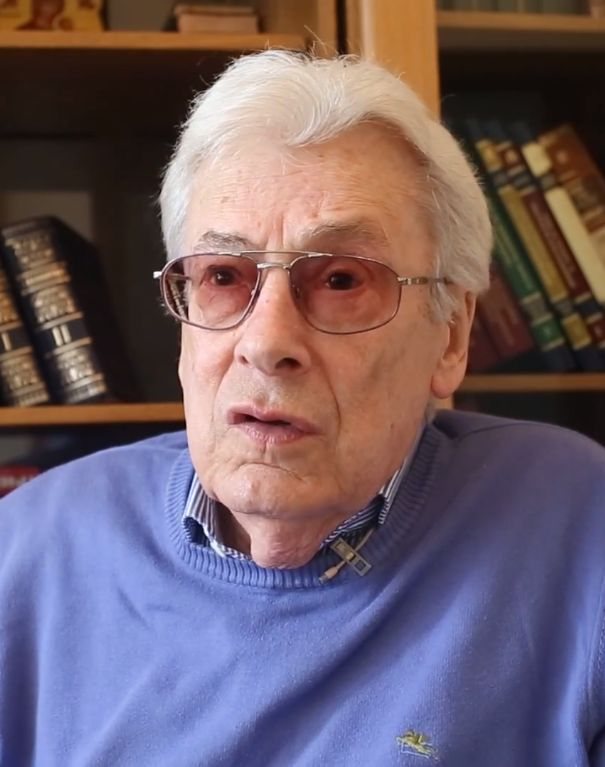
Allan Chumak in 2015

Allan Vladimirovich Chumak (Russian: А́ллан Влади́мирович Чума́к, 26 May 1935 – 9 October 2017) was a Russian faith healer who came to prominence at the height of Gorbachev's perestroika. When he appeared on television, his fans would hold jars of water next to their televisions in the hope that the water would be able to cure disease. At the height of his fame, he had a regular early morning television spot.

Chumak's performances typically followed a set formula. First he would state the malady that the program was intended to address, for example allergies and respiratory disorders. The disease would be explained as a disruption of the body's internal harmony. The remainder of the program would consist of reiki-like hand movements. Chumak said that these hand movements were intended to recalibrate the body's energy and cure the disease.

He was born in Moscow, and died there on 9 October 2017.
