= Last Address =

Civic initiative in Russia

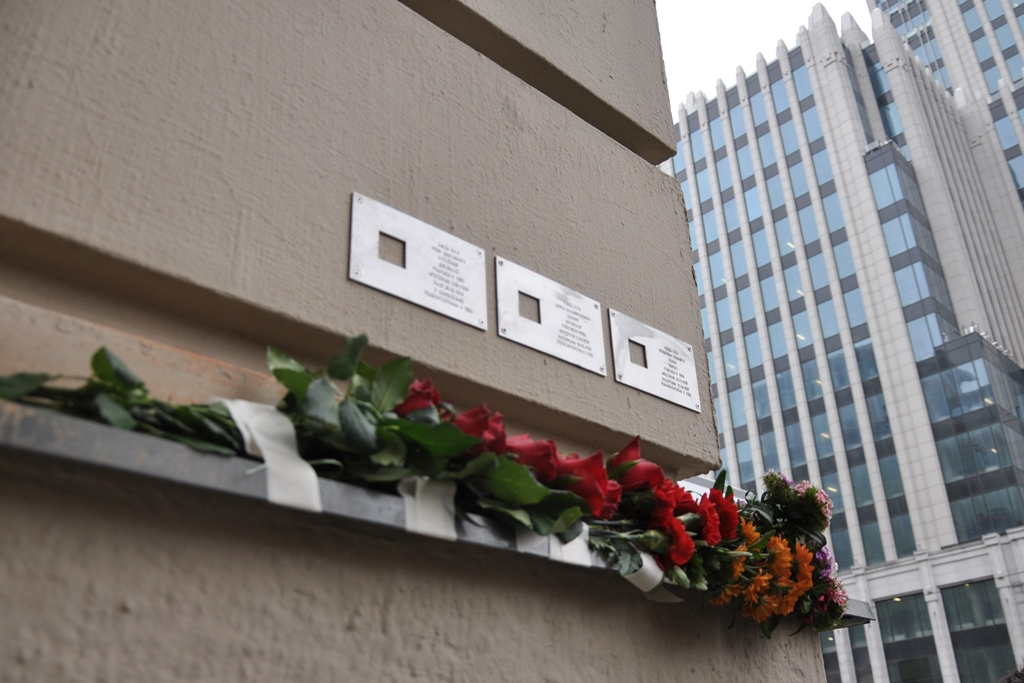
Signs on the wall of the "House of Widows". Moscow, Dolgorukovskaya Street, 5

The Last Address (Russian: "Последний адрес", romanized: "Posledny adres") is a large-scale public memorial project designed to commemorate the memory of innocent people who died as a result of political repressions committed by the Soviet authorities. Its principle is "One name, one life, one sign". Within the framework of the project, a small, palm-sized, minimalist metal memorial sign of rectangular shape is installed on the house that became the last lifetime address of the victim of state arbitrariness. It bears the name of the murdered person, their year of birth, profession, dates of arrest, death and year of legal rehabilitation. On the left side of the plaque is a square hole, reminiscent of a photograph missing from the card. The aggregate of many such personalized memorial signs forms a «network» memorial scattered in different cities around the world.

The Last Address is an entirely civic project and commemorative practice. Its key principle is that the initiative to install each plaque (as well as its payment) comes from one specific person who wanted to honor another specific person who died as a result of political repression. This can be a relative or close friend of the murdered person, or a resident of the house that became the last address of the victim, or any other person who considered such a step important for him or her.

The main source of information on victims of political repression for the project is the multi-million name database collected by Memorial since the 1990s. The Last Address is the de facto physical embodiment of this virtual list. Inspired by similar German memorial Stolpersteine, this project was launched in 2014. As of 2023, more than one and a half thousand memorial signs have been installed on houses in dozens of cities. Since 2017, the project went beyond Russia and became international: its signs began to be placed in the Czech Republic, Ukraine, Moldova, Georgia, Germany and France. At the same time, the authors and researchers note that the goal of the "Last Address" is not the installation of millions of signs "on every house", but the memory and reflection that arise as a result of the initiative.

== Structure and symbolism ==
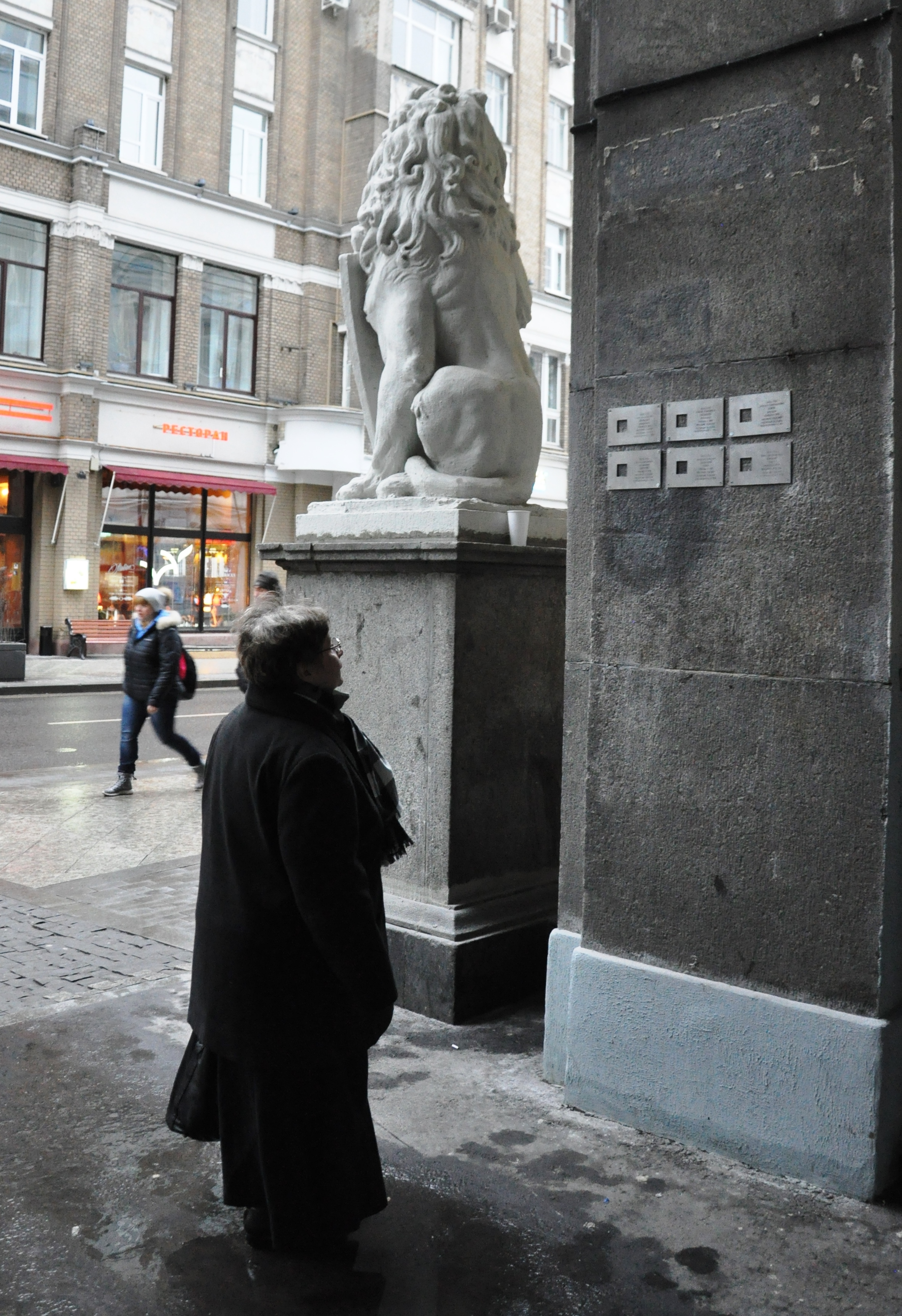
A passerby at the signs on the "House with a Lion". Moscow, Myasnitskaya Street, 15

Immediately after the October Revolution, the new authorities began a policy of state terror against the inhabitants of their country. According to researchers' estimates, during the existence of the Soviet regime millions of people suffered as a result of political repression, hundreds of thousands of them were killed. The memorial project The Last Address is intended to memorialize the innocent people who died as a result of the criminal actions of the Soviet state. In their work to create the memorial, civil activists rely on the 1991 Russian law "On the Rehabilitation of Victims of Political Repression". It defines the concept of political repressions, their time frame (from October 25 (November 7), 1917 to October 18, 1991), and proclaims the need to preserve the memory of the victims. In the framework of the project, an important moment for memorializing a person is his or her official legal rehabilitation, which demonstrates the illegality of the state's persecution of him or her.

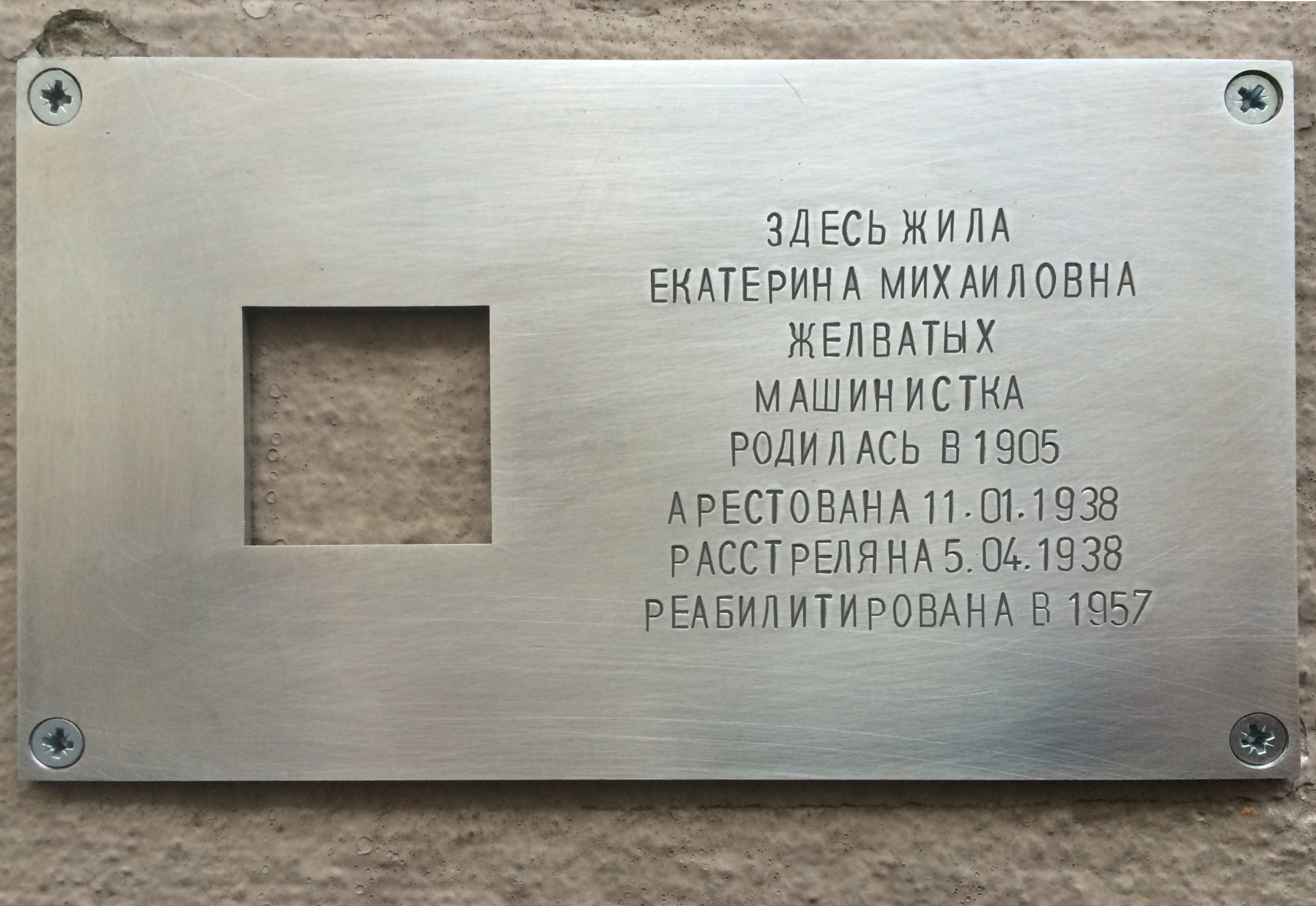
"Here lived Yekaterina Mikhailovna Zhelvatykh, typist, born in 1905, arrested January 11, 1938, executed April 5, 1938, rehabilitated in 1957"

The Last Address is a decentralized "networked" memorial consisting of many commemorative plaques installed in many cities around the world. They are created according to the principle of "One Name, One Life, One Sign". This means that each such plaque is made individually and is dedicated to one specific person who died as a result of state terror. The memorial sign is placed on the wall of the house that became the last lifetime address of the victim of political repression: the person was taken from it and never returned. The sign is a small, palm-sized or postcard-sized rectangular plaque, measuring 11 cm × 19 cm (4.3 by 7.5 inches), made of thick steel sheet. Its standard design was developed by architect Alexander Brodsky. Despite its minimalism, the sign is recognizable and expressive: it is a quiet, laconic sad statement. In the right part of the plaque in a simple "chopped" uppercase font, the text is handwritten in several lines, using stamps: "Here lived (-a) / <paternity name> / <family name> / <profession> / born (-as) in <year> / arrested (-a) <date> / shot (-a) <date> / rehabilitated (-a) in <year>". The exact dates of arrest and shooting (as well as the last address) are taken from the investigation file of the repressed. If the house is not preserved, the sign is placed next to this place, and the first line on it may read "At this place was the house where lived (a)...", "Next to this house was the house where lived (a)...", "Opposite was the house where lived (a)..." and so on. In cases where the victim's profession is unknown, this information is not placed on the sign. Occasionally in such a situation, the occupation, position or affiliation to an organization may be indicated. If a person died not as a result of a firing squad, then the line about death is modified depending on its circumstances. In the left part of the sign there is a small square hole, through it you can see the bare wall of the house, to which the sign is attached. It evokes an association with the photo missing from the card and symbolizes the emptiness, loss, formed after the death of a person.

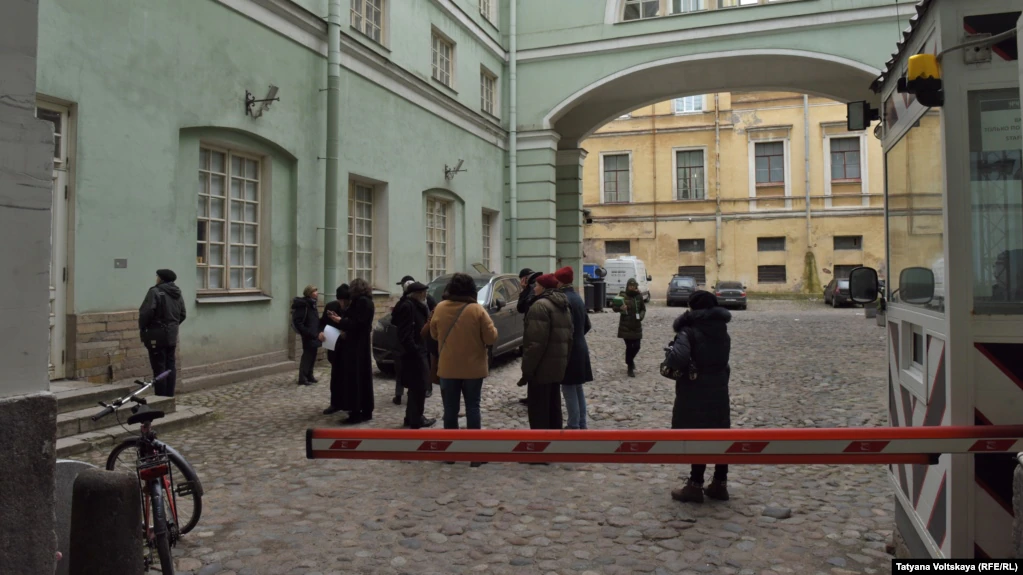
The plaque unveiling ceremony in the Hermitage Museum. St. Petersburg, Palace Embankment, 2

The plaques are installed so that they are clearly visible from the sidewalk. If several commemorative signs are placed on a house, project designers develop a special artistic solution for their arrangement on the wall. Plaques are installed not only on residential houses, but also on buildings that now belong to public or private legal entities. For example, in the fall of 2017, a memorial sign of orientalist Richard Fasmer was unveiled on the facade of the Hermitage Museum (Palace Embankment, 32), in the winter of 2018, the sign of accountant Alvina Peterson appeared on the wall of the chamber stage of the Bolshoi Theater (Nikolskaya Street, 17), and in the summer of 2019, the Novgorod Kremlin honored the memory of art historian Boris Shevyakov. Placing Last Address plaques at specific places of terror serves to maintain a sense of continuity with the past ("it was here"), which in turn contributes to the emotional personal experience of remembrance.

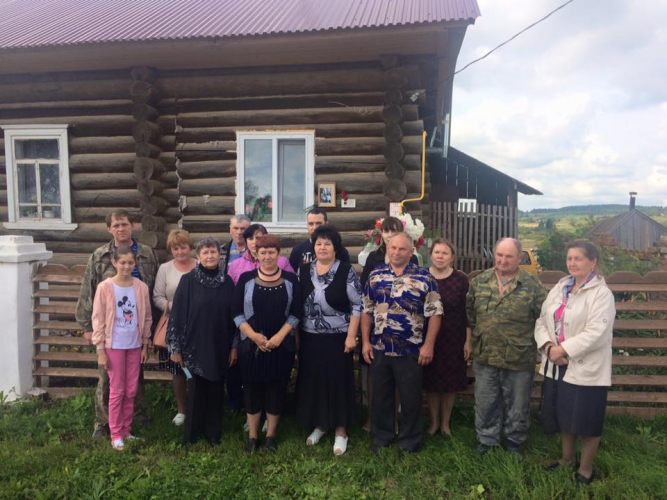
Unveiling ceremony of the plaque in the Perm village of Kupros, Sovetskaya St., 2

The Last Address as a memorial project has a number of peculiarities. Unlike the usual territorially localized monuments, its plaques are part of everyday material culture, being scattered in many places in many cities. Thus, on the one hand, visualization of the scale of mass repressions is achieved, and on the other hand, the audience of the memorial is maximized, because the plaques are visible to all people passing along the street - such a memorial is difficult to ignore. "Encounter" of people in public space with memorial signs makes them think. At the same time, while traditional memorials are dedicated to the memory of all victims as a whole, only sometimes singling out some of their groups, the Last Address preserves the memory of each individual. According to the idea of the authors of the project, the individual character of the memorial signs humanizes the "dry" and "faceless" statistics about the millions of victims of repression, the abstract nature of which does not arouse emotions. The "argument about history" and "geopolitics" turns into a "conversation about a person", a concrete fate, whose tragedy is hard not to empathize with. It is also of great importance to place memorial plaques not to a select group of famous people, but to all affected citizens. In this way, the authors of the memorial wanted to make people realize the importance of every human life and human life in general. The reference to profession serves to emphasize the idea that not only political figures were subjected to repression, but also the most ordinary people, be it a barmaid, a conductor, a historian, an engineer or an artist. The authors of the project draw attention to the fact that unlike memorial plaques to famous people who became victims of the gosterror, the plaques of the Last Address directly indicate the reason for their disappearance from their homes. An example of this duality of memory can be seen, for example, on the house of the genetic scientist Nikolai Vavilov. Historian Irine Karatsuba describes the project through an inversion of the pseudo-Stalinist aphorism "no person - no problem": the memorial sign, pointing to the literal "absence" of the victim of political repression, actualizes and problematizes the disappearance of the person. The authors of the project note that the graves of many repressed people are still unknown, making the Last Address plaque the only place where the memory of the deceased is preserved. Thus, the memorial sign is a tribute to the right of a person not to be forgotten. According to the idea of the project initiators, perpetuating the memory of the victims of political repressions of the past contributes to recognizing the value of life, human rights and freedoms in the present, as well as to preventing the repetition of the tragedies of state terror and totalitarianism in the future.

The geography of the memorial spans dozens of cities in several countries around the world. As of summer 2023, more than 1,500 plaques have been installed in more than 60 locations. Memorial plaques have also been placed in the Czech Republic, Ukraine, Moldova, Georgia, Germany and France. Activists from other countries, such as Poland, Latvia, Romania, Belarus, and Armenia have also expressed their desire to join the project. At the time of 2020, about 2,000 applications for the placement of memorial signs were registered. At the same time, the initiators emphasize that the ultimate goal of the project is not the installation of millions of plaques "on every house" (which seems unattainable), but the actualization, comprehension of the memory of political repression, which is achieved through the creation and existence of the memorial (and even attempts to destroy it). Researchers note that not only the memory "imprinted in stone" (materially, in the form of tablets) is important for society, but also "living" memory, memory as a process and people's attitudes, formed, among other things, through various events and discussions around the monument, which in this understanding acts only as a "means" of memory formation. It is also important that around a large-scale initiative to create a memorial a community of people for whom this memory is important is formed.

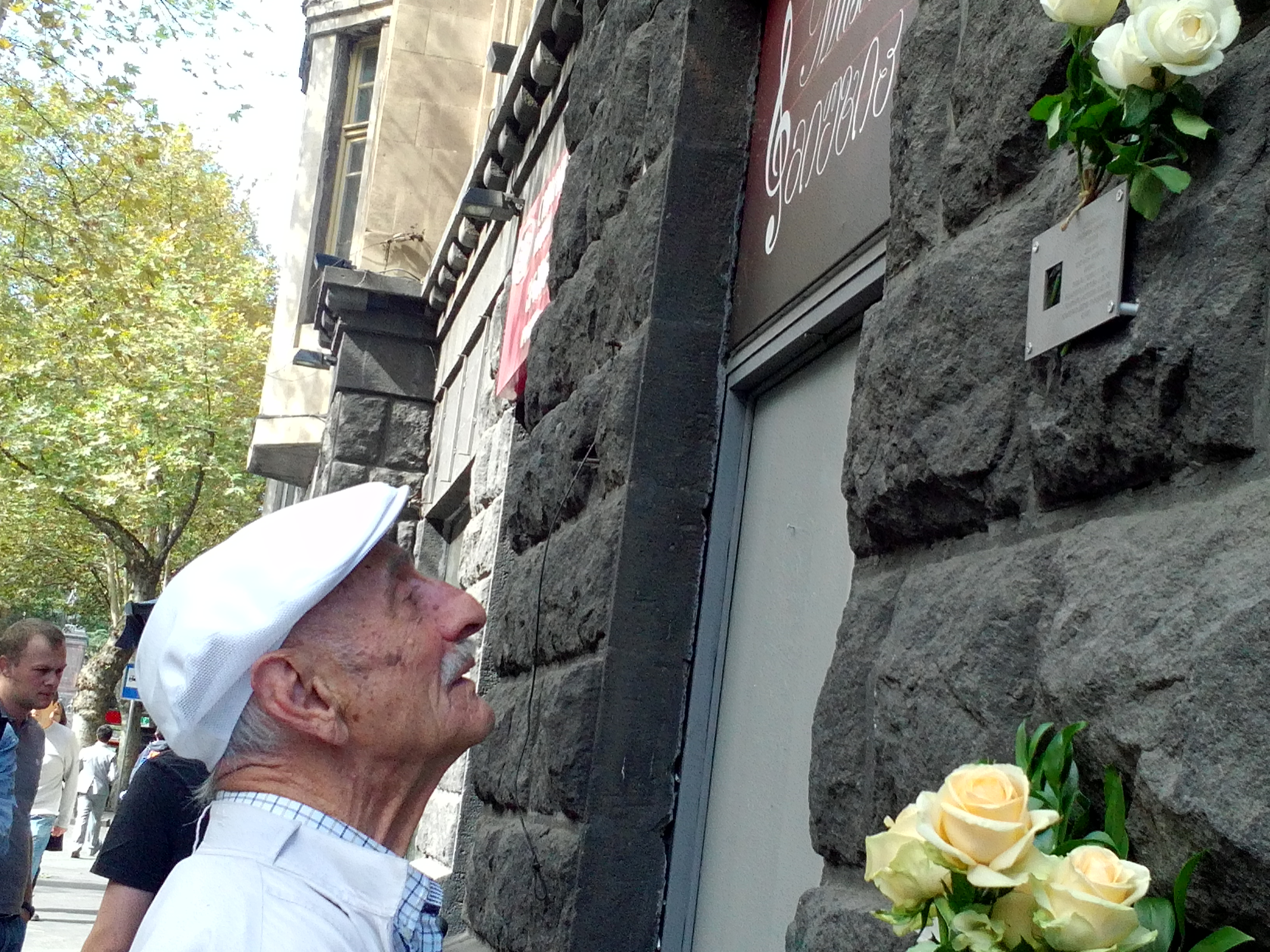
Sign in Tbilisi . Rustaveli Avenue, 37

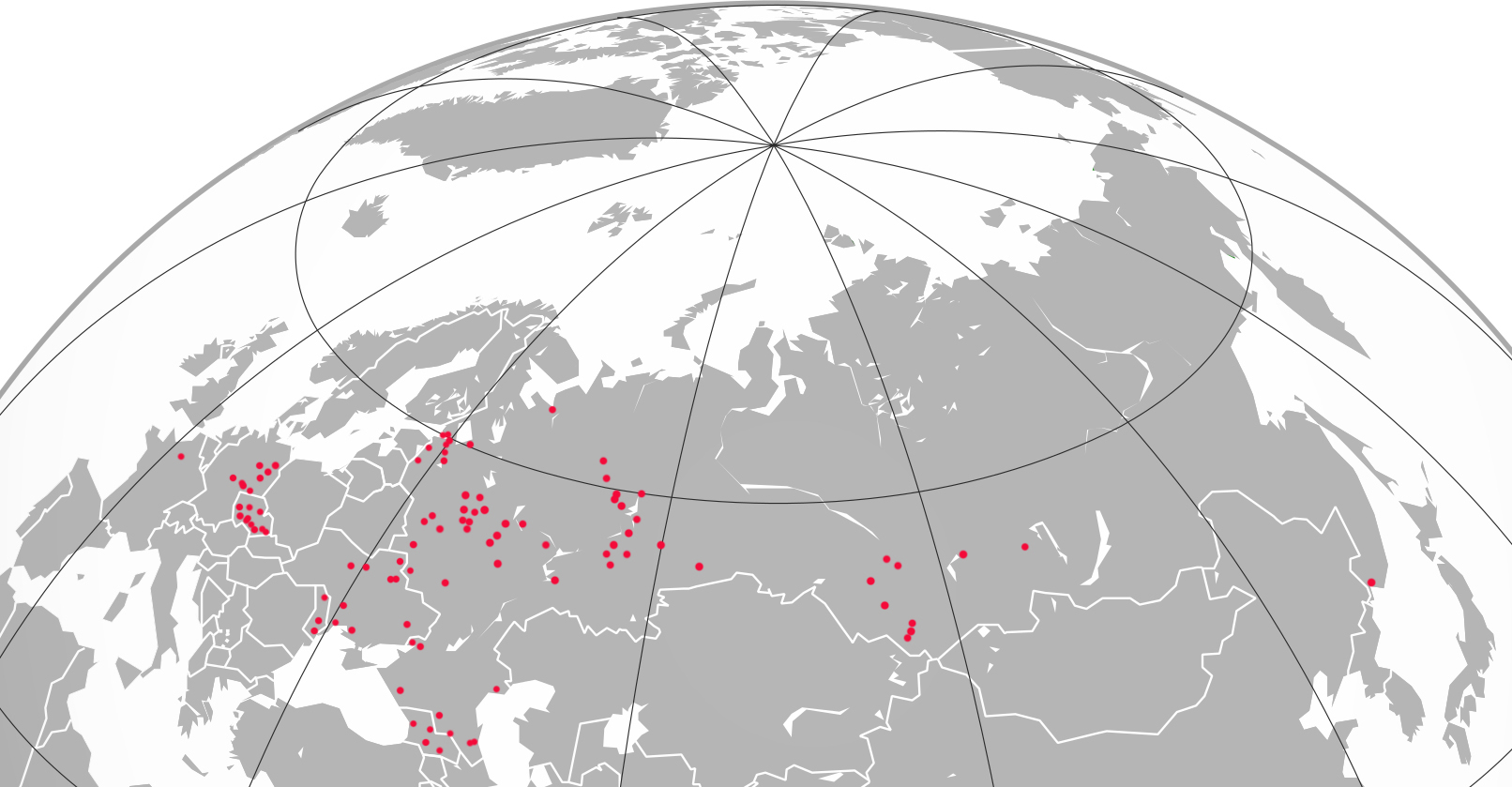
Geography of Last Address signs as of June 2024

== Functioning of the project ==
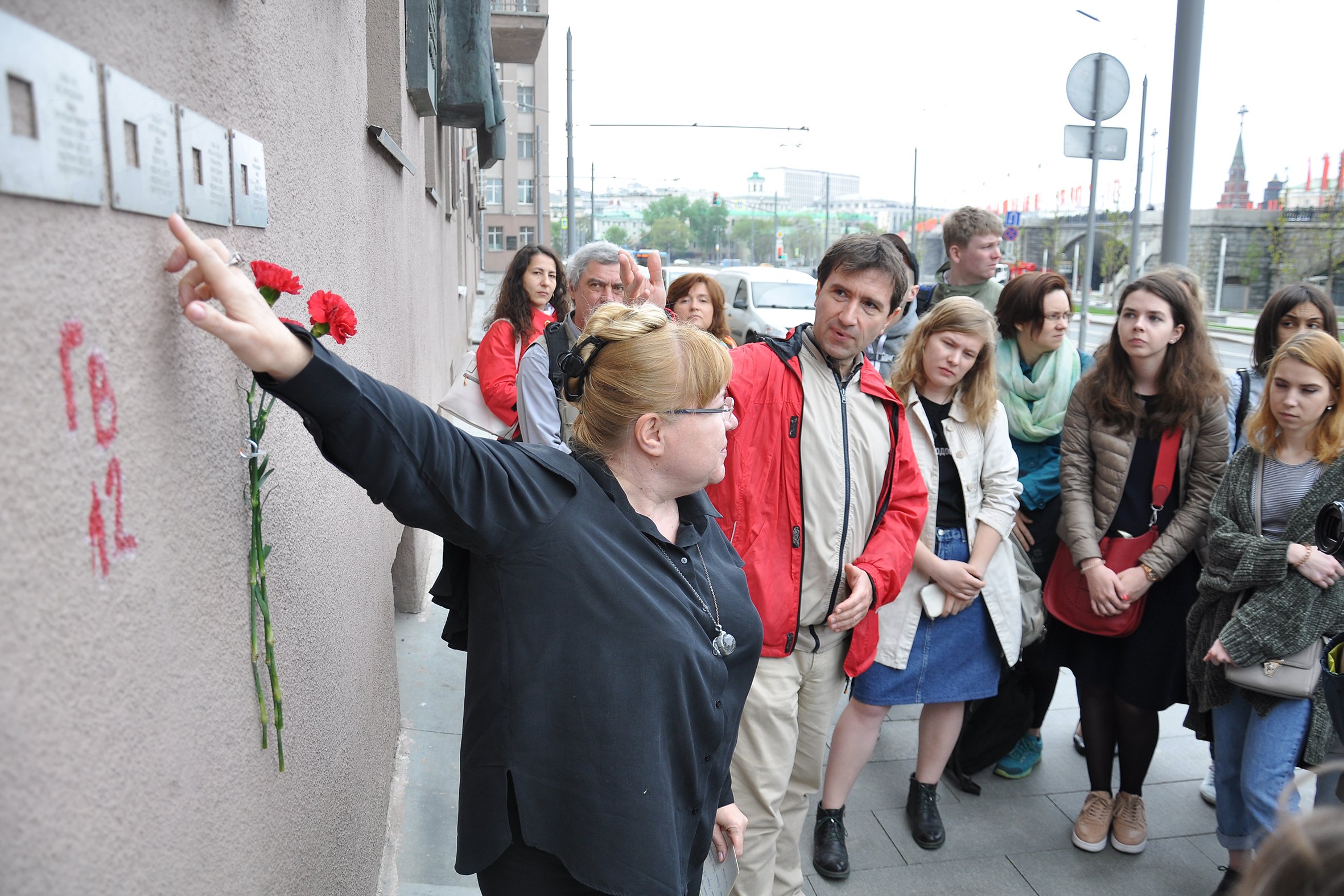
Lecture by Elena Zhemkova at the infamous "House on the Embankment". Moscow, Serafimovicha Street, 2

The key principle of the Last Address project is that the initiative to install each plaque comes from one specific person who wanted to honor the memory of another specific person who died as a result of Soviet political repression. This can be a relative or close friend of the victim, or a resident of the house that became the last address of the victim, or any other person who considers this step important for him or her. Such a person submits an application through the Last Address website. After all organizational issues have been resolved by the project team, he or she also makes a targeted donation for the production and installation of the memorial sign. The principle of personal participation in the creation of the memorial promotes a deep personal connection between the person now living and the person who died as a result of Soviet repression. In this way, the individual becomes more involved in the memorial project, and his or her responsibility and awareness of participation in it increases.

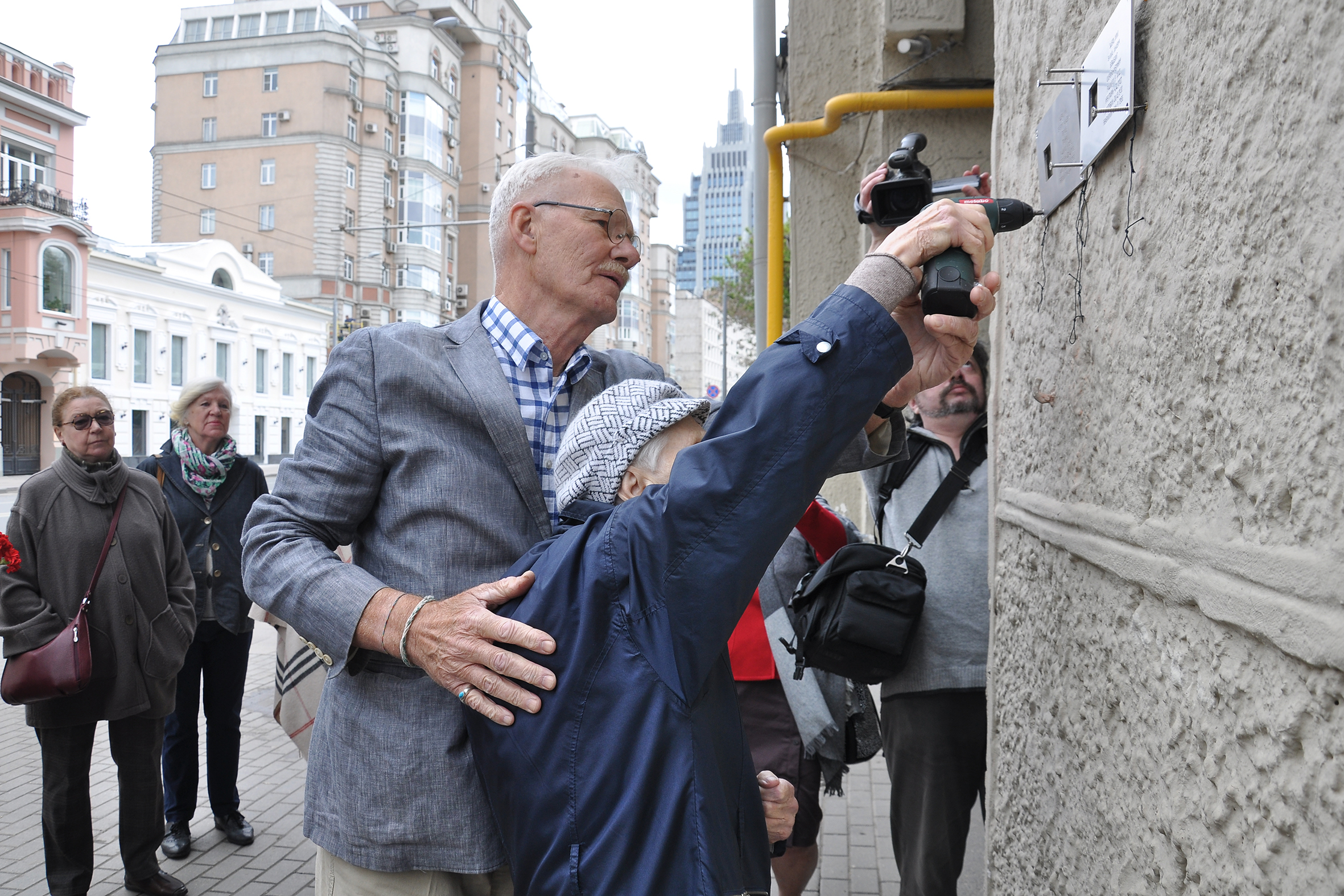
Relatives of the murdered man tightening screws of the memorial sign of turner G.Y. Trusle. Moscow, Dolgorukovskaya Street, 29

Another important aspect of the project the Last Address is that it is not implemented as a state program, but is actually a mass public initiative and commemorative practice[3] around which a whole civil movement has been built. Its core consists of historians, human rights activists, journalists, artists and other interested people. At the same time, in each individual city the installation of plaques is supported by a local group of activists. Thus, the Last Address is both an all-Russian initiative and a purely local one. The project team members are engaged in maintaining its website, databases on victims of repression and plaques, archival research, writing reports, coordinating the placement and organization of ceremonies for the unveiling of commemorative plaques, caring for them, and other related issues. All this work is carried out mainly on a volunteer basis. Funding of the project is fundamentally without government participation, as the initiators of the memorial position it as "people's". Such isolation is explained by activists by the fact that state programs are often of a formal nature, not affecting the living feelings of people, while for the formation of humanistic values in society it is society that must take an active part in the reflection of its tragic past. In order to coordinate the work of the project, the "Last Address" Foundation was established. Its operating costs are covered by private donations, as well as grants from organizations such as the Boris Yeltsin Presidential Center, the Memory Foundation, the Mikhail Prokhorov Foundation, and Bosco di Cilieg.

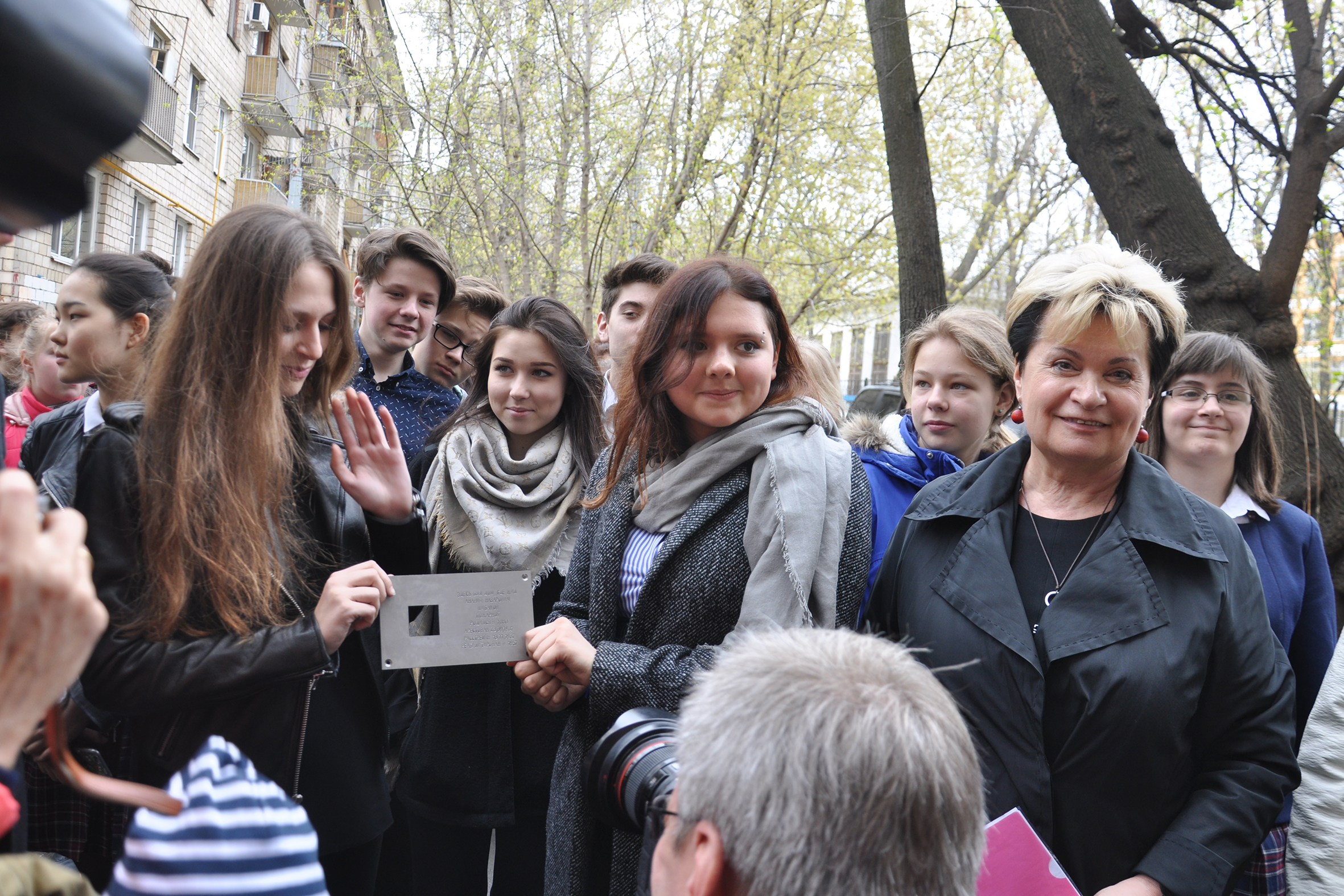
Schoolgirls-applicants at the unveiling of a sign to firefighter A.N. Shibanov in front of their school building. Moscow, Staroslobodsky pereulok, 2

After the application is submitted, the project participants check it. First, information about the victim of repression is correlated with the database. Then the project participants conduct additional research in state archives to clarify information about the circumstances of the murder. The "last address" of the victim of repressions is also checked (whether the house has been preserved, whether the numbering of the street houses has not changed) and her biography is studied.

After that, the project participants start the procedure of approving the installation of the memorial sign. When placing a sign on a residential building, the consent of its tenants-owners is required, and if the building belongs to any organization, its permission is required. In case of installation of the sign on the house-monument, which is under the protection of the state, the coordination is also held with the local authorities. In the course of negotiations with the residents of the house, the project volunteers conduct a lot of educational work among them: they tell about the history of political repressions, about the fate of specific victims who used to live at this address, about the importance of preserving the memory. If the owner refuses, the memorial sign is not placed on the building, as respect for rights and lack of coercion is a significant principle of the project. As the researchers note, such discussions themselves contribute to the formation of memory of political repression.

== Description ==
This project is important for such things not to happen again. Those who know nothing about repressions will ask questions when they see the signs. Those who had witnessed them will remember them one more time.

— Alexander Brodsky

The project is the initiative of Moscow and St. Petersburg historians, civic and civil rights activists, journalists, architects, designers and writers.

The project initiative had originated with journalist and publisher Sergey Parkhomenko, who saw in Germany the stones of the European Stolpersteine project to commemorate the victims of Nazism. Within the scope of that project, over 50,000 memorial stones were set up in Germany and other countries of Europe. The organizers of "Last Address" intend to install a comparable number of plaques across Russia.

The project is based on the law “On the Rehabilitation of the Victims of Political Repressions” adopted in 1991. The law treats the period of political repressions in Russia and USSR as starting on 25 October (7 November) 1917. The official representative of the project is the nonprofit entity Last Address Foundation for the Commemoration of Victims of Political Repression (Russian: Фонд увековечения памяти жертв политических репрессий «Последний Адрес») founded by the Memorial Society and a number of individual persons through voluntary contributions from private citizens and organizations.

On 15 June 2018 "The last address" received a German Karl Wilhelm Fricke award. Its monetary part will be sent to the Ukrainian project "Ostannya Addresa", in order to avoid the status of a "foreign agent".

== Installing memorial signs in Russia ==
The first Russian cities to install memorial signs became Moscow and Saint Petersburg. On 7 February 2020, the thousandth memorial sign was installed in Russia: in the city of Gorokhovets, Vladimir Oblast. By that moment the plaques were also installed in the following cities: Yekaterinburg, Rostov-on-Don, Perm, Taganrog, Barnaul, Krasnoyarsk, etc.

=== In Moscow ===
The first memorial signs of “Last Address” project were installed in Moscow on Human Rights Day, 10 December 2014. Some of the signs were made in response to applications of the residents of houses where repressed people had lived.

The next batch of signs was installed in February–March 2015. By January 2015, over 500 applications for the installation of memorial sign had been submitted. Since 2016, the installation of memorial signs is being performed usually 2 times per month.

=== In St. Petersburg ===
The first 12 memorial signs on the houses of Saint Petersburg were installed on 21–22 March 2015.

=== In Perm and Perm Krai ===
“Last Address” was launched in Perm in February 2014. The first four plaques were installed on 10 August 2015. The project founder Serguei Parkhomenko came from Moscow to Perm; in an interview to Zvezda magazine he talked about the ways to launch an initiative group, what the cases of the repressed were telling us and whether it was necessary or advisable to install signs commemorating the organizers of repressions.

The first village with a “Last Address” sign was the village Kupros of Yusvinsky District, Komi-Permyak Okrug. The memorial sign was installed on 11 August 2015 on the façade of the house that was the last residential address of peasant Valentin Startsev, declared by investigators "an active participant of the liquidated counterrevolutionary insurgent organization." Investigators claimed that Startsev was "conducting counterrevolutionary defeatist agitation among kolkhoz members, trying to prove the inevitability of the fall of Soviet power," "praising the old Tsarist regime and proving unprofitability of kolkhozes"; as a result, he was sentenced to capital punishment in the form of execution by a firing squad.

== Vandalism and resistance ==
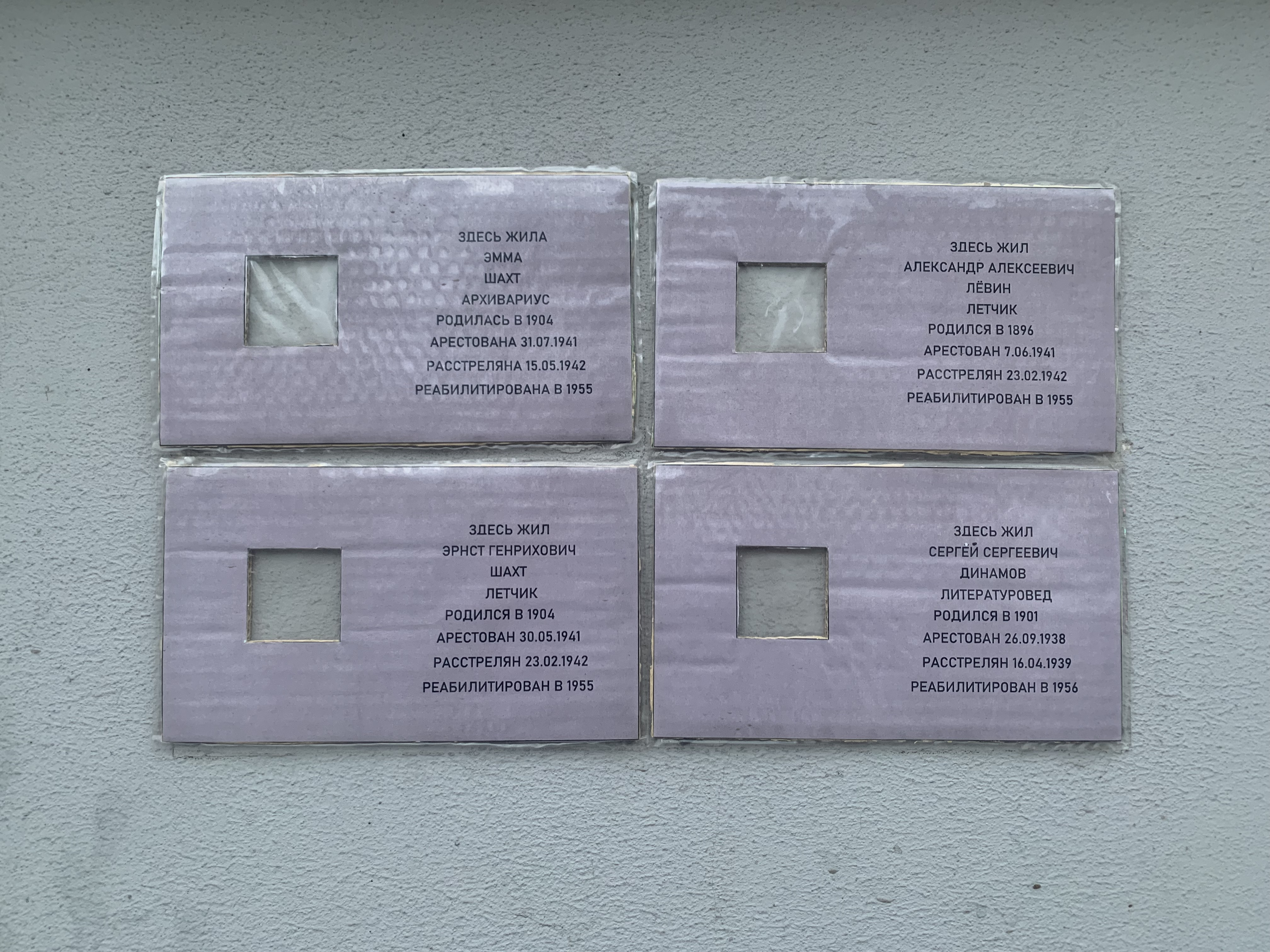
Cardboard Last Address signs in Pushkinskaya Square, Moscow. April 25, 2025

Since 2022, after the outbreak of full-scale war with Ukraine, rare cases of plaque disappearances in Moscow and St. Petersburg have become widespread, project activists tried to restore them as best they could.

After some time, a resistance movement appeared: volunteers began making handwritten cardboard copies of the memorial plaques and gluing them in place of those torn down. In 2024, a community of volunteers emerged in Moscow who learned to coordinate their efforts. Young people are making cardboard copies en masse, tracking where plaques (or copies) have disappeared from, and replacing them with new ones.

== Installing memorial signs in other countries ==
The first country outside Russia became Ukraine, where a separate project "Остання адреса – Україна" based on Russian "Last address" started working. On 5 May 2017 the first three commemorative plaques were installed on three houses in Kyiv.

On 7 June 2017, on the day of political prisoners, signs of the Last address appeared on the facades of four houses in Prague.

On 2 August 2018, the Ultima adresa project was launched in Moldova: the first two plates of the “Last Address” appeared in Chișinău.

On 5 October 2018, the Georgian project "უკანასკნელი მისამართი. საქართველო", "Last Address, Georgia" officially started.

On 30 August 2019, the first commemorative plaque appeared in Germany, in the Thuringian city of Treffurt.

On 25 September 2022, the first commemorative plaque was installed in France, in the Parisian suburb of Boulogne-Billancourt.

== General references ==
- Haskins, Ekaterina V. «One Name, One Life, One Sign»: The Resistant Memory Commons of the Last Address Project in Russia // History & Memory. — Bloomington: Indiana University Press, 2026. — Spring/Summer (vol. 38, no. 1). — P. 74-105. — ISSN 0935-560X. — doi:10.2979/ham.00030.
- Веселов Ф. Д.. Глава 11. Последний адрес: негосударственный мемориальный проект и политика памяти в России // Политика памяти в современной России и странах Восточной Европы. Акторы, институты, нарративы / ред. А. И. Миллер, Д. В. Ефременко. — СПб.: Издательство Европейского университета в Санкт-Петербурге, 2020. — С. 202—231. — 632 с. — ISBN 978-5-94380-289-8.
- Дубина Вера. Виртуальное место памяти и реальное пространство ГУЛАГа в современной России // Политика аффекта. Музей как пространство публичной истории / ред. Завадский Андрей, Склез Варвара, Суверина Катерина. — М.: Новое литературное обозрение, 2019. — С. 334—335. — 400 с. — (Интеллектуальная история). — ISBN 978-5-4448-1101-6.
- Еремеева С. А.. Глава 2. Жизнь побеждает смерть неизвестным способом // Память: поле битвы или поле жатвы?. — М.: «Дело» РАНХиГС, 2021. — 360 с. — ISBN 978-5-85006-273-6.
- Курилла И. И.. История V // Битва за прошлое: Как политика меняет историю. — М.: Альпина Паблишер, 2022. — С. 97—100. — 232 с. — ISBN 9785961474947, ISBN 5961474941.
- Коммеморативные практики / В. А. Шнирельман // Большая российская энциклопедия [Электронный ресурс]. — 2023.
- Эппле Н. В.. Неудобное прошлое. Память о государственных преступлениях в России и других странах. — М.: Новое литературное обозрение, 2020. — 576 с. — ISBN 978-5-4448-1237-2
