= Yubileiny =

Russian satellite

- Mission type: Technology/Amateur radio
- Operator: NPO PM
- COSPAR ID: 2008-025A
- SATCAT no.: 32953
- Mission duration: 1 year

Start of mission
- Launch date: 23 May 2008
- Rocket: Rokot/Briz-KM
- Launch site: Plesetsk 133/3

Orbital parameters
- Reference system: Geocentric
- Regime: Low Earth

Transponders
- Frequency: 435.215 and 435.315 MHz

Yubileiny (Russian: Юбиле́йный, lit. Jubilee) is an educational Russian satellite built by NPO PM to commemorate the 50th anniversary of the launch of Sputnik 1, the first artificial satellite to be placed into Earth orbit. The satellite was launched on 23 May 2008 aboard a Rokot class rocket from the LC-133 launch facility at the Plesetsk Cosmodrome, after being delayed since the end of 2007. It was a secondary payload accompanying a cluster of three Gonets communication satellites, and utilised the excess capacity of the carrier.

The satellite mission was to broadcast audio and video about the Soviet and Russian space programmes, as well as to imitate the beeping call signals of Sputnik 1. These signals are intended for being receipted by amateur radio enthusiasts.

== Reactionless drive scandal ==
In April 2009 Russian news media reported that a 'reactionless drive' had been tested on the spacecraft. "Specialists of the Institute for Space Systems conducted successful tests of the perpetual motion machine in space," wrote Pravda in Moscow. The mentioned Institute for Space Systems was a satellite project contractor and its director Valery Menshikov also headed the funding agency supported the launch. According to media, Valery Menshikov announced that a reactionless "machine was installed in the Yubileiny satellite, which was launched into orbit almost a year ago. The satellite can now move from one orbit to another with the help of the engine, which discharges no reaction mass". Menshikov continued, in a claim not verified by any Western space source: "The first tests were conducted in June and July of 2008. The tests revealed some problems that need further developments of the machine, but the orbital experiment was conducted successfully in general." The engine was designed and made by Fominskiy Leonid Pavlovich.

These pseudo-scientific statements by a highly ranked industry manager resulted in a scandal in Russia. Some scientists warned that the installed 'reactionless engine' is based on a tricky non-linear friction in bearings and cannot work in zero gravity. In 2011, the discussion was summed up by notable scientist and member of the Russian Academy of Sciences, Eduard Kruglyakov, who wrote that the installed engine had not changed the satellite's orbit by even a micron. The Roscosmos officials commented that the 'reactionless drive' part was installed initially to keep the mass balance and could not be removed after its actual role had been revealed.
