= Mikhail Gelfand =

Russian Bioinformaticist and molecular biologist

- Михаил Гельфанд
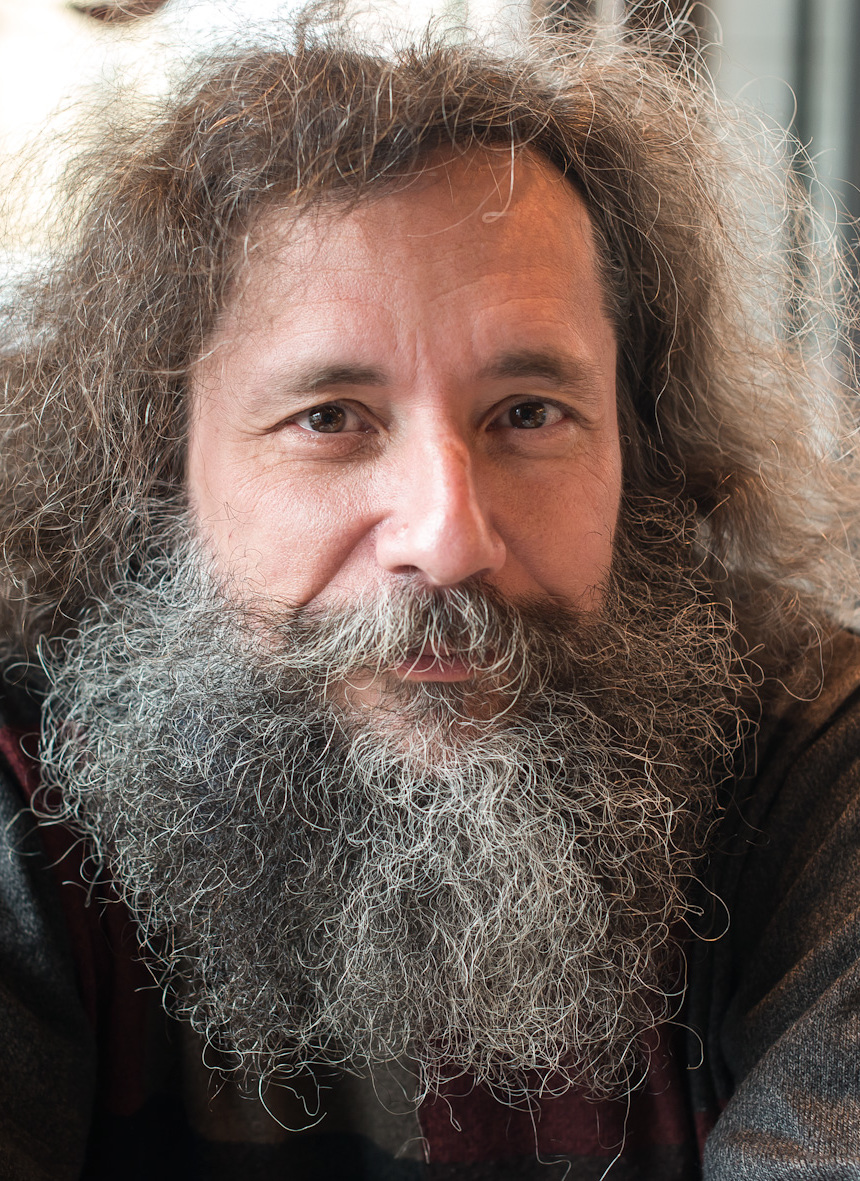
- Gelfand in 2013
- Born: 25 October 1963 (age 62); Moscow, Russian SFSR, Soviet Union
- Citizenship: Soviet Union, Russian Federation
- Education: MSU Faculty of Mechanics and Mathematics
- Scientific career
- Fields: Bioinformatics, molecular biology
- Workplaces: Russian Academy of Sciences; Skolkovo Institute of Science and Technology; Higher School of Economics
- Doctoral advisor: Simon Gindikin
- Mikhail Gelfand's voice Mikhail Gelfand on the Echo of Moscow program, 8 March 2011

Mikhail Sergeyevich Gelfand (Russian: Михаил Сергеевич Гельфанд; born 25 October 1963) is a Russian bioinformaticist and molecular biologist. He is a member of Academia Europaea, Vice President Biomedical Research of Skolkovo Institute of Science and Technology, one of the founder of Dissernet plagiarism fighting society and a political activist, former member of Russian Opposition Coordination Council. He is a grandson of a prominent Soviet mathematician Israel Gelfand.

== Awards and honors ==
In 2022, Gelfand was elected as a Fellow of the International Society for Computational Biology.

== Selected works ==
- Gelfand M. S. Statistical analysis of mammalian pre-mRNA splicing sites // Nucleic Acids Research. 1989. V. 17. N. 15. 6369–6382.
- Gelfand M. S. Computer prediction of the exon-intron structure of mammalian pre-mRNAs // Nucleic Acids Research. 1990. Y. 18. N. 19. P. 5865–5869.
- Gelfand M. S. Statistical analysis and prediction of the exonic structure of human genes // Journal of Molecular Evolution. 1992. Y. 35. N. 2. P. 239–252.
- Gelfand M. S. Genetic language: metaphore or analogy // BioSystems. 1993. V. 30. P. 277—288
- Pevzner Р. А., Gelfand M. S., eds. Computer Genetics. A special issue on computational molecular biology // BioSystems. 1993. V. 30.
- Gelfand M. S., Mironov A. A., Pevzner P. A. Spliced alignment: a new approach to gene recognition // Lecture Notes in Computer Science. 1996. V. 1075. P. 141–158.
- Gelfand M. S., Mironov A. A., Pevzner P. A. Gene recognition via spliced sequence alignment // Proceedings of the National Academy of Sciences. 1996. V. 93. P. 9061–9066.
- Gelfand M. S., Koonin E. V. Avoidance of palindromic words in bacterial and archaeal genomes: a close connection with restriction enzymes // Nucleic Acids Research. 1997. V. 27. P. 2430–2439.
- Sze S.-H, Roytberg М. А., Gelfand M. S., Mironov A. A., Astakhova T. V., Pevzner P. A. Algorithms and software for support of gene identification experiments // Bioinformatics
- Mironov A. A., Roytberg M. A., Pevzner P. A., Gelfand M. S. Performance guarantee gene predictions via spliced alignment // Genomics
