= 2012 Russian Opposition Coordination Council election =

2012 Russian Opposition Coordination Council election (Common Civil list)
- 20–22 October 2012
- Registered: 170,012 (97,727 verified)
- Turnout: 47.83%
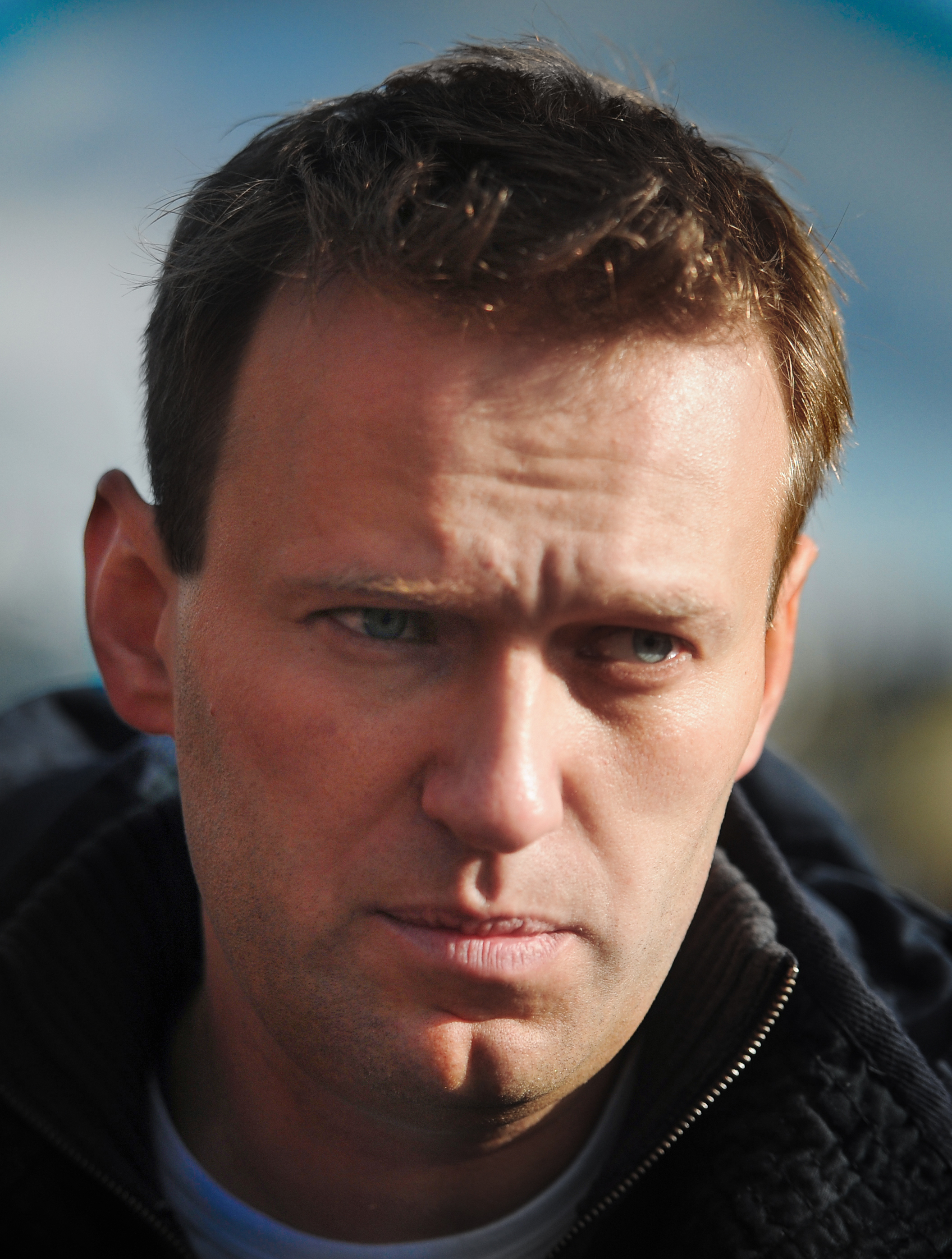

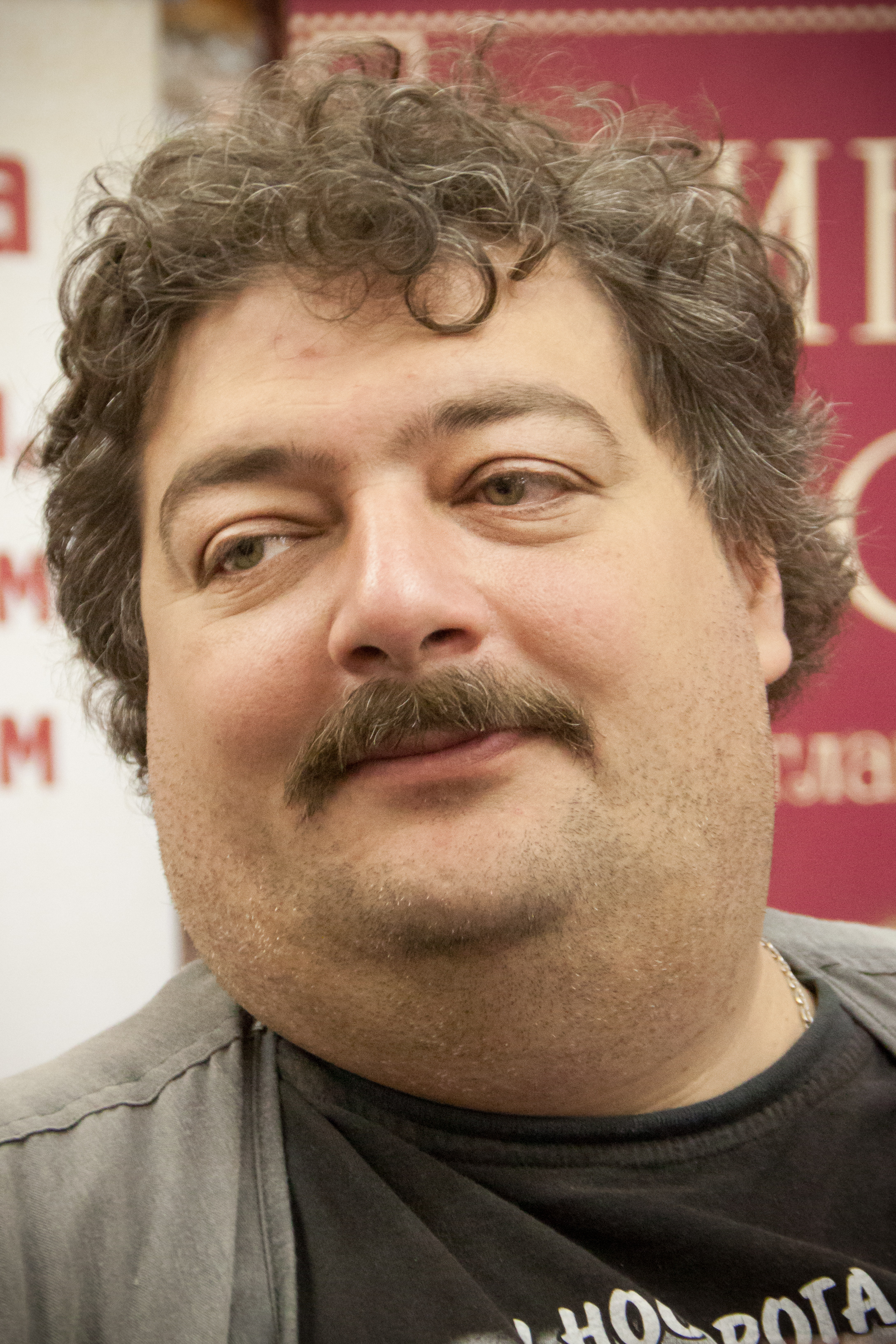

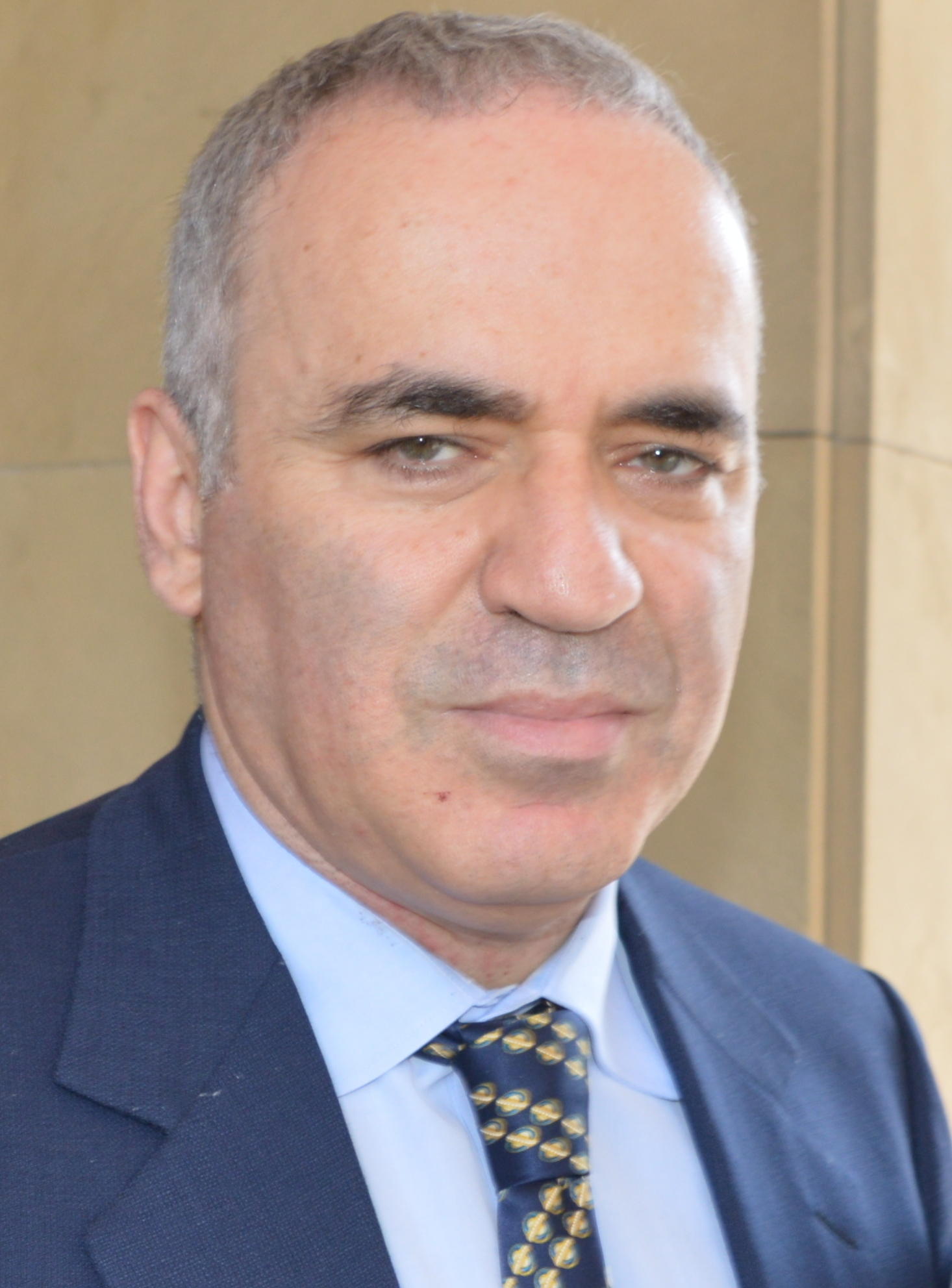

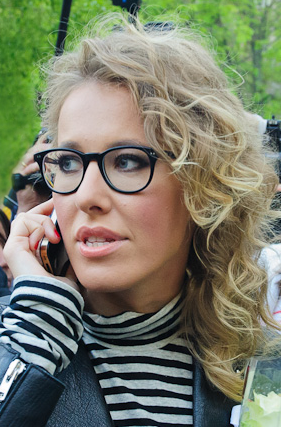

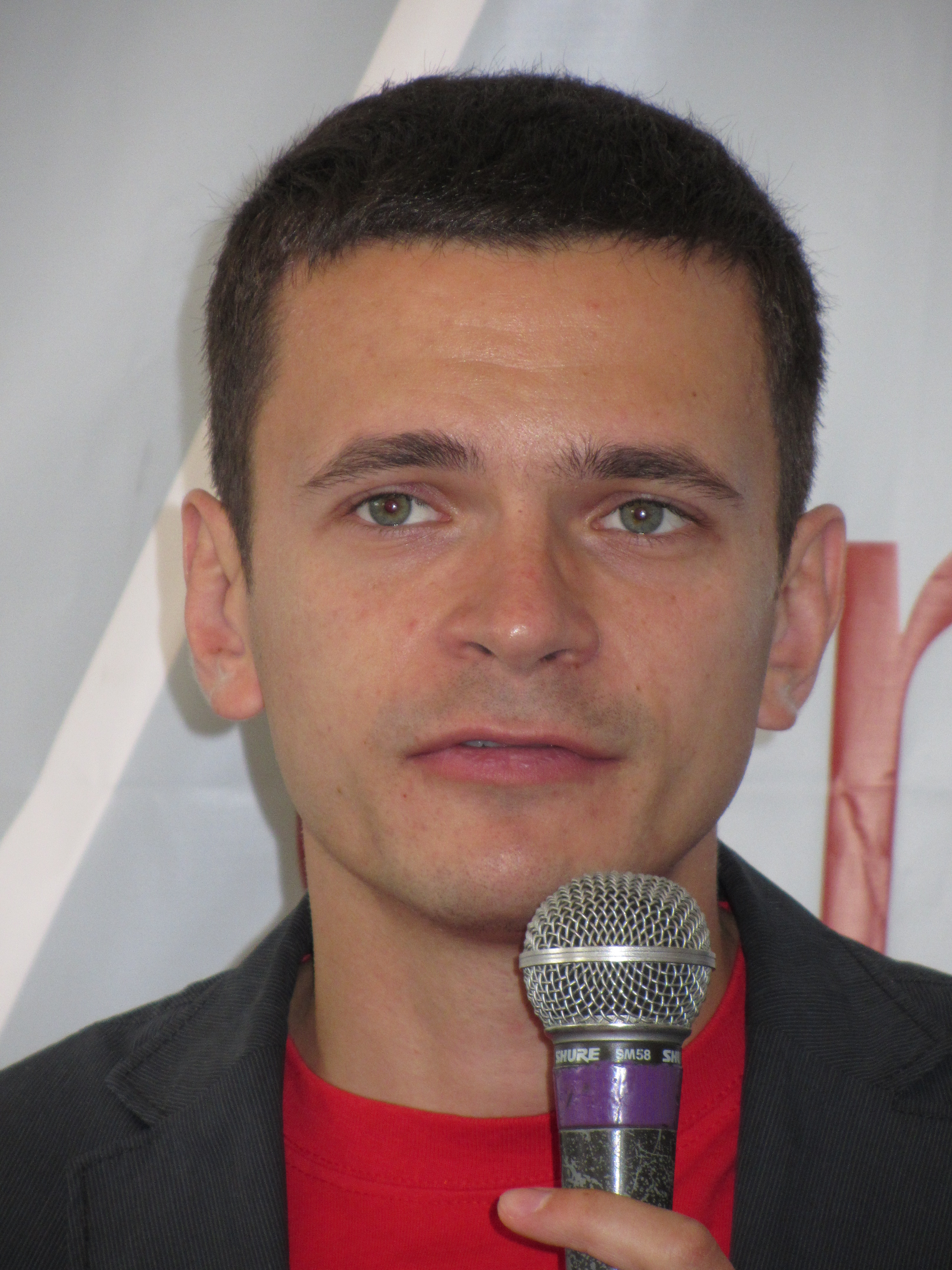

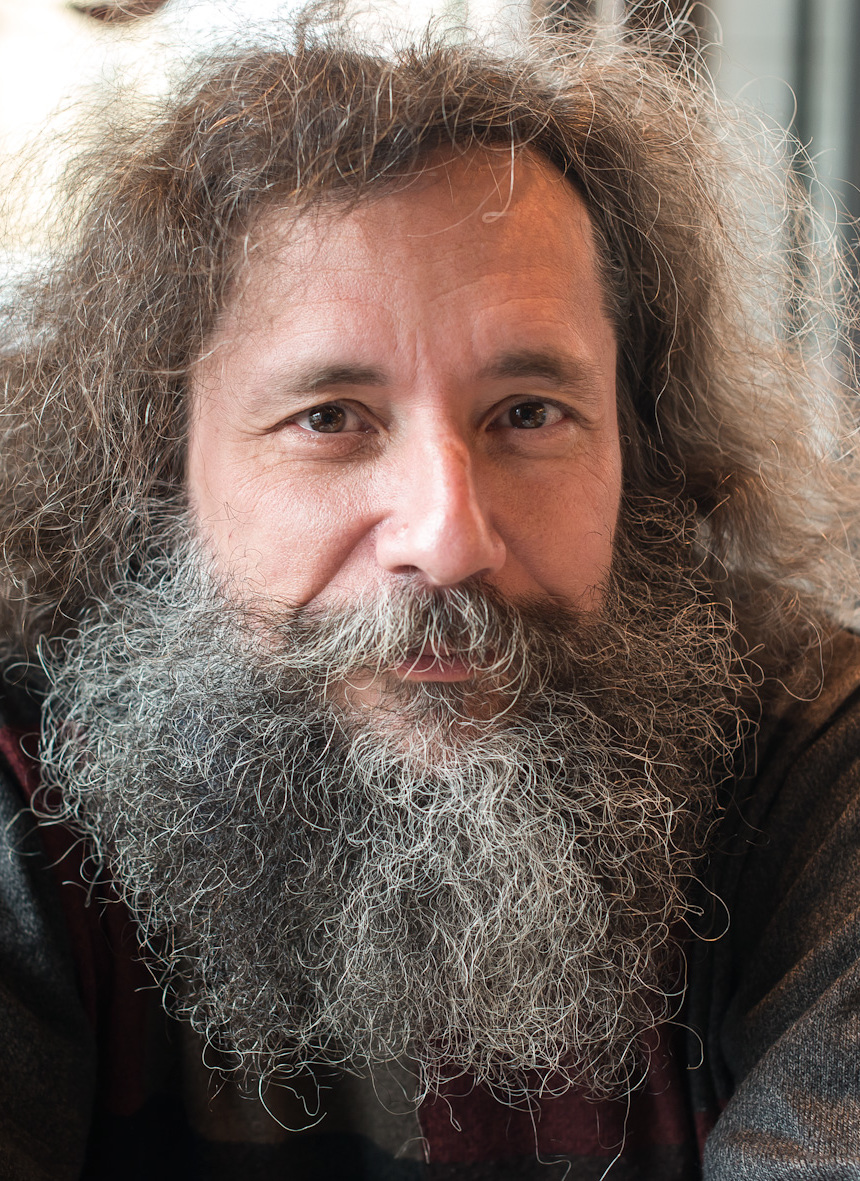

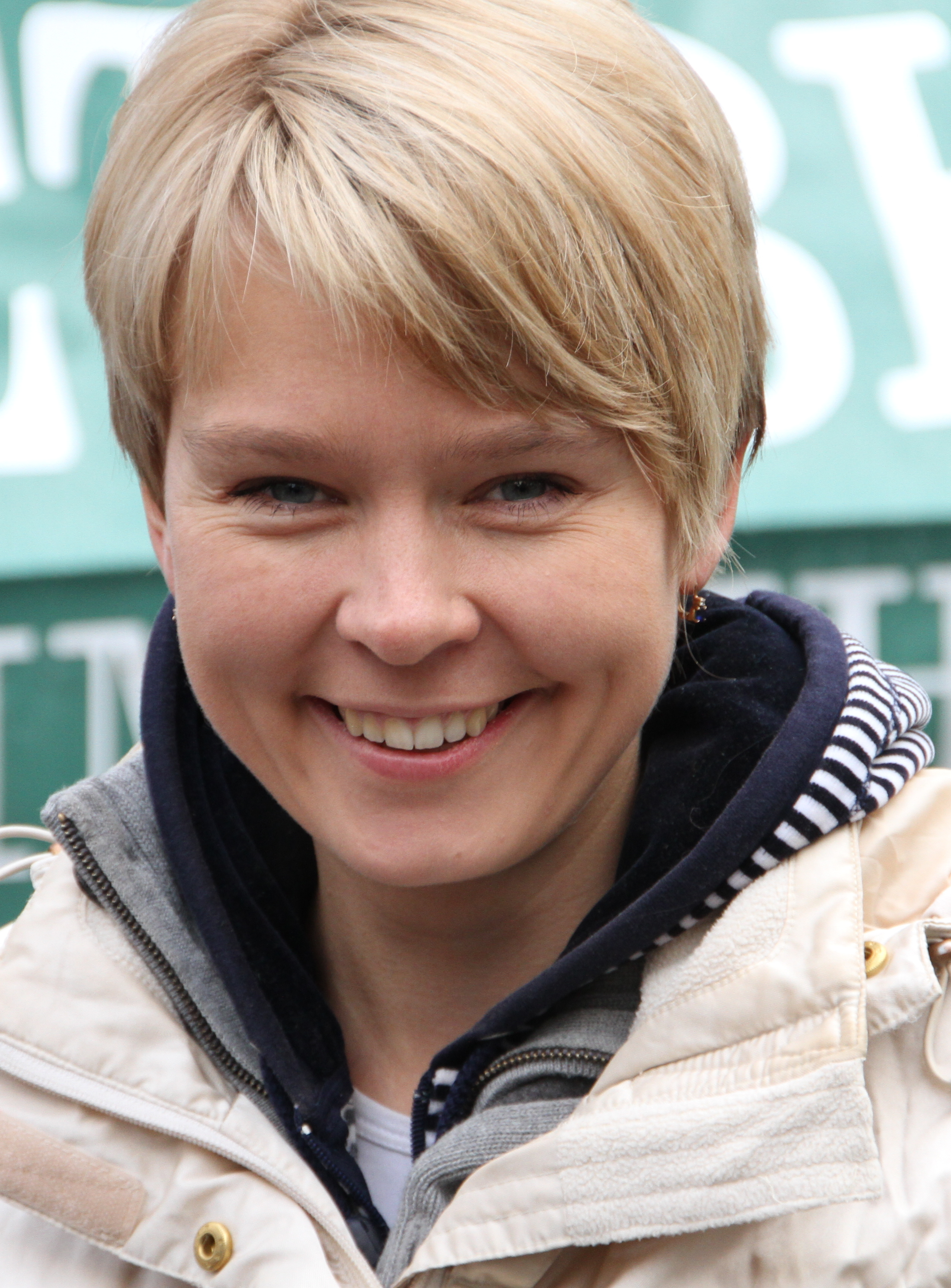

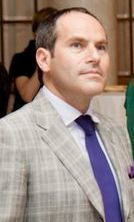

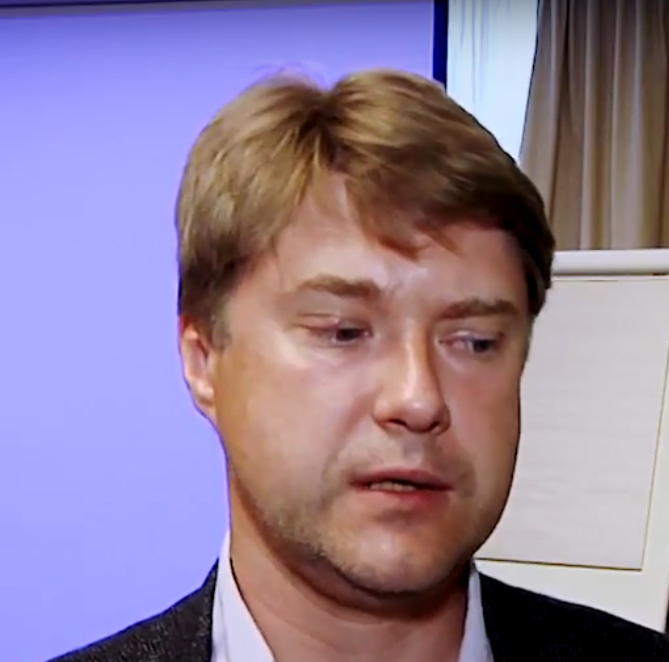
| Nominee | Alexei Navalny | Dmitry Bykov | Garry Kasparov |
| Party | ACF | League of Voters | OGF |
| Popular vote | 43,723 | 38,520 | 33,849 |
| Percentage | 53.76% | 47.37% | 41.62% |
| Nominee | Ksenia Sobchak | Ilya Yashin | Mikhail Gelfand |
| Party | Independent | RPR-PARNAS | Independent |
| Popular vote | 32,529 | 32,529 | 32,260 |
| Percentage | 40.00% | 39.94% | 39.67% |
| Nominee | Yevgeniya Chirikova | Mikhail Shats | Vladimir Ashurkov |
| Party | Independent | Independent | People's Alliance OC |
| Popular vote | 32,221 | 30,580 | 28,754 |
| Percentage | 39.62% | 37.60% | 35.36% |

2012 Russian Opposition Coordination Council election (Left-wing Forces list)
- 20–22 October 2012
- Registered: 170,012 (97,727 verified)
- Turnout: 40.38%
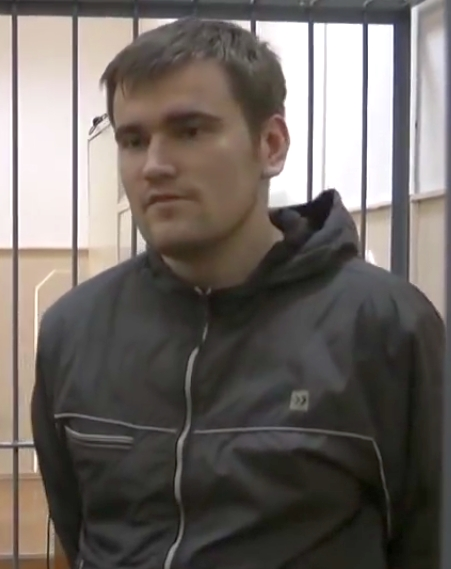
| Nominee | Alexey Gaskarov | Yekaterina Aitova | Alexander Nikolayev |
| Party | Independent | CPRF | Independent |
| Popular vote | 22,935 | 22,921 | 14,632 |
| Percentage | 33.41% | 33.39% | 21.32% |
| Nominee | Akim Palchayev | Leonid Razvozzhayev |
| Party | Left Front | Left Front |
| Popular vote | 13,720 | 12,760 |
| Percentage | 19.99% | 18.59% |

2012 Russian Opposition Coordination Council election (Liberal Forces list)
- 20–22 October 2012
- Registered: 170,012 (97,727 verified)
- Turnout: 41.26%
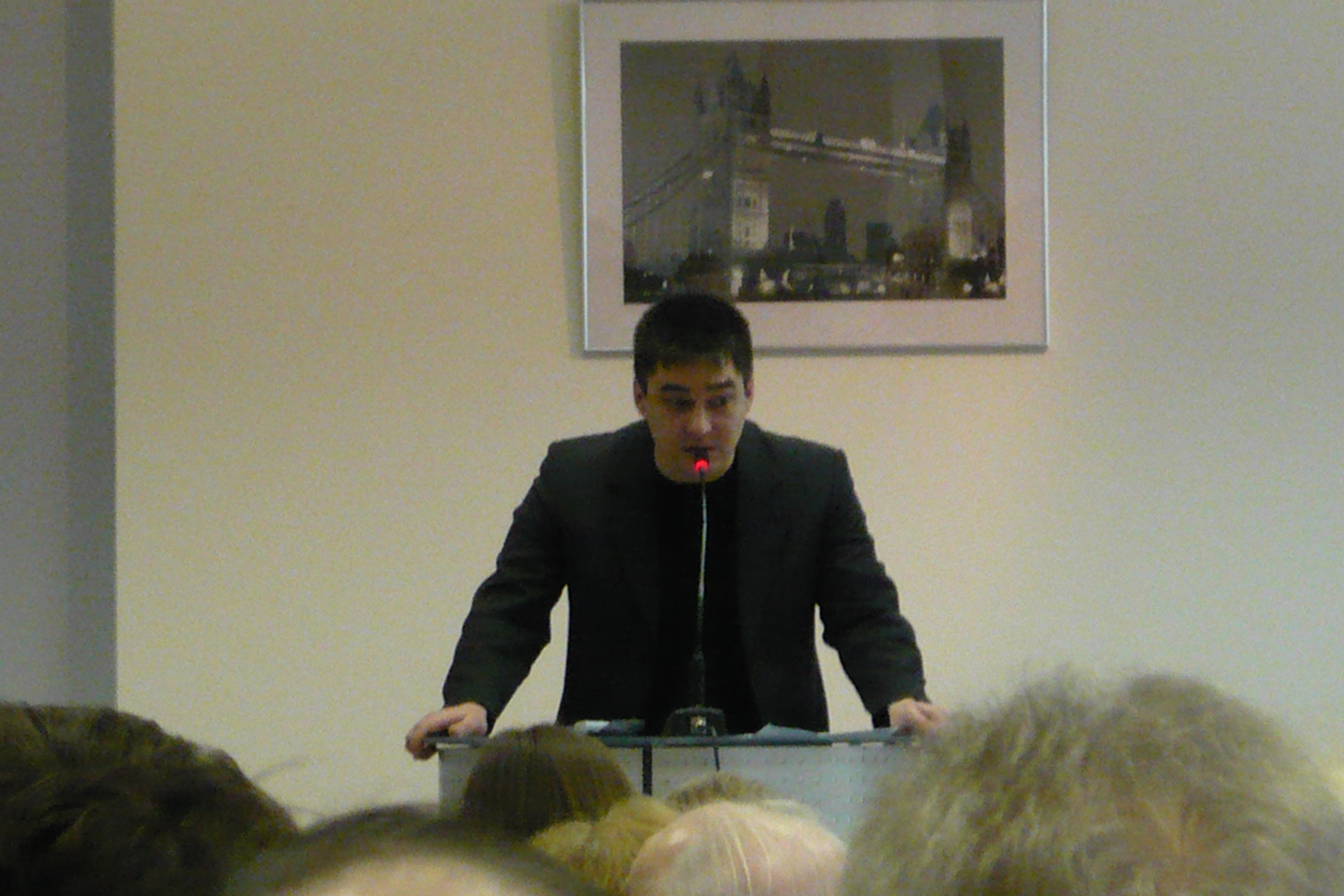

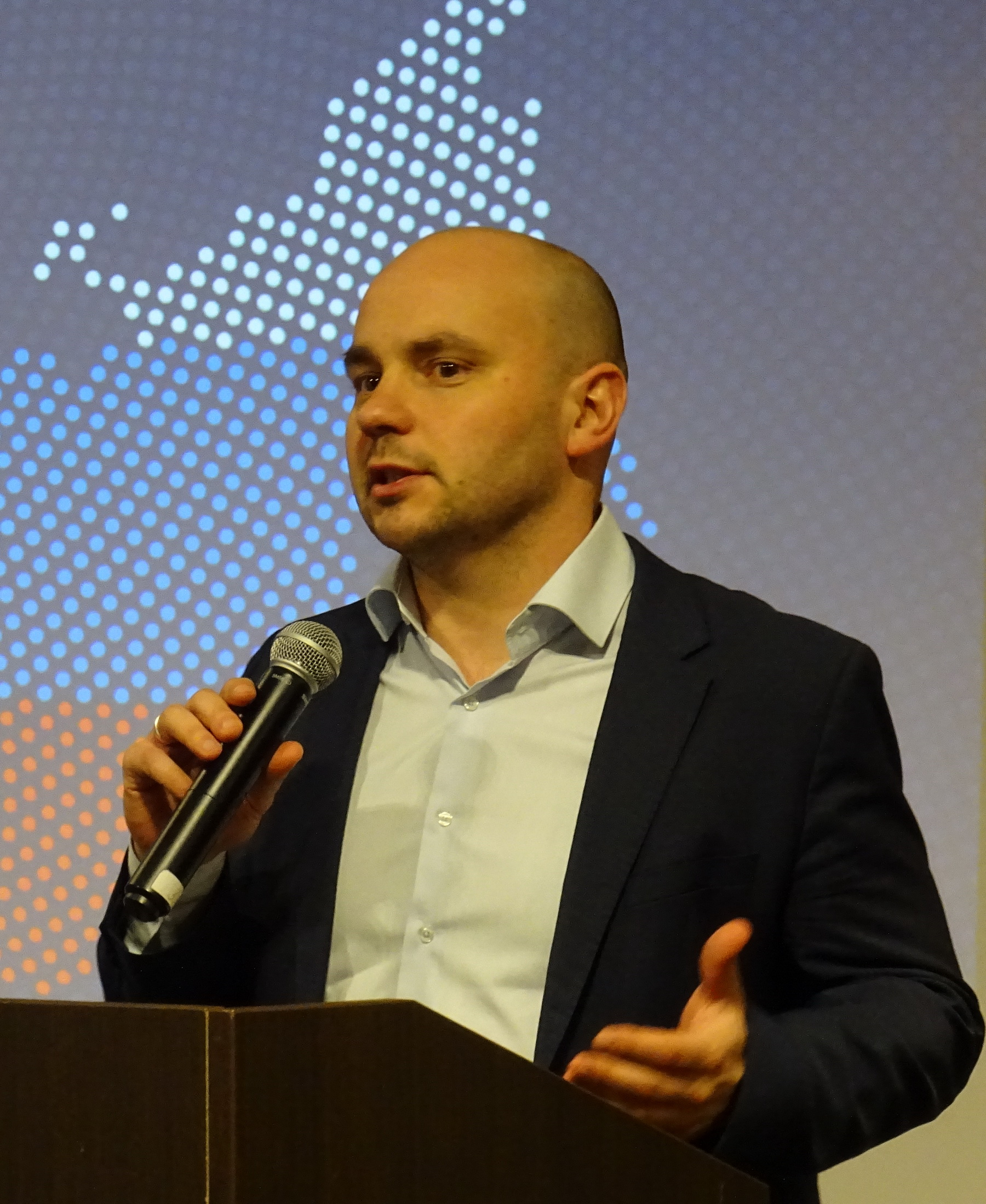
| Nominee | Sergey Davidis | Andrey Pivovarov | Anton Dolgikh |
| Party | 5th of December Party OC | RPR-PARNAS | RPR-PARNAS |
| Popular vote | 27,216 | 23,314 | 21,164 |
| Percentage | 38.80% | 33.24% | 30.17% |
| Nominee | Anna Karetnikova | Pyotr Tsarkov |
| Party | 5th of December Party OC | Solidarnost |
| Popular vote | 19,174 | 17,729 |
| Percentage | 27.34% | 25.28% |

2012 Russian Opposition Coordination Council election (Nationalist Forces list)
- 20–22 October 2012
- Registered: 170,012 (97,727 verified)
- Turnout: 39.89%
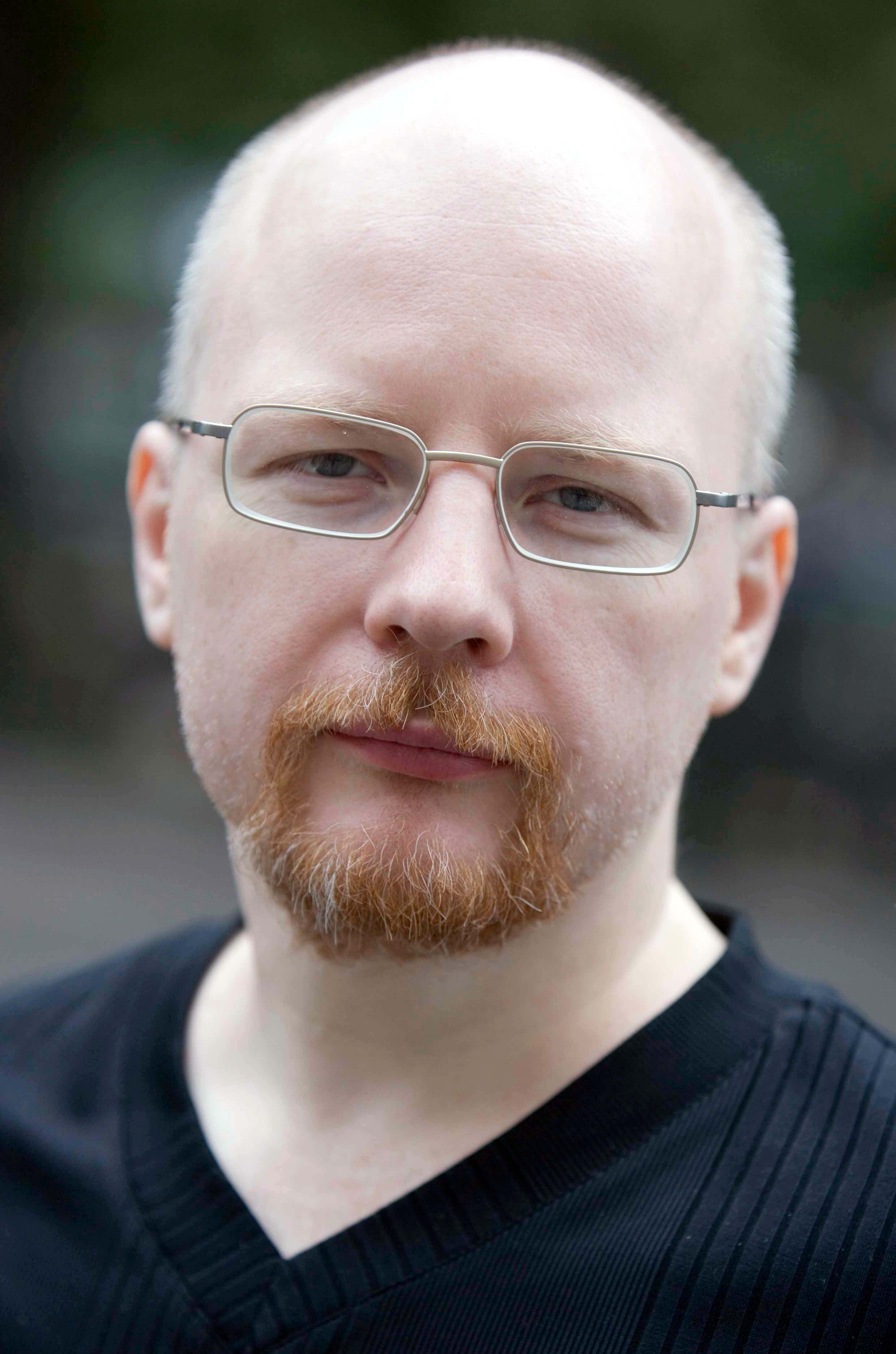
| Nominee | Daniil Konstantinov | Igor Artemov | Nikolay Bondarik |
| Party | Moscow Defense League | RONS | Russian march OC |
| Popular vote | 21,433 | 17,393 | 16,800 |
| Percentage | 31.61% | 25.65% | 24.77% |
| Nominee | Konstantin Krylov | Vladimir Thor |
| Party | NDP | NDP |
| Popular vote | 15,895 | 10,593 |
| Percentage | 23.44% | 15.62% |

Elections to the Russian Opposition Coordination Council were held on 20–22 October 2012. The Coordination Council was elected for one year; it was planned to hold new elections after this period. Registration of candidates and voters was carried out on the 'cvk2012.org' website. 81325 voters took part in the elections.

The elections to the Coordination Council were organized after repeated mass political demonstrations that began after the Russian legislative election on 4 December 2011, continued during the campaign for the election of the President of Russia and after the presidential elections held on 4 March 2012.

The creation of the Coordination Council was announced at the second March of Millions on June 12, 2012. The Coordination Council was dissolved in October 2013.

== Organization ==
A council consisting of 45 deputies was elected at the elections. At the same time, 30 of them were selected according to the general list, and another 15 - according to "ideological quotas". Each voter received 4 ballots at the polling station: for the general civil part of the list, for voting for representatives of the left-wing forces, for voting for representatives of liberals, for voting for representatives of nationalists. In the common ballot, the voter had the right to mark no more than 30 candidates, in the ideological ballots - no more than 5. In other words, the voter in total had 45 votes, which he distributed at his own discretion.

The elections were organized by the Central Election Committee. Leonid Volkov was elected chairman of the committee. Three members of the committee were delegated by the main ideological currents that make up the organizing committee of protest actions (the left-wing was represented by Alexander Ivanov, the nationalists were Elena Denezhkina, the liberals were Denis Yudin).The committee also included representatives of associations engaged in election observation: Grigory Melkonyants, deputy executive director of the Golos association, Vasily Vaysenberg, a member of the Sonar movement, and Yulia Drogova, an activist of the Citizen Observer project. In addition, experts in the field of Internet technologies Anton Nossik and Ilya Segalovich, founder of the voting website votepoller.com Valentin Preobrazhensky, board member of the Electronic Democracy Development Foundation Maxim Osovsky and board member of the Sonar observer movement Olga Feygina were included as experts in the committee.

== Candidates ==
A total of 209 candidates were registered. Registration was open until September 15 inclusive. Almost 300 applications for registration were received in total, with half of them received in the last two days of registration. Voters were asked to give answers to 25 questions in the "Political Compass" section and compare them with the answers of candidates for the Constitutional Court.

== Chronology ==
=== September 2012 ===
The organizers refused to register Maxim "Tesak" Martsinkevich.

=== October 2012 ===
On 16 October, Lyudmila Ulitskaya and Irina Yasina withdrew their candidacies, considering that there are “a significant number of active, motivated, knowledgeable young people whose work in the Coordinating Council will bring much more benefits.” At the same time, they noted that they fully support the idea of elections to the Coordination Council.

On 16 October, Sergey Mavrodi said in an interview about the mass registration of MMM members as voters of the Coordination Council and plans to “get the whole council”. According to Leonid Volkov, chairman of the Central Election Committee (TsVK), about 18,000 MMM participants registered that day. Volkov said that the TsVK would do everything to ensure that as few of them as possible could take part in the vote. Subsequently, when counting votes, the MMM participants who voted according to the “Mavrodi list” were excluded from the final count of votes.

On 17 October, it became known that a criminal case was opened at the request of 64 candidates against an “unidentified person” who “seized their money, causing material damage to each in the amount of 10 thousand rubles”. According to a report in the Snob magazine, the applicants are “adherents of Sergei Mavrodi from MMM who were denied registration as candidates, and the money has not yet reached them, because they still cannot provide account details for a refund.” According to Rosbalt, Mavrodi was engaged in activities to disrupt the elections to the opposition coordinating council in the interests of the Russian authorities.

On October 18, State Duma deputy Ilya Ponomarev withdrew his candidacy. He explained his move by the fact that his proposal to postpone the elections to December for greater participation of the regions in the voting was not supported, and also by the fact that little-known candidates were placed in an unequal position. At the same time, Ponomarev declared his support for the idea of elections and called on everyone to vote.

On 19 October, Oleg Lurie announced the withdrawal of his candidacy from the elections. He explained his decision by the involvement of the TsVK and, as a result, numerous falsifications in favor of certain candidates "confirming that there will be no elections to the Coordination Council as such. And there will only be an announcement of the "Navalny list" necessary for the organizers. According to Lurie, "all this has been done in order for a group of 30 people (Navalny and persons appointed by him) to make up 100% of the general civil list of the Coordination Council, and thereby be legalized as representatives of the all-Russian opposition masses.

The day before the end of the voting, Oleg Lurie published "Navalny's list" (a list of those whom the TsVK, according to Lurie, will put into the Opposition Coordination Council). Of the 30 candidates named by Lurie, 28 went to the Coordination Council.

== Dates ==
- 20 August 2012 - start of registration of candidates
- 27 August 2012 - beginning of the registration of the Regional Election Committees, which were engaged in the registration of voters in the regions, as well as the direct conduct of voting at the polling stations
- 10 September 2012 - beginning of the voter registration
- 15 September 2012 - end of registration of candidates and acceptance of applications for the creation of electronic polling stations
- 25 September 2012 - the last day of public testing of electronic platforms, which also included "trial" voting
- 1–6 October 2012 - the first round of candidate debates on TV Rain channel
- 15 October 2012 - end of acceptance of TsVK applications for the establishment of polling stations
- 18 October 2012 - end of voter registration (however, verification of already registered voters continued until the end of voting)
- 20–22 October 2012 - voting, until 22 October, 20.00 Moscow time (the voting end date was postponed by one day due to cyberattacks on voting sites)

== Debates ==
The pre-election debates of the candidates were held on the TV Rain channel from 1 to 19 October 2012.

The qualifying round of debates was from 1 to 6 October.

The semi-final was from 8 to 12 October.

The final round was from 15 to 19 October.

The winners of the debates were chosen by voters who registered and passed the identity verification procedure on the cvk2012.org website.

== Results ==
The results of the elections were announced an hour after the completion of the voting live on the TV Rain channel.

=== Common Civil list ===
| Candidate | Party | Votes | % |
|---|---|---|---|
| Alexei Navalny | Anti-Corruption Foundation | 43,723 | 2.80 |
| Dmitry Bykov | League of Voters | 38,520 | 2.47 |
| Garry Kasparov | United Civil Front | 33,849 | 2.17 |
| Ksenia Sobchak | Independent | 32,529 | 2.08 |
| Ilya Yashin | RPR–PARNAS/Solidarnost | 32,478 | 2.08 |
| Mikhail Gelfand | Independent | 32,260 | 2.07 |
| Yevgeniya Chirikova | Independent | 32,221 | 2.06 |
| Mikhail Shats | Independent | 30,580 | 1.96 |
| Vladimir Ashurkov | People's Alliance OC | 28,754 | 1.84 |
| Dmitry Gudkov | A Just Russia | 28,708 | 1.84 |
| Tatyana Lazareva | Independent | 28,707 | 1.84 |
| Sergey Parkhomenko | League of Voters | 27,434 | 1.76 |
| Filipp Dzyadko | Independent | 27,122 | 1.74 |
| Gennady Gudkov | A Just Russia | 26,973 | 1.73 |
| Lyubov Sobol | People's Alliance OC | 25,270 | 1.62 |
| Boris Nemtsov | RPR–PARNAS | 24,623 | 1.58 |
| Olga Romanova | Russia Behind Bars | 23,318 | 1.49 |
| Oleg Kashin | Independent | 22,496 | 1.44 |
| Andrey Illarionov | Independent | 22,445 | 1.44 |
| Sergei Udaltsov | Left Front/AKM | 21,424 | 1.37 |
| Vladimir Kara-Murza | RPR–PARNAS | 20,845 | 1.34 |
| Rustem Adagamov | Independent | 20,813 | 1.33 |
| Alexander Vinokurov | Independent | 20,382 | 1.31 |
| Maxim Katz | Yabloko-affiliated | 19,770 | 1.27 |
| Suren Gazaryan | Yabloko | 18,986 | 1.22 |
| Georgy Alburov | People's Alliance OC | 18,844 | 1.21 |
| Andrey Piontkovsky | Solidarnost | 17,662 | 1.13 |
| Vladimir Mirzoyev | Independent | 16,026 | 1.03 |
| Oleg Shein | A Just Russia | 15,744 | 1.01 |
| Vladislav Naganov | People's Alliance OC | 15,541 | 1.00 |
| Votes for the rest non-elected candidates | | 792,695 | 50.78 |
| Against all | | 159 | 0.01 |
| Total | | 1,560,901 | 100.00 |
| Total votes | | 81,325 | – |
| Registered voters/turnout | | 170,012 | 47.83 |
Source: Central Election Committee, Panorama Center

=== Left-wing Forces list ===
| Candidate | Party | Votes | % |
|---|---|---|---|
| Alexey Gaskarov | Independent anti-fascist | 22,935 | 12.46 |
| Yekaterina Aitova | Communist Party | 22,921 | 12.45 |
| Alexander Nikolayev | Independent communist | 14,632 | 7.95 |
| Akim Palchayev | Left Front/Svoboda OC | 13,720 | 7.45 |
| Leonid Razvozzhayev | Left Front | 12,760 | 6.93 |
| Votes for the rest non-elected candidates | | 85,271 | 46.31 |
| Against all | | 11,872 | 6.45 |
| Total | | 184,111 | 100.00 |
| Total votes | | 68,645 | – |
| Registered voters/turnout | | 170,012 | 40.38 |
Source: Central Election Committee, Panorama Center

=== Liberal Forces list ===
| Candidate | Party | Votes | % |
|---|---|---|---|
| Sergey Davidis | 5th of December Party OC/Solidarnost | 27,216 | 13.59 |
| Andrey Pivovarov | RPR–PARNAS | 23,314 | 11.64 |
| Anton Dolgikh | RPR–PARNAS | 21,164 | 10.57 |
| Anna Karetnikova | 5th of December Party OC/Solidarnost | 19,174 | 9.57 |
| Pyotr Tsarkov | Solidarnost | 17,729 | 8.85 |
| Votes for the rest non-elected candidates | | 83,500 | 41.69 |
| Against all | | 8,202 | 4.09 |
| Total | | 200,299 | 100.00 |
| Total votes | | 70,144 | – |
| Registered voters/turnout | | 170,012 | 41.26 |
Source: Central Election Committee, Panorama Center

=== Nationalist Forces list ===
| Candidate | Party | Votes | % |
|---|---|---|---|
| Daniil Konstantinov | Moscow Defense League | 21,433 | 14.66 |
| Igor Artemov | Russia Will Be Freed By Our Forces | 17,393 | 11.90 |
| Nikolay Bondarik | Russian march OC in Saint Petersburg | 16,800 | 11.49 |
| Konstantin Krylov | National Democratic Party | 15,895 | 10.87 |
| Vladimir Thor | National Democratic Party | 10,593 | 7.25 |
| Votes for the rest non-elected candidates | | 46,831 | 32.03 |
| Against all | | 17,246 | 11.80 |
| Total | | 146,191 | 100.00 |
| Total votes | | 67,814 | – |
| Registered voters/turnout | | 170,012 | 39.89 |
Source: Central Election Committee, Panorama Center

== Official publications ==
On 24 October 2012, Sergey Nesterovich, the technical auditor of the elections from the "curia of nationalists", published his report, in which, in particular, he noted: a much greater degree of technical soundness and openness”.

== Media coverage of elections ==
Articles about the elections were published in a number of major Russian media, including Lenta.ru, Gazeta.Ru, Echo of Moscow, TV Rain, Kommersant, Vedomosti, Novaya Gazeta.

State federal TV channels (Channel One, Russia-1, NTV) negatively assessed the nature and significance of the elected body. On 21 October 2012, the program “Sunday Vremya” aired a story by Anton Vernitsky about the elections to the opposition coordinating council, in which a conversation with Yevgeni Grishkovetz was shown, in which he criticized the opposition. On October 22, on his website, the writer stated that he had not given any interview to Channel One. His words were taken from a recording of a conversation with a correspondent of the Yekaterinburg Internet portal, and taken out of context.

=== The reaction of the country's leadership and politicians ===
Some members of the leadership of the United Russia party criticized the elections.

The co-chairman of the RPR-PARNAS party, Vladimir Ryzhkov did not put forward his candidacy for elections to the Coordination Council. He was generally neutral about the elections. The shortcomings of the elections to the Coordination Council, according to Ryzhkov: 1) there is no expansion of the social base; 2) it was not possible to maintain a broad coalition, which was announced in December 2011 (Yabloko, CPRF, Prokhorov's party, Kudrin's group, etc. do not participate); 3) elections are virtual, and therefore they do not give legitimacy.

According to the chairman of the Yabloko party, Sergey Mitrokhin, this project is very interesting, but Yabloko does not take part in it, since Yabloko has a different strategy. "Yabloko's strategy is to participate in the elections that exist today, sometimes only in name, in these very dishonest rigged elections and try to make them honest and transparent." In "virtual elections", as Mitrokhin called the elections to the Coordination Council, Yabloko does not participate. In addition, by decision of the congress, Yabloko cannot take part in structures where there are left-wing radicals and nationalists.

The Second Forum of the Left Forces adopted a resolution to boycott the elections to the Coordination Council. Sergei Udaltsov, Ilya Ponomarev and Ilya Budraitskis, who called on the left to participate in the elections, were in the minority.

After the results of the voting were announced, Ilya Ponomarev, State Duma deputy from A Just Russia, who did not get into the Coordination Council (on the eve of the elections, he wished to withdraw his candidacy), said that "the united opposition has ceased to exist". In his opinion, a "new political liberal party - Coordination Council" has appeared.

=== Political scientists' assessments ===
Political scientist Alexander Kynev commented on the result of the elections: "Too Moscow and party character of the Opposition Coordination Council is an obvious image problem. In fact, the elected OCC consists of approximately the same people who organized the Moscow protests of the last year".

Political scientist Dmitry Oreshkin noted that the European-oriented democrats received an absolute majority in the council. He emphasized the importance of the Coordination Council elections as one of the few options for a peaceful way out of the deadlock for Russia and the need for a new, separate legitimacy independent of Putin.
