= Russian Opposition Coordination Council =

Coordination Council of the Russian Opposition
- Abbreviation: CS, CSO, CSRO
- Leader: Alexei Navalny (de facto)
- Founded: 22 October 2012
- Dissolved: 19 October 2013
- Membership: 45
- Ideology: Liberalism (Russian); Anti-Putinism
- Slogan: "Russia without Putin!"

Website
- archive of website

The Coordination Council of the Russian opposition was a non-governmental political and civic body that existed in 2012–2013. Elections to the council were held on 20–22 October 2012. The Coordination Council of the first convocation was elected for one year, after which new elections were expected. However, they did not take place, and in October 2013, the council actually ceased to exist.

Elections to the coordination council (CS) were organized after numerous mass political protests by Russian citizens, which began after the elections to the State Duma of the VI convocation on 4 December 2011, continued during the campaign for the election of the President of Russia, and after the presidential elections held on 4 March 2012.

The creation of the Coordination Council was announced at the second "March of Millions" on 12 June 2012. The council was disbanded on 19 October 2013.

== Goals and objectives ==
After the second meeting of the Coordination Council, two approaches to defining the goals and objectives of the CS emerged. The first, led by Andrei Piontkovsky (radicals): it is necessary to continue demanding re-elections to the State Duma, the resignation of Vladimir Putin, and the implementation of deep political reforms. The second, led by Ksenia Sobchak (moderate): it is necessary to remove anti-Putin slogans, demand specific reforms (judicial, electoral, constitutional), thereby influencing the authorities.

As a result, at the second meeting of the CS, a working group was created, which included Vladimir Ashurkov, Andrei Piontkovsky, Sergei Parkhomenko, Alexei Gaskarov, Boris Nemtsov, Gennady Gudkov, and Konstantin Krylov. The group is supposed to come to a common solution by the third meeting, eliminating disagreements in defining the goals and objectives of the Council.

On 29 November 2012, Mikhail Khodorkovsky transmitted a message through his representative to all members of the Coordination Council, in which he expressed his opinion about the emerging "split" in the CS. In his address, Khodorkovsky notes that the slogans of the CS should be realistic and achievable, urging both sides to find a compromise.

External videos
- Video recording of one of the meetings of the Coordination Council of the Opposition

== Elections ==
The elections elected a Council consisting of 45 deputies. At the same time, 30 of them were elected from the general citizen list, and another 15 - from "ideological curiae". Each voter received 4 electronic ballots at the polling station: for the general citizen part of the list, for voting for representatives of left-wing forces, for voting for representatives of liberals, for voting for representatives of nationalists. In the "large" ballot, the voter had the right to put no more than 30 check marks, in the "small" ones – no more than 5. In other words, the voter had 45 votes, which he could distribute at his discretion.

The elections were organized by the Central Election Committee. The chairman of the committee was elected Leonid Volkov. Three members of the committee were delegated by the main ideological currents included in the organizing committee of the protest actions (Alexander Ivanov represents the left, Elena Denezhkina represents the nationalists, Denis Yud in represents the liberals). The committee also included representatives of associations involved in election monitoring: Deputy Executive Director of the Golos association Grigory Melkonyants, member of the Sonar movement Vasily Weisenberg, and activist of the "Citizen Observer" project Yulia Drogova. In addition, specialists in the field of Internet technologies Anton Nosik and Ilya Segalovich, founder of the votepoller.com voting website Valentin Preobrazhensky, member of the board of the Foundation for the Development of Electronic Democracy Maxim Osovsky, and member of the council of the Sonar movement Olga Feygina were included in the committee as experts.

== Composition ==
Composition of the Coordination Council in order of votes cast.

- General citizen list
  1. Alexei Navalny
  2. Dmitry Bykov
  3. Garry Kasparov
  4. Ksenia Sobchak
  5. Ilya Yashin
  6. Mikhail Gelfand
  7. Yevgenia Chirikova (left the CS)
  8. Mikhail Shats
  9. Vladimir Ashurkov
  10. Dmitry Gudkov (left the CS)
  11. Tatyana Lazareva
  12. Sergei Parkhomenko (left the CS)
  13. Philip Dyadko
  14. Gennady Gudkov (left the CS)
  15. Lyubov Sobol
  16. Boris Nemtsov
  17. Olga Romanova (left the CS)
  18. Oleg Kashin
  19. Andrei Illarionov
  20. Sergey Udaltsov
  21. Vladimir Kara-Murza
  22. Rustem Adagamov
  23. Alexander Vinokurov
  24. Maxim Katz (left the CS)
  25. Suren Gazaryan
  26. Georgy Alburov
  27. Andrei Piontkovsky (left the CS)
  28. Vladimir Mirzoev
  29. Oleg Shein (left the CS)
  30. Vladislav Naganov
- Left-wing forces
  1. Alexei Gaskarov
  2. Ekaterina Aitova (left the CS)
  3. Alexander Nikolaev
  4. Akhm Palchaev
  5. Leonid Razvozhaev
- Liberal forces
  1. Sergey Davidis
  2. Andrei Pivovarov
  3. Anton Dolgih
  4. Anna Karetnikova
  5. Petr Tsarykov (left the CS)
- Nationalist forces
  1. Daniil Konstantinov
  2. Igor Artyomov
  3. Nikolai Bondarik
  4. Konstantin Krylov
  5. Vladlen Kralin (Vladimir Tor)

== Meetings ==
No.	Date	Main agenda	CS members	Chairman	Video- recording	Steno- gram
1	27 October 2012	1. Political prisoners 2. Regulations; 3. Mass actions	37 out of 45	Alexei Navalny		
2	24 November 2012	1. Mass protests in December# Inclusion of opposition representatives in the composition of UIK; 2. CS regulations 3. Election of the responsible secretary 4. Budget committee and financing# CS website 5. "On the situation in the country and the tasks of the protest movement" 6. "On amendments to the Federal Law 'On Citizenship of the Russian Federation'"; 7. Report on the implementation of measures under the Plan of Priority Actions; 8. Final protocol and reports of the CEC	38 out of 45	Garry Kasparov		
3	16 December 2012	1. Discussion of the current socio-political situation and the strategy for the development of the CS; 2. Draft statement "On the situation in the country and the tasks of the protest movement" 3. Formation of CS working groups 4. Primaries for nominating a single candidate from the opposition in the elections for Governor of Moscow Oblast and head of Yekaterinburg; 5. Adoption of amendments to the CS regulations 6. Procedure for interaction with the Expert Council of the Opposition# Report and proposals of the budget committee. Expenses for the functioning of the CS; 7. Resolutions proposed by N. N. Bondarik	34 out of 45	Gennady Gudkov		
4	20 January 2013	1. Mass protests in March	33 out of 44	Vladimir Tor		
5	16 February 2013	1. Discussion of spring protest actions.; 2. Appeal to the participants of the events of 6 May and resolution on political prisoners and prisoners of conscience.; 3. Appeal on the expansion of the Magnitsky list.; 4. Programmatic statement on the goals and objectives of the CS	27 out of 43	Boris Nemtsov		
6	16 March 2013	1. Plan of protest actions for the spring of 2013 g.; 2. Creation of regional CS opposition offices.; 3. Proposals to working groups: "On the preparation of draft laws", "On the creation of basic propaganda materials", "On the voting system in the elections of the second CS convocation".; 4. Report of the budget committee.	27 out of 43	Alexei Gaskarov		
7	20 April 2013	1. Discussion of the action on 6 May 2013 g.; 2. Election of the Responsible Secretary of the CSO (Marat Davletbaev was elected)	30 out of 42	Mikhail Gelfand		
8	18 May 2013	1. Providing assistance to the family of Maxim Melkov.; 2. Support for the civic initiative to hold a mass protest action in Moscow on 12 June 2013 g.; 3. Discussion of the 6 May 2013 rally on Bolotnaya Square in Moscow.	27 out of 42	Sergey Davidis		
9	15 June 2013	1. Making a final decision on the issue of a single candidate from the opposition and supporting the candidacies of Alexei Navalny and Sergey Udaltsov in the elections for the mayor of Moscow; 2. The "Week of Action in Support of Alexei Gaskarov" campaign	26 out of 40	Ilya Konstantinov		
11	21 September 2013					

== Chronology ==
=== October 2012 ===
On 24 October, the first statement of part of the CS members "Against Repression and Torture" was published.

On 26 October, on behalf of part of the CS members (21 people), an appeal was published to hold a "From Lubyanka to Lefortovo. We are against repression and torture" action in Moscow on 27 October, starting at 3 pm. At this time, a chain of solitary pickets with placards dedicated to protesting against political repression in Russia will line up from the FSB building on Lubyanka Square to the headquarters of the Investigative Committee on Technical Lane.

On 27 October, the first meeting of the Coordination Council of the Opposition was held in Moscow from 12:00 for two and a half hours under the chairmanship of Alexei Navalny. The meeting was attended by 35 out of 45 elected Council members plus two via the Internet. The Coordination Council, already on its own behalf, and not on behalf of individual members, adopted a statement "Against Political Repression". CS members chose the "Democracy-2" online platform to inform Council members and conduct votes on various issues, and also appointed CS member Alexander Vinokurov and coordinator of the Committee of Civic Initiatives Dmitry Nekrasov as organizers of the next Council meeting. CS members supported the holding of a rally on 30 October in support of political prisoners, and also expressed their intention to participate in a "peaceful walk" against repression and torture on 27 October. This action began on Lubyanka almost immediately after the CS meeting.

=== November 2012 ===
On 24 November, the second meeting of the Coordination Council of the Opposition was held in Moscow from 12:00. Decisions were made on the regulations, the date of the "March of Freedom" on 15 December was named, the responsible secretary Dmitry Nekrasov was approved, and more.

=== December 2012 ===
On 14 December, the CS Statement on the 15 December March was published.

On 16 December, the third meeting of the CS was held. At it, a programmatic statement was adopted, based on the text "On the Goals and Objectives of the CSO", prepared by a group consisting of Vladimir Ashurkov, Alexey Gaskarov, Boris Nemtsov, and Sergei Parkhomenko. This programmatic statement was adopted by the CS with the minimum required number of votes (23 out of 45). An alternative programmatic statement "Our goal is a free democratic Russia" was proposed by a group consisting of A. Dolgih, A. Illarionov, I. Konstantinov, A. Piontkovsky. At the meeting, the formation of working groups on the main areas of activity of the CS was also initiated.

=== January 2013 ===
On 20 January, the fourth meeting of the CS was held. The participants of the meeting honored the memory of Alexander Dolmatov, a defendant in the "Bolotnaya" case, with a minute of silence. 16 decisions were made. In particular, about the organization of the "March against the Executioners" in the spring of 2013 g. An amendment on the need to eliminate the system of political investigation in Russia received a majority of 27 votes. The composition of nine working groups was approved. January was also marked by the opening of the PLURALIST website, dedicated to the activities of the CC.

=== February 2013 ===
On 11 February, the CC website was launched.

On 16 February, the fifth meeting of the CC was held. Sergey Udaltsov was supposed to chair, but shortly before the meeting, by a decision of the Basmanny Court, he was placed under house arrest. Boris Nemtsov chaired. Vladislav Naganov wrote about the documents adopted at this meeting of the CC in his LiveJournal.

At the end of February, CC member Rustem Adagamo announced that he had moved to Prague, where he would "engage in photojournalism, write in a blog". Adagamo's decision was criticized by some opposition members.

=== March 2013 ===
On 5 March, the CC adopted a statement on the construction of a road to Putin's winter residence and the resolution "On political prisoners and prisoners of conscience in Russia".

On 6 March, the voting on the creation of the Forum for a Free Russia was completed. A positive decision was made by a majority vote.

On 13 March, former State Duma deputy Gennady Gudkov and still a deputy, his son Dmitry Gudkov, were expelled from the "A Just Russia" party. The official reason was the participation of the Gudkovs in the CC.

On 16 March, the sixth meeting of the CC was held. The chairman was Alexei Gaskarov.

On 18 March, Dmitry Nekrasov, the responsible secretary of the Coordinating Council, asked to be relieved of his post. He explained his decision by his desire to focus on working at the Foundation for the Support of Free Media. In response, CC member Andrei Illarionov, in his blog on 30 March, proposed a procedure for electing the responsible secretary by CC members, the Expert Council of the Opposition and all registered CC voters.

=== April 2013 ===
On 4 April, Andrei Piontkovsky announced his withdrawal from the CC. The reason was disagreement with the absentee procedure for electing the responsible secretary of the CC and financial support for the transmission of Leonid Parfyonov.

On 20 April, the seventh meeting of the CC was held. The chairman was Mikhail Gelfand. Marat Davletbaev, who previously worked at Gazprom and Inter RAO UES, was elected as the Responsible Secretary of the CCO. His opponent was Natalya Chernysheva from the Expert Council.

On 29 April, an extraordinary meeting of the CC was held in connection with Gaskarov's arrest, and a statement was adopted.

=== May 2013 ===
On 6 May, a rally organized by the CCO under the slogan "For Freedom!", in defense of the political prisoners in the "Bolotnaya case", which gathered up to 30 thousand people, took place in Moscow. The CCO refused to participate in the march organized the day before by the ESO, accusing the ESO of spoiling, although the slogans of the actions on 5 and 6 May were the same, and the organizers of the 5 May March invited the participants of the march to come to the rally on 6 May.

The CCO, at its meeting, decided to hold the next mass action on 12 June, on "Russia Day". The main goal of the action will be to support the "Bolotnaya prisoners".

On 27 May, Maxim Katz announced his withdrawal from the CC in his blog. Maxim Katz named the ineffectiveness of the CC in its current composition as the reason for his withdrawal.

=== June 2013 ===
The action in the center of Moscow on 12 June was agreed upon. On 12 June, the "March Against Executioners" took place from Oktyabrskaya (metro station) to Bolotnaya Square, the number of participants was from 6,000 (MVD) to 30,000 (opposition).

On 15 June, the ninth meeting of the CC was held. The chairman was Ilya Konstantinov. It was decided to put the issue of supporting a single candidate from the opposition for the post of Mayor of Moscow to an online vote in "Democracy 2": Alexei Navalny or Sergey Udaltsov.

=== July 2013 ===
Journalist and opposition treasurer Olga Romanova left the CCO. "I'm tired of collecting money. I'll focus on the convicts", she said.

The meeting scheduled for 20 July did not take place due to lack of a quorum – out of 40 members of the CCO, only 14 came to the meeting.

=== August 2013 ===
In August, it was not possible to assemble the CCO meeting due to the preparation for the elections, in particular in Moscow and Yaroslavl.

=== September 2013 ===
State Duma deputy Dmitry Gudkov, ex-deputy Gennady Gudkov, journalist Sergei Parkhomenko, leader of the "Movement in Defense of the Khimki Forest" Evgenia Chirikova and organizer of mass protest rallies Pyotr Tsarykov announced that they were leaving the CCO and did not intend to run for it in the fall of 2013.

On 21 September, the 11th meeting of the CC was held. 23 people out of 39 members of the CC were present. Among the issues, the preparation of elections for the second CC was approved.

=== October 2013 ===
On 19 October 2013, the last meeting of the first convocation of the CC did not take place due to lack of a quorum. The date of the elections of the new composition of the CC was not set. On 19 October 2013, the CC ceased to exist, according to reports from ITAR-TASS.

== Regional councils ==
=== Zhukovsky (Moscow Oblast) ===
In October 2012, a regional election commission for the CC was organized in Zhukovsky. About 200 people voted at the precinct. Then they decided to create their own CC, and a week later, at the conference of the initiative group of residents, they appointed the Election Committee. The initial organizational work was undertaken by the Zhukovskie Vesti newspaper headed by editor Natalya Znamenskaya.

To register, candidates needed to collect 20 signatures of residents and answer questions from the "political compass", compiled on the problems of the city. From mid-January, volunteers began an agitation campaign – door-to-door visits, distribution of leaflets, etc. In February 2013, candidate debates were held at the Zhukovskie Vesti editorial office. The recordings were uploaded to YouTube.

Elections to the People's Council were held on the same electronic platform as the elections to the CC, but without electronic verification of voters. Therefore, the elections lasted a month, from 23 February to 24 March, so that members of the Election Committee could check the data of voters. As a result, 15 people were elected out of 27 candidates, 1783 voters participated, which is 3% of the residents of Zhukovsky.

=== Voronezh ===
Elections to the Public City Council were held in Voronezh, where 58 candidates competed for 21 seats.

== Use of CCO election technology in other countries ==
In June 2013, chess player and politician Garry Kasparov announced that he was leading the "We Choose" committee in support of fair elections in Iran. The committee, funded privately, is monitoring parallel elections in which 20 candidates who have been barred from participating in the election campaign are participating. "I have been working on this for the past few months together with Leonid Volkov. The improved Democracy-2 system is being used – this is a virtual electoral platform that was used to hold elections to the CCO. I am the informal organizer of the process, which began back in February. And Leonid Volkov is working on it directly with the Iranians [...] The idea is that if something works out, then this voting and people registration system will, of course, be used here in Russia. In my opinion, this is a very important event, because our technologies, know-how, are now being used in the fight against the Iranian regime".

== Assessments and opinions ==
=== Suggestions for the Coordinating Council ===
Even before the CC started working, many suggestions were made for it, both from the CC members themselves and from the voters. Here are some notable suggestions:

- Continue registering voters even after the CC is elected.
- Consider the 45 elected members of the CC as the executive committee – the upper house, and from those who did not make it to the CC, but who received at least 3%, form the lower house.
- From all registered voters, create the Forum for a Free Russia.

The collection and rating of questions to the CC members and the CEC were started in the Google Moderator system.

=== Reaction of politicians ===
The co-chairman of the RPR-PARNAS party Vladimir Ryzhkov did not nominate himself for the elections to the CC. He was generally neutral about the elections. According to Ryzhkov, the shortcomings of the elections to the CC are: 1) the social base is not expanding; 2) it was not possible to maintain the broad coalition that was declared in December 2011 (Yabloko, CPRF, Prokhorov's party, Kudrin's group, etc. do not participate); 3) the elections are virtual, and therefore they do not give legitimacy.

According to the chairman of the Yabloko party Sergey Mitrokhin, this project is very interesting, but Yabloko is not participating in it, since Yabloko has a different strategy. "Yabloko's strategy is to participate in the elections that exist today, sometimes only in name, in these very unfair, rigged elections, and to try to make them fair and transparent." Yabloko is not participating in "virtual elections", as Mitrokhin called the elections to the CC. In addition, by a decision of the congress, Yabloko cannot participate in structures where there are left-wing radicals and nationalists.

The Second Forum of Left Forces adopted a resolution on boycotting the elections to the CC. Sergey Udaltsov, Ilya Ponomarev and Ilya Budraitskis, who called on the left to participate in the elections, were in the minority.

One of the leaders of the "Solidarity" movement Vladimir Bukovsky considers the election of the CC to be a mistake of the opposition: "This is an absolutely pointless waste of time and effort. An organization of 45 people cannot work and make decisions ... Moreover, the CC has taken the path of broad representation of various political currents, and this will lead to even greater disagreements. In addition, the authorities will try to split it".

=== Assessments by political scientists ===
Political scientist Alexander Kynev commented on the results of theCC elections as follows: "The overly Moscow and clique-like nature of the Coordinating Council of the Opposition is a clear image problem. In fact, the elected CC consists of roughly the same people who organized Moscow's protest actions over the past year".

In December 2012, political scientist and member of the Coordinating Council Andrei Piontkovsky talked about the struggle going on within the CC:

The Coordinating Council plays the role of the country's proto-parliament. When the idea of its creation arose, the Council was supposed to become the headquarters of a peaceful anti-crime revolution. This is how I proposed it. And now, one half of its members is in favor of an operation to replace Putin with another guy, while the other half supports the idea of a peaceful anti-crime revolution. In this sense, the Coordination Council is a useful body, which, thanks to the political debates that are taking place there, opens the eyes of many people.

However, in April of the following year, Piontkovsky decided to leave the CCO: "I have little time and a lot of unfinished work. I can no longer afford to spend the resource granted to me on convincing smart adults of the obvious". Subsequently, he switched to more active work in the Expert Council of the Opposition (ESO), and at the same time acted as a link between the ESO and the CCO, trying to coordinate their positions, for example, on the issue of holding actions on 5 and 6 May 2013.

In July 2013, Piontkovsky condemned the CCO for supporting only Navalny in the mayoral elections in Moscow:

Unfortunately, the bohemian-glamorous core of the CCO, which sets the tone in it today, having justly provided moral and political support to Alexei Navalny, defiantly refused the same support to another member of the CC – prisoner of the regime Sergey Udaltsov, despite his direct request. Having so shamelessly revealed their class and ideological prejudices, these people, in my opinion, forever deprived themselves of the moral right to coordinate the joint struggle of various currents of the protest movement.

According to political scientist Igor Semyonov, liberalism prevailed in the CCO, which also prevails in protest Moscow in general. The existing system of CC members suits them – they consider it the lesser evil than unpredictable popular rule. Therefore, the CCO has neither a program nor tools to replace the existing regime. CC members view the people as "a herd of sheep" and are unable to raise them to revolution. The people respond to the liberals with mutual disdain and choose rather "corrupt power in uniform". But in May 2013, ESI appeared as an alternative. "This is still a very small, but courageous head of a huge sleeping protest brontosaurus". Further, according to Igor Semyonov, the CCO will decrease as the protest merges, while the ESO, which calls for the renewal of the protest organization, will increase. The task of opposition Moscow is to find the strength to lead the revolution of self-government from below, while losing their privileges, otherwise nationalist forces will inevitably ride the wave of popular self-government.

Sociologist Igor Eidman noted in his blog in October 2013 that "in reality, the CC was apparently created for two purposes: to legitimize Navalny as the leader of the opposition, and to create a certain recognized pool of potential negotiators with the authorities." According to Eidman, the first task has been solved, while the second turned out to be unattainable due to the government's intransigence. Thus, believes Eidman, the CC is no longer needed.

=== Public opinion polls ===
From 15 to 18 March 2013, the Levada Center conducted an all-Russian survey on behalf of Gazeta.ru regarding the attitude of Russian residents towards the Coordination Council. 1601 people living in 130 settlements were interviewed. As a result, it turned out that 27% of the respondents had heard about the CC. Only 1% of citizens closely monitor the work of the CC.

The Levada Center also found out the opinion of citizens on who the CC is acting in the interests of. The opinions of respondents who had heard something about the CC were distributed as follows:

- in the interests of the people who head the Coordinating Council – 23%
- in the interests of foreign sponsors – 15%
- in the interests of the opposition – 11%.
- in the interests of the middle class – 8%
- in the interests of the Moscow intelligentsia – 8%
- in the interests of all citizens of Russia – 6%.

30% of those who had heard something about the CCO could not answer the question of whose interests the oppositionists are protecting.

=== Petition to close the CC ===
On 24 December 2012, a petition with a demand to close the Coordinating Council of the Russian Opposition was posted on the whitehouse.gov website as part of the project of appeals from the public to the administration of the US President We the People, since this organization "spends too much money from American taxpayers without positive results" ("Coordinating Council of Opposition spend too many U.S. taxpayers' money without positive effect"). This petition appeared in response to previously published petitions demanding that deputies of the State Duma who voted for the "anti-orphan law" and President Vladimir Putin be included in the "Magnitsky list" if he signs this law. The first of these petitions gathered over 54 thousand votes. The initiator of the petition to close the CC was lawyer and opposition figure Mark Feygin, but he denied his involvement in it. CCO member, journalist Sergei Parkhomenko called the petition to close the CC a joke, and on 26 December, it was removed from the website.

=== The fate of the CC members ===
Two members of the CC died – Boris Nemtsov (murdered) and Alexei Navalny (died in prison), while three were imprisoned – Vladimir Kara-Murza, Ilya Yashin and Sergey Udaltsov.

== See also ==
- Russian opposition
- 2011–13 Russian protests
