= ASTU =

ASTU may refer to:

- Adama Science and Technology University
- Assam Science and Technology University
- Astrakhan State Technical University
