= Daniil Konstantinov =

Russian leader of fair election movement

- Born: Daniil Ilyich Konstantinov; February 5, 1984 (age 42); Leningrad, RSFSR, Soviet Union
- Website: konstantinovdaniil.ru

Daniil Ilyich Konstantinov (Russian: Даниил Ильич Константинов) (born February 5, 1984) is a Russian opposition politician, lawyer, and human rights activist who led the Moscow Defense League movement. He is a member of the organizing committee For Fair Elections. Previously, he was an activist in The People movement, the leader of Change, and a member of the A Just Russia party. Since 2012, he has been a member of the Russian Opposition Coordination Council.

== Early and education ==
Konstantinov was born in Leningrad to the family of Russian politician Ilya Konstantinov. In 1992, his family moved to Moscow. He graduated from Russian State Social University with a law degree and later taught there after completing graduate studies.

== Political career ==
Konstantinov began participating in politics while still a student. In 2004, he ran for election to the Moscow City Duma. In 2005, he organized a steering committee to establish a socio-political party called Change and participated in the State Duma elections as an independent politician.

From 2006 to 2007, he served as chief editor of Country and Society, was a correspondent for Regnum.ru, contributed to the site Open Letter to the Government, and was the organizer and director of the Support Center of Non-Profit Organizations. In early 2007, he joined forces with other opposition groups under the "Popular Front." Later that year, he joined the movement The People, working alongside Alexei Navalny and Zakhar Prilepin, among others. He also worked on the draft law "On Progressive Taxation" and, from November 2007 to 2008, was a member of the party A Just Russia, heading its youth wing in the North-Eastern Administrative Okrug.

On April 22, 2008, he held a conference titled "The Future of Russia: Prospects for Development" at the Higher School of Economics. The conference was dedicated to discussing the results of the presidential elections in Russia and their potential socio-economic and political consequences.

In 2011, he represented Eduard Limonov in court concerning the registration of the party The Other Russia. In May 2011, in collaboration with some young political activists, he announced the foundation of the organizing committee National Salvation Front.

== Prosecution ==
On March 22, 2012, Konstantinov was arrested in his apartment and charged with domestic murder. He claims that members of the General Directorate for Combating Extremism (Center "E") initiated the case after he refused to cooperate. Documents from the investigation dated March 5, 2012, and April 4, 2012, revealed that the operational support for the criminal investigation against Konstantinov was provided by the General Directorate for Combating Extremism and the management of the Federal Security Service.

After the protest rally "For Fair Elections!" on December 5, 2012, Konstantinov was arrested and imprisoned. An officer from Center "E", who remained anonymous, attempted to converse with Konstantinov. The officer suggested that Daniil would engage in informative activities. When Konstantinov declined, the officer threatened him, saying he would "roll you up to the asphalt" and "Where I am — there are corpses and long terms."

Yulia Latynina stated that Konstantinov's case is an extremely rare instance of political persecution on trumped-up criminal charges in modern Russia. He is the only national whom the Memorial Centre considers a political prisoner.

== Public campaign ==
Duma deputies spoke in support of Konstantinov, including Dmitry Gudkov, Ilya Ponomarev, Alexander Khinshtein, and D. Gorovtsa. Opposition leaders Sergei Udaltsov, Sergey Baburin, Vladimir Milov, and Boris Nemtsov also submitted parliamentary inquiries.

The opposition leaders sent a collective letter to Yuri Chaika, requesting him to "take control of the investigation into Daniil Ilyich Konstantinov's case and ensure an objective and impartial review of all the circumstances of this case". The letter was signed by Sergey Baburin, Dmitry Gudkov, Garry Kasparov, Konstantin Krylov, Eduard Limonov, Vladimir Milov, Boris Nemtsov, Valery Solovei, Vladimir Tor, Yegor Kholmogorov, Nadezhda Shalimova, and Rostislav Antonov.

Daniil Konstantinov is recognized as a political prisoner by the human rights organization Memorial.

== Torture ==
Before the verdict was read, Konstantinov was tortured, threatened, forced to strip naked, and shocked with a stun gun. After a long session, Konstantinov fainted. When he woke up, he was allowed to get dressed and placed in a glass cell. He began to demand his release and an end to the intimidation tactics being used against him. This angered his jailers, who then grabbed his hands and painfully stretched them using handcuffs. He remained in this position for about two hours before the verdict and another four hours afterward.

Shkred, Konstantinov's lawyer, stated, "After, Daniil was taken to detention center, where his injuries were recorded. I have not read the medical report, but I saw on his body handcuff marks and bruises on his right arm, and redness on his belly from stun gun use. We think that it was an inappropriate show of physical force, and request an immediate response from the Moscow City Court."

== Verdict ==
In late 2013, Konstantinov was found not guilty of murder; however, he was not fully acquitted, and the case was referred back to the prosecution.

== Putin's remarks on Konstantinov's case ==
During the press conference, Putin answered questions from Znak.com correspondent Ekaterina Vinokurova, who asked about the head of state’s opinion on the repressive nature of the Russian judicial system.

— Now acquittals less 1% — less than under Stalin, — Catherine recalled. — Responding to a similar question, you said that, then, investigation works well. But it is not. Enough to look at the processes on the same Bolotnaya case or cases of Aksana Panova, Daniil Konstantinov.

— I agree with you that we need to seek purity of court decisions, verdicts, improve the quality of the preliminary investigation, judicial investigation, — said Putin. — All of this should be done. But I want to assure you that in fact it is a problem not only in our country. Everywhere there is a miscarriage of justice, any negligence in the investigation and interrogation apparatus and the judiciary. But we must work on this together, including through the media. I also say this quite seriously, without irony any jokes. We are often faced with dishonesty and some substandard work. It happens. And, of course, we have to react to this and try to do it. But I want to pay your attention to the fact that decisions on amnesty just due to the fact to close this topic, flip it. And do everything possible in moving forward, and together with the representatives of civil society, and the law enforcement system, and with the state and other authorities destinations. Okay?

== In popular culture ==
- On April 7, 2014, the theater “Torch” premiered Alexei Dykhovichnyi’s “Falsification: Daniil Konstantinov Process,” or simply “Falsification.” The premiere was held at the Center for Sakharov. The premiere was held at the Center for Sakharov.

Comment by Vladimir Ryzhkov:

Another 100% falsified case.

Quote by Alexei Dykhovichnyi:

If we are really short, this is a film about the injustice towards the individual. This injustice is shown in the film and clearly documented . Today, this level of injustice is unique even for our justice system, but whether there will be . As is well known, only scary the first time only. If the Russian Themis and make this step towards condemnation of an innocent, tomorrow anyone can be arrested and jailed on charges of first that fell, and no evidence of innocence will not help him . As they say all the experts with whom I could talk to, yet this does not happen, but it can become Konstantinova Rubikon.

- On August 26, 2013, at 2:00 PM, artist Alec Petuk held a quiet campaign titled "The Art of Contemplation of Nature" in support of political prisoner Daniil Konstantinov during his court hearing.
