= Suren Gazaryan =

Russian zoologist

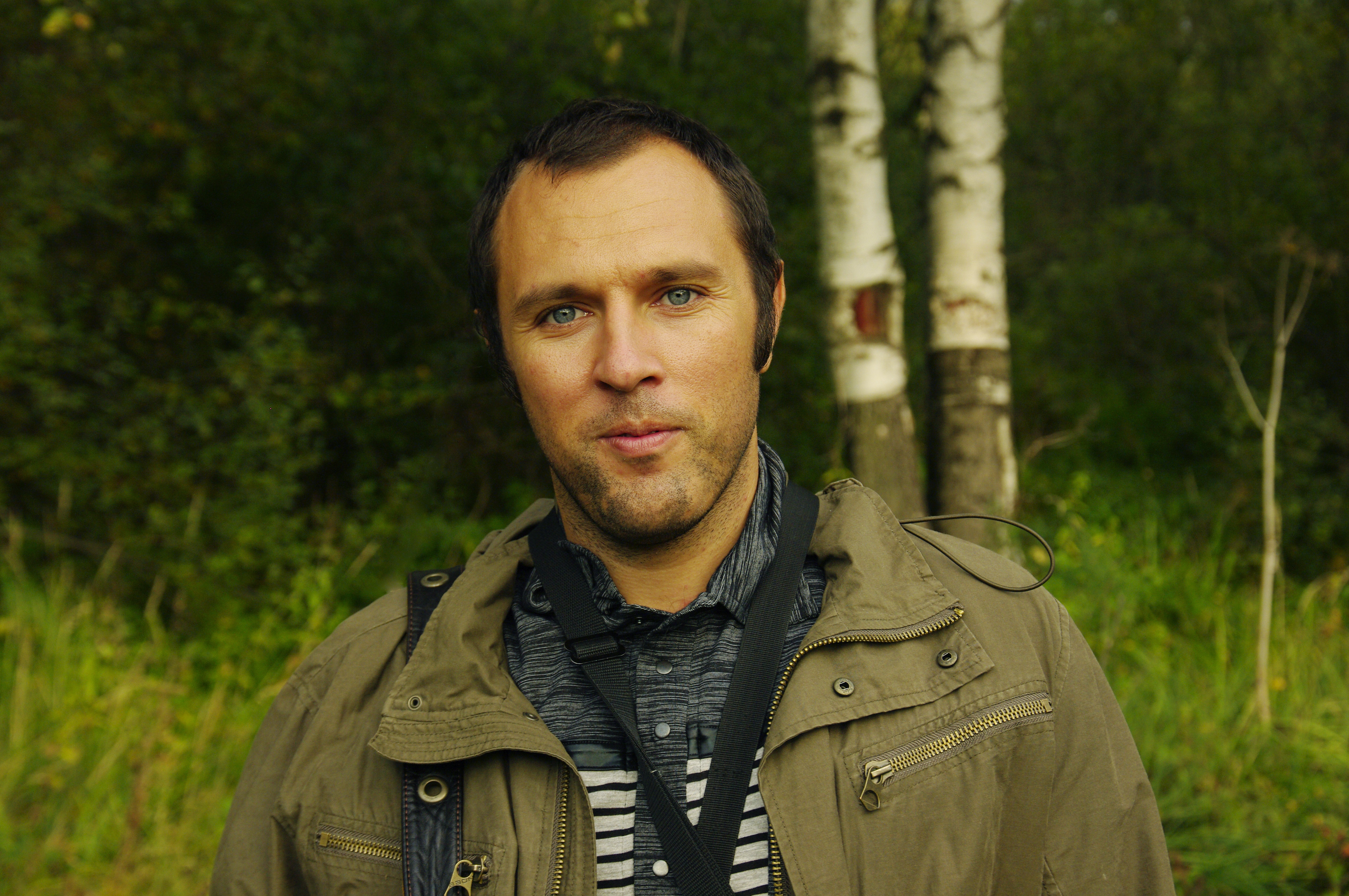
- Born: 8 July 1974 (age 50); Krasnodar, USSR
- Citizenship: Russia
- Education: Kuban State University
- Occupation(s): Chiropterologist, environmentalist, politician, zoologist
- Awards: Goldman Environmental Prize (2014)

Suren Gazaryan (born Suren Vladimirovich Gazaryan, Russian: Сурен Владимирович Газарян) (born 8 July 1974) is a Russian zoologist, dissident, public figure, and former member of The Environmental Watch on North Caucasus. He is a member of the Russian Opposition Coordination Council. He was awarded a Goldman Environmental Prize in 2014.

== Life ==
Gazaryan was born on 8 July 1974 in Krasnodar. In 1996, he graduated from Kuban State University, and in 2001 he completed postgraduate studies at the Russian Academy of Sciences. In 2001, he was also elected chairman of the commission for the protection of caves of the Russian Union of Cavers.

In 2014, he was granted asylum in Estonia.
