= Grigory Melkonyants =

Russian human rights activist (born 1981)

- Григорий Мельконьянц
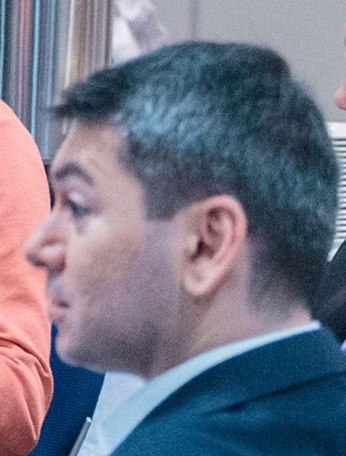
- Melkonyants in 2018
- Born: January 23, 1981 (age 45); Astrakhan, Astrakhan Oblast, USSR
- Education: Astrakhan State Technical University; Higher School of Economics
- Occupations: Human rights activist, lawyer
- Known for: Co-chair of the movement for voters' rights Golos
- Website: golosinfo.org

Grigory Arkadyevich Melkonyants (Russian: Григорий Аркадьевич Мельконьянц; born 23 January 1981, Astrakhan, USSR) is a Russian human rights activist, lawyer, and public figure. He is the co-chair of the movement for voters' rights "Golos". He is a member of the Scientific-Expert Council under the Central Election Commission of Russia, the Human Rights Council of Russia, and the Organizing Committee of the All-Russian Civil Forum.

In 2024, Amnesty International declared Melkonyants a prisoner of conscience.

== Biography ==
=== Early life and education ===
His father, Arkady Amayakovich Melkonyants (1951–1997), was an ethnic Armenian and founder of the charity foundation "Ecology of the Soul", the first charitable organization in Astrakhan Oblast. He was posthumously included in the Astrakhan Book of Remembrance in 2005.

Melkonyants graduated in 2003 with a law degree from Astrakhan State Technical University. In 2009, he completed a continuing education program in social project management at the Higher School of Economics.

== Human Rights and Civil Activity ==
From 2003 to 2012, he was deputy executive director of the Golos association for voter rights. He helped implement parallel vote tabulation in the 2003 parliamentary elections involving 4,500 independent observers.

Since 2009, he has served on the committee awarding the "Defender of Free Elections" medal.

In 2011, he co-founded the hotline and the "Election Violation Map", collecting and publicizing election law violations.

Since 2013, he has been co-chair of Golos and a member of the All-Russian Civil Forum, where he coordinated the "Elections and Referenda" panel in 2014, 2015, and 2016.

He participated in the creation of the "Russian Candidate Encyclopedia" in 2016 and has been part of the Moscow Public Election Monitoring Headquarters since that year.

In 2017, he co-founded the expert forum "Laws on Elections — for the Voter" and joined the permanent advisory group under the Russian Human Rights Commissioner.

== Public election participation ==
In 2012, he was a member of the Central Electoral Committee for the Coordination Council of the Russian Opposition.

In 2014, he ran for the Public Chamber of Russia under the "Public Oversight Development" category. Despite initially leading the vote, he fell to fifth place amid alleged vote manipulation.

== Criminal case ==
On August 17, 2023, Melkonyants was arrested and placed in custody by Moscow's Basmanny District Court. He was charged with organizing activities of an "undesirable organization" — the European Network of Election Monitoring Organizations (ENEMO).

Lawyer Mikhail Biryukov cited rulings from courts in Kirov and Barnaul in 2022 and 2023 confirming no connection between Golos and ENEMO.

Melkonyants denied all charges in court.

He remains in detention. Amnesty International has demanded his release

== Awards ==
- 2011: Laureate of Big City magazine's "Heroes of the Year" award
- 2012: Moscow Helsinki Group Prize for human rights in elections
- 2018: Moscow Helsinki Group Prize for civic activism
