= Ilya Konstantinov (politician) =

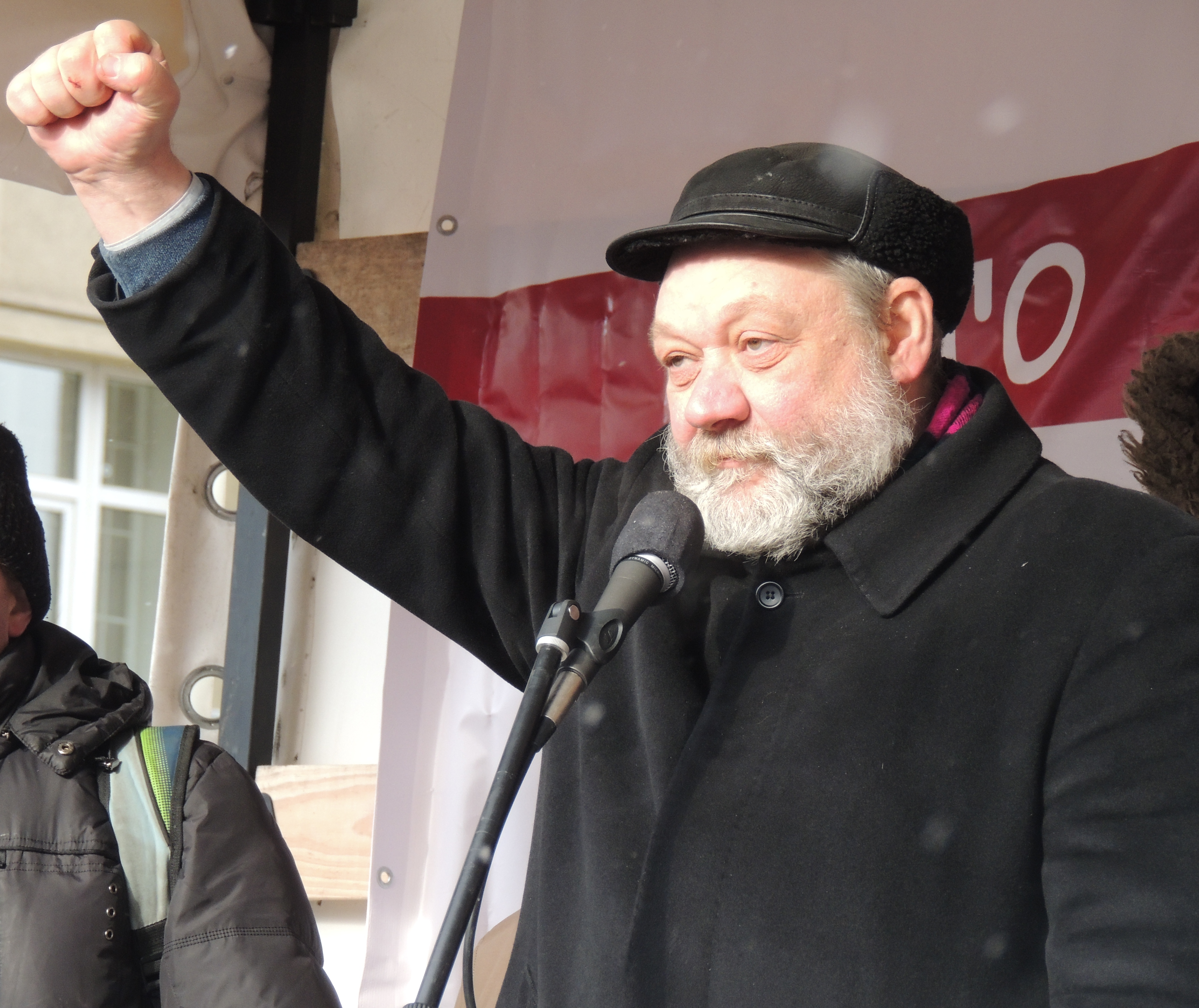
- Ilya Konstantinov in 2013
- Born: Ilya Vladislavovich Konstantinov; December 28, 1956 (age 69); Leningrad, USSR
- Occupations: economist, politician, public figure

Ilya Vladislavovich Konstantinov (Russian: Илья́ Владисла́вович Константи́нов; born December 28, 1956, Leningrad) is a Russian statesman, political and public figure; People's Deputy of the RSFSR, member of the Council of the Republic of the Supreme Soviet of Russia (1990-1993); Director of the Department of the Institute for the Development of Civil Society and Local Self-Government (until January 2009).

In 1993, he sharply opposed the strengthening of the presidential power.

He is the father of the nationalist politician Daniil Konstantinov.
