= Mikhail Shats =

Russian actor (born 1965)

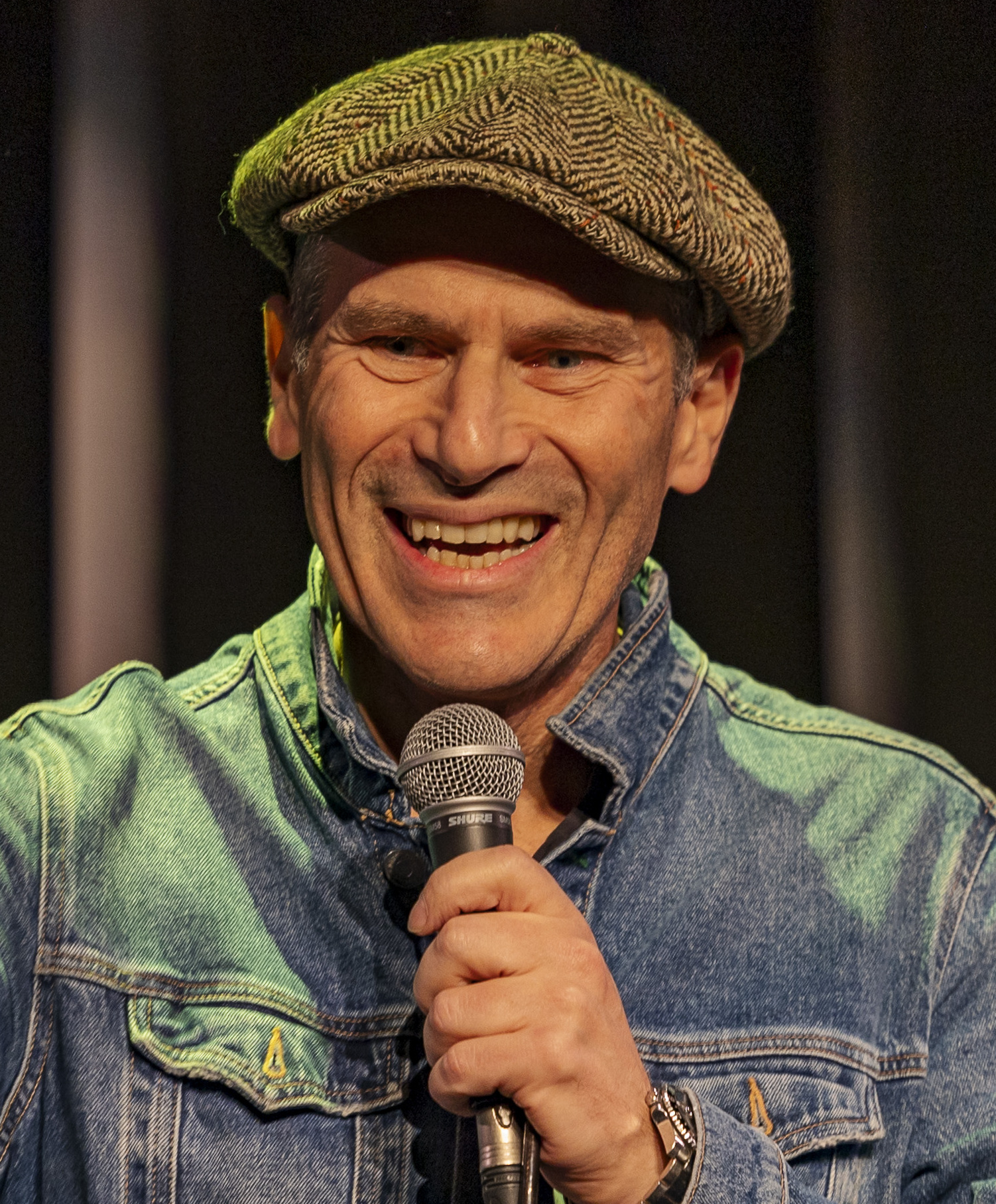
- Mikhail Shats in 2024
- Born: 7 June 1965 (age 61); Leningrad, USSR
- Citizenship: Russia; Israel
- Education: First Pavlov State Medical University of St. Petersburg
- Occupations: TV host, actor, stand-up comedian, podcaster, YouTuber
- Years active: 1995-present
- Spouse: Tatyana Lazareva (divorced)

Mikhail Grigoryevich Shats (born 7 June 1965) is a Russian-Israeli TV host, actor, stand-up comedian, YouTuber, and opposition activist. He is also known as a former member of the Coordinating Council of the Russian Opposition.

== Biography ==
Mikhail Shats was born on 7 June 1965 in Leningrad. Upon graduating from School No. 185 in 1982, he entered the medical faculty of the First Leningrad Medical Institute. He graduated with a specialisation in anesthesiology and resuscitology and later completed his residency at the same institute.

From 1987 to 1994, Shats competed on the KVN TV show as a member of the First Medical Institute and UNECON teams. He also played for the Russian team at the CIS KVN competition.

From 1995 to 2001, he worked at the TV-6 Moscow channel. In 1996, with Tatiana Lazareva, Pavel Kabanov, Sergei Belogolovtsev, and Andrei Bocharov, he launched the comedy program OSP Studio. The program was in the air up to 2004.

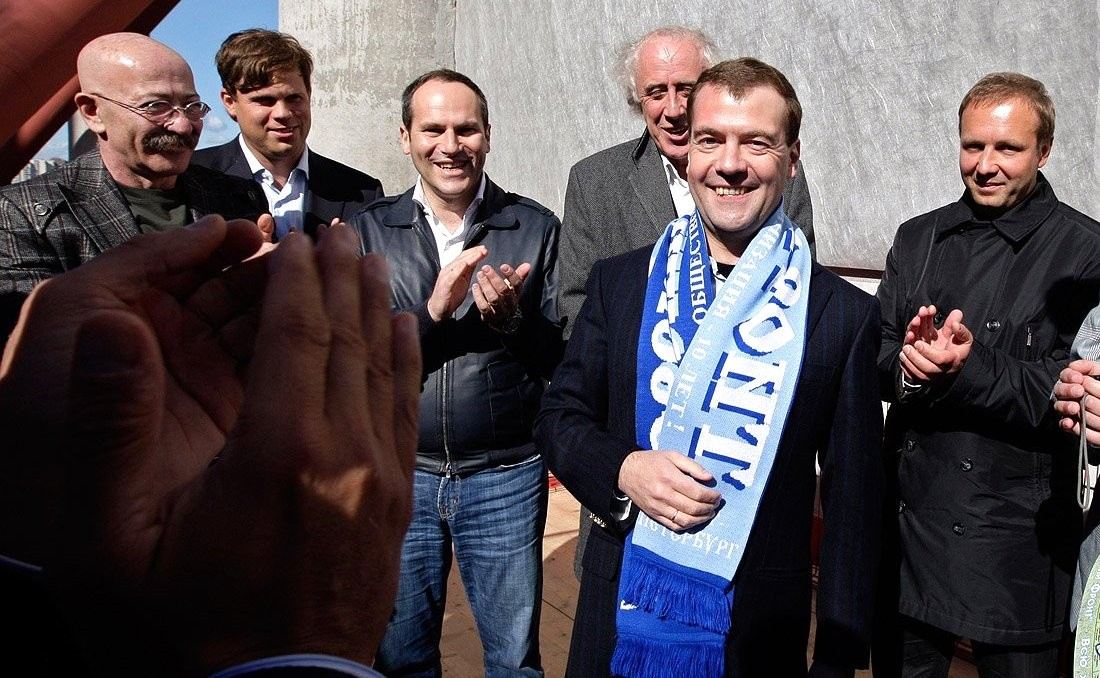
Shats with President Dmitry Medvedev, Alexander Rosenbaum, Vladislav Radimov and Sergey Migitsko

From 2004 to 2012, Shats hosted the program Good Jokes with Lazareva and Alexander Pushnoy on the STS TV channel. From 2006 to 2010, he was the host of the humorous improv show Thank God You're Here! on the same channel (the show was later aired on DTV as well).

In 2007, Shats was made a member of the Academy of Russian Television.

Since 2018, he has been performing as a stand-up comedian both solo and with Anton Borisov, Alexei Kvashonkin, and Garik Oganisyan.

Shats left Russia in March 2022 due to the Russian invasion of Ukraine. He resided in Israel as he had previously obtained Israeli citizenship in 2016. On 2 September 2022, the Russian Ministry of Justice included Shats in the list of "foreign agents".

== Political activity ==
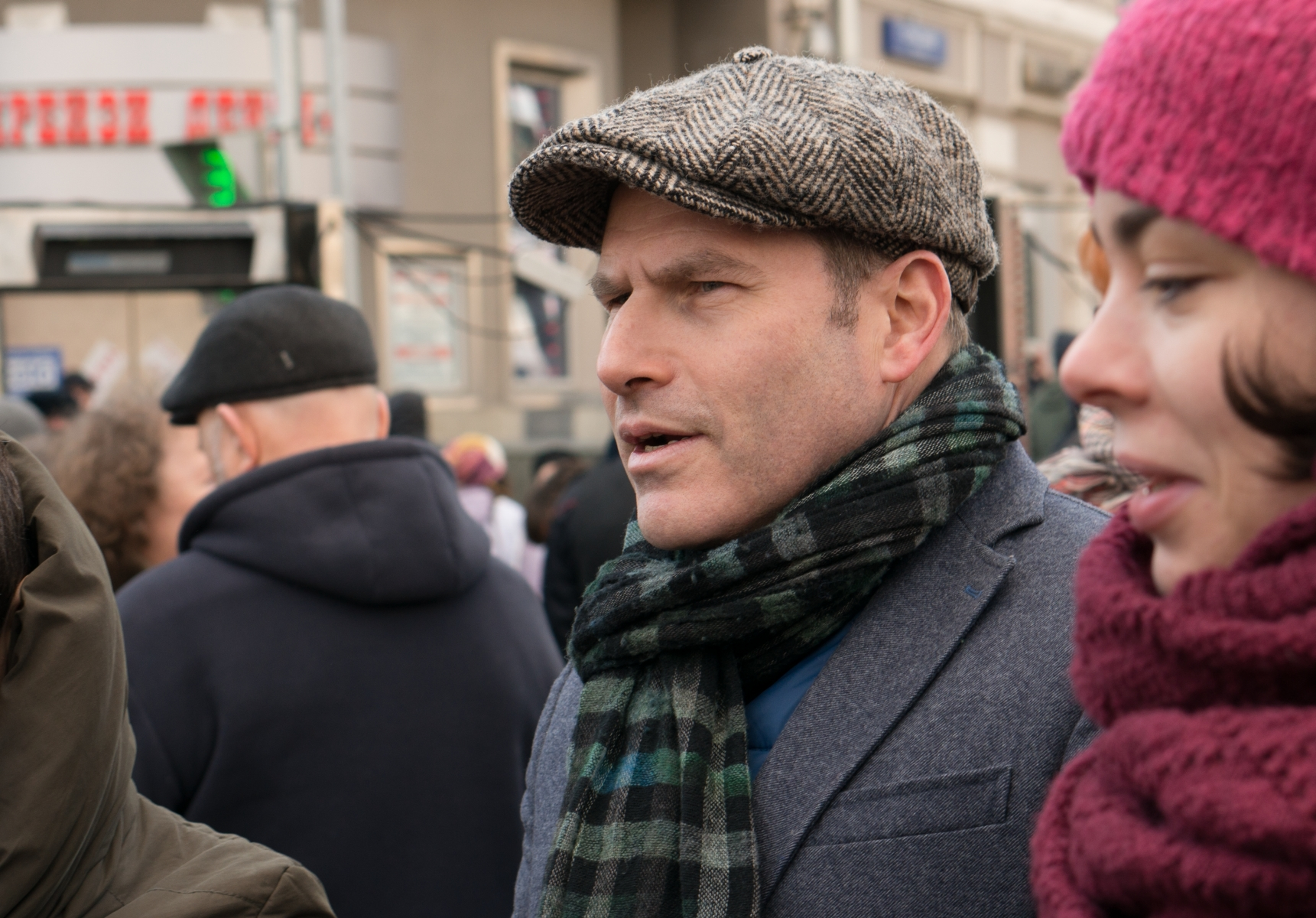
Shats attending Boris Nemtsov remembering rally in Moscow, 2016

Together with Tatiana Lazareva, Shats supported the Sozidaniye Charitable Foundation, which assisted orphanages, children's homes, boarding schools, hospitals, and children undergoing treatment in clinics. They also supported the Downside Up Charitable Foundation and actively participated in the foundation's events dedicated to changing society's attitude towards children with Down syndrome.

Shats joined the Russian protest movement (also known as the Bolotnaya revolution) in December 2011. Later, he took part in the elections for the Coordinating Council of the Russian Opposition and was ranked eighth on the candidates' list. Due to his participation in the protests, Shats was fired from the STS TV channel in 2012.

In March 2013, Shats recorded a video appeal in support of the LGBT community and spoke out against the law banning the so-called "propaganda of homosexuality". He was also a member of the public council of the Russian Jewish Congress.

In February 2022, Shats signed an anti-war letter condemning the Russian government for waging war against Ukraine.

== Awards ==
- TEFI "Best Entertainment Program" (2003)
- TEFI "Best Entertainment Program Host" (2006)

== Family ==
Shats is of Jewish origin. He is married to Tatiana Lazareva. She is a TV presenter, actress, singer, and opposition activist. The couple has three children.

In 2021, Shats and Lazareva announced that they had separated. However, as of October 2022, they were not officially divorced.
