= Alexey Gaskarov =

Russian social activist and economist

- Алексей Гаскаров
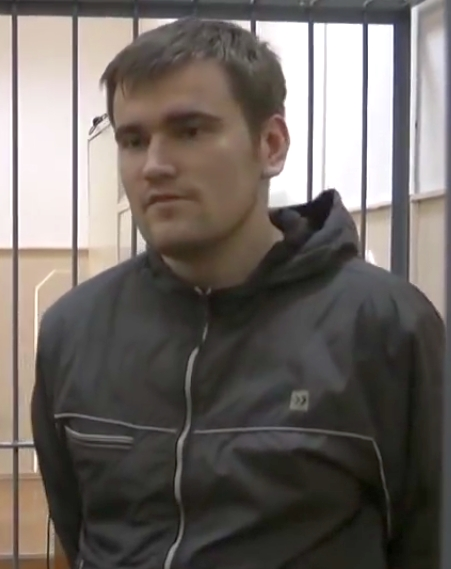
- Gaskarov in 2013
- Born: 18 June 1985 (age 41); Moscow, Russia
- Education: Financial University under the Government of the Russian Federation
- Occupations: Economist, social activist

Alexey Vladimirovich Gaskarov (also spelled Alexei, Aleksei, or Aleksey; born 18 June 1985) is a Russian social activist and economist who has been a major figure in the democratic, left-wing opposition to the regime of Vladimir Putin. He was a leader of the Russian antifascist movement, and a member of the Coordinating Council of the anti-Putin opposition. He became famous as a prominent critic of the government's destruction of woodland.

In 2010, Gaskarov was a spokesman for a large environmental protest in the Moscow suburb of Khimki. He was put on trial and found not guilty. In May 2012, he was beaten during the Bolotnaya Square protests in Moscow, and was later arrested, tried, and convicted. On August 18, 2014, he was sentenced to three and a half years in a penal colony.

== Early life and education ==
He was born on June 18, 1985, in the Moscow suburb of Zhukovsky. He began to be politically active while in school. He began his political activism by participating in and organizing grass-roots efforts to protect the Khimki and Tsagovsky forests from destruction.

Gaskarov was known as the "unofficial mayor" of Zhukovsky, where he sought to encourage fellow citizens to organize and demand their rights. In Zhukovsky, Gaskarov "organized a homeowners association, a soccer club, participated in creating a coffee shop, opened a movie theater, organized screenings and concerts," and engaged in other civic activities. "Gaskarov has invested a great deal of time and energy in seeing that his hometown of Zhukovsky... develops in a way that is responsive to the needs of ordinary citizens," stated one source.

"As a community organizer and activist in his hometown... he was an emerging talent in leftist opposition circles," according to one source. He has "advocated for free and fair elections. Amid a rise in nationalist and neo-Nazi activity in Russia, he was a leader in the anti-fascist movement." Feodor Karpov, the father of Gaskarov's fiancée, stated "He was for justice but was always trying to find a constructive solution."

In 2007 he graduated from the State Government Academy of Finances.

After graduating in 2007, he began work as a consultant.

== Activism ==
=== Khimki protests and trial ===
He became famous in Russia and elsewhere when he was arrested on August 30, 2010, a day after a grassroots protest in the Moscow suburb of Khimki in which he was as a spokesman. The protest was against the government's plan to destroy the Khimki Forest in order to construct a new Moscow-St. Petersburg highway. Gaskarov was known as one of the "Khimki hostages."

On October 22, 2010, Gaskarov was released from police custody by Khimki Judge Svetlana Galanova in defiance of an appeal by the prosecution to leave him in police custody. Gaskarov expressed surprise at the judge's action, saying that he had little faith in the Russian judicial system. The prosecution presented no new evidence against Gaskarov, aside from an FSB report stating that Gaskarov was a longtime activist of the antifascist movement (apparently in an informal youth association), was an organizer and participant of unauthorized actions (and so detained on March 20, 2010, for it), had foreign contacts, and had taken part in unsanctioned protests. The prosecution accused him of Gaskarov testified "that anti-fascism is not a crime, that his antifascist views cannot be cause to place him under arrest, and that his trips abroad are his own personal affair." Gaskarov said that on March 20 he participated in the march as a correspondent for the NGO Institute "Collective action" and, after his arrest, was acquitted by the magistrate's court. On July 28, Gaskarov also arrived in Khimki as a correspondent for Institute "Collective action", which is confirmed by a letter from the leaders of the NGO itself.

Gaskarov was released and in the summer of 2011 he was cleared of all charges. After Gaskarov was acquitted from the Khimki case, the police "subjected him to constant pressure, including several attempted provocations," according to one source.

=== December 2011 elections ===
Gaskarov was an observer at the December 4, 2011, Russian elections, and said "what we saw was quite clear-cut. Indeed, it is a weird situation when you are trying and cannot even find a single person in your circle who would say 'I voted for United Russia, and that's why this party is doing so well.' Actually there were no such people, there was no mass support for those in power."

Gaskarov went on to become an active participant in the mass demonstrations against what the protesters saw as the falsification of the December 2011 Russian elections. He spoke at the largest demonstration, on December 24, at which he also organized security, which involved forestalling neo-Nazi provocations. His public activities in December 2011 marked the beginning of his career as a high-profile media presence and commentator.

=== Bolotnaya Square protest ===
During the Bolotnaya Square protests, which took place in Moscow on May 6, 2012, the day before Vladimir Putin's inauguration as president of Russia, Gaskarov was beaten by riot police using batons and boots. The protests were the first occasion in which Russian police under Putin crushed opposition protests. One report stated that both Gaskarov and his fiancée, Anna Karpova, "found themselves caught up in the melee" between police and protesters. "The police charged and people were falling and being detained," Karpova later said. "It was chaos. I was walking behind Alexei when I heard him yell 'stop' and lunge forward."

According to one source, Gaskarov was beaten after shouting at a unit of police officers for dragging another protester across the concrete. "The soldiers beat Gaskarov with their batons and kicked him in his face so he suffered several bloody wounds. His injuries were documented in the hospital where he was treated." An amateur video showed Gaskarov "pulling a security trooper off a fallen protester and then releasing him." Another video showed "an officer kicking him in the head as he lay on the ground." That night, Gaskarov was given several stitches.

On May 28, 2012, Gaskarov attempted to open a case against the officers who had mistreated him, but no action was taken in the matter.

In October 2012, he was elected to the Coordinating Council of the Russian opposition. As a member of the Coordinating Council, "he has consistently pursued a grassroots social movement agenda."

In March 2013, Gaskarov won election to the alternative People's Council of Zhukovsky.

=== Arrest and trial ===
Almost a year after the Bolotnaya Square protests, on April 28, 2013, as he was looking to head the anti-fascists in Russia, he was taken into custody in Moscow, becoming the last person to be arrested in the Bolotnaya Square case. He was taken into custody when he left his apartment to buy groceries. His arrest came "just a few days before the anniversary of the May 6 demonstration," when "Gaskarov was preparing to lead a left-wing and anti-fascist column at May Day demonstrations."

He was charged with involvement in the organization of mass riots and in violent activity against the authorities. He was placed in jail, and was given a court date of April 29, 2013. On May 11, 2013, police detained nine people at a bicycle rally held in Moscow to show solidarity with Gaskarov.

Less than two months after Gaskarov's arrest, his lawyers asked the Moscow City Court to release him from detention pending trial. Russian Duma deputy Dmitriy Gudkov, human-rights advocate Lev Ponomarev, and Novaya Gazeta editor-in-chief Dmitriy Muratov vouched for Gaskarov, assuring the court that he would not flee the country. This request was rejected on the supposed grounds that Gaskarov "did not reside at the address where he was registered, used secrecy to conceal his criminal activity, and possesses the financial capability to leave the Russian Federation."

In late March 2014, Gaskarov's case, along with those against his fellow activists Ilya Guschin, Elena Kokhtareva, and Alexander Margolin, was sent to the Zamoskvoretskiy District Court in Moscow. During the lead-up to the trial, Anna Karpova, Gaskarov's fiancée, told the Institute of Modern Russia that "Alexey is very seriously preparing for the trial. He wants to utilize his legal base to its full extent and is going to participate in the process to the fullest extent. Even despite the circumstances, when one might think it impossible to influence the process, he is very active in terms of defending and asserting his position." His pretrial hearing began on April 14.

One commentator described the trial as "a farce which demonstrates that the facts are completely irrelevant for the outcome." At the trial, the persons presented as witnesses were not identified by their real names but by pseudonyms. These witnesses purportedly testified that Gaskarov "had given orders to a group of people who actively participated in the 'mass riots.'" The prosecutor also claimed that Gaskarov had pulled an "internal forces soldier" by his hand and pulled a member of the OMON riot police away from another activist whom he was placing under detention. Neither officer was harmed. Gaskarov acknowledged that he had sought to protect a fellow activist from an officer, explaining that "people who did not demonstrate any aggressive behavior were being beaten and detained." One report stated that the charges against Gaskarov were "based on the statements of two 'secret witnesses.' Another individual said during the trial that a state government agency, the Anti-Extremist Center, had pressured him "to make a false statement against Gaskarov." In secret testimony, police officers said "they had video evidence that Gaskarov had led attacks on police, though the footage was never shown."

As the trial proceeded, on source stated "Gaskarov was repeatedly denied bail, and evidence that might have helped clear him was rejected or ignored." Another report stated that Gaskarov and his lawyers were "convinced" that authorities wanted to imprison him "by any means" because of his political activity. Critics said the trial was "part of a Kremlin campaign to stifle dissent while all eyes are on the Ukraine crisis." Acting on the assumption that he would be found guilty, Gaskarov and Karpova were married at his Moscow prison in early August.

On August 14, 2014, Gaskarov gave his closing statement at the trial. He said that the case had "become emblematic" because it showed "how power deals with opposition – with those whose view is different from the general line." He stated that the movement against the Putin regime had drawn more and more members because of Putin's declaration "that the idea of interchangeability of power wasn't best for Russia." He added that "we should be happy that the events on the Bolotnaya Square happened exactly this way because in all developed democratic countries protests...shape political competition, which allows a country to find an optimal way of development." He also asked: "is there a right to protest in Russia, which all developed countries have? At present, as we can see, Russia is deprived of this right." He further pointed out that none of the police that had abused him and other protesters had been brought up on criminal charges; on the contrary, he said, "our case has been an attempt to make the police into some untouchable caste." In conclusion, Gaskarov asked that the judge make a decision based not on politics but on "what we have really done." Still, he said, "in this country, if the path to freedom lies through prison, then we are ready to take it."

On August 18, Judge Natalia Susina sentenced Gaskarov to three and a half years in a penal colony for "inciting mass riots." His co-defendant Ilya Goushchin was sentenced to two and a half years and Alexander Margolin to three and a half years.

Karpov said in August 2014 that electoral and judicial corruption had destabilized Russia's political system to the extent that the only solutions were now extreme ones, and as a result Russians may eventually "find that figures like Alexei Gaskarov," a reformer and not a revolutionary, "would be sorely missed."
