= Tatyana Lazareva =

Soviet-Israeli actress (born 1966)

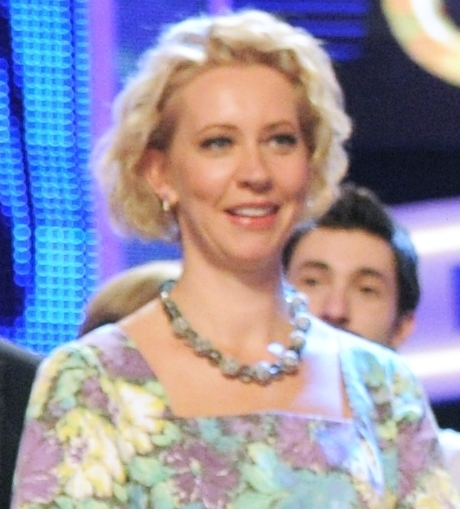

Tatyana Lazareva (born 1966) is a Russian television presenter and comedian, who has been in self-exile from Russia since 2022.

== Life ==
Tatyana Lazareva was born in 1966 in Novosibirsk, Novosibirsk Oblast. She became a "popular television presenter and comedian" in Russia. A recognisable celebrity, and known for being the mother of a large family, she appeared in a commercial for Zdrivers yogurt drink for children.

Lazareva has been a regular critic of the Russian government. In December 2011 she spoke at the Bolotnaya Square protests. In 2013 she criticized the law banning "LGBT propaganda". In 2014 she condemned Russia's annexation of Crimea.

After Moscow's invasion of Ukraine in February 2022, Lazareva left Russia with her husband Mikhail Shats. The pair were declared "foreign agents" in July 2022. In June 2023 the Presnensky District Court in Moscow fined Lazareva in absentia for failing to label her social media as the work of "a foreign agent", and in June 2024 announced her arrest in absentia.

Lazareva has continued making documentary television since leaving Russia. In the documentary film "Where Am I?" she interviews Russian-speaking teenagers who emigrated to Germany after Russia's invasion of Ukraine.
