= Vladimir Ashurkov =

Russian public figure

- Владимир Ашурков
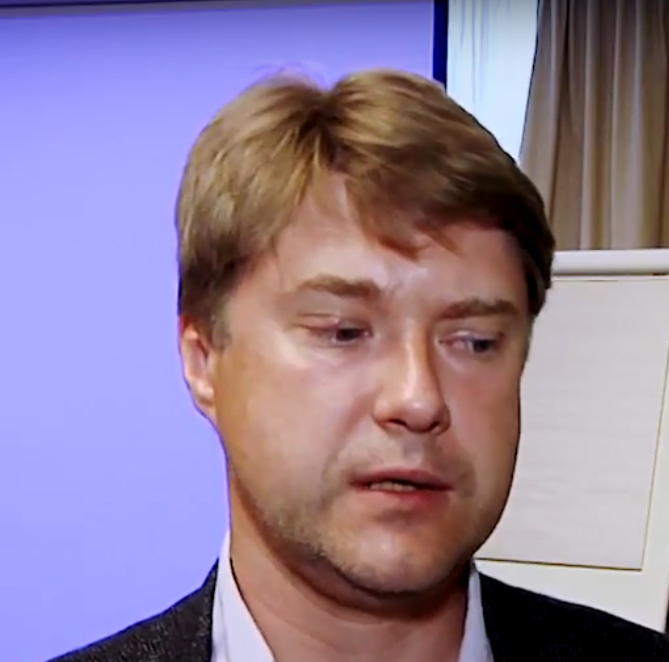
- Ashurkov in 2013

Executive Director of the Anti-Corruption Foundation

Personal details
- Born: Vladimir Lvovich Ashurkov; 15 February 1972 (age 54) Moscow, Russian SFSR, Soviet Union
- Party: Russia of the Future
- Spouse: Alexandrina Markvo
- Education: Moscow Institute of Physics and Technology; Wharton School of the University of Pennsylvania
- Known for: Executive Director of the Anti-Corruption Foundation (FBK); Director of Group Portfolio Management at Alfa Group

Vladimir Lvovich Ashurkov (Russian: Владимир Львович Ашурков; born 15 February 1972) is a Russian political figure and the Executive Director of the Anti-Corruption Foundation. A former banker, Ashurkov was the Director of Group Portfolio Management and Control at Alfa Group Consortium from 2006 to 2012, when he was asked to step down due to his political involvement with Alexei Navalny. He was also on the board of the X5 Retail Group during this time.

In 2014, a panel of the Investigative Committee of Russia accused Ashurkov of embezzling funds from Alexei Navalny's 2013 Moscow mayoral campaign, after which he sought and was granted political asylum in the UK, claiming the allegations were politically motivated. Both Ashurkov and Navalny claim that the allegations are unfounded.

After relocating, Ashurkov organised bus tours for activists and journalists, similar to Roman Gul's "Kleptocrats Tour", "to show the opulence and corruption of the Russian oligarchy in London." He does this, says Ashurkov, according to the Stuttgarter Zeitung, to alert the British authorities to dirty money, as for example in Witanhurst owned by Andrey Guryev. Ashurkov advises the British government to dispense with the "dirty money", even though, according to Benjamin Plackett of Stuttgarter Zeitung, the "intertwining of Russian wealth with the British economy" complicates the policy.

== Early life and education ==
Ashurkov was born in 1972 in Moscow into a family of engineers who worked in research institutes of military–industrial complex. He received a Bachelor of Science degree in Physics from the Moscow Institute of Physics and Technology. In 1996, he graduated from the Wharton School of the University of Pennsylvania with an MBA.

== Career in business ==
=== Early career ===
During the 1990s, Ashurkov worked as a financial analyst in PepsiCo Holding and as an investment banker in Renaissance Capital. From 1999 onwards, he held executive roles in the transportation industry, including the post of financial director of the Saint Petersburg Sea Port.

=== Alfa Group ===
In 2006, he assumed the position of the Director of Group Portfolio Management at Alfa Group. During his tenure, Ashurkov served as director of asset management at CTF Holdings, a subsidiary of Alfa Group, and as a board member of X5 Retail Group, one of Russia's largest food retail chains.

=== Association with Alexei Navalny and departure from Alfa Group ===
In 2009, Ashurkov started reading a blog of Alexey Navalny, then a young lawyer who was writing about corruption, on LiveJournal. As he stated in a 2012 interview to "Novaya Gazeta", Ashurkov got interested in how Navalny approaches problems, and wrote him a letter offering help on correcting some of the cases.

As Ashurkov’s collaboration with Navalny deepened, he became his key strategic advisor. During this period, Ashurkov was involved in managing the business of Alfa Group as the Director of Group Portfolio Management and Control, a role that involved high-level strategic analysis and oversight of major investment projects. In late 2010, Ashurkov informed the chairman of Alfa Group’s supervisory board, Mikhail Fridman, of his work with Navalny. While Fridman remained neutral, he cautioned that Ashurkov's political leanings might likely eventually necessitate his departure from the company. In February 2012, Fridman requested his resignation, later stating that active political engagement was "not fully tolerable" for a business of Alfa Group’s scale in the Russian context. Ashurkov resigned. In interviews, he stated that he had chosen civic engagement over his corporate career.

== Political career ==
=== Foundation of ACF ===
In 2012, Ashurkov became the executive director of the Anti-Corruption Foundation (FBK), which had been founded by Alexei Navalny in 2011. He is credited with moving it from a volunteer-based initiative to a structured NGO with dedicated legal and economic departments. During the 2013 Moscow mayoral election, Ashurkov developed a crowdfunding mechanism for Navalny's campaign that sought to work within the constraints of Russian campaign finance regulations.

=== Political persecution and immigration from Russia ===
In October 2012, Ashurkov was elected to the Russian Opposition Coordination Council, receiving 28,754 votes in the general civil list. in May 2014, Russian authorities opened a criminal case against him, Nikolai Lyaskin, and Konstantin Yankauskas, alleging embezzlement of funds from Navalny’s mayoral campaign. Ashurkov dismissed the charges as politically motivated and left Russia for the United Kingdom in 2014.

=== Navalny’s arrest ===
Following Alexey Navalny’s arrest in January 2021, Ashurkov published an open letter to Western leaders, including U.S. President Joe Biden, containing a "List of 35" Russian officials and oligarchs recommended for targeted sanctions. Ashurkov continued to assist in the FBK's international relations and strategy from London until stepping down as executive director in 2023.

After relocating, Ashurkov participated as a guide in kleptocracy bus tours in London, organized by the campaign group ClampK and its founder Roman Borisovich. In 2020, Ashurkov founded Zorge Partners Limited, a London-based firm specialising in investigations, due diligence, and litigation support, with a focus on Russia and Eastern Europe.

== Personal life ==
Ashurkov is married to Alexandrina Markvo, a theatrical producer and the founder of the arts production company Bird & Carrot. Markvo also sought and received asylum in the UK after being targeted by a fraud investigation in Russia that was regarded as politically motivated due to her husband's activism. The couple resides in London with their two sons, Nikola and Lev, and Markvo's daughter from a previous marriage, Ariadna.
