= Konstantin Krylov =

Russian journalist (1967–2020)

- Константин Крылов
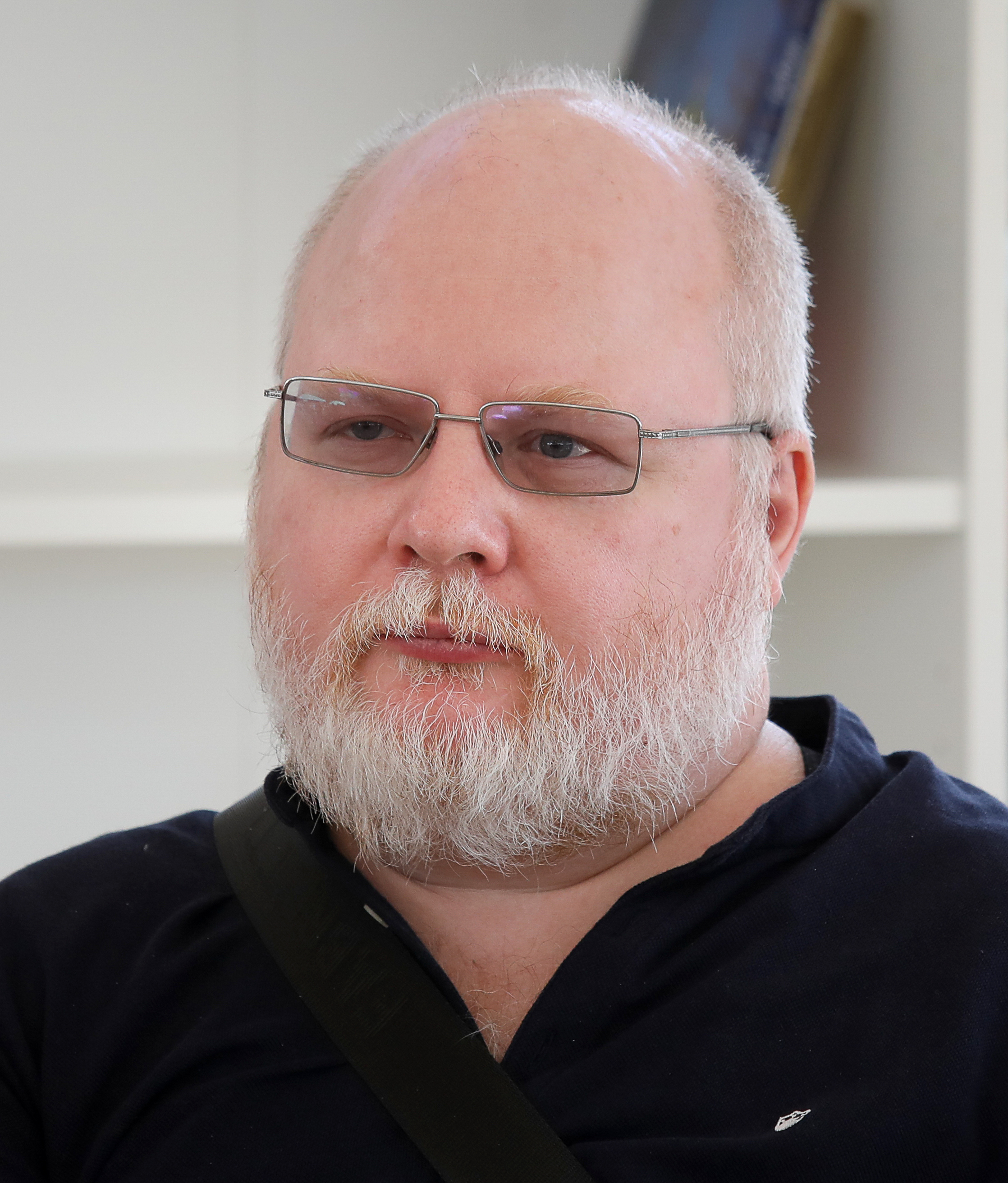
- 2019
- Born: 18 October 1967; Moscow, RSFSR, Soviet Union
- Died: 12 May 2020 (aged 52); Pushkino, Moscow Oblast, Russia
- Education: Moscow State University
- Writing career
- Pen name: Mikhail Kharitonov
- Language: Russian
- Website: krylov.cc

Konstantin Anatolyevich Krylov (Russian: Константин Анатольевич Крылов, 1967–2020) was a Russian nationalist writer, journalist and philosopher.

== Biography ==
Konstantin Krylov was born in Moscow in 1967. He graduated from the Faculty of Cybernetics of the Moscow Engineering Physics Institute and the Faculty of Philosophy of Moscow State University. His mother, Valentina Krylova, worked at the Research Institute of Information Systems at the First Chief Directorate of the KGB, as the head of the laboratory.

In the 1990s, Krylov worked at NITKON, an analytical firm created by former employees of the Research Institute of Information Systems. From 2003 to 2009 he was editor-in-chief of the Russian Spetsnaz newspaper. Since 2005, he has been one of the main organizers of the Russian marches in Moscow. In 2006 he became member of the Central Committee of the Congress of Russian Communities. Since 2007 — editor-in-chief of the Russian March newspaper. According to the poll conducted in 2009 by Openspace (now Colta.ru), in which more than 40 thousand votes were cast, Krylov took the 5th place among the most influential intellectuals in Russia.

In 2011, he was sentenced to 120 hours of correctional labor under Article 282 of the Criminal Code of Russia after his speech at the rally "Stop feeding the Caucasus", which took place on Bolotnaya Square in Moscow. Krylov was the creator of the unregistered National Democratic Party in 2012. Due to a criminal record, he could not legally lead the party, nevertheless, he was perceived as the informal head of the NDP. In October 2012, he was elected to the Coordinating Council of the Russian Opposition from the nationalists.

On 20 April 2020, Krylov suffered a hemorrhagic stroke and he was admitted to the Botkin hospital, then he was transferred to a rehabilitation center in Moscow Oblast. He died on 12 May 2020. The cremation took place on May 15, 2020, the ashes were buried at the Troyekurovskoye Cemetery on 20 June.

== Works ==
From 2013 to 2019 Krylov was working on his main novel, The Golden Key, or the Adventures of Buratino (the name itself is a reference to 1936 book by A.N. Tolstoy), which was nominated for the New Horizons 2018 award. Some of Krylov's works self-described as “conspiracy-leaning ironic fantasy” were published under pseudonym Mikhail Kharitonov.

== Views ==
Krylov advocated gun rights and the introduction of a visa regime with the countries of Central Asia and Transcaucasia. He was a supporter of "national democracy", meaning conjugation of Russian nationalist ideas with representative democracy and free market.

In fact, nationalism and democracy are practically the same thing. Now it is important to rid Russian [nationalist] organizations of the last remaining prejudices in relation to civil society, democracy, and the free market. Authoritarian sympathies are rather a disease for the movement. But those who were ill received immunity for life. In fact, I think that the best democrats come from the former fascists.

In 1992 he converted to Zoroastrianism.

I was in Uzbekistan, where I met the local Persians who fled from the so-called "Islamic revolution." Several years passed, and I was officially initiated. That is, I am not a person who simply declared himself a Zoroastrian

== Works ==
- Поведение [Behaviour] (in Russian). Moscow: Педагогический поиск. 1997. ISBN 5-901030-05-2.
- Alexeev, Mikhail; Krylov, Konstantin (2001). Особенности национального поведения [Peculiarities of national behavior] (in Russian). Moscow: Арт-Бизнес-Центр. ISBN 5-7287-0201-5.
- Нет времени [There is no time] (in Russian). Saint-Petersburg: Владимир Даль. 2006. ISBN 5-902565-08-1.
- Прогнать чертей [Chase away the chorts] (in Russian). Moscow: СкименЪ. 2010. ISBN 978-5-903066-06-3.
- Русские вопреки Путину [Russians in spite of Putin] (in Russian). Moscow: Алгоритм. 2010. ISBN 978-5-4320-0079-8.
