= Rustem Adagamov =

Russian blogger (born 1961)

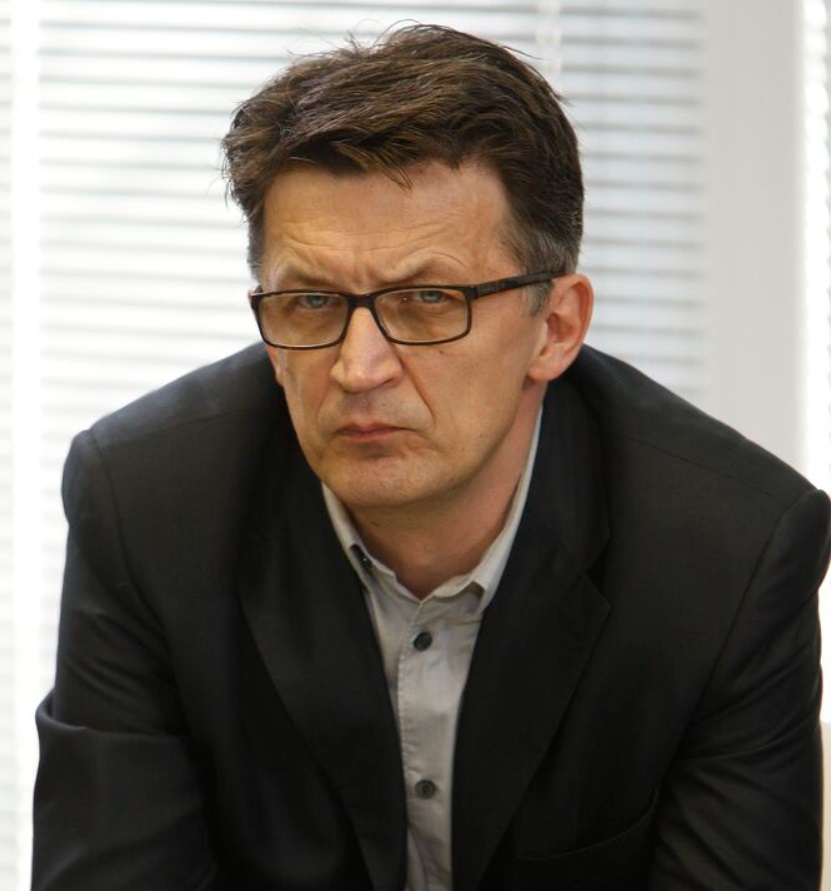
- Rustem Adagamov in 2011
- Born: Rustem Rinatovich Adagamov; November 8, 1961 (age 64); Kazan, Soviet Union
- Other name: Drugoi
- Citizenship: Russia; Norway
- Education: Russian State University for the Humanities
- Occupation: Blogger
- Children: 2
- Website: drugoi.livejournal.com

Rustem Rinatovich Adagamov (Russian: Русте́м Рина́тович Адага́мов) is a Russian blogger who goes by the pseudonym of "Drugoi" ("Другой"), meaning "Another". The Daily Telegraph has described Adagamov as "Russia's number one blogger".

In 2009 Kremlin's press department invited him to cover a meeting between Dmitry Medvedev and his visiting Indian counterpart Pratibha Patil.
