= Golos (election monitor) =

Russian organization for election monitoring

- Movement for Defence of Voters' Rights Golos
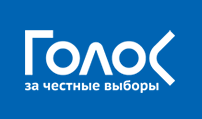
- Formation: 2000 ("GOLOS" Association); 2013 ("Golos" Movement)
- Legal status: Movement
- Purpose: Election monitoring
- Location: Moscow, Russia
- Coordinates: 55°46′21.5″N 37°40′20″E
- Field: Elections in Russia
- Key people: Grigory Melkonyants (co-chair); Stanislav Andreychuk (co-chair); Roman Udot (co-chair)
- Award: Andrei Sakharov Freedom Award (2012)
- Website: www.golosinfo.org/en

The Movement for Defence of Voters' Rights "Golos" (Russian: ГОЛОС, lit. 'vote; voice'), formerly GOLOS Association, was a Russian organisation established in 2000 to protect the electoral rights of citizens and to foster civil society. As of 2008, the organisation covers 40 Russian regions. It was the only election watchdog active in Russia that was independent of the Russian government, until it announced it would close on July 8, 2025.

== Founding ==
GOLOS was founded as an association of non-profit organizations in 2000 to support civil monitoring of elections.

== Funding ==
Michael McFaul, a Russian ambassador at the time, claimed in 2012 that Golos was funded by a US government agency. However, he didn't disclose details on for how long. Before being expelled from Russia in September 2012, USAID had been partly funding Golos.

== Activities ==
Since 2002 GOLOS has monitored elections and referendums of all levels. The Telegraph describes GOLOS as being "one of the few organisations able to catalogue and publicise [the Kremlin's] attempts at fraud and intimidation".

The group publishes a newspaper called Grazhdansky Golos (Civil Voice).

=== 2008 presidential election ===
In the 2008 presidential election and accompanying local elections, GOLOS representatives found many irregularities, including the following.

- incomplete combined protocols, as in 50% of polling stations in Ufa, Kostroma and Kursk;
- failure of electoral commissions to prevent voters from reusing their absentee ballots in Veliky Novgorod, Tomsk, Kazan, Yekaterinburg, Ufa;
- casting ballots by some voters on behalf of other people in Krasnodar, Vladimir, Kostroma;
- presence of government officials other than members of electoral commissions in Omsk, Adygea, Barnaul, Yekaterinburg, Yoshkar-Ola, Perm, Pskov.

=== 2011 legislative election ===
During the 2011 Russian legislative election, 2,000 monitors coordinated by GOLOS took part in election observation.

GOLOS set up an interactive map of violations to which users could submit reports, video evidence, audio recordings and photographs. It attracted over 4,500 reports alleging illegal campaign tactics, including stories of employers threatening workers with pay cuts and local officials ordering business leaders to pressure subordinates.

Citing the map, Russian prosecutors charged GOLOS with publishing election data during the five days before voting. It also accused Golos of "dissemination of rumors under the guise of trustworthy reports, with the goal of defaming a party as well as its individual members.” Golos was subsequently fined for these alleged breaches.

During the election, the website was subjected to Denial-of-service attacks. The state-owned channel NTV showed reports accusing GOLOS Association of disrupting the elections paid for by the United States.

=== 2012 "foreign agent" registration and prosecution ===
In early 2012, Russia introduced legislation which required NGOs receiving foreign donations to present themselves as "foreign agents" in outward communication.

The same year, GOLOS received the Andrei Sakharov Freedom Award of the Norwegian Helsinki Committee. While both Golos and the Helsinki Committee stated that Golos had not accepted the prize money, Russia's Justice Ministry in April 2013 used it as a reason to qualify Golos as the first "foreign agent" under the new legislation. After GOLOS refused to register as such, it was suspended in June 2013 for six months. After its suspension in 2013, GOLOS reorganized as civil movement "Golos" to continue its work.

On 7 July 2015, Russian police raided the offices and the homes of several Golos employees and confiscated equipment including computers. Police linked the raids to a tax investigation against the head of the group's branch in Samara. The police raid was accompanied by a TV crew from state-controlled NTV.

In February 2016, the Justice Ministry asked Moscow's Basmanny District Court to ban GOLOS, citing a failure to present proper documentation.

In July 2016, a court ordered the liquidation of Golos within six months due to "serious irremediable breaches of law”. Golos is appealing the decision.

=== Russian invasion of Ukraine ===
During the Russian invasion of Ukraine Golos has been persecuted by the Russian government due to the anti-war attitude that many members of the movement share. The movement's candidate for the 2024 Russian presidential election, Grigory Melkonyants, has been under strict supervision by Russian authorities, and 14 of his associates had their homes searched across eight different oblasts. Vladimir Yegorov, the party's election coordinator, was arrested for "disobeying the police" during the search of his home.

On 8 July 2025, Golos was forced to close, after the Basmanny District Court in Moscow convicted Melkonyants for allegedly working with the European Network of Election Monitoring Organizations, which the Russian government declared "undesirable" in 2021 despite never operating in the country.

In 2026, the International Public Movement "In Defense of Voter Rights 'Golos'" was declared an undesirable organization in Russia.

== Structure ==
From around 2011 through to 2021, Golos was a member of the European Network of Election Monitoring Organizations (ENEMO). As of 2016, it is a member of the European Platform for Democratic Elections (epde) an association of election monitors in Eastern Europe.

After its suspension in 2013, Golos reorganized as a civil movement. It consists of independent organizations such as Golos-Povolzhye (located in Samara) and Golos-Ural (located in Chelyabinsk).

After an appeal by the Presidential Human Rights Council, regional organization of Golos received funds from Russia's presidential administration. In April 2013, the head of Golos Grigory Melkonyants announced that it suspended any foreign funding. In addition to the presidential grants, projects of Golos in the past have received donations from the European Commission, USAID as well as NED.

== Support from Memorial ==
On 30 November 2011 the board of the "Memorial International Society" supported GOLOS against attacks from pro-Kremlin media:

The article published by "Rossiyskaya Gazeta" about this respected organization is no different from the Soviet writings against Andrei Sakharov and Alexander Solzhenitsyn. ... The main KGB-styled complaint is simple: the organization receives money from foreign organizations and thus leads subversion. The same claim against the non-governmental organizations was voiced in a very rude manner and in a speech at the congress of Putin's "United Russia". ... We express our support and respect of the GOLOS Association and anyone who strives to make to reduce the number of possible fraud in the upcoming elections.
