= Astrakhan State Technical University =

Technical university in Astrakhan, Russia

- Астраханский государственный технический университет
- Established: 1 October 1930
- Rector: Yuri T. Pimenov
- Students: 2000/ year
- Undergraduates: 58,000
- Location: 16 Tatischev Str. Astrakhan, Russia, Russia; 46.3746°N 48.0563°E
- Website: astu.org

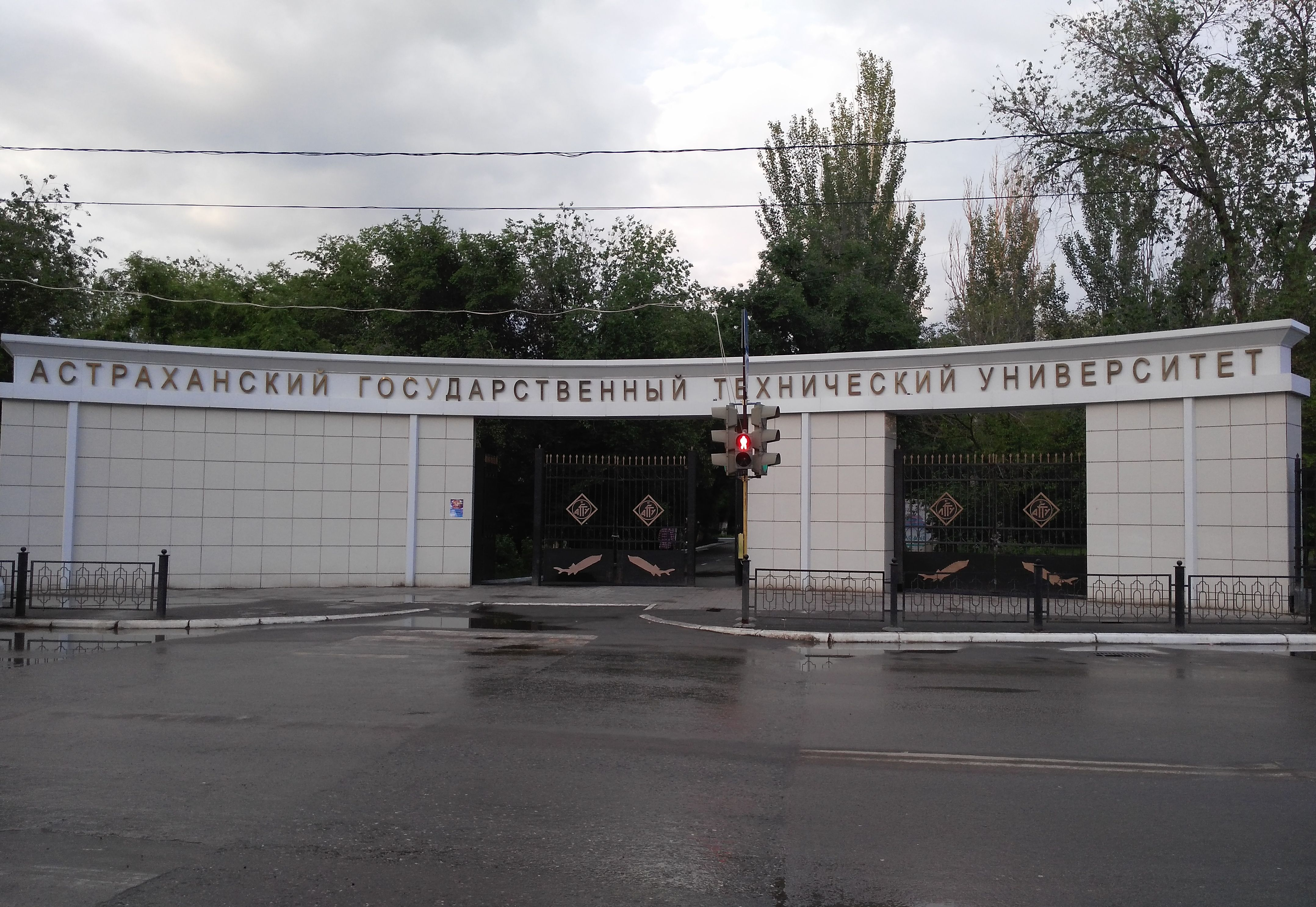
Astrakhan State Technical University

Astrakhan State Technical University (ASTU) is a technical university located in Astrakhan, Russia.

== History ==
Federal State Educational Institution of Higher Professional Education "Astrakhan State Technical University" is the legal successor of the Astrakhan Technical Institute of Fishing Industry and Economy, established in accordance with the Order of the People's Commissariat of Foreign and Domestic Trade of the USSR from May 9, 1930, No. 695 "On fish schools, colleges, rybfakah and courses".

Order of the Russian Federation State Committee for Higher Education on June 3, 1994, No. 547 "On the renaming of the Astrakhan Technical Institute of Fishing Industry and Economy" and the order of the Russian Federation of 08.07.1994 Goskorybolovstva, No. 107 "On the renaming of the institutions of the Astrakhan and Kaliningrad, the fishing industry and the economy technical universities in the state, Astrakhan technical Institute of Fishing industry and economy renamed to Astrakhan State technical University.
