= 2011–2013 Russian protests =

Protests in Russia against Vladimir Putin between December 2011 and July 2013

2011–2013 Russian protests Snow Revolution
- Part of Russian opposition protests rallies: Dissenters' Marches (2005–2008), Russian Marches, Strategy-31 (since 2009), Impact of the Arab Spring, and Colour Revolution, among others
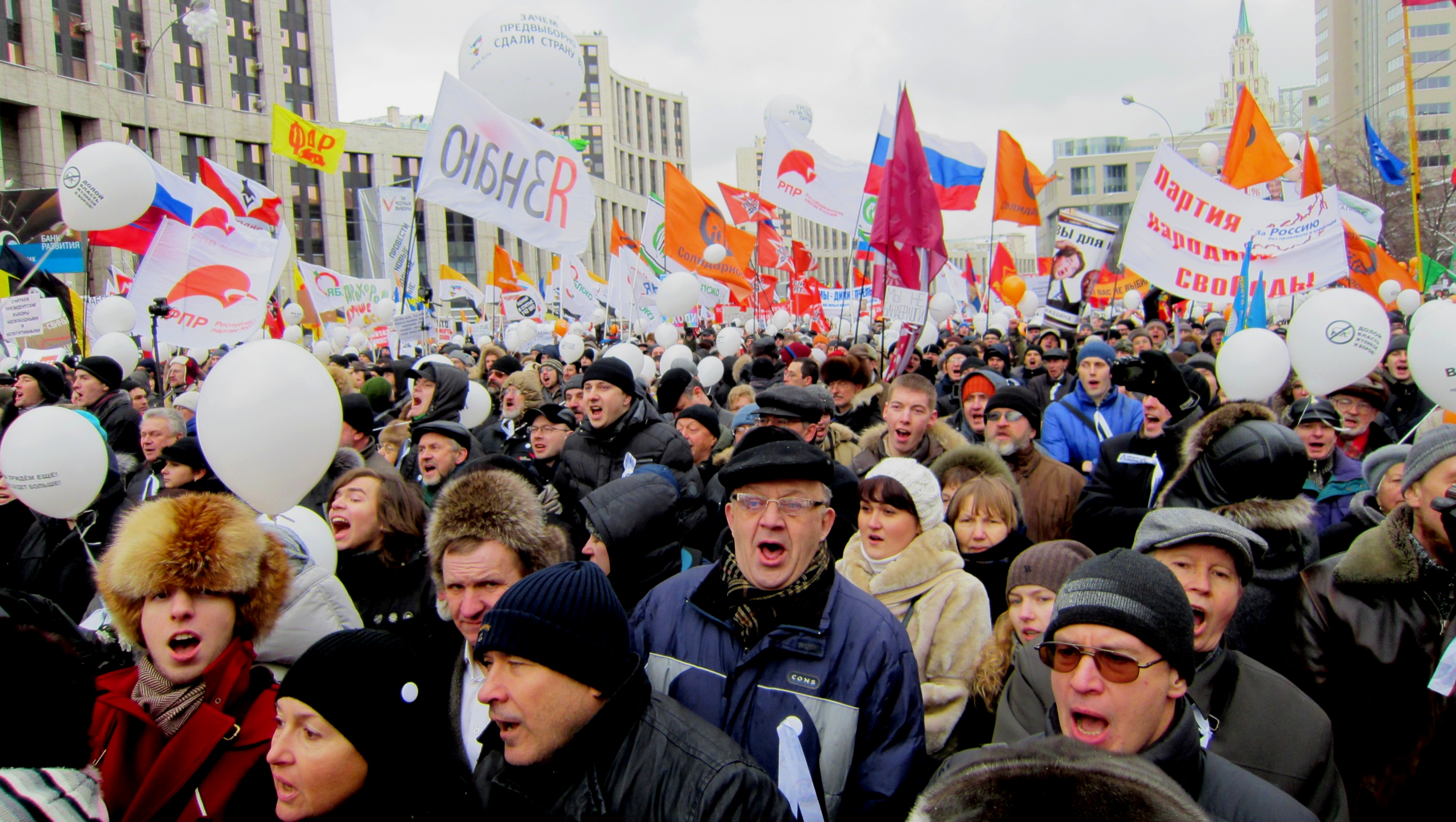
- Rally at the Academician Sakharov Avenue, Moscow, 24 December 2011
- Date: 4 December 2011 – 18 July 2013 (1 year, 7 months and 2 weeks)
- Location: Russia, primarily Moscow and Saint Petersburg
- Caused by: Authoritarianism, rigged elections, and lack of civil liberties; Corruption in Russia; Political repression
- Goals: Political freedom, fair elections, and release of political prisoners ("For Fair Elections" protests) (Note: Further requests include: Announcement of the elections were rigged and therefore cancellation of their results; Resignation of Churov and an investigation of its activities, the investigation of all available, according to the opposition, violations and falsifications, the punishment of perpetrators; Registration of opposition parties, the adoption of a democratic law on political parties and elections); Preventing colour revolution ("anti-Orange" counter-protests)
- Methods: Demonstrations, Internet activism
- Result: Protests were suppressed, with many opposition leaders repressed; Election results were not revised; Preservation of Putin and his ruling party in power

Parties
Opposition: Russian Opposition Coordination Council: Liberals; Trade unions; Socialists; Students; Greens; LGBT activists; Yabloko; Communist Party of the Russian Federation; Left Front; The Other Russia; Anarchists; Social democrats; Nationalists and monarchists; People's Freedom Party; Libertarian Party of Russia; People's Alliance; United Civil Front	Government of Russia: Ministry of Internal Affairs; Police; Internal Troops; OMON; SOBR; United Russia; Pro-government protesters: Nashi

Lead figures
Boris Nemtsov; Mikhail Kasyanov; Vladimir Ryzhkov; Grigory Yavlinsky; Sergei Udaltsov; Eduard Limonov; Alexei Navalny; Konstantin Krylov; Garry Kasparov; Viktor Shenderovich	Dmitry Medvedev (2011–2012); Vladimir Putin (2012–2013) (Russia) Sergey Kurginyan (Russia) Mikhail Leontyev (Russia) Maksim Shevchenko

Number
"For Fair Elections": 25,000 according to police, 60,000 according to organisers (Moscow, 10 December 2011); 28,000 according to police, 120,000 according to organisers (Moscow, 24 December 2011); 36,000 according to police, 160,000 according to organisers (Moscow, 4 February 2012)	"Anti-Orange": 500 according to media, 5,000 according to organisers (Moscow, 24 December 2011); 138,000 according to police (Moscow, 4 February 2012); 50,000 (the rest of the country, 4 February 2012); Pro-Putin rallies: 130,000 according to police (Moscow, 23 February 2012); 110,000 according to police (Moscow, 4 March 2012)

Criminal charges
- Arrested: Over 1,000 (almost all on the first day, some more arrests on the post-2012 election protests)

The 2011–2013 Russian protests, which some English language media referred to as the Snow Revolution (Russian: Снежная революция, romanised: Snezhnaya revolyutsiya), began in 2011 (as protests against the 2011 Russian legislative election results) and continued into 2012 and 2013. The protests were motivated by claims of Russian and foreign journalists, political activists and members of the public that the election process was fraudulent. The Central Election Commission of Russia stated that 195 out of 1,686 official reports of fraud (11.5%) could be confirmed as true.

On 10 December 2011, after a week of small-scale demonstrations, Russia saw some of the biggest protests in Moscow since the 1990s. The focus of the protests were the ruling party, United Russia, and its leader Vladimir Putin, the prime minister and former president, who announced his intention to run for president again in 2012. Another round of large protests took place on 24 December 2011. These protests were named "For Fair Elections" (Russian: За честные выборы) and their organisers set up the movement of the same name. By this time, the "For Fair Elections" protesters had coalesced around five main points: freedom for political prisoners; annulment of the election results; the resignation of Vladimir Churov (head of the election commission) and the opening of an official investigation into vote fraud; registration of opposition parties and new democratic legislation on parties and elections; as well as new democratic and open elections.

Initial protest actions, organised by the leaders of the Russian opposition parties and non-systemic opposition sparked fear in some quarters of a colour revolution in Russia, and a number of counter-protests and rallies in support of the government were held. On the first days following the election, Putin and United Russia were supported by rallies of two youth organisations, the government-organised Nashi and United Russia's Young Guard. On 24 December Sergey Kurginyan organised the first protest against what was viewed as "orange" protesters in Moscow, though the protest also went under the same slogan "For Fair Elections". On 4 February 2012, more protests and pro-government rallies were held throughout the country. The largest two events were in Moscow: the "anti-Orange protest" (alluding to the Orange Revolution in Ukraine, the most widely known colour revolution to Russians), aimed against "orangism", "collapse of the country", "perestroika" and "revolution", the largest protest action of all the protests so far according to the police; and another "For Fair Elections" protest, larger than the previous ones according to the police.

On 6 May 2012, protests took place in Moscow the day before Putin's inauguration as President for his third term. Some called for the inauguration to be scrapped. The protests were marred by violence between the protesters and the police. About 400 protesters were arrested, including Alexei Navalny, Boris Nemtsov and Sergei Udaltsov and 80 were injured. On the day of the inauguration, 7 May, at least 120 protesters were arrested in Moscow. In June 2012, laws were enacted which set strict boundaries on protests and imposed heavy penalties for unauthorised actions. As of January 2013, interviews by Ellen Barry of The New York Times of working class elements which had supported the protests revealed an atmosphere of intimidation, discouragement, and alienation.

== Background ==
=== Previous protest rallies in 2000s ===
In the 2000s, due to increased restrictions in the election legislation and the takeover of large media under state control, a non-system opposition emerged, which was barred from participation in elections. This time, it included both left and right organisations as well as nationalists.

The largest protests and main opposition events include rallies to support the old NTV staff (2001), mass protests against Mikhail Zurabov's reforms (2005), Dissenters' March (2005–2008), Russian Marches, "I am free! I forgot what it means to fear" rallies for freedom of the press (2005–2006 and 2008), Vladivostok mass protests (2008–2010), Kaliningrad mass protests (2009–2010), Day of Wrath (Left Front actions) (2009–2011), Putin.Results and Putin.Corruption campaign, Putin must go campaign, Strategy-31 (for freedom of assembly) (2009–), etc.

Committee 2008, wide coalition The Other Russia, Yabloko, Union of Right Forces, Vanguard of Red Youth, Left Front, Russian People's Democratic Union, United Civil Front, movement for Khimki forest, Solidarnost, TIGER, Society of Blue Buckets, Coalition "For Russia without Lawlessness and Corruption", etc. were among the main opposition groups within disorganised 2000s protest movement.

=== 2011 election ===
According to RIA Novosti, there were more than 1,100 official reports of election irregularities across the country, including allegations of vote fraud, obstruction of observers and illegal campaigning. Members of the A Just Russia, Yabloko and Communist parties reported that voters were shuttled between multiple polling stations to cast several ballots. The Yabloko and LDPR parties reported that some of their observers had been banned from witnessing the sealing of the ballot boxes and from gathering video footage, and some were groundlessly expelled from polling stations. The ruling United Russia party alleged that the opposition parties had engaged in illegal campaigning by distributing leaflets and newspapers at polling stations and that at some polling stations the voters had been ordered to vote for the Communist party with threats of violence. There were several reports of almost undetectable vote fraud—swapping of final polling station protocols just before final accounting by station chairmen—that happened late at night when most observers were gone.

The Central Electoral Commission issued a report on 3 February 2012, in which it said that it received the total of 1686 reports on irregularities, of which only 195 (11.5%) were upheld after investigation. A third (584) actually contained questions about the unclear points of electoral law, and only 60 complaints were claiming falsifications of the elections results. On 4 February 2012 the Investigation Committee of the Office of the Prosecutor General of the Russian Federation announced that the majority of videos allegedly showing falsifications at polling stations were in fact falsified and originally distributed from a single server in California, and the investigation on that started.

Despite the official findings, protests carried on up to and beyond 4 March presidential election.

=== Demographic and economic basis ===
According to The New York Times, the leading element has consisted of young urban professionals, the well-educated and successful working or middle-class people such as workers in social media. These groups had benefited from substantial growth in the Russian economy until the 2008 economic crisis but have been alienated by increasing political corruption as well as recent stagnation in their income. The number of such individuals is large and growing in urban centres and is thought to represent a challenge to continuation of authoritarian rule. According to Putin the legitimate grievances of this young and active element of Russian society are being exploited by opportunistic elements which seek to destabilise Russia. Nationalist elements play a significant role in the coalition which is organising and participating in the protests.

== Protests against government ==
The white ribbon is one of the protest symbols

=== 4 December 2011 ===
On 4 November 2011, during the annual Russian March event, representatives of "The Russians" movement declared a protest action planned for election day after polling districts closed. As there was no official rally permit, the action by "The Russians" was unapproved and took place on 4 December at 21:00 in Moscow. The statement of non-recognition of electoral results spread widely. Сitizens were called upon to create self-governing institutions reflecting national interests and were told of falsifications and frauds said to have occurred during the elections. Alexander Belov declared the beginning of the "Putin, go away!" campaign. The protest action, in which several hundreds persons participated, led to running battles with riot police. Leaders of "The Russians" Alexander Belov, Dmitry Dyomushkin, George Borovikov were arrested along with dozens of other nationalists. The head of the banned Movement Against Illegal Immigration organisation Vladimir Yermolaev was detained at a voting station where he was an observer. Mass detentions of other public organisations occurred in Moscow. According to police some 258 persons have been detained.

=== 5–7 December 2011 ===
On 5 December, around 5,000 opponents of the government began protesting in Moscow, denouncing Vladimir Putin and his government and what they believed were flawed elections. Campaigners argued that the elections had been a sham and demanded that Putin step down, whilst some demanded revolution. Alexei Navalny, a top blogger and anti-corruption activist who branded Putin's United Russia party as the "party of crooks and thieves", is credited with initial mobilisation of mass protests through postings on his LiveJournal blog and Twitter account. Navalny's agitation was denounced by United Russia as "typical dirty self-promotion" and a profane tweet describing Navalny as a sheep engaged in oral sex originated from Medvedev's Twitter account.

Many pro-government supporters, including the pro-Putin youth group Nashi, were mobilised on 6 December at the site of the planned demonstration where they made noise in support of the government and United Russia. There was a 15,000-strong rally of Nashi on Manezhnaya Square and an 8,000-strong rally of the Young Guard on Revolution Square. About 500 pro-United Russia activists marched near Red Square. Truckloads of soldiers and police, as well as a water cannon, were deployed ahead of expected anti-government protests. It emerged that 300 protesters had been arrested in Moscow the night before, along with 120 in St. Petersburg. During the night of 6 December, at least 600 protesters were reported to be in Triumphalnaya square chanting slogans against Putin, whilst anti-government protesters at Revolution Square clashed with riot police and interior ministry troops. The police chased around 100 away, arresting some. Protest numbers later reportedly reached over 1,000 at Triumphalnaya Square and dozens of arrests were reported, including Boris Nemtsov, an opposition leader and former deputy prime minister, and Alexey Navalny. Over 250 arrests were made, with police using buses to transport the suspects to police stations to be charged. At least one Russian journalist claimed he was beaten by police officers who stamped on him and hit his legs with batons. Another 200 arrests were reported in St. Petersburg and 25 in Rostov the same night as anti-government demonstrations took place. After three and a half hours, the Moscow protest came to an end.

Attempts to stage a large protest in Moscow on 7 December fizzled out due to a large police presence in the city.

=== 10 December 2011 ===
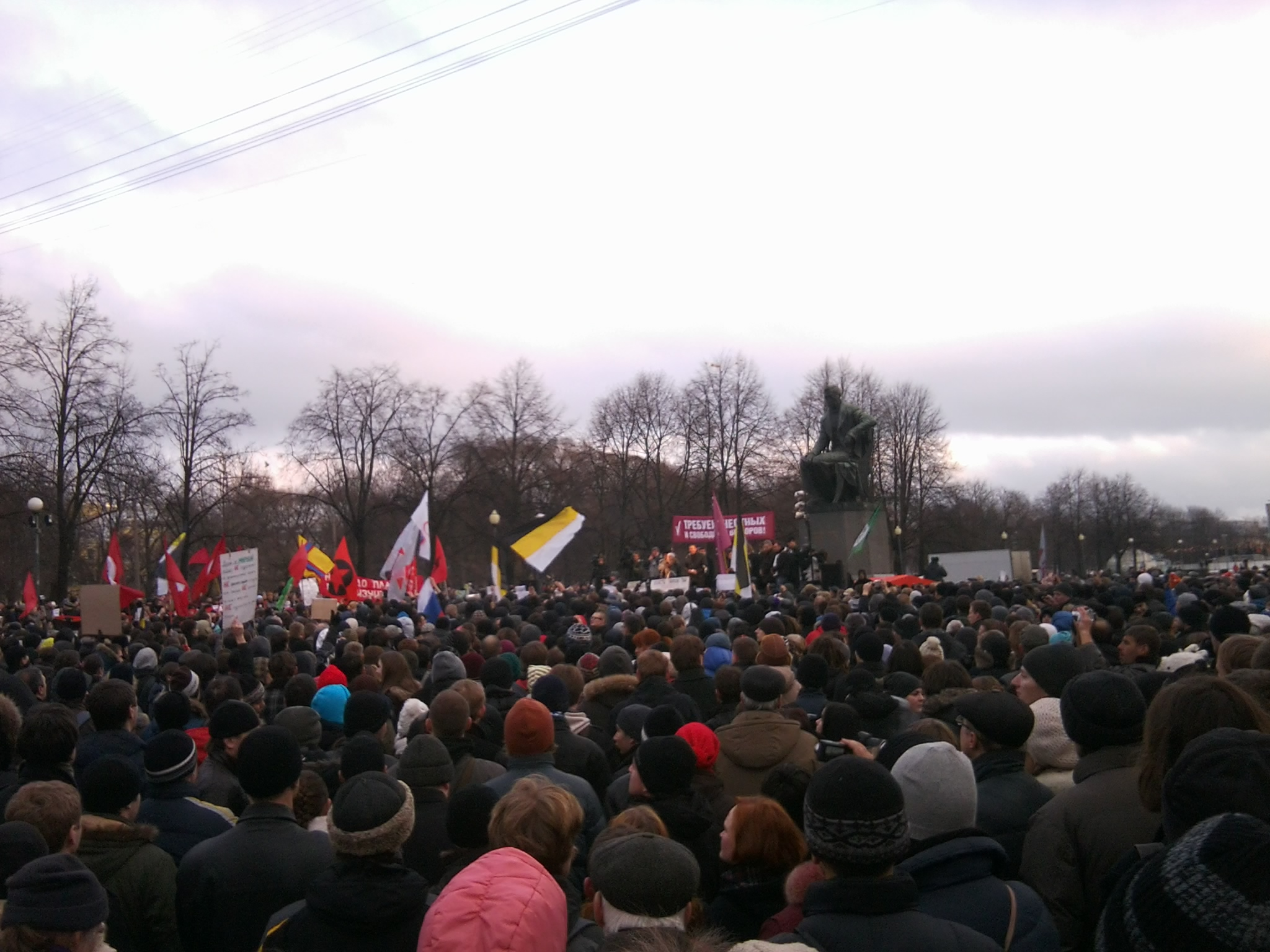
Rally in Pionerskaya Square in Saint Petersburg on 10 December 2011.

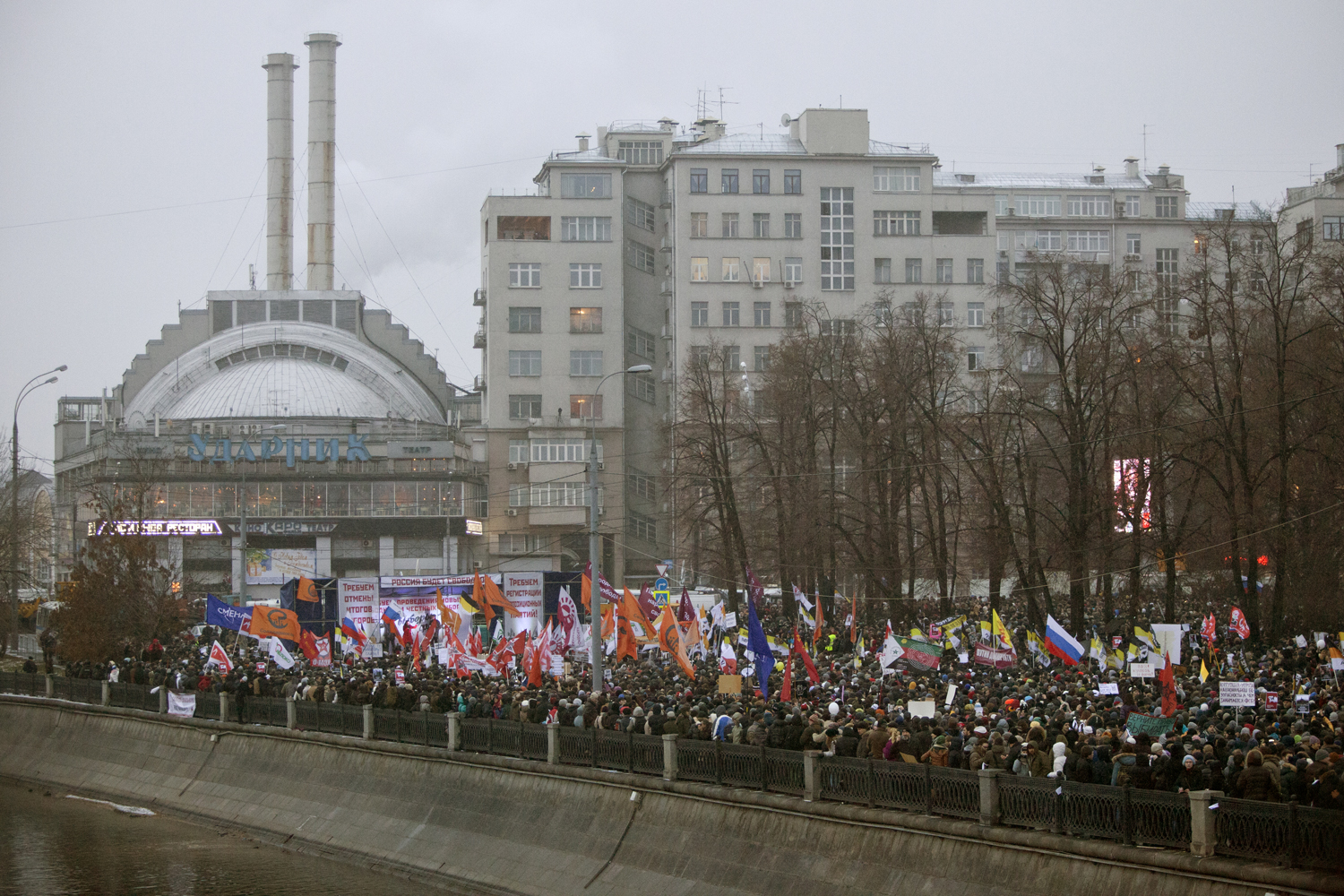
Rally in Bolotnaya Square in Moscow on 10 December 2011

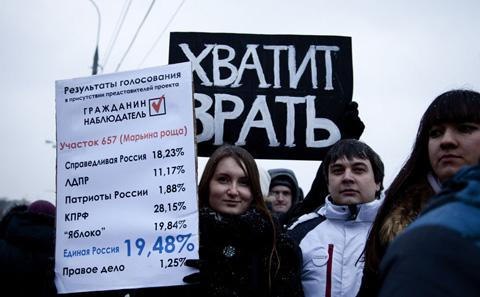
Protesters, 10 December, Bolotnaya Square, signs saying "Stop lying!" and listing the number of votes for each party on one of the polling stations, with United Russia at 19,48%, KPRF at 28,15% and Yabloko at 19,84%.

Via a Facebook group "Суббота на Болотной площади" (Saturday at Bolotnaya Square), a call was made for a mass protest against the government on Saturday 10 December. Prior to the demonstration newspapers commented that tens of thousands of Facebook users had positively responded to invitations to demonstrate in Moscow, and, similarly, over 5,000 in St. Petersburg. A permit had originally been issued to the group Solidarnost for a legal demonstration of 300 people in Revolution Square. By 8 December, more than 30,000 had accepted the Facebook invitation to attend. After negotiations with the demonstrators an alternative location for a 30,000-person demonstration was authorised by the Moscow government for the demonstration which took place on 10 December on Bolotnaya Square. Prior to the demonstration, threats were made by Putin that police and security forces would be deployed to deal with anyone participating in illegal protests in Moscow or other cities; however, the event, when it took place, was peaceful and without attempts by the state to prevent or disrupt it. Rapper Noize MC and author Boris Akunin both agreed to address the crowds, the latter flying in specially from Paris for the occasion. Guerrilla theatre by FEMEN and the circulation of a photoshopped image of Putin dressed as Muammar Gaddafi accompanied the protests.

Attempts to disrupt the protests and the organisations supporting them included repeated prank calls to Yabloko and Novaya Gazeta. Russia's chief public health official, Gennady Onishchenko, warned on Friday that protesters risked respiratory infections such as the flu or SARS. Warnings were issued that the police would be looking for draft dodgers at the protests. Students in Moscow were ordered to report Saturday during the time scheduled for the demonstration to an exam followed by a special class conducted by headmasters regarding "rules of safe behavior in the city." Opposition Twitter posts were spammed by a botnet and a YouTube video, Москва! Болотная площадь! 10 Декабря! (Moscow! Bolotnaya square! 10 December!), was posted of orcs storming a castle shouting, "Russia without Putin."

The Telegraph reported at 10:40 GMT that "Half an hour into what is likely to be Moscow's biggest demonstration since the fall of the Soviet Union, Russia's biggest state-controlled television station, Channel One, has no mention of the popular unrest on its website." Journalist Andrew Osborn noted a bad 3G telephone signal in Bolotnaya Square, asking "Wonder if they have deliberately shut off in protest area [sic]". The Guardian also reported that mobile internet had been "cut off" in the square.

The Moscow demonstration was generally peaceful ending in the afternoon with the singing of Viktor Tsoi's song "Peremen" meaning "Changes", a perestroika anthem from the 1980s. Reports of the demonstration including its large size and demands for new elections were carried on the evening news in Russia by state controlled media.

Police in Moscow estimated the protest numbers to be around 25,000, whilst the opposition claimed over 50,000 people were present during the demonstration. Other activists claimed as many as 60,000 protesters in Bolotnaya Square, Moscow.

==== Demands ====
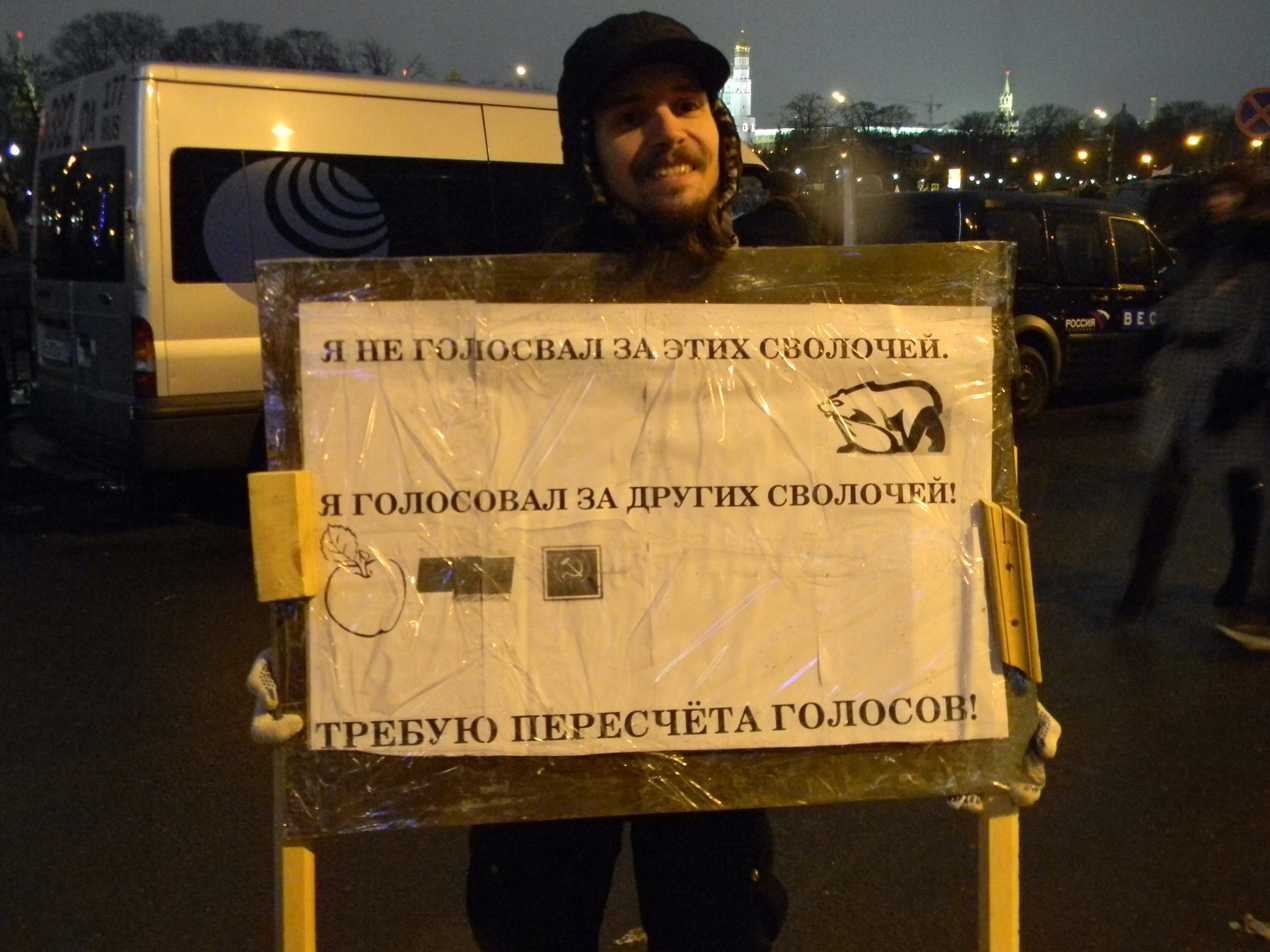
Protester in Bolotnaya Square, 10 December. The sign says, "I did not vote for these bastards (United Russia mocking logo), I voted for other bastards (Yabloko, Spravedlivaya Rossiya, CPRF logos). I want votes re-counted."

While particular demands were not apparent in the first few days of the protests, by 10 December they had coallesced into five main points:

1. Freedom for political prisoners
2. Annulment of the election results
3. The resignation of Vladimir Churov, head of the election commission, and an official investigation of vote fraud
4. Registration of the opposition parties and new democratic legislation on parties and elections
5. New democratic and open elections

==== Speakers on Bolotnaya Square ====
Various politicians and celebrities addressed the crowd, including:

- Boris Akunin, writer
- Yevgenia Albats, journalist, The New Times magazine
- Dmitrii Bykov, writer
- Yevgeniya Chirikova, politician, ecologist, opposition supporter
- Mikhail Delyagin, politician, former chairman of the Rodina party
- Gennady Gudkov, politician, A Just Russia party
- Oleg Kashin, journalist
- Mikhail Kasyanov, politician, The Other Russia opposition coalition
- Yevgeny Kopyshev, Union of Soviet Officers, Communist Party of the Russian Federation called for restoration of Soviet power but was booed off the stage.
- Konstantin Krylov, politician, head of the nationalist Russian Social Movement
- Eduard Limonov, writer and politician, head of the National Bolshevik Party (demonstrated and spoke first at the Revolution Square)
- Sergey Mitrokhin, politician, head of the Yabloko party
- Boris Nemtsov, politician, The Other Russia
- Noize MC, rapper, opposition activist
- Oleg Orlov, human rights activist, chairman of the civil rights society "Memorial"
- Dmitry Oreshkin, politologist, supported the Union of Right Forces
- Leonid Parfyonov, former news anchor, former chief editor of the Russian edition of Newsweek
- Grigory Yavlinsky, politician, founder and former head of the Yabloko party

==== Other cities ====
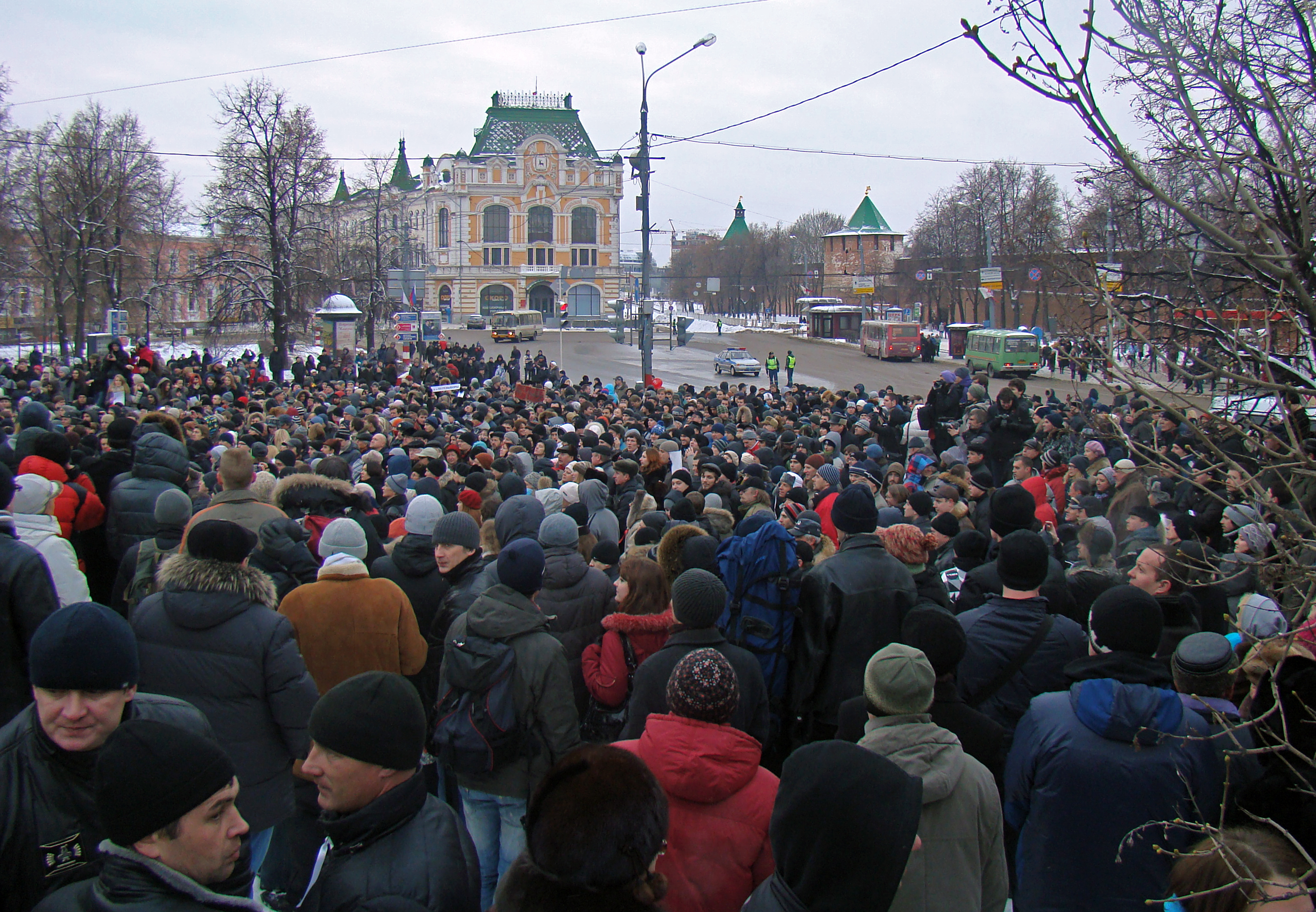
Nizhny Novgorod, Minin and Pozharsky Square. Rally against the official results of the Russian legislative election 2011.

Like in Moscow, protests were planned to take place in St. Petersburg, Vladivostok and Kaliningrad, as well as 88 other towns and cities in Russia. Smaller protests were reported in Tomsk, Omsk, Arkhangelsk, Murmansk, Yekaterinburg, Novosibirsk, Krasnoyarsk, Kurgan, Perm, Karelia, Khabarovsk, Kazan and Nizhny Novgorod.

At least 10,000 protesters turned out in St. Petersburg, 3,000 in Novosibirsk, whilst 4,000 others rallied in Yekaterinburg. At least 1,000 people rallied in the port city of Vladivostok on Russia's Pacific coast.

"Sympathy protests" are also being held abroad. In London, the former parliamentary aide accused of being a Russian spy Katia Zatuliveter turned up holding a banner saying: "Russian vote 146 per cent fair".

Some sources report only 100 arrests nationwide on 10 December due to the protests, mostly outside Moscow, which is a significantly smaller number than previous protests. In Kazan, however, at least 100 protesters, mainly in their early 20s, were detained for failure to disperse.

=== 17–18 December 2011 ===
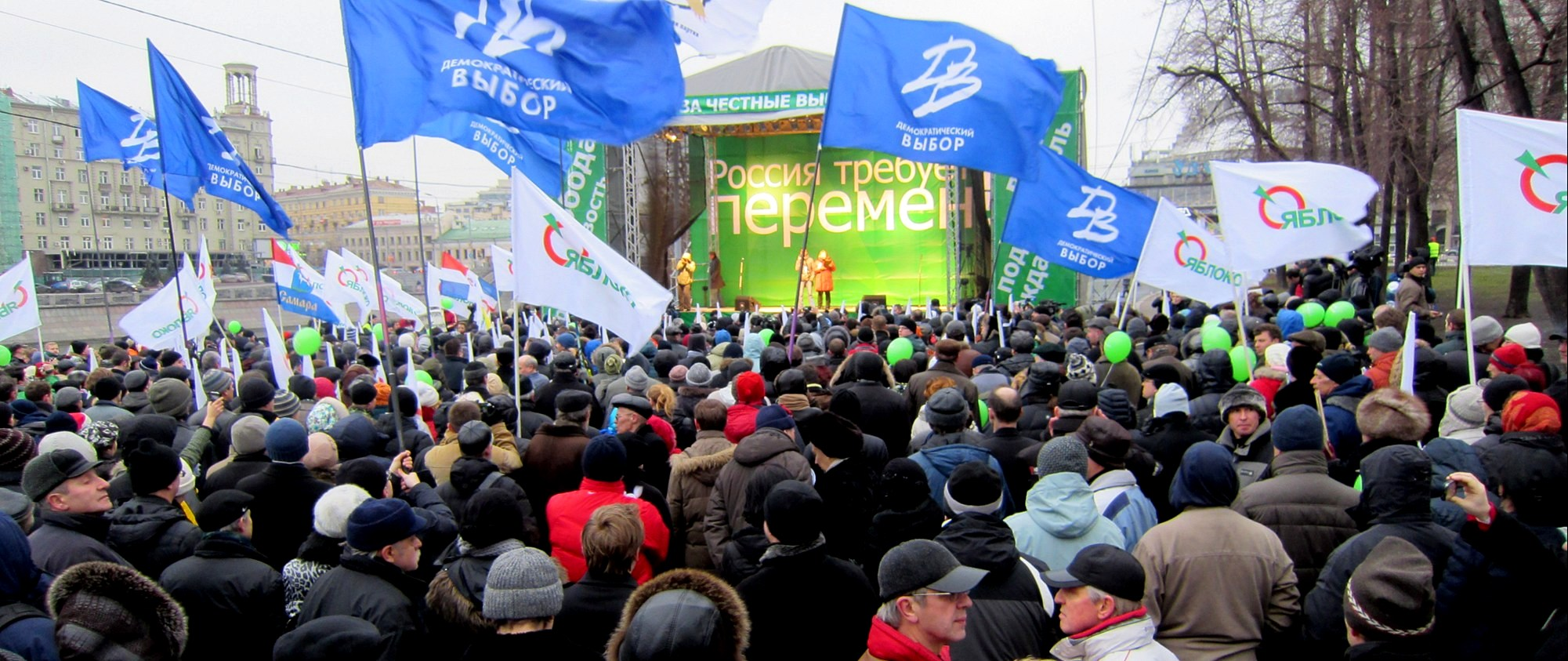
Yabloko party meeting at Bolotnaya Square, Moscow, 2011-12-17

On 17 December another meeting was held at Bolotnaya Square in Moscow against the election fraud. The rally was organised by Yabloko but members of other political parties participated as well. Among the speakers were Grigory Yavlinsky and Sergey Mitrokhin from Yabloko and Vladimir Ryzhkov from the People's Freedom Party. The Moscow Police claimed there were 1500 demonstrators but eyewitnesses claimed there were up to 5000 people at the peak of the demonstration. In any case, the turnout was far below that of the multi-party rally of 10 December.

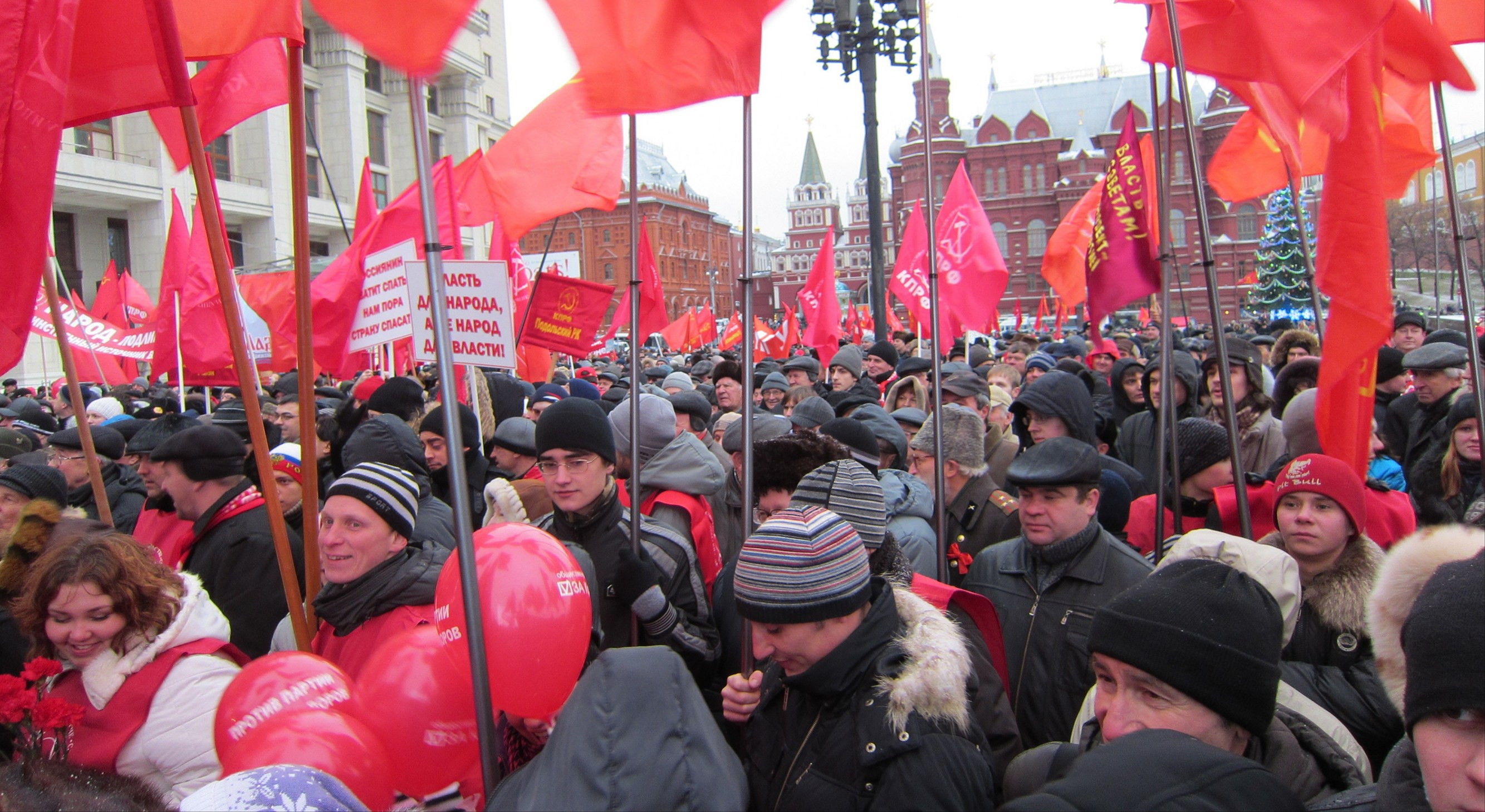
Communist Party of the Russian Federation meeting at Manezhnaya Square, Moscow, 18 December 2011

A rally was held on 18 December in Moscow, organised by Communist Party of the Russian Federation in Moscow and took place at Manezhnaya Square. Several thousand supporters turned out, but many were elderly.

Another smaller rally took place in Saint Petersburg at Pionerskaya Square.

Gennady Zyuganov, head of the party and its candidate for President of Russia, has denounced election regularities but has also expressed his opposition to the organisers of the mass demonstrations who he views as ultra liberals who are exploiting unrest.

=== 24 December 2011 ===
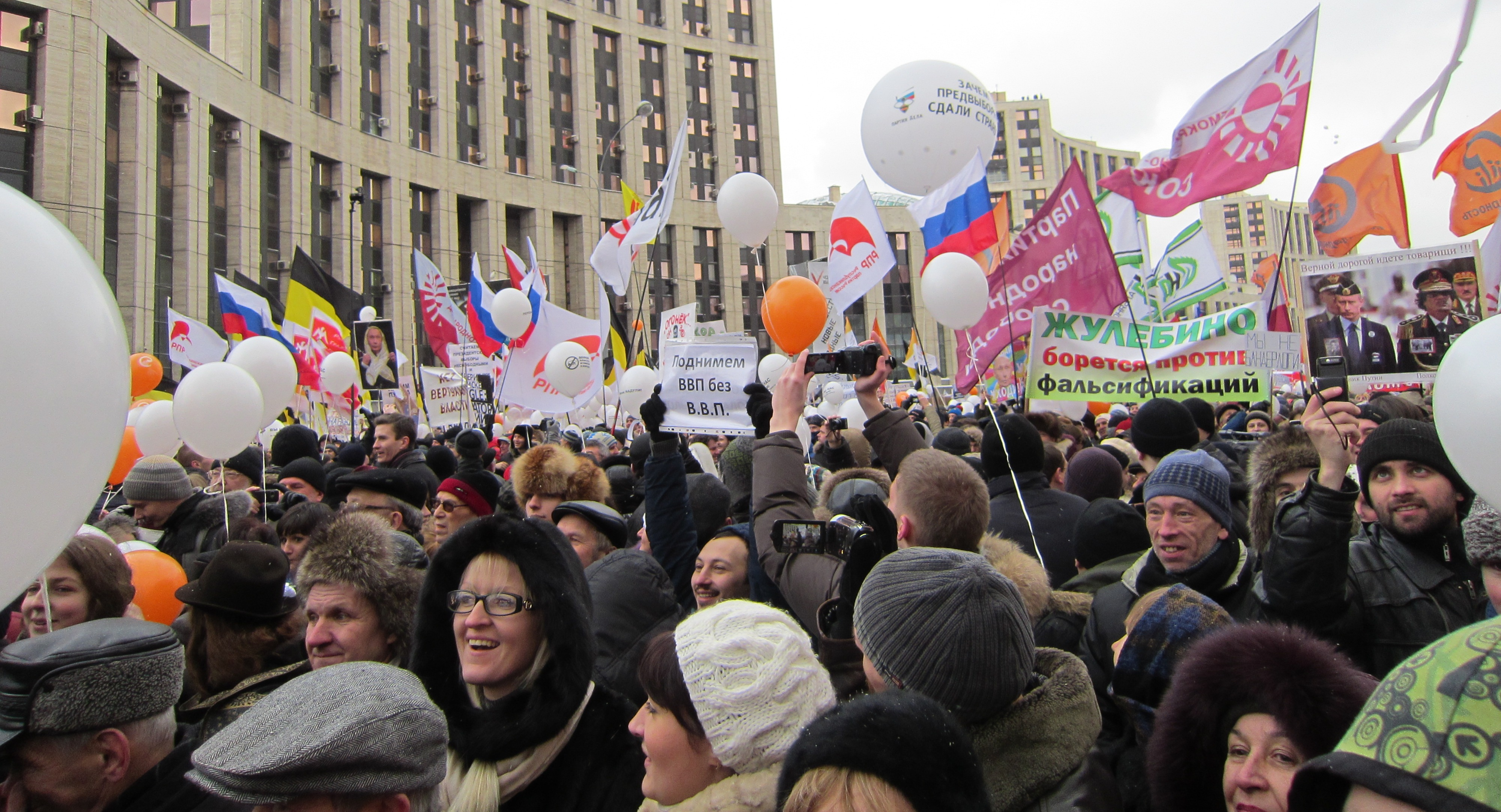
Moscow rally 24 December 2011, Academician Sakharov Avenue.

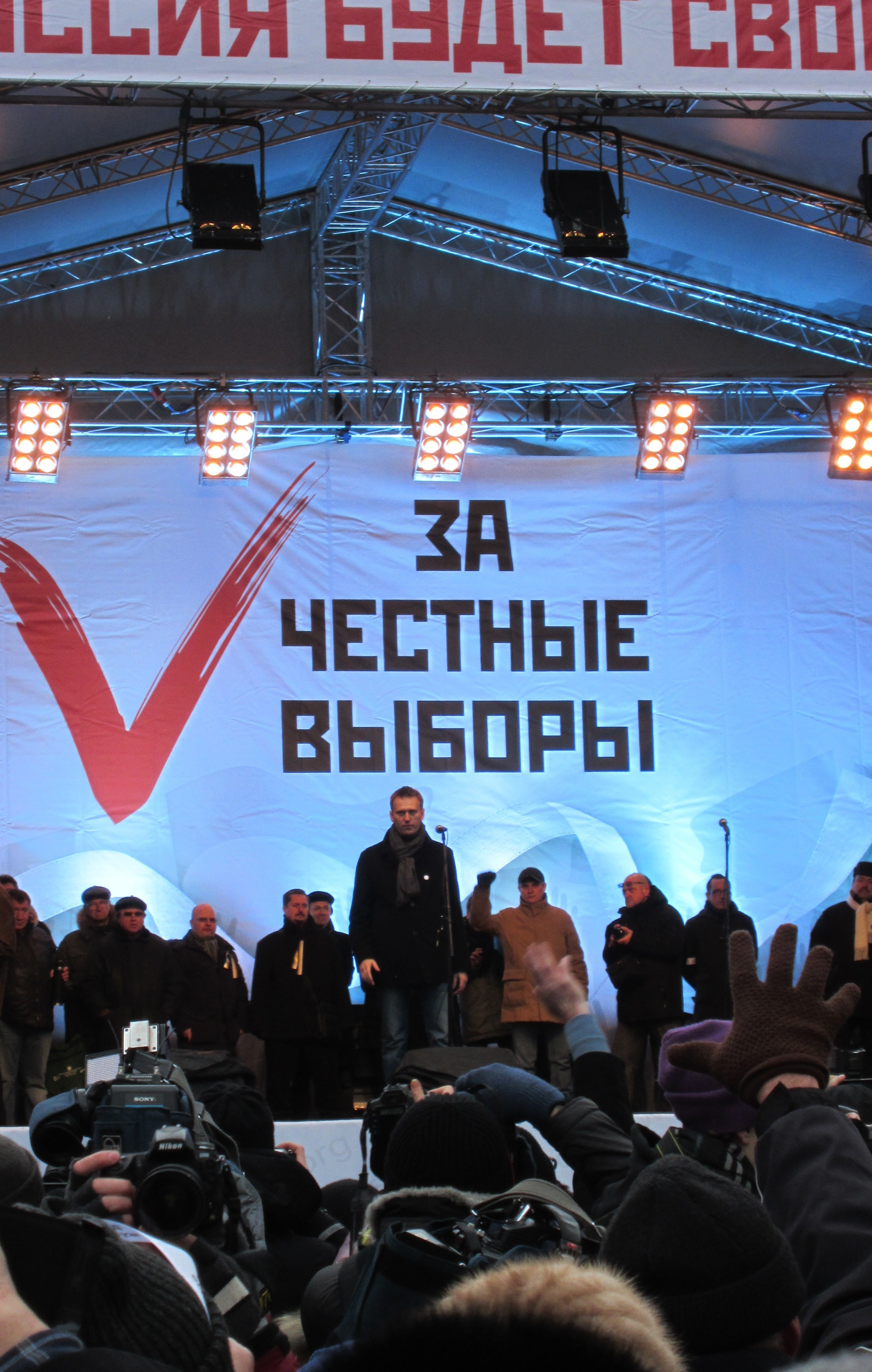
Alexei Navalny speaks at Moscow rally 24 December 2011, Academician Sakharov Avenue. Slogan "For Fair Elections"

There were large follow-up demonstrations 24 December including a rally "For Fair Elections" at Academician Sakharov Avenue in Moscow. There were rallies in Vladivostok, Novosibirsk, Orenburg, Chelyabinsk, Saratov, Nizhny Novgorod and two in Saint Petersburg.

A podium was built at the end of the 700-metre (0.43-mile) avenue. On the podium were slogans, "Russia will be free" and "This election Is a farce."

The atmosphere was peaceful but at least 40 bus loads of riot police were standing by as thousands of protesters demonstrated, with a total of up to 50,000 expected to arrive during the day. Alexei Kudrin, a former Putin insider, spoke advocating dialogue. He was booed by some, but cheered by others.

At least 21,000 protesters were in Moscow by 11:10 am GMT, according to Itar Tass, and there were at least 100 arrests in Vladivostok. According to on scene reporters, the atmosphere was fun, with white ribbons and balloons and condom-themed banners – a mocking reference to Vladimir Putin saying he believed the white ribbons, the protest movements symbol, were to promote safe sex.

The Interior Ministry estimated that at least 28,000 people had turned up, whilst some in the opposition claimed 120,000 protesters were in Moscow. Reporters of the Moscow Times said the figure was well above the 30,000 to 60,000 at the previous event and that there were about 80,000 protesters who came to this rally. The infographics from RIA Novosti shows that the Sakharov Avenue can provide room for a maximum of 96,000 people at a density of 35 people per 10 sq m, or for 55,000 people at a smaller and more realistic density distribution.

Alexei Navalny, greeted with a ovation when he finally spoke, said there were enough people present at the protest to march to and overrun the Kremlin, but that they were committed to remaining peaceful, at least for the moment.

I can see that there are enough people here to seize the Kremlin and the White House right now. We are a peaceful force and will not do it now. But if these crooks and thieves try to go on cheating us, if they continue telling lies and stealing from us, we will take what belongs to us with our own hands. ... These days, with the help of the zombie-box, they are trying to prove to us that they are big and scary beasts. But we know who they are. Little sneaky jackals! Is that right? Is that true or not?

The crowd reportedly included liberals, anarchists, communists, nationalists and monarchists.

Mikhail Gorbachev did not attend or speak but sent a message of support. On the day of the rally, the former Soviet president called on Putin to resign.

Mikhail Prokhorov, the billionaire independent presidential candidate, was in the crowd but did not speak.

==== Speakers on Sakharov Avenue ====
- Liya Akhedzhakova, actress
- Boris Akunin, author
- Dmitrii Bykov, poet
- Yevgeniya Chirikova, activist
- Alexey Gaskarov, activist
- Mikhail Gelfand, biologist
- Garry Kasparov, activist
- Mikhail Kasyanov, politician
- Alexey Kortnev, musician
- Konstantin Kosyakin, activist
- Konstantin Krylov, activist
- Alexei Kudrin, politician
- Grigory Melkonyants, activist
- Alexei Navalny, activist
- Boris Nemtsov, politician
- Vasya Oblomov, musician
- Leonid Parfyonov, journalist
- Ilya Ponomarev, politician
- Vladimir Posner, journalist
- Olga Romanova, journalist
- Vladimir Ryzhkov, politician
- Victor Shenderovich, writer
- Yuri Shevchuk, musician
- Vasily Shumov, musician
- Kseniya Sobchak, socialite
- Vladimir "Tor" Kralin, activist
- Artemy Troitsky, journalist
- Sergei Udaltsov, activist
- Anastasia Udaltsova, activist
- Vasily Utkin, journalist
- Ilya Yashin, activist
- Grigory Yavlinsky, politician
- Vladimir Yermolaev, activist

Speakers have been arranged by Alexei Navalny, Garry Kasparov, Boris Nemtsov, and Vladimir Tor, based on the principle of representation of different political forces. The last speaker was Grandfather Frost who wished everyone a "Happy New Year".

=== Nemtsov phone conversations controversy ===
On 19 December, Lifenews.ru news portal published a recording of phone conversations ascribed to Boris Nemtsov, the leader of PARNAS People's Freedom Party, and one of the main organisers of the demonstration on Bolotnaya square on 10 December. According to one of the recordings, which were called by Nemtsov himself "partially authentic, partially montaged and partially fake", he considers protesters "lemmings" (Russian: "хомячки"), "timid penguins" from Facebook and Vkontakte social networks, and claims he is "forced to represent" these people. In other recordings, he used profanities and referenced to the sexual life of some other leaders of the demonstration. He also called another prominent leader of protests, Alexei Navalny "a specialist of manipulating the internet mob". Nemtsov later apologised to several leaders he characterised in these conversations, but not to protesters, and claimed that people that made recordings available to the public committed a crime. Lifenews.ru claimed at least 3 million visitors coming to the site during the day, and the site was not accessible for some time.

=== 4 February 2012 ===
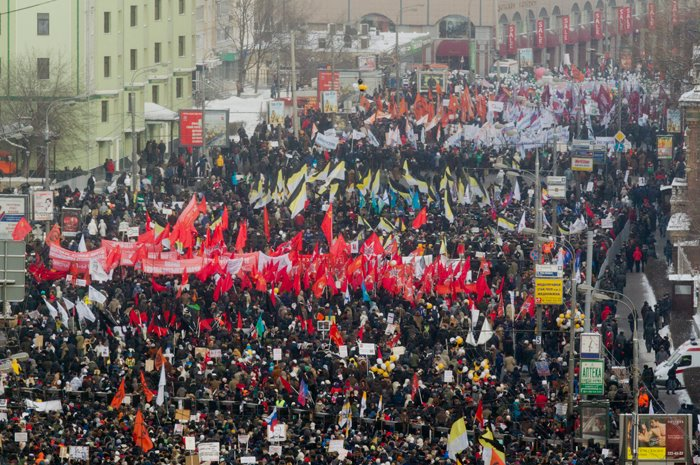
Protesters march on Yakimanka street, Moscow, 4 February.

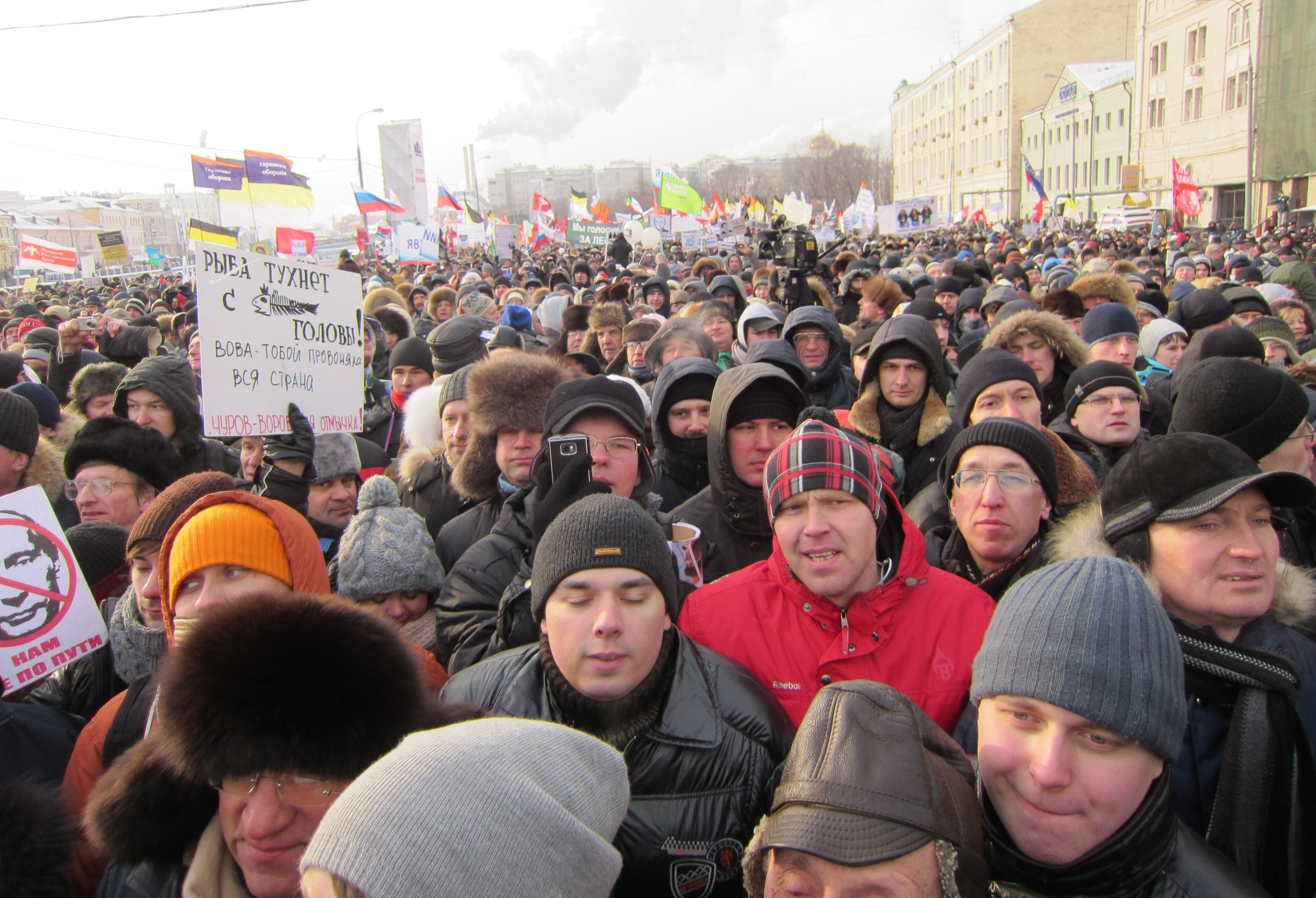
Protesters at Bolotnaya Square, Moscow, 4 February.

Despite temperatures of −20 degrees Celsius a third demonstration was carried out in Moscow by the For Fair Elections movement on 4 February, with 160,000 participants according to organisers or 38,000 participants according to the police. According to the state-run Ria Novosti's calculations, the Bolotnaya Square site provides room for a maximum of 101,000 people at a maximum density of 35 people per 10 sq m on the quay and 15 people per 10 sq m in the park, or for 53,000 people at a smaller and less compact density distribution.

This time the demonstration started with a march from Kaluzhskaya Square to Bolotnaya Square where a meeting was held. The anti-Putin protesters carried white balloons and were wearing white ribbons.

Among the speakers were Yevgeniya Chirikova, Gennady Gudkov, Leonid Parfyonov, Olga Romanova, Vladimir Ryzhkov, Sergei Udaltsov, Ilya Yashin and Grigory Yavlinsky. The meeting was ended by Yuri Shevchuk who sang his famous song "Rodina" (Motherland). The same day demonstrations were being held in other cities throughout Russia such as St Petersburg, Kazan, Kaliningrad, Nizhni Novgorod, Penza and Yaroslavl. Also the Russian-speaking population of other countries organised rallies worldwide with similar demands: Germany, Israel, USA.

The organisers of the third Moscow "For Fair Elections" protest had difficulties originally financing the protest because contributions from the public had waned by January 2012, so they financed the organisation of the protest with money collected earlier for other events.

During February 2012, when residents of the Siberian city of Barnaul were denied a permit for a street protest, they ingeniously circumvented the restriction by staging a demonstration with toys such as teddy bears, Lego figures, and toy soldiers holding signs denouncing electoral corruption. The photos of these rebellious figurines quickly spread across Russia, prompting others to replicate the protest. Faced with an awkward dilemma, Putin's government decided to ban the toy protests, asserting that toys, not being Russian citizens, were ineligible to participate in public gatherings, as explained by a government official.

=== 26 February 2012 ===
At least 3,500 people demonstrated against Vladimir Putin in St Petersburg, under heavy police presence, but no arrests were made. In Moscow on Sunday 26 February up to 30,000 people lined the Garden Ring in a protest called the Big White Circle. White clothes and white ribbons were worn as protestors formed a nine-mile human chain holding a white banner. The event was described as an apolitical "act of unity" to avoid the official permission which protests require.

=== 5 March 2012 ===
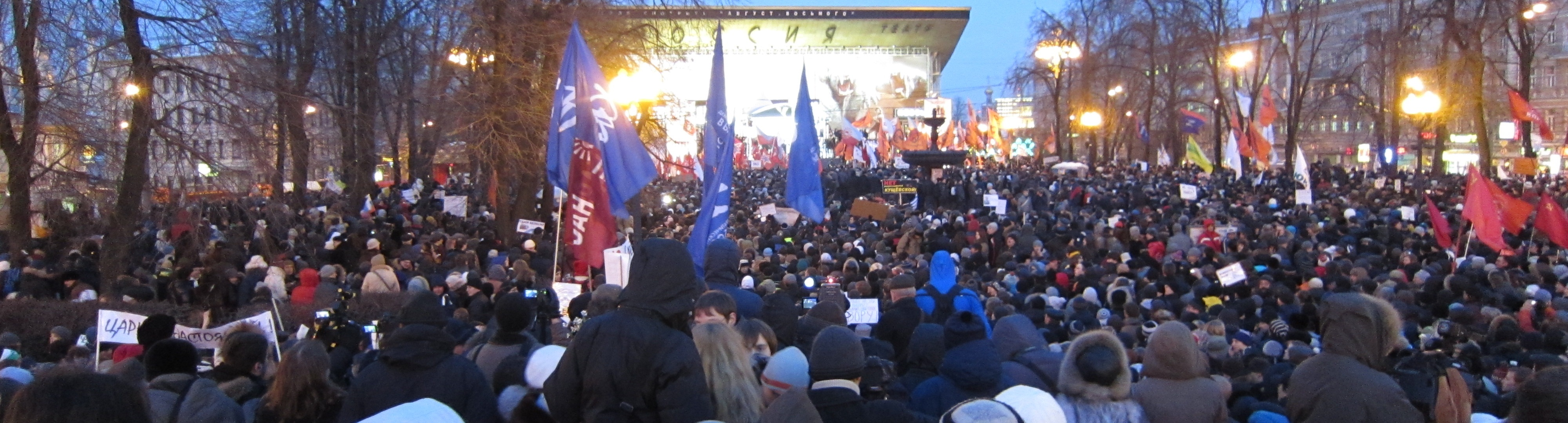
Moscow rally 5 March 2012 at Pushkin Square

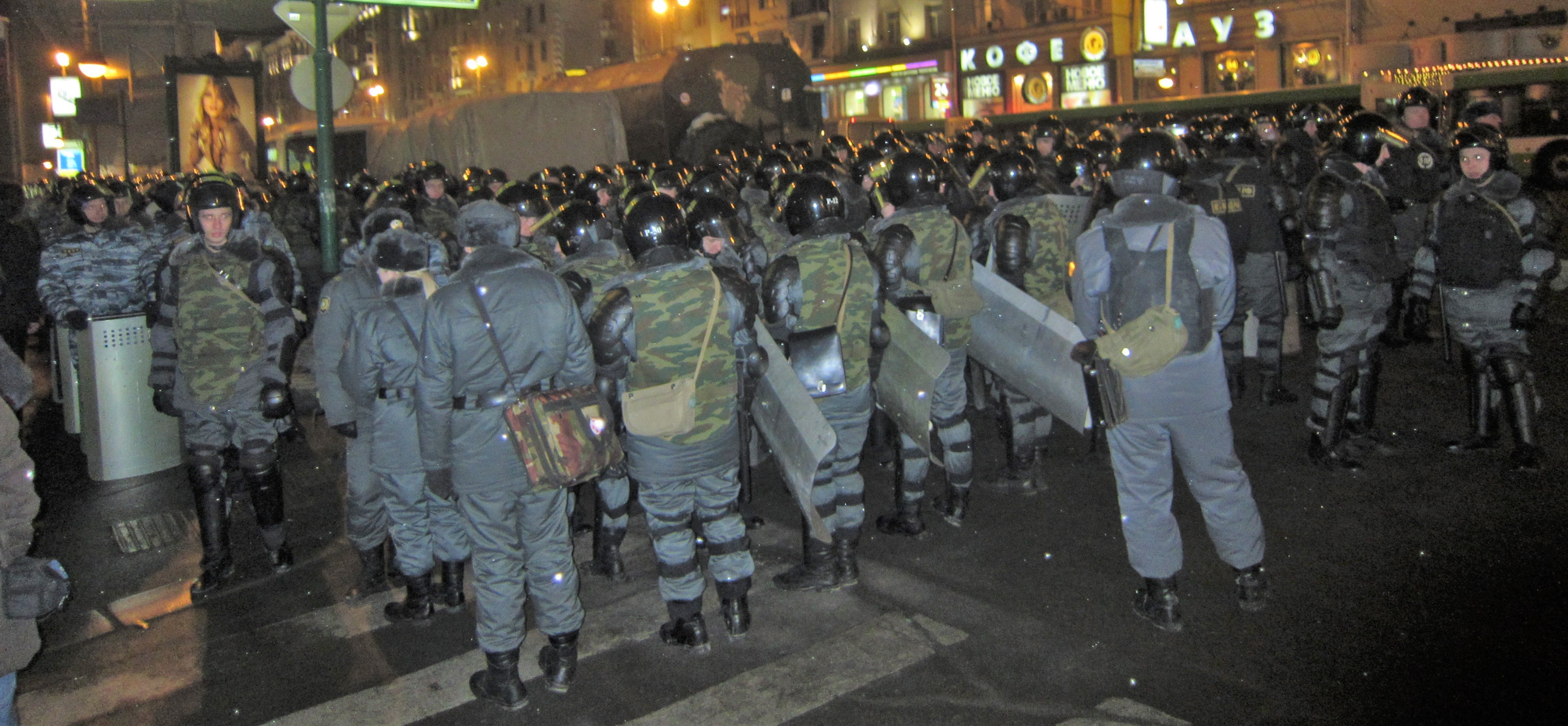
Moscow rally 5 March 2012 at Pushkin Square: police forces shifted to the Pushkin Square

In response to Vladimir Putin's reelection during the Presidential Elections, protesters took to the streets of Moscow. After being denied to demonstrate on Lubyanka Square up to 25,000 people protested in Pushkin Square. A couple of thousand protestors stayed behind and clashed with riot police who moved in to disperse them, leading to several hundred arrests, including Alexei Navalny, Sergey Udaltsov and Ilya Yashin. Anti-government protests also took place in St Petersburg too, albeit smaller, at 3,000 people where 300 were arrested.

=== 10 March 2012 ===
Another "For Fair Elections" protest was staged on the Novy Arbat street in Moscow. A permit was issued for 50,000, but just 25,000 came according to the organisers and 10,000 according to the police. The mood was downbeat after Putin won an absolute majority everywhere but Moscow where he garnered 46.95% of the vote. Sergei Udaltsov of Left Front, called for a massive demonstration 1 May, but no further protests are scheduled.

=== 18 March 2012 ===
Up to 1000 protesters gathered at an unsactioned demonstration at the Ostankino television tower and 94 were arrested. They were protesting against a documentary called The Anatomy of Protest, which had been shown on 15 March on NTV, a channel owned by Gazprom, a state-run firm. The documentary claimed that protesters against the election of Putin as president had been given "money and cookies" as payment. It also claimed that Alexei Navalny, a well-known opposition blogger, had been "spreading misinformation" and had "too many bodyguards" who were "beating up journalists". Protesters wore white ribbons and chanted "Shame on NTV!"

=== 8 April 2012 ===
For the first time since the beginning of the protests, opposition activists were allowed onto Red Square to demonstrate, though they were not allowed to pitch a tent. Just the previous weekend protesters were barred from the square and arrests made. This time, "hundreds" gathered, including Yevgenia Chirikova and Sergei Udaltsov.

=== Astrakhan mayoral election of 2012 ===
After fraud was alleged in the mayoral election of 2012 in Astrakhan and the United Russia candidate was declared the winner, organisers of the 2011–2012 Russian protests supported the defeated candidate, Oleg V. Shein of Just Russia, in a hunger strike. Substantial evidence of fraud was cited by the protesters but an official investigation failed to find significant violations. The activists from Moscow found it difficult to gain traction over the issue with local residents who, like most Russians, accept political corruption as a given that is useless to protest. The emissaries from Moscow persisted, buoyed by celebrities who support the reform movement, drawing 1,500 to a rally on 14 April.

=== 6 and 7 May 2012 ===
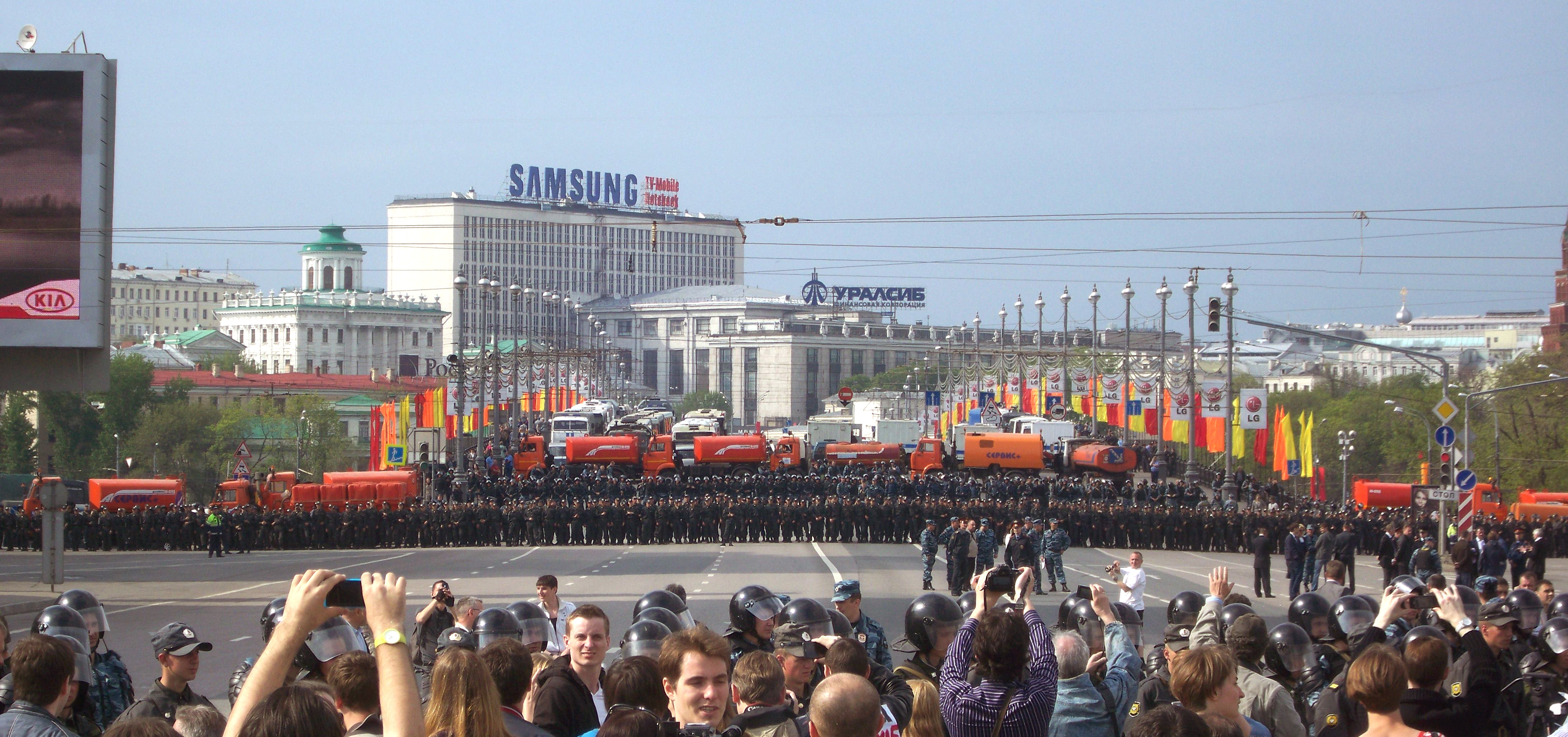
The police cordons on Bolshoy Kamenny Bridge 6 May 2012

Protests involving about 20,000 people took place in Moscow the day before Putin's inauguration as President for his third term. Some called for the inauguration to be scrapped. About 400 protesters were arrested by the police, including Alexei Navalny, Boris Nemtsov and Sergei Udaltsov and 80 were injured. On the day of the inauguration, at least 120 protesters were arrested in Moscow. Police also detained over 100 young men of conscription age (18–27), including 70 who had avoided the military draft.

From the very beginning, the so-called "March of Millions" was a nervous event. Even before the march, many large liberal media sites: Echo Moscow radio station, Kommersant daily, and TV Rain channel, were subjected to DDoS-attacks. Ilya Ponomarev, an opposition leader and member of parliament, said the police had started the clashes. "The police started it. Bolotnaya square filled up and the police sealed it off. when they started to push demonstrators, and people reacted," he said. Prime Minister Vladimir Putin's press secretary, Dmitry Peskov said he believed the police were being too soft on the protesters. Gazeta.ru reported "The efforts that the law enforcement are going to in order to provoke the protesters are so evident, it's impossible to remain blind to the plan of radicalization of peaceful protests behind their actions."

Several hundreds meetings continued on 6/7 night, 7, 7/8 night and 8 May in different places in Moscow. Opposition leaders were arrested again. The arrests continued in the following months. The authorities' crackdown on the pro-democratic movement resulted in what has come to be known as the "Bolotnaya square case".

=== Opposition Coordination Council ===
Due to the fractured nature of the opposition, in June 2012 activists decided to create a 45-member Opposition Coordination Council (OCC), which would try to coordinate and direct dissent in Russia.

Elections for the council were held on 20–22 October 2012. 170,000 people had registered on the site cvk2012.org, of whom nearly 98,000 were classed as "verified" and nearly 82,000 had cast their votes.

Most votes were cast for Alexei Navalny.

=== 12 June 2012 ===
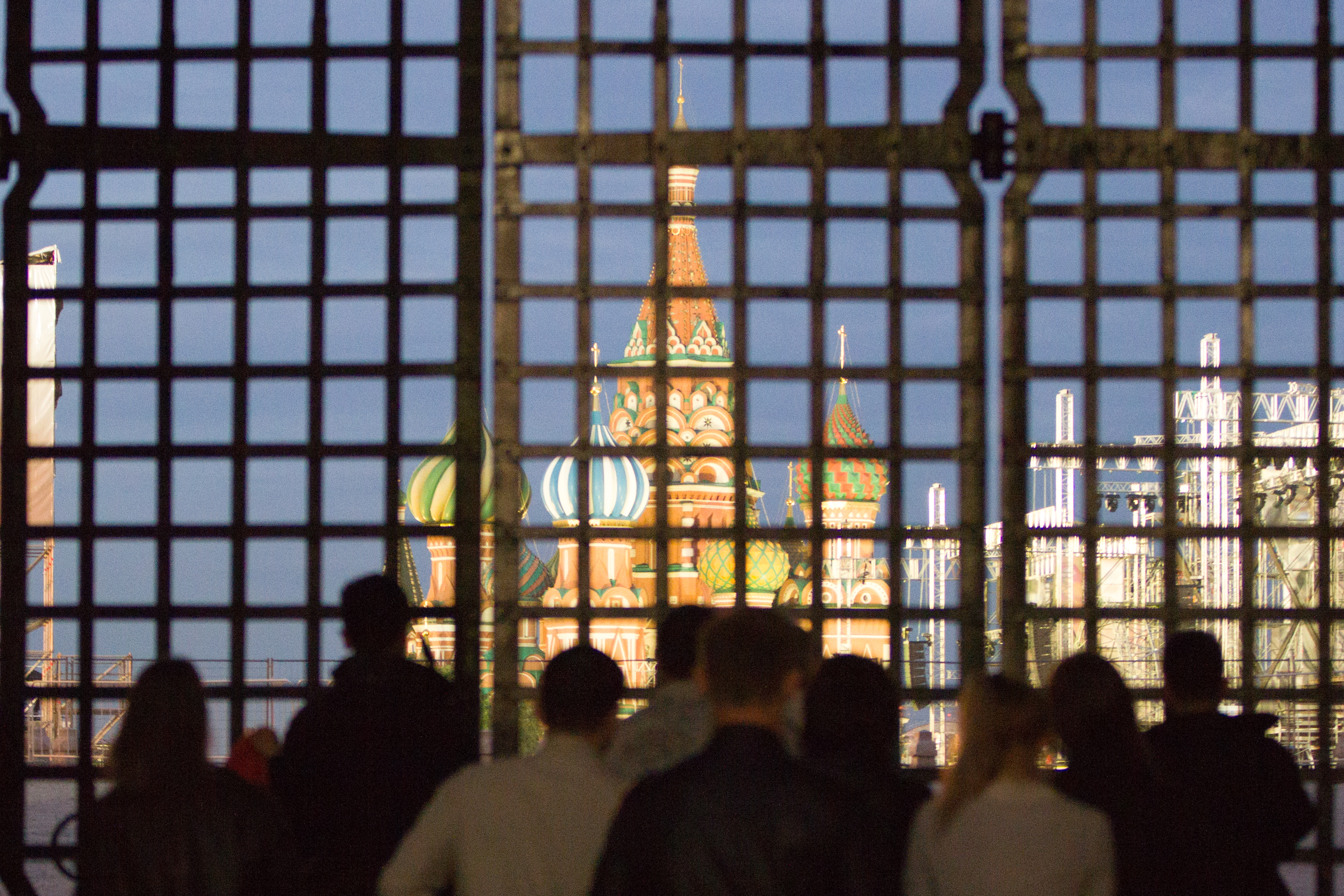
Red Square was closed during the days of and leading to 12 June protest

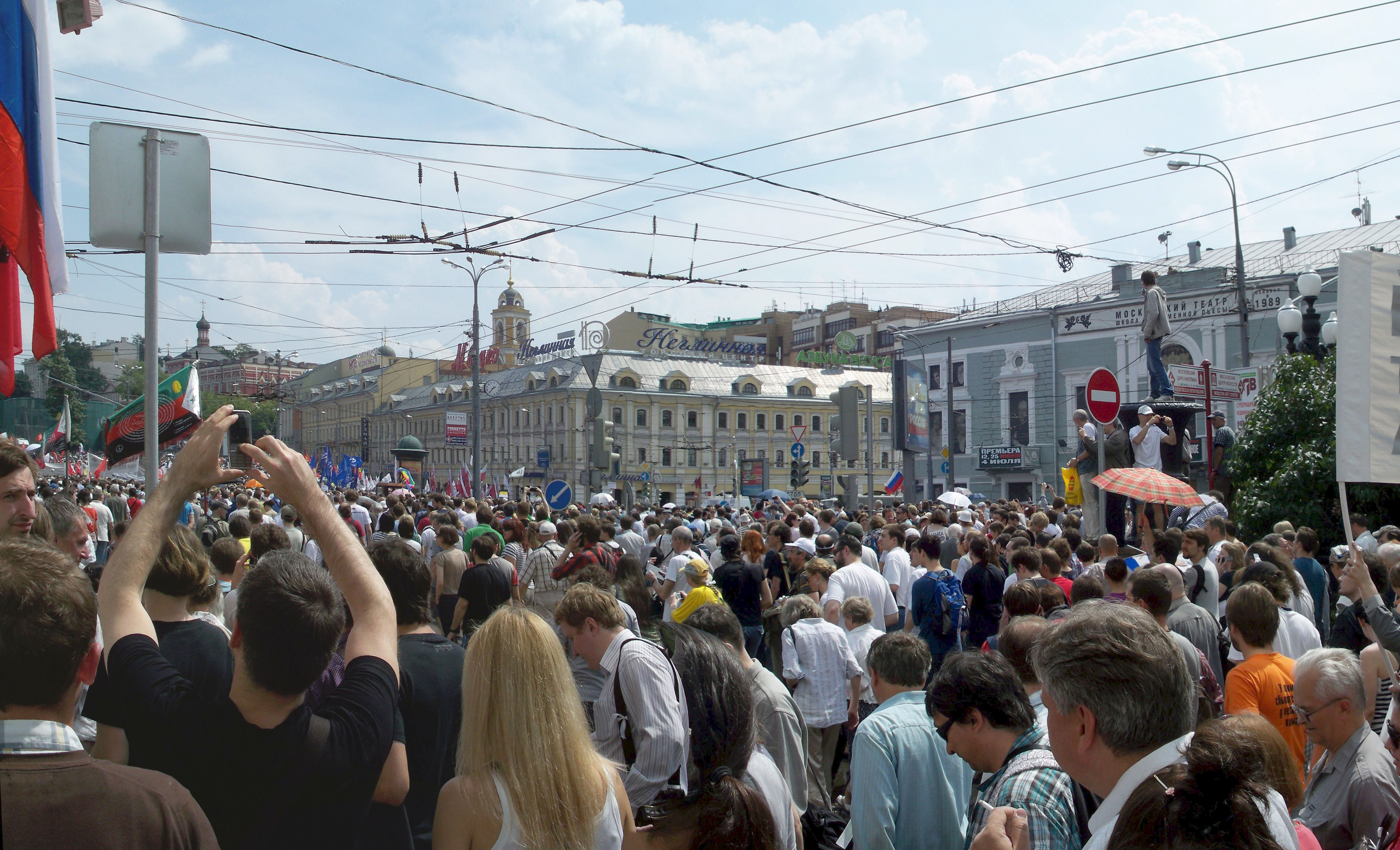
Moscow rally 12 June 2012

A peaceful protest rally by tens of thousands, protest organisers estimated their numbers at 50,000, while police put it at 15,000, originating at Pushkin Square was held in Moscow on 12 June 2012, Russia Day. The rally was preceded by soaking rain; there was a thunderstorm after a few hours. Protest activities fell within the conditions of the permit which had been issued by the authorities. A call by Sergei Udaltsov to march on the Investigative Committee of Russia which had raided organisers' homes on 11 June was rejected by other protest organisers. The protest rally defied an atmosphere of intimidation and repression fostered by the Putin administration: The previous day, police had raided the homes of various opposition leaders and called them in for interrogation an hour before the protest was due to start on 12 June: Alexei Navalny, Ilya Yashin and Ksenia Sobchak all attended the interrogations. The rally was also the first to follow a new law passed in June 2012 to punish protesters with larger fines. Participation in the protest was diverse, united only by opposition to Putin; in addition to the revolutionary anti-capitalist Left Front led by Sergei Udaltsov, black-clad Russian nationalists and liberals sporting white ribbons participated despite expressing mutual disdain.

=== 15 December 2012 ===
On Saturday afternoon about 2,000 protestors gathered in Lubyanka Square in Moscow, the location of the headquarters of the Federal Security Services, a successor to the KGB. A requested permit to lay flowers at the memorial stone in the square was denied. There were mass arrests including Alexei Navalny, Sergei Udaltsov of the Left Front, Kseniya Sobchak, and Ilya Yashin. Those arrested, if prosecuted and convicted, face heavy fines under recently enacted legislation which outlaws organising or participating in unauthorised demonstrations.

=== 13 January 2013: March Against Scoundrels ===
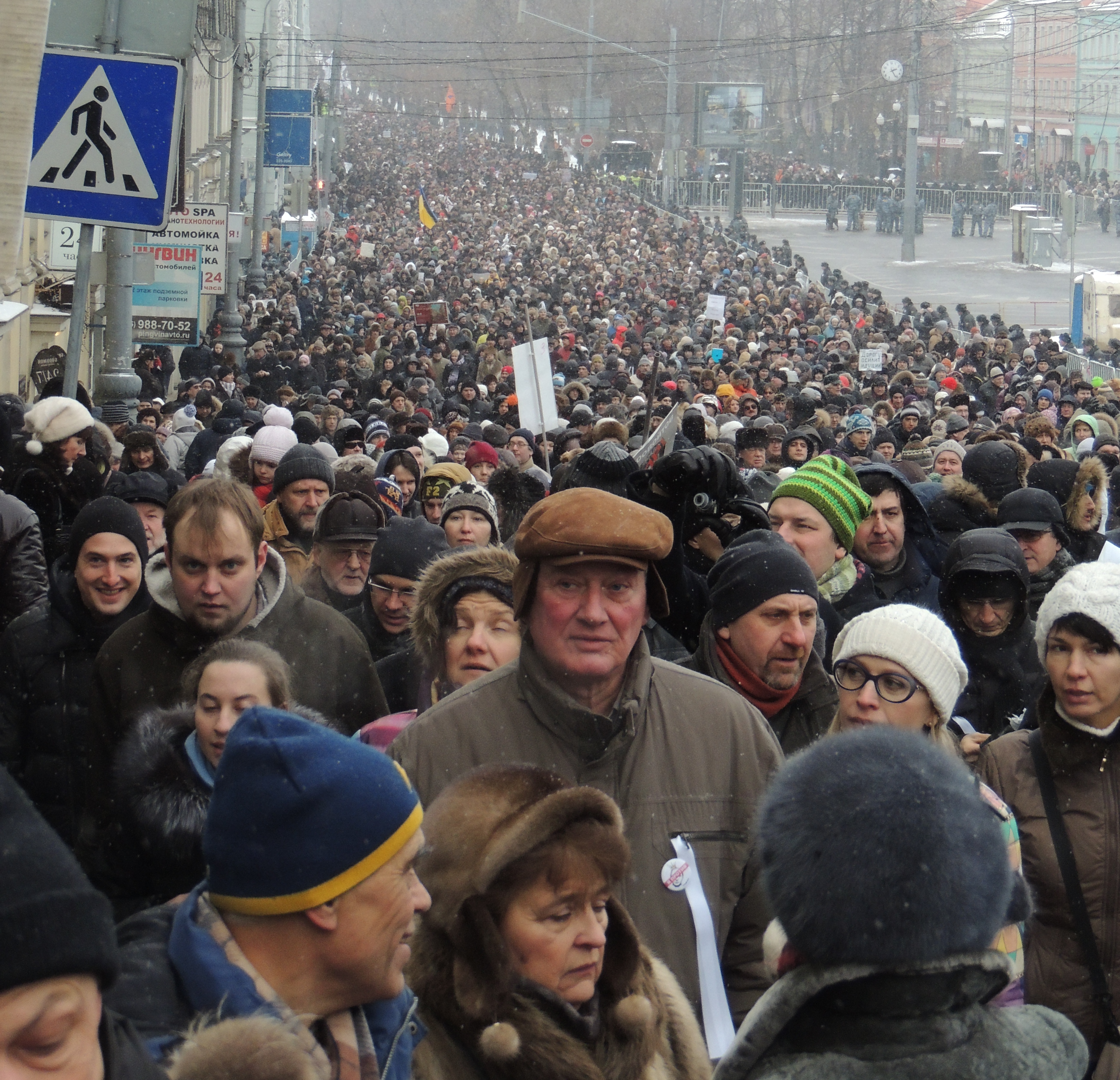
March Against Scoundrels

On 13 January 2013 a protest called the "March Against Scoundrels" was held in Moscow protesting passage of the Anti-Magnitsky law, a sanctions framework targeted at United States citizens that additionally bans adoption of Russian children by people in the United States. A permit was sought and issued. According to the police there were about 10,000 participants.

According to oppositioners counting there were from 30 to 50 thousand people. According to bloggers' counting – 24,474 participants.

=== 6 May 2013 ===
On 6 May 2013 a mass rally took place in Moscow. Among featured speakers were Boris Nemtsov and Alexei Navalny. Opposition leaders put the number of attendants at up to 50,000, though police stated 7,000 took part.

=== 18 July 2013 ===
On 18 July 2013 Alexei Navalny was sentenced to five years in prison for alleged embezzlement. After the verdict was read, thousands gathered in Moscow's Manezhnaya Square to protest it.

== Rallies in support of the government ==
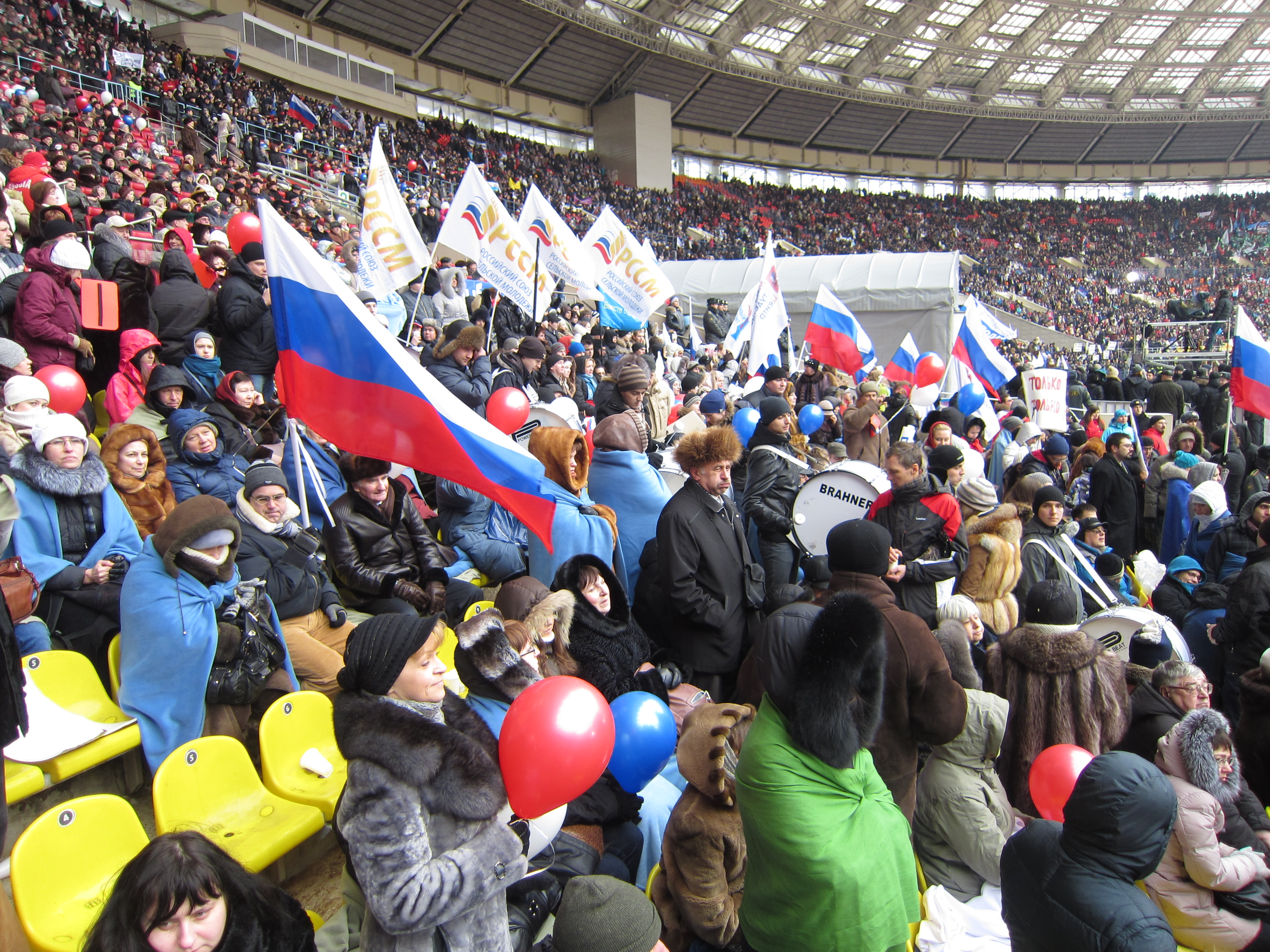
Putin supporters on 23 February Luzhniki rally.

Simultaneously with the anti-government protests, the government and United Russia were supported by rallies of the government funded youth organisations.

=== 4 December 2011 ===
On 4 December, Nashi took to the Moscow streets with 15,000 young people that had been brought to Moscow from more than 20 regions and held meetings and concerts on the Revolution Square and Manezhnaya Square to express their support of president Medvedev and prime minister Putin.

=== 6 December 2011 ===
On 6 December, about 5,000 activists from Nashi and other pro-Kremlin youth groups held pro-government rallies on Manezhnaya Square and Triumfalnaya Square. To a New York Times reporter, it seemed that many of the participants in the rally were forced to attend.

=== 12 December 2011 ===
On 12 December, the 18th anniversary of the Constitution of Russia, thousands of United Russia sympathisers demonstrated in Moscow in support of Putin.

=== 23 February 2012 ===
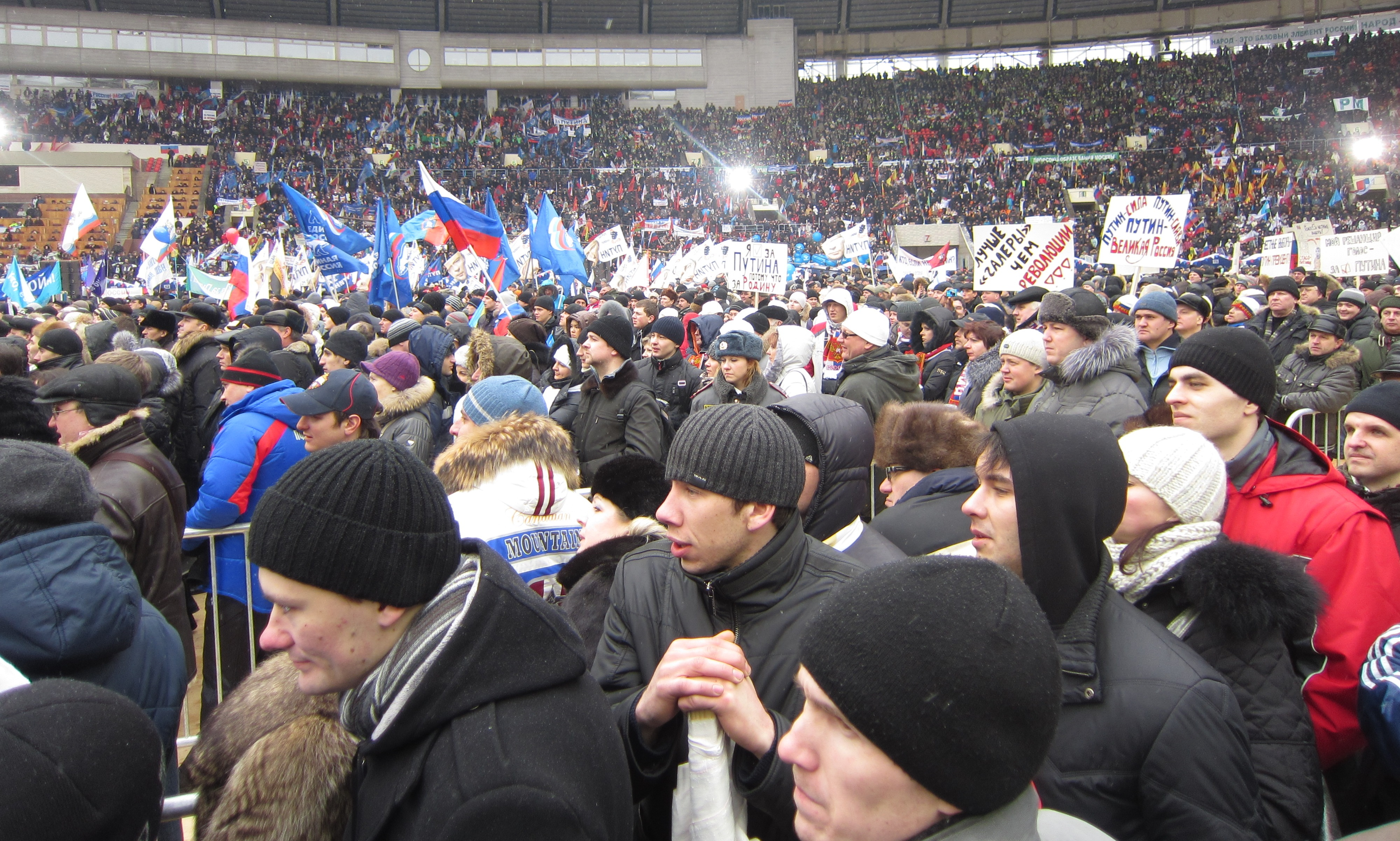
Pro-Putin concert at Luzhniki Stadium: public at the stadium field. Placards with slogans: "I'm for Putin as I'm for the Motherland!", "Putin – Power, Putin – Glory, Putin – Great Russia!"

On 23 February, Russia's Defender of the Fatherland Day, a massive pro-Putin march took place in Moscow. The march ended in Luzhniki Stadium, where a crowd of 130,000 (according to police estimates) was addressed by Vladimir Putin. The BBC reported, however, that some attendees claimed they had been made to take part or paid. Some said they had been told they were attending a "folk festival". After Putin spoke, popular folk band Lubeh took to the stage.

Putin's speech in Luzhniki was his single speech before such a large audience during 2012 presidential campaign. In the speech he called not to betray the Motherland, but to love her, to unite around Russia and to work together for the good, to overcome the existing problems. He said that the foreign interference into Russian affairs should not be allowed, that Russia has its own free will. He compared the political situation at the moment with the First Fatherland War of 1812, reminding that its 200th anniversary and the anniversary of the Battle of Borodino would be celebrated in 2012.Putin cited Lermontov's poem Borodino and ended the speech with Vyacheslav Molotov's famous Great Patriotic War slogan "The Victory Shall Be Ours!" ("Победа будет за нами!").

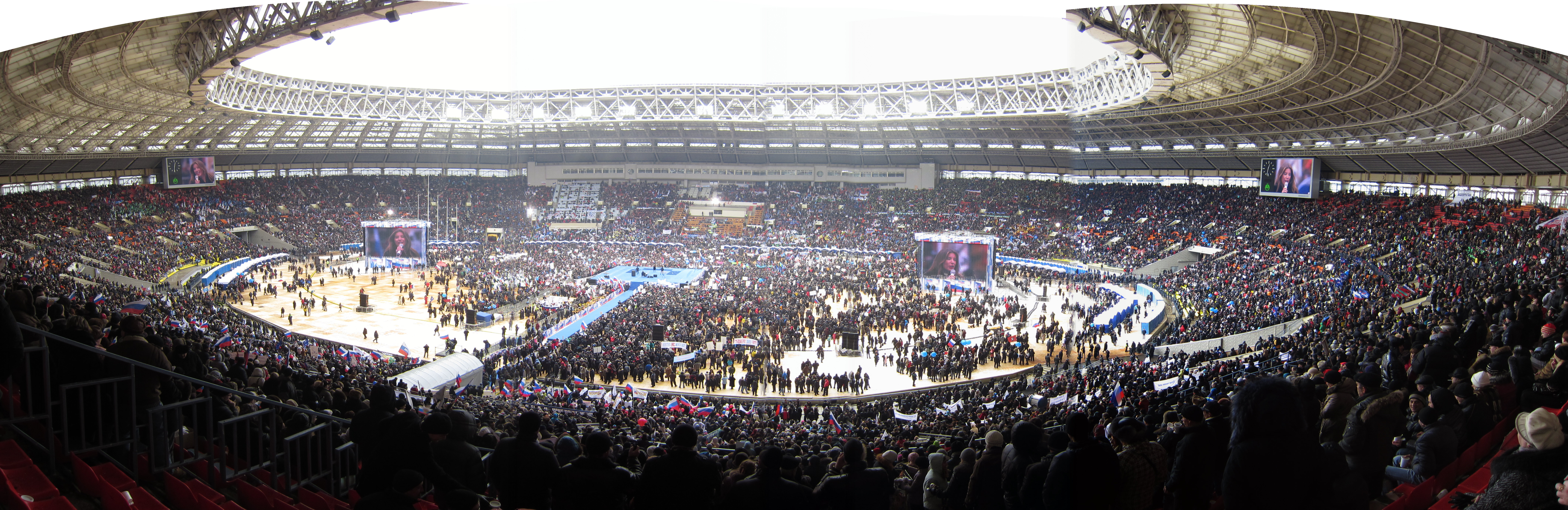
Panorama of the Luzhniki rally

=== 4 March 2012 ===
On the post-election rally of his supporters at Manezhnaya Square, while making an acceptance speech, Putin was for the first time ever seen with tears in his eyes (later he explained that "it was windy").

== Anti-Orange protests ==
=== 24 December 2011 ===
On 2 December on Sparrow Hills, Sergey Kurginyan and his movement "Sut' Vremeni" (Essence of Time) organised the first protest against what was viewed as "orange" protesters in Moscow. The protest also supported the slogan "For Fair Elections".

=== 4 February 2012 ===
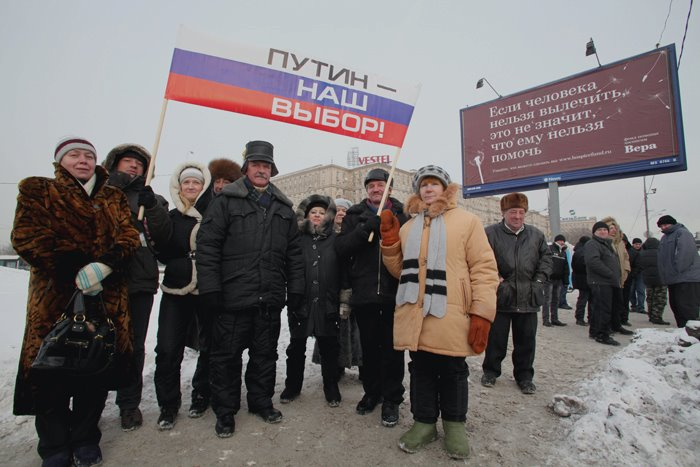
Demonstrators with the "Putin – Our Choice" banner

Alongside smaller rallies that gathered 50,000 people throughout the rest of the country, the large "Антиоранжевый митинг" ("Anti-Orange protest") was held on Poklonnaya Hill in Moscow, near the World War II memorial complex, the largest protest action of all the protests so far according to the police. It was organised by a number of public organisations: Patriots of Russia party, Kurginyan's "Sut' Vremeni", "Congress of Russian communities", "Regional public fund in support of the Heroes of the Soviet Union and Heroes of Russia" "Trade Union of Russian citizens", "Pensioner Union of Russia", "Russian Union of Afghanistan veterans", "Assistance to realisation of constitutional rights of citizens 'Human rights'" group and others.

According to the Moscow police, 138,000–150,000 people participated at the protest at the peak of attendance, while more people could have passed through the site. Opposition groups disputed these figures "as grossly inflated", and some journalists, including one of the state-owned news agency RIA Novosti, said the real number was "much lower". The infographics from Ria Novosti shows that the Poklonnaya Hill site can provide room for a maximum of 193,000 people at a density of 35 people per 10 sq m, or for 117,000 people at a smaller and more realistic density distribution. Some demonstrators, many of whom were state employees, said they attended under threat of dismissal. Some such claims made in the course of the protest organisation were later refuted as falsifications by the opposition activists and many other demonstrators said they came on their own free will according to a pro-government news site politonline.ru. Vladimir Putin acknowledged that some attendees could have been coerced, but said that it was impossible to gather so many people by administrative pressure alone.

The participants were mostly middle age, but there were many young and old persons. Some of the participants were bused from other regions and cities with the transport provided by organisations participating in the action. At a temperature of −21 °C, a number of heat guns were set up, as well as tents with free hot tea and confectionery.

The resulting large attendance at the protest was not expected, and resulted in a traffic jam in a nearby Kutozovsky Avenue. The organisers of the protests applied to the Moscow authorities to gather 15,000 people, but since the number was exceeded, they were faced with paying a fine. Vladimir Putin, who earlier in the evening claimed to share the ideals of those who would go to Poklonnaya Hill, offered to pay part of the fine with his own money.

The "anti-Orange protest" name alludes to the (November 2004 – January 2005) Orange Revolution in Ukraine, the most ill-known to Russians colour revolution. The term "orange" in Russian political discourse has highly negative connotations. The speakers declared to be against "orangeism", "collapse of the country", "perestroika" and "revolution", reminding the public of such historical events as Gorbachev's Perestroika and the 1917 Russian Revolution and urging never to repeat them. The call for fair elections was supported, but the leaders of protesters on Bolotnaya Square and Sakharov Avenue were condemned as "successors to those who destroyed the country in 1991 and 1917" and who allegedly want "to remove not Putin, but the Russian state". The visit of anti-government protest leaders to the U.S. embassy was condemned, as well as the alleged American interference.

Pop-rock singer and composer Denis Maydanov performed on the scene, and pop-rock group Diskoteka Avariya sang their popular song "The Evil Approaches".

The symbol of the "anti-Orange protest" was an orange snake strangled in a fist. The motto of the protest was "Нам есть, что терять!" (We have things to lose). The top slogan chosen by online vote was "Не дадим развалить страну!" (Won't allow collapse of the country!) and among those frequently used were "Мы за стабильность" (We are for stability) and "Когда мы едины и мы непобедимы!" (When we are united we are invincible!).

==== Speakers on Poklonnaya Hill ====
- Sergey Kurginyan, politologist, theatre director, TV host
- Maksim Shevchenko, journalist, TV and radio host
- Tatiana Tarasova, coach to more world and Olympic champions than any other coach in figure skating history
- Anatoly Wasserman, political pundit, a frequent winner of intellectual TV games
- Nikolay Starikov, writer, opinion journalist
- Mikhail Leontyev, journalist and politologist
- Valentin Lebedev, journalist, leader of the "Union of Orthodox citizens"
- Natalya Narochnitskaya, historian, politologist
- Eduard Bagirov, writer, scenarist
- Johan Bäckman, Finnish, political author, legal sociologist and criminologist
- Pavel Popovsky, leader of the "Union of airtroopers of Russia"
- Aleksandr Dugin, philosopher, politologist, nationalist publicist
- Alexander Prokhanov, writer, publicist
- Yegor Kholmogorov, nationalist publicist
- Vladimir Dolgikh, World War II veteran, two times Hero of Socialist Labor, member of the State Duma

== Media coverage ==
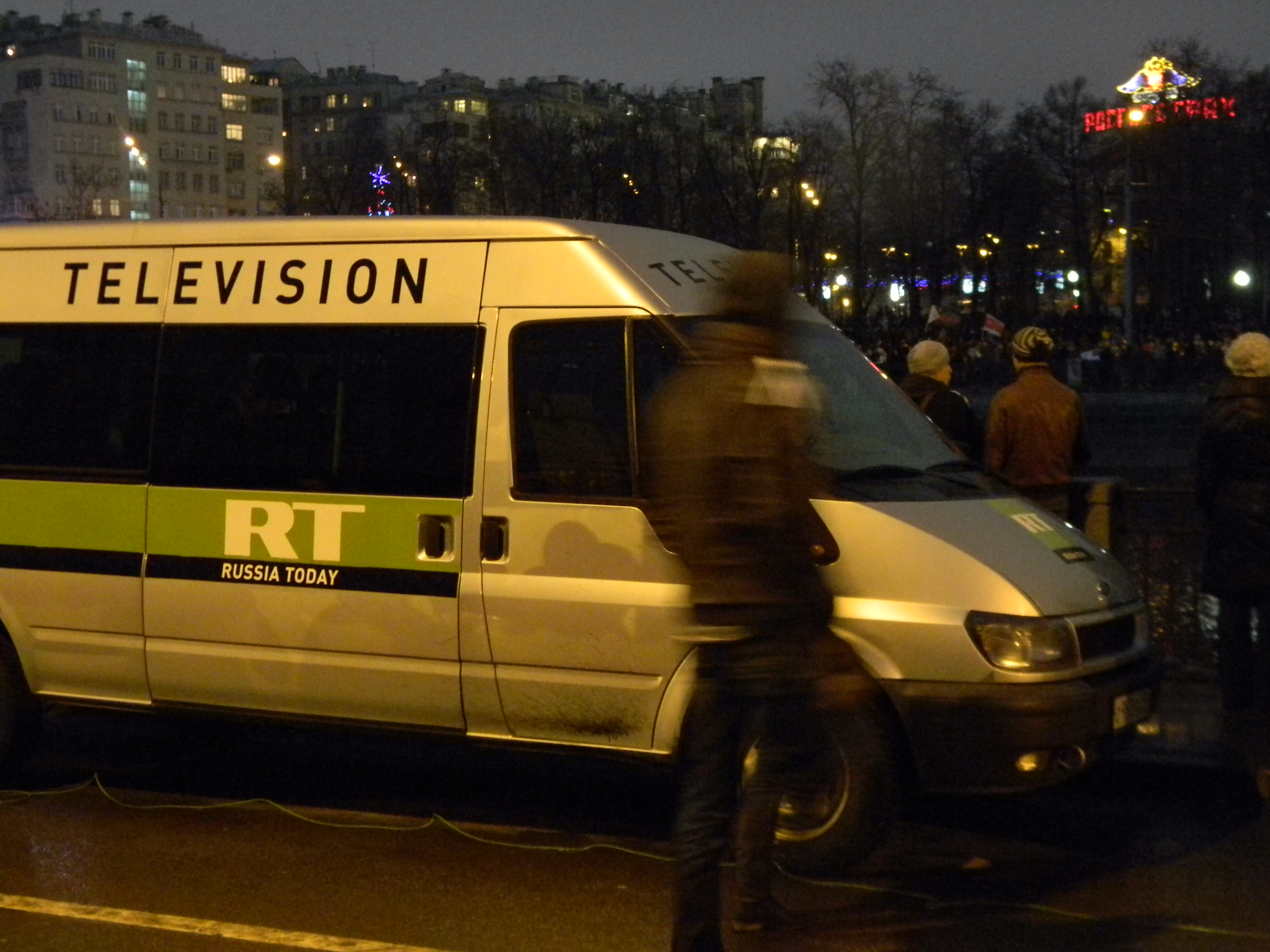
RT team covering protests in Bolotnaya Square in Moscow on 10 December 2011

According to the BBC on 7 December, "State TV channels have generally ignored the protests, covering only pro-government rallies" In contrast, newspapers have mentioned the protests in more depth. The only federal TV station to mention the protests at length before 10's December was the independent, but not broadcast widely, Ren TV.

By 10 December, however, breaking with practice in recent years, all the main state-controlled channels were covering the protests, and in a professional and objective manner. According to one Russian media Alexey Pivovarov, NTV-channel host (now tightly run state media), refused to broadcast if the protests are not covered. Later, in 2013 Pivovarov have left the NTV. Western media covered the protests extensively starting on 5 December. Initial coverage by Fox News used footage of the 2011 Athens riots, showing palm trees, people throwing Molotov cocktails at police, and signs in Greek which Fox later claimed was an error and subsequently removed the report from its site.

=== Internet ===
Twitter users in Russia have reported being overwhelmed by pro-government tweets timed to Bolotnaya Square protest-related tweets. Many tweets seem to have been sent by hijacked computers, though the perpetrator(s) are not yet known.

According to a report made by The Wall Street Journal the Russia's Federal Security Service (FSB) have made a formal request to the social media site VKontakte to block opposition groups who 'encourage people to "trash the streets, to organize a revolution". The request was declined as only a few users behaved violently and it was unjust to ban a whole generally peaceful group.

== Sites and naming of protests ==
The two largest protest actions in December 2011 took place on Bolotnaya Square (10 December) and Academician Sakharov Avenue (24 December), and another major protest action is planned on Bolotnaya on 4 February 2012. This resulted in the campaigners being dubbed the "Bolotnaya-Sakharov opposition", or taking into account the root meanings, the "swampy-sugar opposition." Former Speaker of Russia's State Duma and a leader of the United Russia party Boris Gryzlov advised Russians to "keep away of all those swamps", alluding to the phrase from the Russian film adaptation of Conan Doyle's The Hound of the Baskervilles ("As you value your life or your reason keep away from the moor" in the original book).

== Symbols ==
White ribbon, used by the "for fair elections" protesters.

The white ribbon emerged in October 2011 as a symbol of opposition and since the elections has picked up momentum. Some Russians have been tying it to their clothing, cars, and other objects, and the motif has appeared on runet and on Twitter. By 10 December, the TV Rain channel was showing a white ribbon by its on-screen logo. The station's owner, Natalya Sindeyeva, explained this as being a sign of "sincerity", rather than "propaganda", and an attempt to be "mediators" instead of simply journalists. NTV described 10 December as the day of "white ribbons".

Vladimir Putin contemptuously referred to the white ribbons used by Russian protesters, comparing them to condoms being used as a symbol of the fight against AIDS.

== Reactions ==
=== Response from Russian officials ===
President Dmitry Medvedev ordered an investigation into allegations of vote-rigging, though this received a cynical response from many opponents on his Facebook page. He also defended the right of people to express their views, while denouncing the street protests. On 22 December 2011, he called for a number of reform steps, including reintroducing the direct election of governors and reducing the required signatures for registering a political party or running in the presidential election. A bill reintroducing direct election of governors was introduced in the Duma on 16 January 2012.

At his annual question and answer TV conference Vladimir Putin answers Alexey Venediktov's question: "I'm glad that people appear who actively voice their position. I repeat, that if that is the result of 'Putin's regime', I'm glad that such people appear."

Prime Minister Vladimir Putin said that Hillary Clinton "set the tone for some opposition activists" to act "in accordance with a well-known scenario and in their own mercenary political interests <...> our people do not want the situation in Russia to develop like it was in Kyrgyzstan or not so long ago in Ukraine." Putin's spokesperson Dmitry Peskov said on 12 December that, "Even if you add up all this so-called evidence, it accounts for just over 0.5 percent of the total number of votes. So even if hypothetically you recognise that they are being contested in court, then in any case, this can in no way affect the question of the vote's legitimacy or the overall results." On 15 December 2011, Putin claimed that the organisers of the protests were former (Russian) advisors to former Ukrainian president Viktor Yushchenko during his presidency who were transferring the Orange Revolution to Russia; he also claimed some organisers were paid by "foreign powers".

On 27 December 2011, Putin reassigned Vladislav Surkov to the task of advancing Russia's modernisation and development efforts; he remains a deputy prime minister but will no longer oversee Russia's political processes. Putin suggested that a dialogue with the protestors on the internet might be productive, but while upholding the right of the protestors to protest, criticised them for lack of direction and lack of a program relevant to Russia's development, comparing them to "Brownian motion, going every which way."

Vladislav Surkov, political adviser to the Kremlin and Chief of Russian Presidential Administration, who had been developing strategies for Russia to cope with an uprising such as the Orange Revolution in Ukraine has recognised the vital nature of the demonstrators but hopes to head off development of a potentially revolutionary movement by instituting reforms such as those announced by Russian president Dmitri A. Medvedev in his state of the nation address made 21 December 2011. According to Surkov, "The system has already changed".

The rights of at least three Western television news channels (the BBC, CNN and Bloomberg) were suspended in Moscow by major provider Akado Telecom on 12 July 2012. While the move was not officially linked to the protests, but rather to outdated licences, Alexei Navalny noted that it came just three days after comments by President Putin that "Russia's policies often suffer from a one-sided portrayal these days".

=== Response from the Obama Administration ===
(United States) Jay Carney, President Barack Obama's second White House Press Secretary, said that anti-government protests in Russia are a "positive sign" for democracy in the country.

=== Other reactions ===
Mikhail Gorbachev, former president of the Soviet Union and general secretary of the Soviet Communist Party, has called on the authorities to hold a new election, citing electoral irregularities and ballot box stuffing. He criticised Vladimir Putin and the United Russia political party for violating peoples human rights and for not ruling the country in a proper Democratic fashion. During the next major round of demonstrations that occurred on 24 December, he called on Putin to resign.

== Interpretation of protests ==
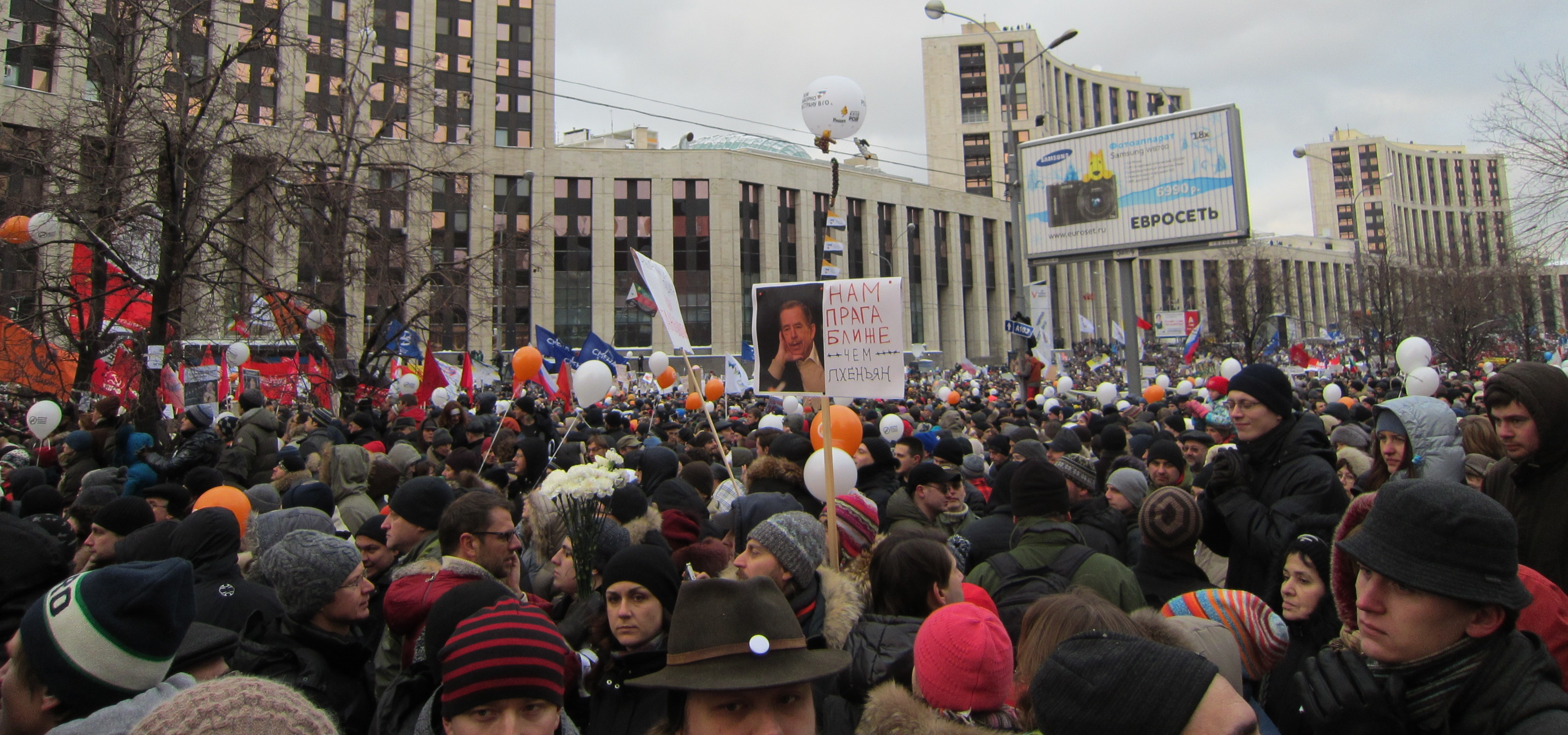
«Prague is closer to us than Pyongyang»: a portrait of former Czech President and anti-communist dissident Václav Havel

The 2011 protests were the biggest in Russia since the 1990s, and surprised many with their scale. According to Victor Shenderovich, an opposition political commentator for radio station Ekho Moskvy, "This is political, not economic. The coal miners came out because they were not paid. The people coming onto the streets of Moscow are very well off. These are people protesting because they were humiliated. They were not asked. They were just told, 'Putin is coming back.'" According to Thomas L. Friedman, The New York Times columnist this humiliation of the rising middle class is the common ground the Russian movement shares with the Arab Spring. According to The New York Times, another "explanation is the high level of public corruption [in Russia], which threatens new personal wealth. A second is a phenomenon seen in Gen. Augusto Pinochet's Chile, that economic growth can inadvertently undermine autocratic rule by creating an urban professional class that clamors for new political rights." An additional explanation is that "Putin's unilateral announcement in September that he would run again for the presidency, in effect swapping places with Mr. Medvedev" contributed greatly, something some "Russians now snidely refer to [...] as "rokirovka" – the Russian word for castling in chess".

Imprisoned oligarch Mikhail Khodorkovsky has claimed that the protests were inspired, at least in part, by the example of the Arab Spring. He told The Guardian, "We have only to reflect on the events in countries swept up in the Arab Spring to recognise the transformation taking place in the compact between the rulers and the ruled. While there are certainly many differences between those countries and Russia, there are some fundamental similarities." In March 2012 Sergei Mironov, running for the presidency of Russia, also compared the situation to the Arab Spring, saying that: "Whoever wins the presidency, if he does not immediately begin deep political and social reforms [...] Russia will be shaken by a kind of Arab Spring within two years." The Telegraph pointed out that since Mironov is a former ally of Vladimir Putin, he could have been trying to scaremonger "as a subtle way of endorsing a crackdown on street demonstrations that are expected in the days after the vote".

== Repression ==
Vyacheslav Volodin, who was Deputy Prime Minister at the time and later became First Deputy Chief of Staff of the Presidential Administration of Russia, was responsible for domestic policy and was tasked with countering the revolution and began to rein in the internet using Prisma (Russian: «Призма») which "actively tracks the social media activities that result in increased social tension, disorderly conduct, protest sentiments and extremist" by monitoring in real time the protesters discussions on blogs and social networks and performs social media tracking which later led to the establishment of the Internet Research Agency.

8 June 2012 in response to increased militancy by a segment of the protest movement a law was enacted imposing severe penalties on protesters who engage in unauthorised demonstrations or who exceed the boundaries of authorised ones. Maximum penalties were fines of several thousand rubles or imposed labour of up to 200 hours.

On 11 June 2012, the day before a scheduled protest in Moscow the homes of the prominent activists, Kseniya Sobchak, Alexei Navalny, Sergei Udaltsov and others were raided and extensively searched. Literature, electronic data, lists of supporters, and funds were seized. The activists were ordered to report to the Investigative Committee of Russia for questioning during the scheduled protest.

== In popular culture ==
All the Kremlin's Men, 2015 book by Mikhail Zygar.

Winter Go Away!, 2012 documentary/ drama film directed by Dmitriy Kubasov.

Dressed Up for a Riot: Misadventures in Putin's Moscow, a 2018 nonfiction book by Michael Idov

== See also ==
- Euromaidan
- List of protests in the 21st century
- Vyacheslav Volodin
- The Red Web by Andrei Soldatov and Irina Borogan
