= Bolotnaya Square =

Square in Moscow, Russia

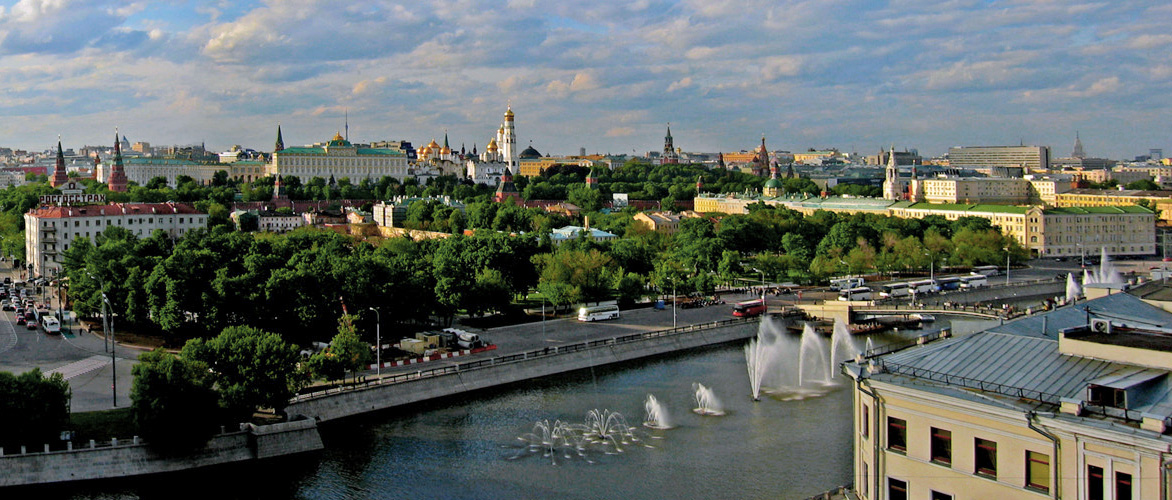
- Native name: Болотная площадь (Russian)
- Location: Moscow; Central Administrative Okrug; Yakimanka District
- Postal code: 119072
- Nearest metro station: Biblioteka Imeni Lenina; Tretyakovskaya; Polyanka; Borovitskaya
- Coordinates: 55°44′42″N 37°37′03″E

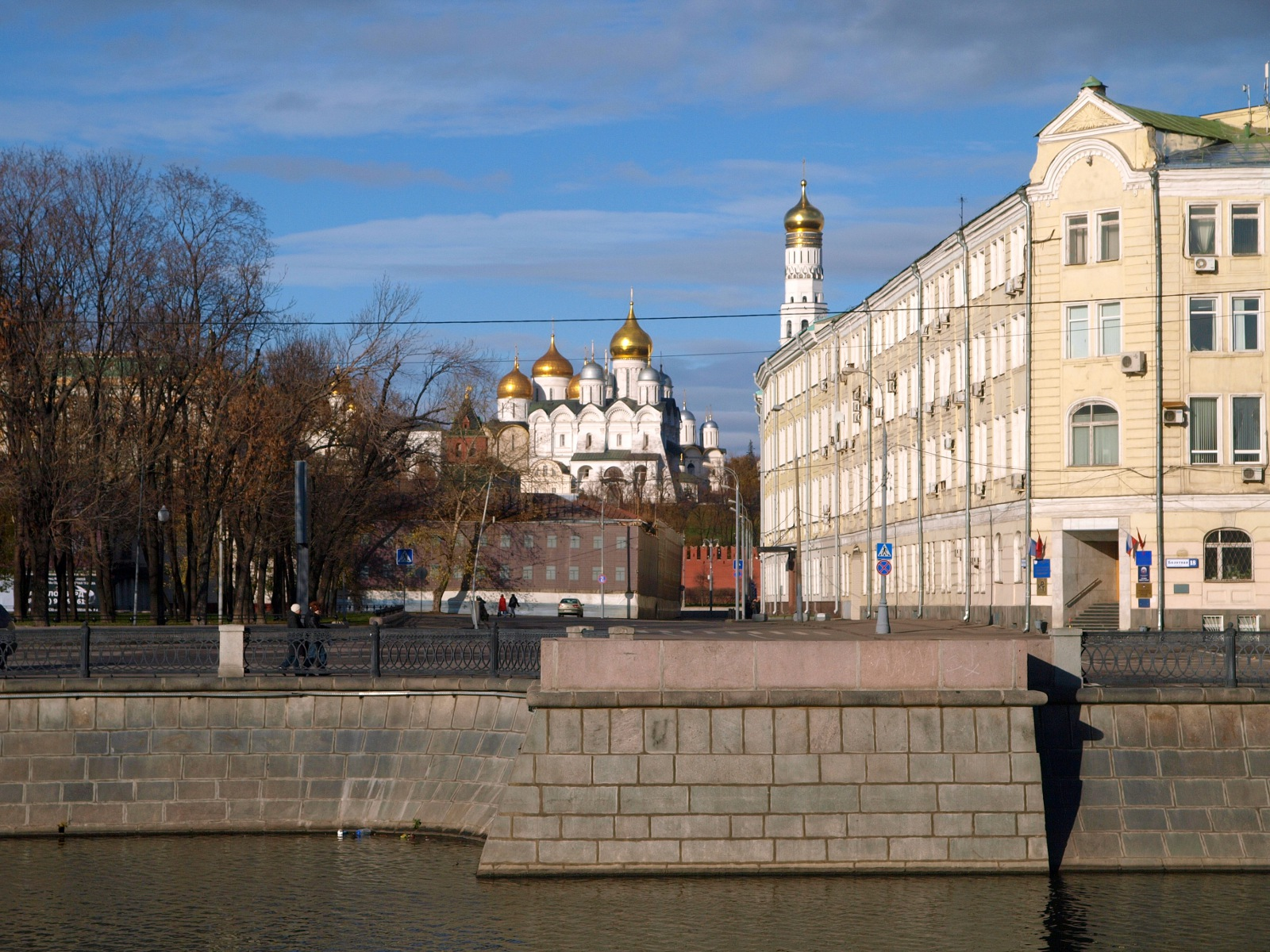
The eastern part of the square (the left side of the image), with the Kremlin looming in the distance

Bolotnaya Square (Russian: Болотная площадь, Bolotnaya ploshchad) is a square in the center of Moscow, in Yakimanka District, south of the Moscow Kremlin, between the Moskva River (north) and the Vodootvodny Canal (south). The square is bounded by Bolotnaya Embankment of the canal to the south, by Serafimovicha Street and the House on the Embankment to the west, and by Bolotnaya Street to the north and to the east. The square had the name of Repin Square, commemorating Russian artist Ilya Repin, between 1962 and 1994. The square is built as a pedestrian open space.

== History ==
The name of the area, Boloto (literally meaning the marsh), was known since the 14th century, when it was located in the meadows on the low bank of the Moscow River and frequently flooded. It belonged to the district of Zamoskvorechye, south of the river, and became an urban area much later than the left bank of the river, where the Kremlin is located.

The square was frequently used for public executions, notably, the famous rebel Stepan Razin in 1671 and Yemelyan Pugachev, a leader of a peasant rebellion, who was executed there in 1775. It was also the last public execution in the square. The area was flooded on a regular basis until the 1780s, when the Vodootvodny Canal was dug to normalize the situation.

In the 19th century, the area was built up by the addition houses and warehouses of local merchants, some of which are still intact.

In 1958, the monument to Ilya Repin was built in the center of the square. In 1962, the square was renamed Repin Square. In 1994, together with other streets and squares of the historical center of Moscow, it was renamed back to Bolotnaya Square. In 2001, the sculpture group of Children Are the Victims of Adult Vices by Mihail Chemiakin was unveiled on the square.

On 10 December 2011 several dozens of thousands protesters held a rally in the framework of 2011 Russian protests. This was the biggest rally in Moscow since the 1990s.

== Gallery ==
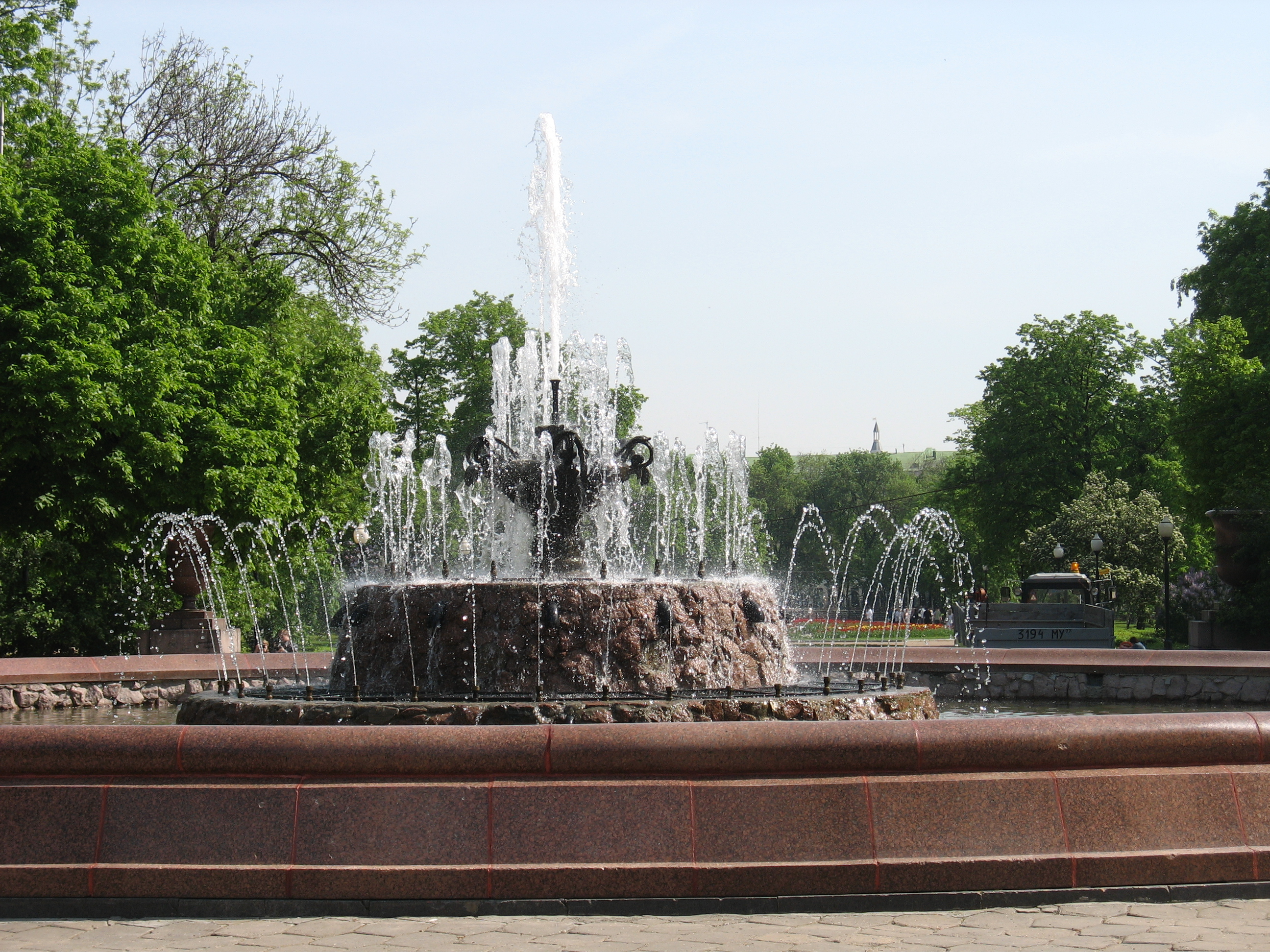
Repin Fountain

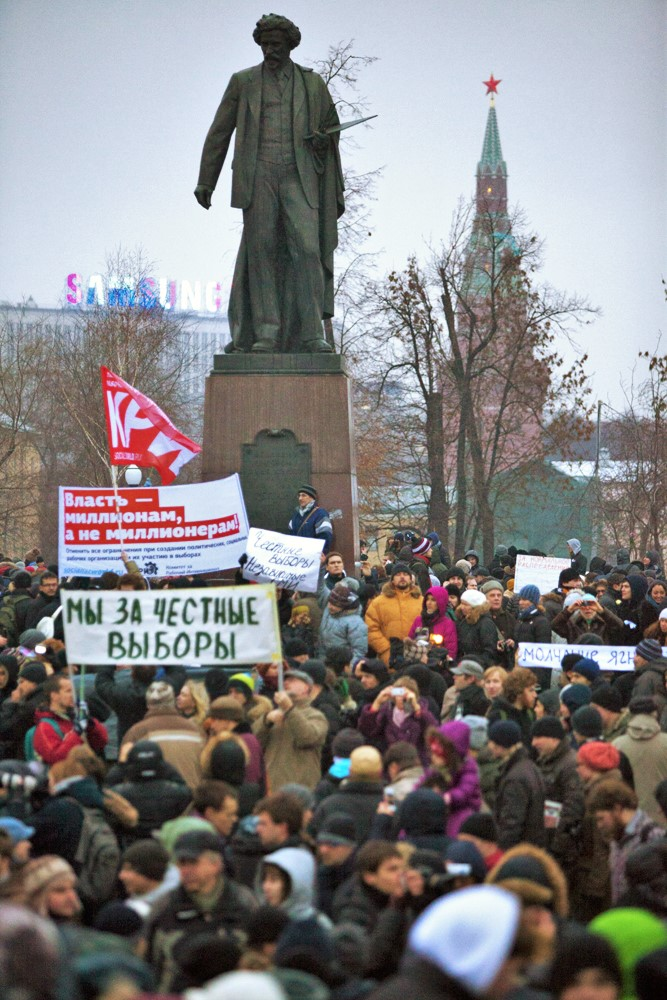
Protesters around the Repin monument during the 2011 Russian protests
