= Eduard Bagirov =

Russian writer, radio presenter and politician (1975–2023)

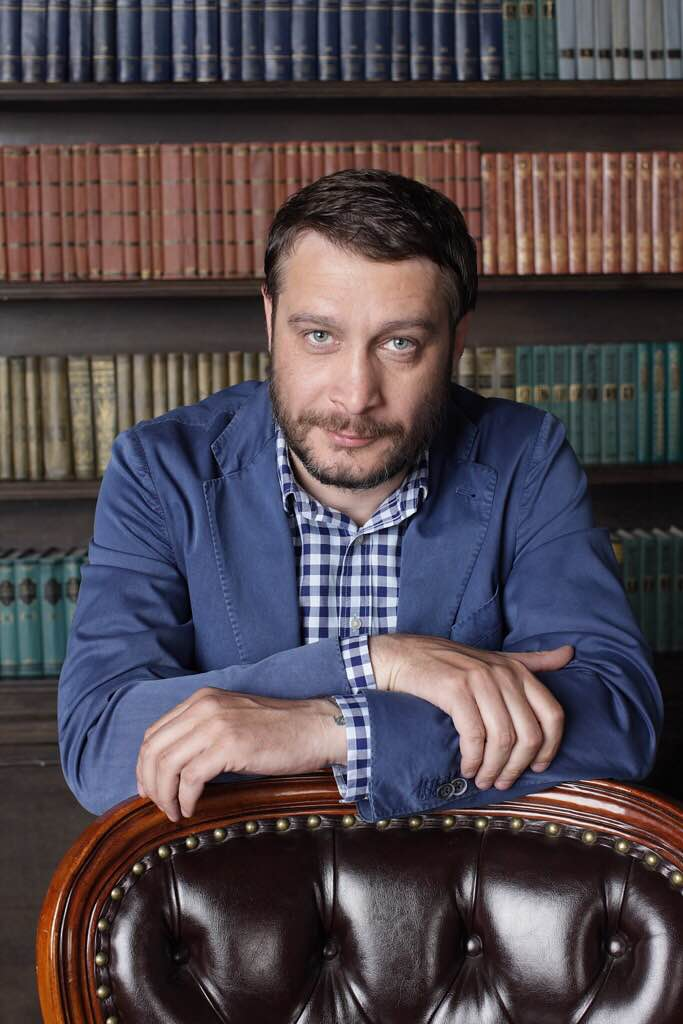
- Died: Moscow
- Website: bagirov.tv

Eduard Ismaylovich Bagirov (Russian: Эдуард Исмаилович Багиров; 25 October 1975 – 12 April 2023) was a Russian writer, radio presenter, and politician. He was a confidant of Vladimir Putin in the 2012 Russian presidential election. In 2016, he ran for the State Duma under the Patriots of Russia party.

== Biography ==
Eduard Ismailovich Bagirov was born on 25 October 1975 in Mary, former Turkmen SSR, since 1991 Turkmenistan. In the early 1990s he moved to Russia. In 1994, he was convicted by a Moscow court of "embezzlement committed by a group of persons by prior conspiracy" (theft) and was imprisoned. He later claimed he was in prison "by stupidity, by youth." In 2012, he became a confidant of Vladimir Putin then presidential candidate. Bagirov is known as the author of the novels: semi autobiographic "Gustarbeiter" released in 2007, "Lovers" released in 2008, "Idealist" released in 2010. He also managed screenwriting bureau that took part in a number of well known Russian projects.

== Death ==
Bagirov died after "multiple organ failure and coma" at the age of 47. According to RT editor Margarita Simonyan he (allegedly) died on 12 April 2023.
