= Tiger (organisation) =

Russian campaign group, resisting car import taxes

Tiger (Russian ТИГР, short for Товарищество Инициативных Граждан России, Fellowship of Proactive Citizens of Russia) is a Russian-based opposition pressure group formed in 2008 in order to resist government implementation of higher car import taxes.

== History ==
Tiger was set up in the eastern city of Vladivostok in December 2008 in response to Russian government actions raising import taxes for cars. Its activities have since spread to other areas of eastern Russia.

== Activities ==
Tiger has been involved in a series of demonstrations that have taken place in December 2008 and January 2009. It also publishes a web-based newspaper Plamya (The Flame). According to The Times, it has called for "the resignation of Mr. Putin, the restoration of free speech and government respect for the constitution". In response, the "authorities responded forcefully, shutting down Tiger's website, arresting two prominent members and sending the feared FSB, the KGB's successor, to interrogate youngsters who had posted messages on the organisation's website."
