= Vladislav Postnikov =

- Владислав Постников
- Born: 8 June 1988; Nyazepetrovsk, Soviet Union
- Occupations: Journalist, politician, environmental activist
- Political party: Yabloko; Open Russia

Vladislav Vladimirovich Postnikov (Russian: Владислав Владимирович Постников; born June 8, 1988, in Nyazepetrovsk, Chelyabinsk Oblast, RSFSR, Soviet Union) is a Russian public and political figure, journalist, and environmental activist. He was the coordinator of the Open Russia regional branch in the Sverdlovsk Oblast (2018–2019/21). He is also the editor-in-chief of the newspaper Vecherniye Vedomosti (since 2021).

== Biography ==
He was born on June 8, 1988, in Nyazepetrovsk, a town of 17,000 in the northern Chelyabinsk Oblast. His grandfather and father worked on the South Urals Railway. His father played a relatively minor role in Postnikov's life. His mother and grandmother died when he was 17. He moved to Yekaterinburg and enrolled at the South Urals Railway. In Yekaterinburg, Postnikov became involved in the environmental movement and regional opposition. He began his career as an environmental activist, organizing city environmental protests.

He participated in and covered the protests in Yekaterinburg's public garden. He broadcast live from the scene during the protests as a correspondent for the publication Molniya. He was detained despite having a press card, but was later released without charge. During his arrest, police Major Svetlana Babinova, to whom Postnikov showed his press card, advised him to "put it away," sparking a wave of indignation in the media. The Sverdlovsk Regional Court later upheld the detention and confiscation of his communications equipment, stating that he allegedly failed to present his card to a police officer. During and after the protests, he was subjected to harassment, summonses, and searches.

In 2020, he was one of the founders and subsequently secretary of the People's Initiative. The movement aimed to organize a campaign to reinstate direct elections for the mayor of Yekaterinburg, which had been abolished following Yevgeny Roizman's unexpected victory in the 2013 elections. The People's Initiative was a political coalition of Open Russia, Yabloko, and Navalny Headquarters. The movement itself was subjected to persecution, criticism, and discreditation by official authorities in Yekaterinburg and the Sverdlovsk Oblast, particularly Lyudmila Babushkina. Ultimately, the movement managed to collect signatures. However, the Legislative Assembly of the Sverdlovsk region rejected the return of direct elections as part of the people's initiative.

That same year, he was one of the initiators of the electoral commission's refusal to serve as a full member during the vote on the constitutional amendments. He was a Yabloko candidate in the 2020 by-election to the Yekaterinburg City Duma, finishing second with 20.91% of the vote. Following the election, he was subject to political persecution: he was accused of allegedly failing to campaign for himself while being a member of the precinct election commission. The case was dismissed by the court in 2021 due to lack of evidence of wrongdoing.

In 2021, he unsuccessfully ran for mayor of Yekaterinburg as part of the Yekaterinburg City Duma commission. He also ran for the Legislative Assembly of the Sverdlovsk Oblast as a Yabloko candidate, finishing second with 20.60% of the vote.

Between 2020 and 2021, Postnikov began to move away from activism and politics, transitioning to journalism. In 2020, he became editor-in-chief, and then, in 2021, editor-in-chief of Vecherniye Vedomosti. Under Postnikov's leadership, the publication became one of the few Ural media outlets to provide detailed and open coverage of the anti-war protests in Yekaterinburg and the Urals. For this, political persecution began against him in 2022. Searches were organized against Vladislav, and he was also fined for refusing to remove posts about protests from the publication's Telegram channel.

On February 28, 2025, Vladislav Postnikov was detained by police for displaying extremist symbols in a post on his Telegram channel. It reported on fake videos featuring politicians Alexei Navalny and Leonid Volkov, allegedly calling on Russians not to vote in the 2026 election to the State Duma. The video featured the logo of Navalny Headquarters — a red exclamation mark on a white background, recognized as an extremist symbol. Following his release, he was immediately arrested again on March 14. This time, the Leninsky District Court of Nizhny Tagil found him guilty of publications from 2020 to 2021, one of which featured an exclamation mark associated with the Anti-Corruption Foundation's "Smart Voting" project. Following his release on March 28, he was immediately arrested a third time. However, taking advantage of the inattention of police officers, as well as the fact that a report had not yet been drawn up against him, he simply walked out of the police building and fled the region.

After his release, he fell ill due to the conditions in the pretrial detention center, complained of deteriorating health, and refused to report to the police without an official summons. However, despite persecution, he refused to leave Russia. In April 2025, he was stripped of his powers as a member of the electoral commission.
