= Alexei Navalny 2018 presidential campaign =

2018 political campaign

- Campaign: 2018 Russian presidential election
- Candidate: Alexei Navalny; Founder of the FBK; Chairman of the Progress Party (2013–de jure present)
- Affiliation: Russian opposition
- Status: Announced: 13 December 2016; Official nomination: 24 December 2017; Denied registration: 25 December 2017
- Headquarters: Moscow
- Key people: Chief of staff: Leonid Volkov; Deputy campaign manager: Roman Rubanov; Legal adviser: Ivan Zhdanov
- Slogan(s): Пора выбирать (It's time to Choose)

Website
- 2018.navalny.com

The Russian opposition figure and anti-corruption activist Alexei Navalny announced his intention to run for President of Russia in the 2018 election on 13 December 2016. The primary themes of his campaign have been focusing on domestic issues, including combating corruption in Russia and improving the economy. Commentators noted that Navalny's campaign was unprecedented in modern Russia as politicians usually do not start campaigning until a few months before the election.

Navalny began openly campaigning for the presidency before the official registration for the elections occurred in spite of court proceedings against him in a fraud case, which could bar him from running since the Russian election legislation deprives certain criminals of eligibility. In February 2017, a district court in Kirov upheld his suspended sentence despite the European Court of Human Rights siding with Navalny. In May, the deputy chief of the Central Election Commission commented that Navalny will not be allowed to run. Navalny and his staff said that they will appeal to the ECHR and will continue campaigning to give the government no choice but to accept his candidacy.

He officially submitted his documents for registration as a candidate on December 24, 2017, and was rejected by the Central Election Commission the following day due to his conviction. Later that same day, December 25, Navalny called on his supporters to boycott the election in response.

== Background ==
Alexei Navalny announced his intention to run for President of Russia on 13 December 2016 and since then has been traveling to cities throughout Russia to meet with supporters and open regional offices. He had first spoken about doing so in April 2013, and in September of that year, he had taken part in the Moscow mayoral election, in which he got 27% of the vote. Before that, he was one of the main leaders of the 2011 protests after the parliamentary election. As noted by Newsweek and the former Russian presidential administration adviser Gleb Pavlovsky, the campaign by Navalny was unprecedented in modern Russia as most candidates do not start campaigning until a few months before the election. His chief of staff Leonid Volkov stated that a part of the reason they started a year early was to raise support and to give the Russian government no choice but to let Navalny take part in the election in spite of ruling regarding the Kirovles case. The primary focus of Navalny's campaign is combating the corruption within the current government under Vladimir Putin and Prime Minister Dmitry Medvedev. In mid-April 2017, Navalny was endorsed by the exiled oligarch Mikhail Khodorkovsky and the liberal People's Freedom Party leader Mikhail Kasyanov as an alternative to incumbent President Vladimir Putin.

=== Legal case ===
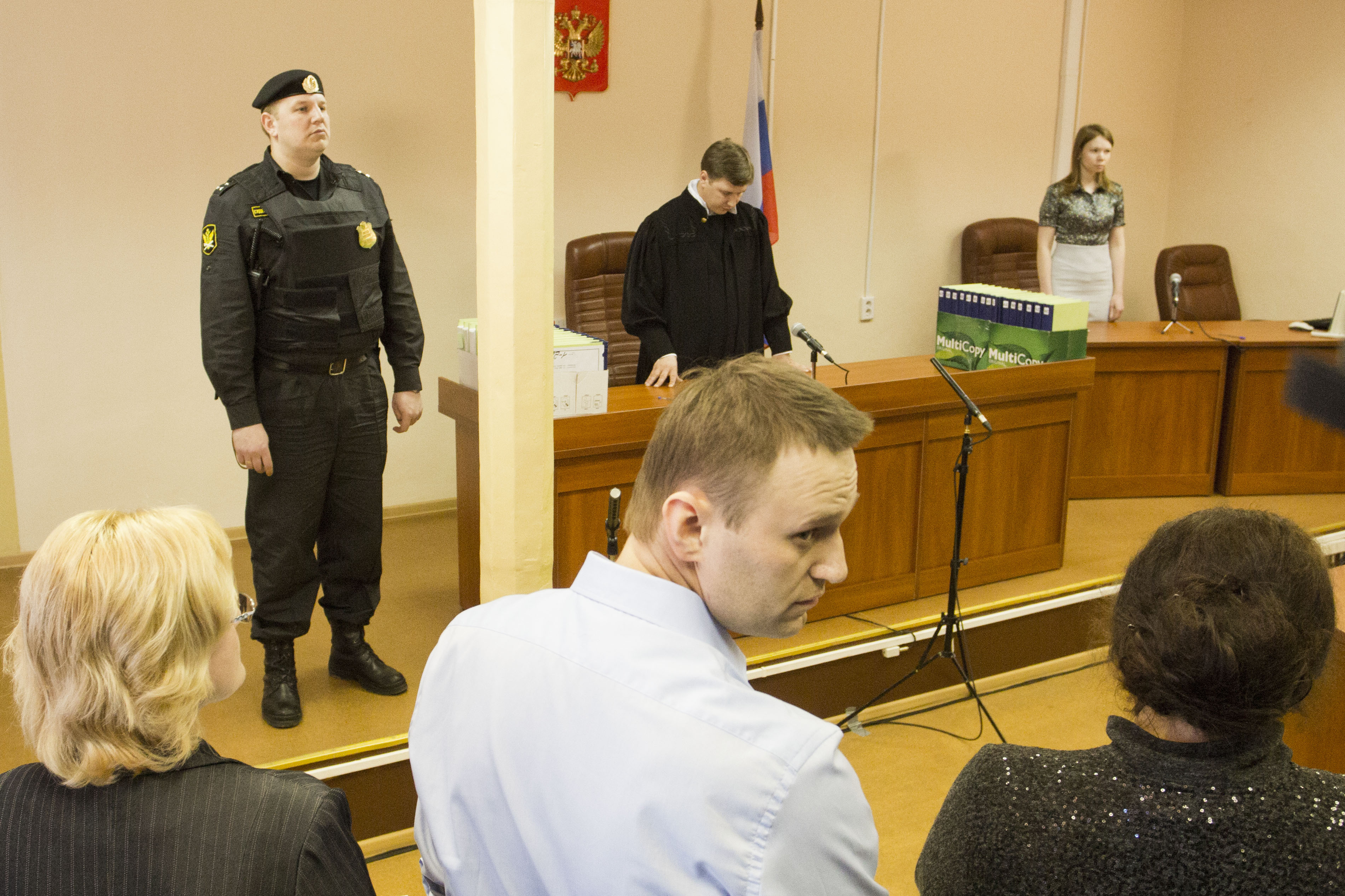
Navalny facing trial in 2013 for the "Kirovles case"

Concerns about Navalny's participation in the elections include the "Kirovles case", when in 2009, according to investigators, Navalny ordered a local businessman to create an intermediary company then persuaded the administration of the local Kirov Oblast corporation Kirovles to sign a deal with the new company on unfavorable terms. Kirovles allegedly lost millions of dollars while the middleman company made a profit. The investigation lasted until 2013 at which point he was given a five-year prison sentence, which was suspended with a 500,000 ruble fine. In November 2016 the Russian Supreme Court annulled the sentence and returned the case to the Leninsky District court in the city of Kirov for a retrial. In February 2017, the district court ruled to uphold Navalny's sentence despite pressure from the European Court of Human Rights, which sided with Navalny. The issue may block Navalny from participating in the elections as Russian law does not allow criminal offenders to run for office, and after the retrial both Vyacheslav Volodin, speaker of the State Duma, and Medvedev's spokesman Dmitry Peskov stated that he will probably not be allowed to run.

Navalny argued that the Constitution of the Russian Federation only prevents those who are in prison and those who are legally unfit from taking part in elections and believes that he is still legally able to run. In February he stated "It says clearly in the constitution that only those who are in prison are banned. So I am not banned. For now." He also said that "What we have just seen is a telegram of sorts from the Kremlin, saying that they consider me, my team and people whose views I represent too dangerous to be allowed into the election campaign." Navalny and his supporters also accuse it of being a political case, though the Russian government denies it. Leonid Volkov, his chief of staff, said that the presidential campaign will continue and that they will appeal to the European Court of Human Rights.

The cases are widely believed to be fabricated in retaliation for his political activity. The Memorial Human Rights Center recognized Navalny as a political prisoner.

== Campaigning ==
Alternative campaign logo; the red exclamation is combined with the Cyrillic letter Н, representing Navalny's Russian initial

Since opening his first campaign office in Saint Petersburg in February 2017, Navalny plans to open at least forty offices across the country by the end of May, later increasing the number to over seventy. He has been traveling to different cities rather than focus on a few larger ones, unlike many other Russian politicians. In early April, his chief of staff Leonid Volkov stated that Navalny will continue his campaign despite the Leninsky District court upholding his five-year sentence for the Kirovles fraud case, and that Navalny intends to appeal against the ban from running. He personally visited many of the locations for the opening ceremonies of the local campaign offices where he met with and spoke to his supporters. In April 2017, it was reported that Navalny's campaign staff collected more than 300,000 signatures from people across 40 regions of Russia electronically. More than 75,000 people signed up to volunteer for his campaign and nearly $700,000 has been donated.

=== March 26 protest ===
In March 2017, the Anti-Corruption Foundation led by Navalny published a documentary video on YouTube titled He Is Not Dimon to You, in which he stated that Prime Minister Dmitry Medvedev possessed large properties which he obtained with bribes from oligarchs and bank loans through non-governmental organizations. The video gained tens of millions of views, but the Medvedev government ignored it and did not make any response. As a result, Navalny called for mass rallies on March 26 to protest against this. Tens of thousands of people reportedly took part in the protests on that day, with rallies being held in dozens of cities across Russia (including Moscow and Saint Petersburg), using social media to organize and reportedly including large numbers of young people. After the protests, Medvedev's approval rating fell and the number of people stating in polls that they would vote for Navalny rose. Navalny was jailed for several days afterwards for disobeying orders from the police, along with somewhere between five hundred to one thousand other demonstrators. He called for more demonstrations to take place on June 12, which is the national holiday Russia Day.

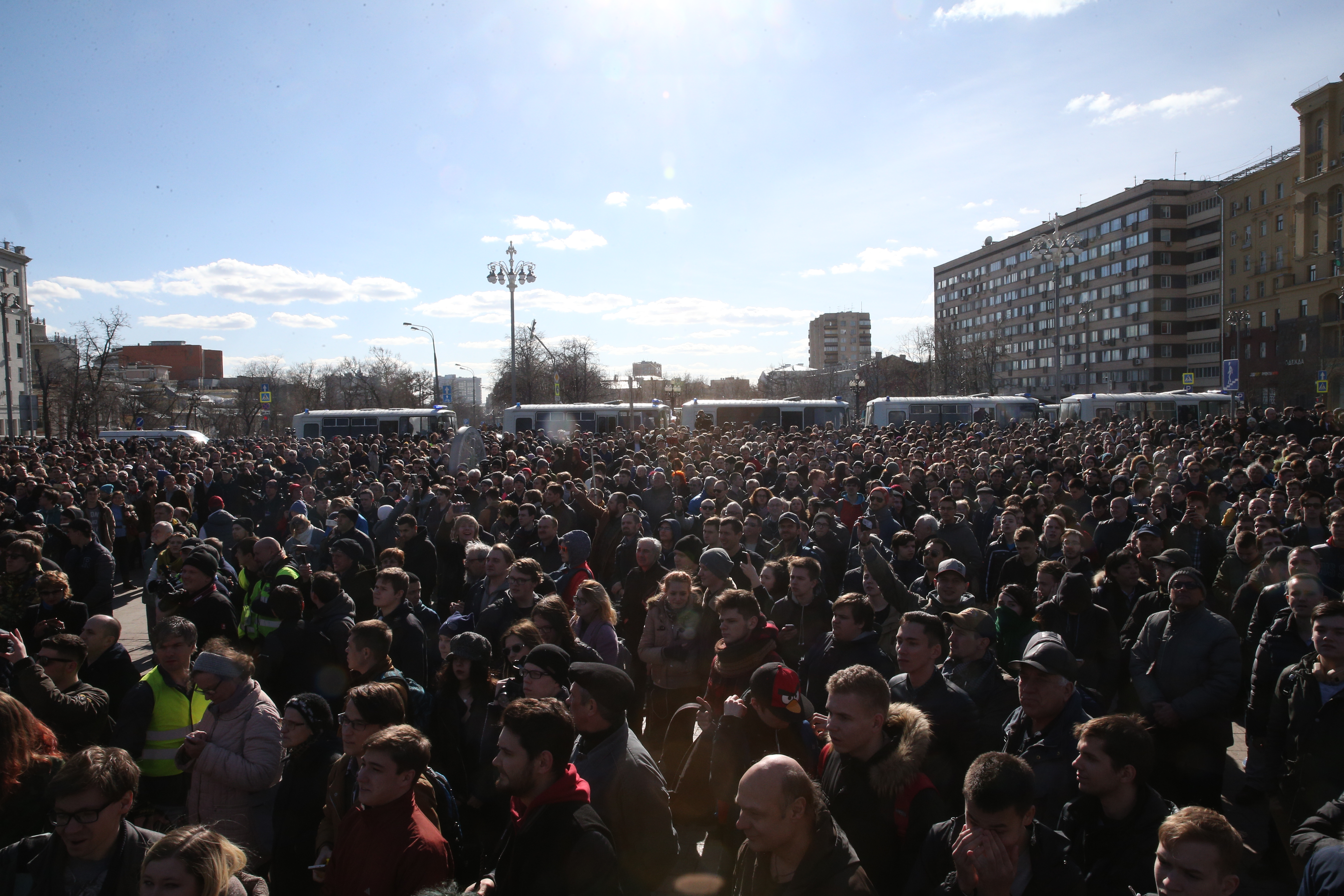
Protestors in Moscow at the 26 March

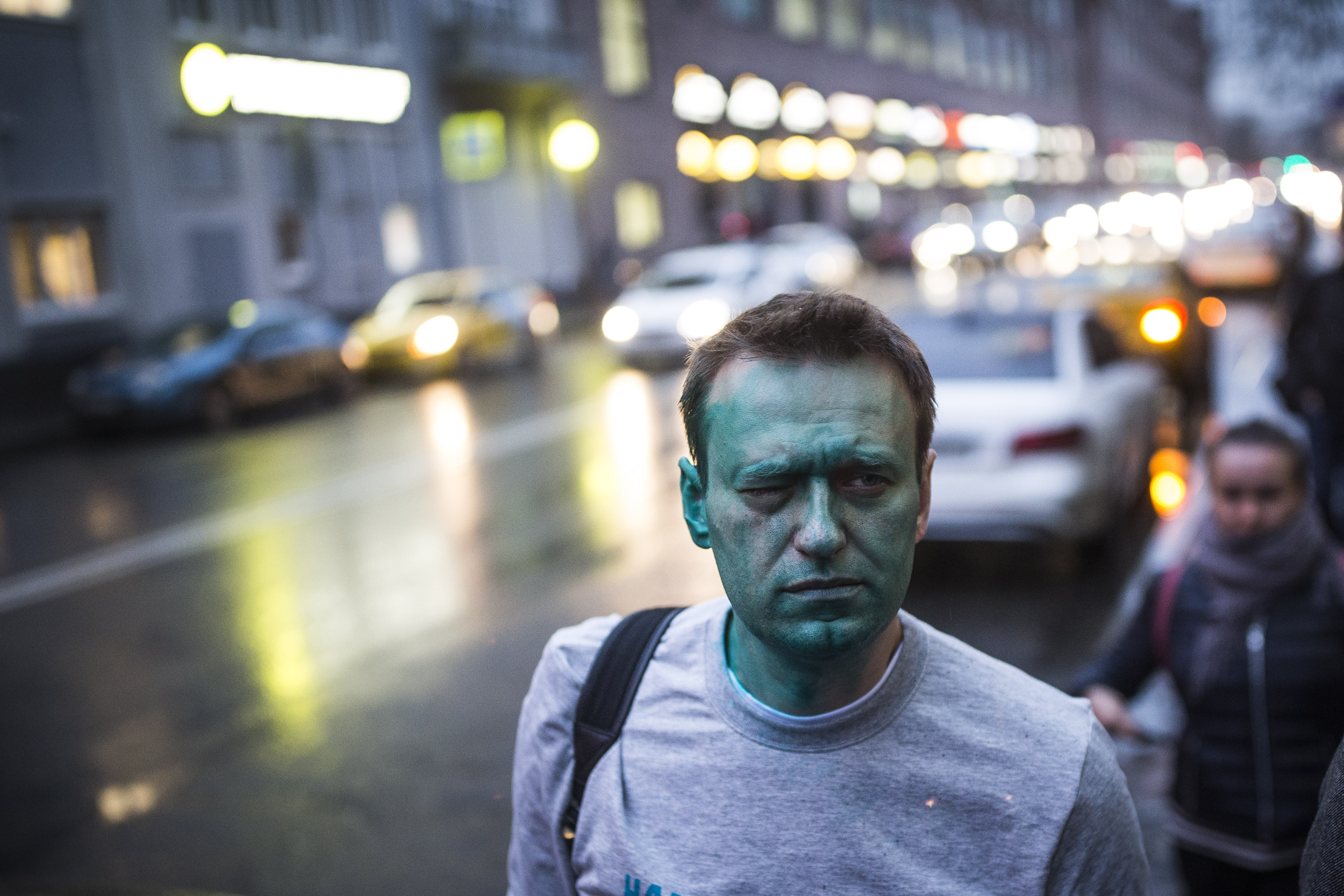
Navalny after being doused in green dye

=== Attacks on Navalny and others ===
There have been several instances of sabotage by unknown assailants that Alexei Navalny describes as being pro-Putin activists. In April 2017 he was splashed with the alcoholic solution of brilliant green twice, on one occasion having no major effect while on the second occasion one of his eyes was damaged by chemicals, causing some loss of vision. The police have not captured the attacker although an investigation was opened. Acts of sabotage have taken place against other members of the campaign as well. In March, in the city of Tomsk, the doors to the apartments of several local campaign coordinators were glued shut with inflatable foam, while their cars were also vandalized. In the middle of the opening speech being given by Navalny police arrived and told everyone to evacuate the building due to a bomb threat.

=== After the court ruling ===
Navalny and his team stated on 3 May 2017 that they will be continuing their campaign despite the regional court in Kirov upheld his sentence and potentially barring him from taking part in the election, with the intention of building up support and making the Russian government allow him to participate. On 23 June 2017, the Central Election Commission stated that Navalny can not run for the presidency because of his past conviction. Navalny was detained on 12 June 2017 prior to an unauthorised demonstration in Moscow which was to coincide with Russia Day, and then sentenced to 30 days in jail, which was subsequently reduced to 25 days.

=== Autumn, third arrest ===
In October 2017, Navalny was detained in Moscow and then sentenced to jail time for the third time since launching his campaign, this time for organising a campaign event in Nizhny Novgorod. The event was initially agreed by the Nizhny Novgorod administration, however later permission was withdrawn. Navalny said that he had been arrested in order to prevent him from participating in future campaign events, including one planned for October 7 (Putin's birthday) in Saint Petersburg (Putin's hometown).

On 4 October Navalny called for mass demonstrations to be held on October 7 in 80 cities throughout Russia. The aim of these protests was to demand real political competition in Russia and that Navalny is granted access to the elections.

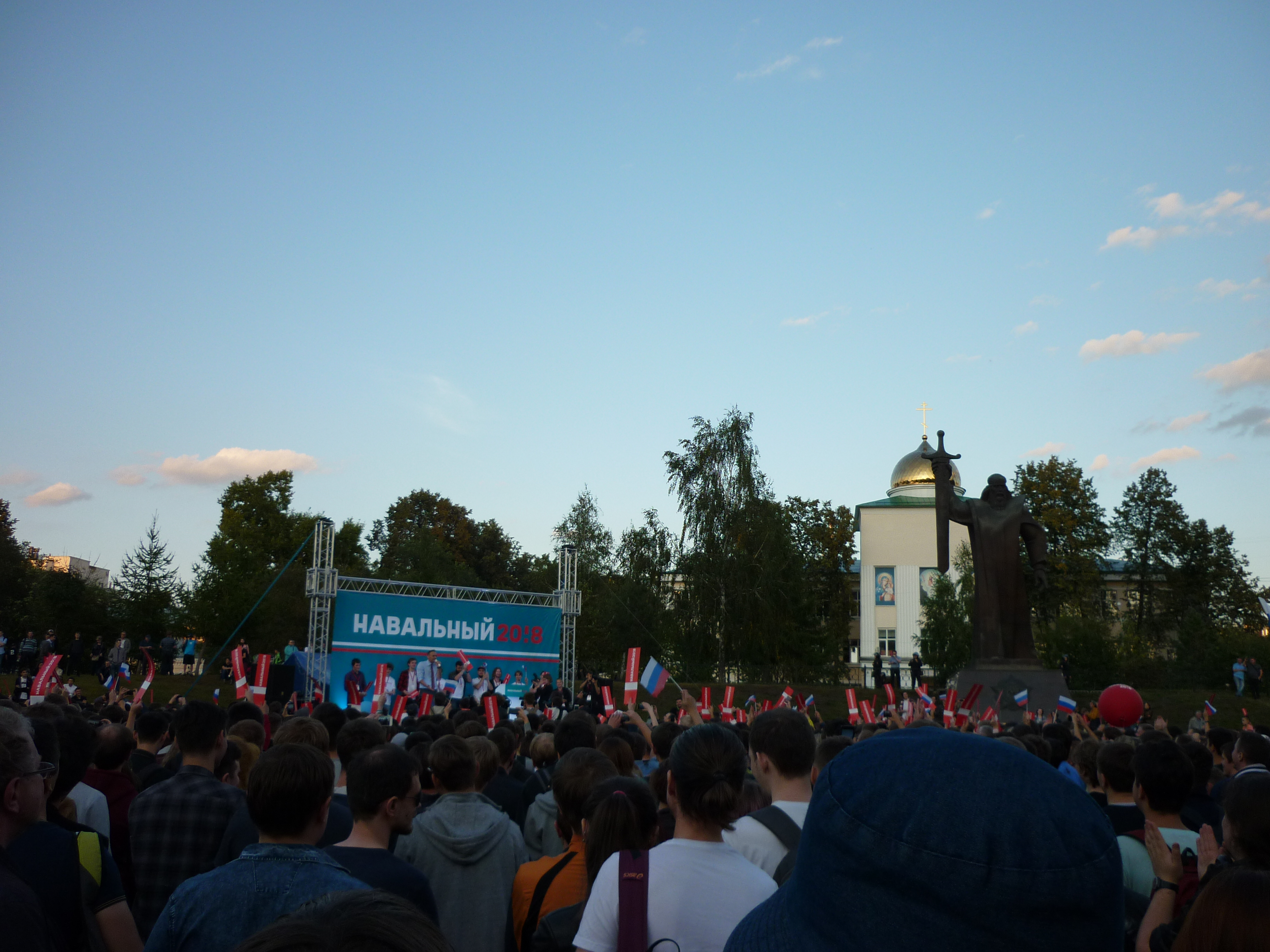
Large crowd hears Navalny speak in Yekaterinburg on September 16

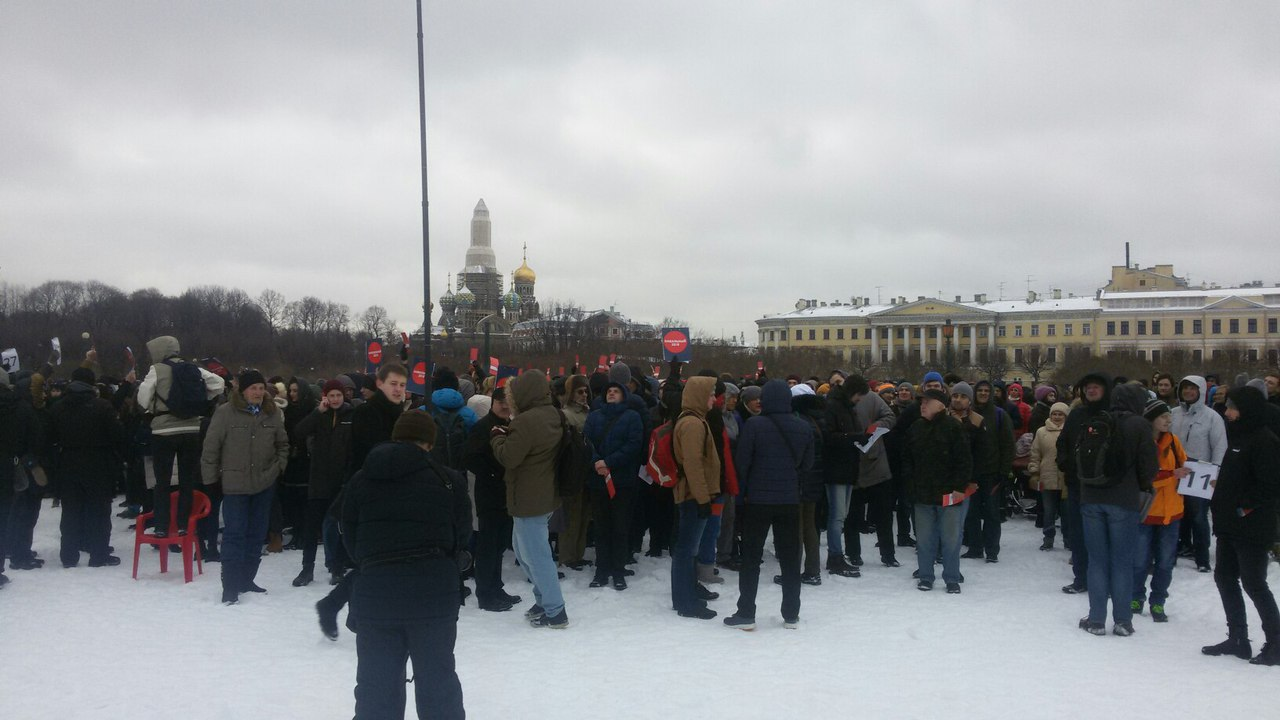
An initiative group meets in St. Petersburg to nominate Navalny

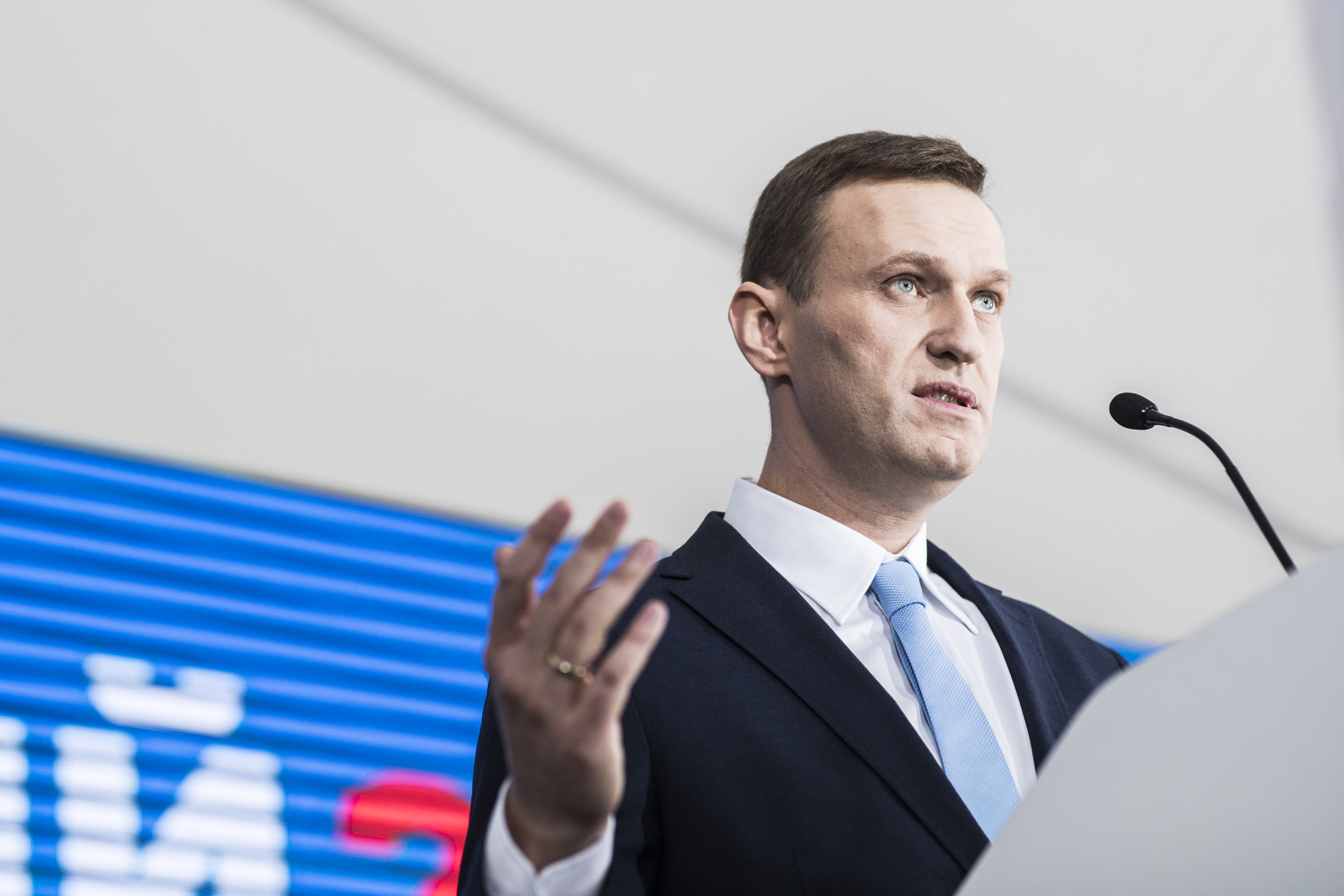
Navalny delivering a speech at his nomination ceremony in Moscow

=== Registration and official rejection ===
On December 24, Navalny launched his official candidacy at Serebryany Bor, Beach No. 3, located in Moscow. Here, Navalny held a meeting of an "initiative group" to register his candidacy. Navalny announced that he had gathered enough endorsements to run in the election, after his supporters had previously organized rallies in 20 cities across Russia to secure 15,000 signatures.

The meeting featured a nomination ceremony, and was attended by exactly 742 supporters. He needed 500 endorsements each in 20 cities, thus similar events were held in nineteen other cities across Russia. These events took place in Chelyabinsk, Irkutsk, Izhevsk, Krasnoyarsk, Nizhny Novgorod, Novosibirsk, Omsk, Perm. St. Petersburg, Rostov-on-Don, Samara, Saratov, Tyumen, Ufa, Vladivostok, Volgograd, Voronezh, Yaroslavl, and Yekaterinburg. The nomination in Moscow was also attended by election workers, who were there to witness that everything was being done in accordance with the law. Navalny and his supporters began to assemble the documents to officially register his candidacy with the elections committee, with some difficulty, as the low temperatures caused their printers to stop working.

At the meeting, Navalny called Vladimir Putin a “bad president,” saying,

"It's you, Vladimir Putin, that turned our country into a source of personal enrichment for yourself, your family, and your friends. Therefore, you should no longer be president."

Navalny also alleged that Putin lacks the strong public support that he claims to hold, and that his candidacy was going prove that to be the case.

After the meeting, Navalny tweeted,

"I have become an official candidate nominated by activist groups of voters. Many thanks to those who have taken part in this campaign in all corners of our country. You are the best."

The meeting was followed the same day by an opposition protest attended by 1,000 in Lermontov Square. The protest was a pro-Navalny demonstration organized by Ilya Yashin.

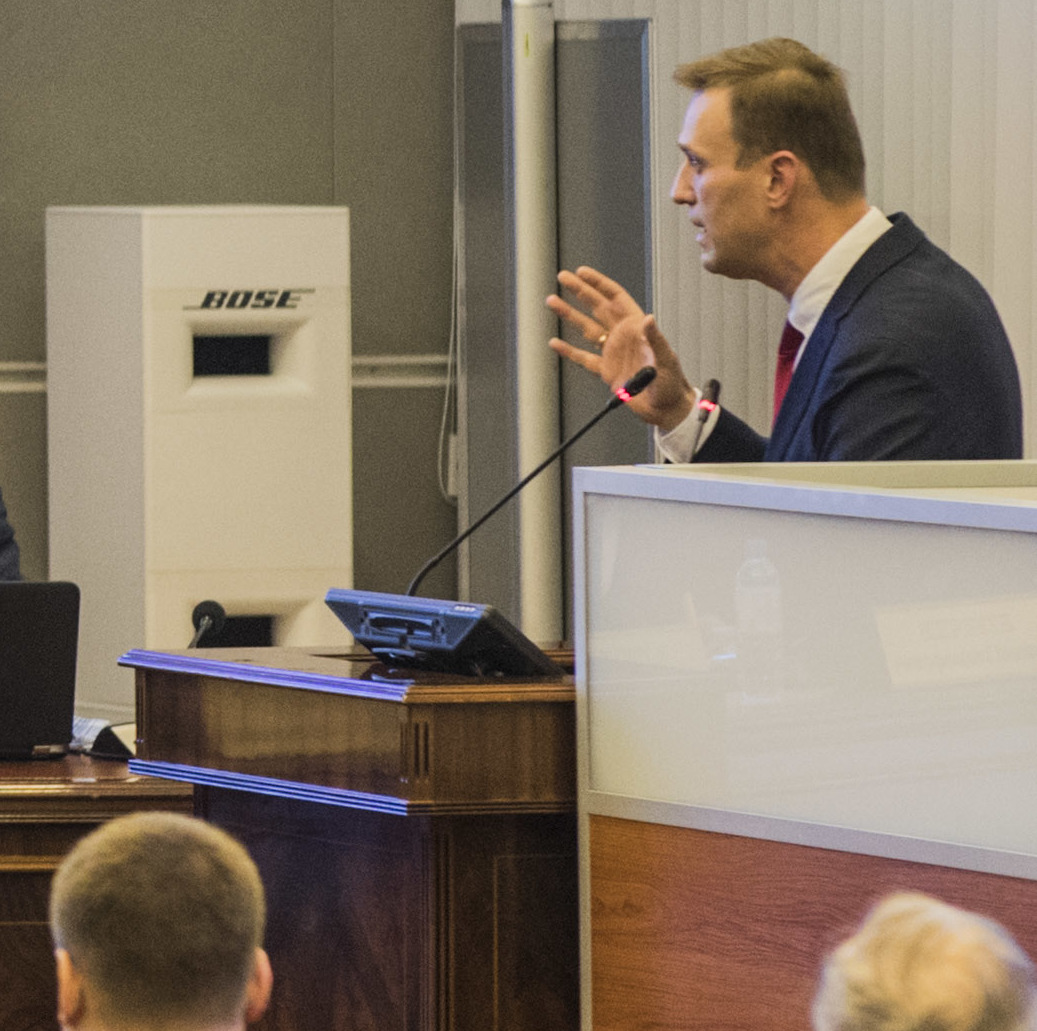
Navalny argues before the election commission on December 25

On December 25, the elections commission voted that Navalny was ineligible to run for president, thus officially rejecting Navalny's candidacy and barring him from running. Navalny responded to the commission's decision by calling on his supporters to boycott the election. Navalny released a pre-recorded video following the decision, saying,

"The procedure that we're invited to take part is not an election. Only Putin and the candidates he has hand-picked are taking part in it. Going to the polls right now is to vote for lies and corruption."

Of his call for a boycott, Navalny told BBC,

"We're declaring a strike by voters. The procedure that we're invited to take part is not an election. Only Putin and the candidates that he personally chose, ones who don't pose the slightest threat to him, are taking part."

Before the decision had been announced, Navalny had commented that the speed with which they had held assembled to vote, only 18 hours after he had filed his candidacy, indicated that they had already decided beforehand to reject his candidacy. Navalny filed a lawsuit to appeal against the CEC’s decision in Russia’s Supreme Court on 28 December. At the hearing, which took place on 30 December, the Supreme Court rejected Navalny’s claim. Navalny filed an appeal against the Supreme Court’s ruling on 3 January 2018.

=== 28 January 2018 protests ===
On 28 January, thousands rallied in at least 118 cities, with estimates ranging from approximately 3,500–4,500 participants per the Ministry of Internal Affairs to 5,000 or more according to independent observers. In Moscow, several thousand people defied a harsh winter and a heavy police presence on Tverskaya Street and in Pushkin Square. Supporters also gathered in St. Petersburg, Novosibirsk, Yakutsk (at temperatures as low as –45 °C), Vladivostok and many other cities.

Authorities responded with sweeping detentions. OVD‑Info, an independent monitor, reported about 250 arrests nationwide, while other sources noted up to 350–400 detainees.

Navalny himself was detained in Moscow soon after joining the demonstration on Tverskaya. Images captured him being wrestled to the ground and placed in a police van. From the van, he tweeted: “I have been detained. This means nothing. You are not rallying for me, but for yourselves and your future.” He was released later that day without charge, though was informed he faced potential court proceedings.

Earlier that morning, police raided Navalny’s Moscow Anti‑Corruption Foundation (FBK) office under the pretext of a bomb threat. They used an angle grinder to force entry, shut down the live video broadcast, and detained several staff members. Despite repression, the demonstrations underscored significant public frustration. Protesters in Moscow chanted slogans such as “Putin is a thief,” “Voters’ strike,” and “Russia without Putin,” while many carried signs rejecting the legitimacy of the election. The coordinated nationwide action, organized via social media and Navalny’s campaign network, was viewed as both a symbolic protest against a sham election and a potential catalyst for increased civic engagement.

== Tour of Russia ==
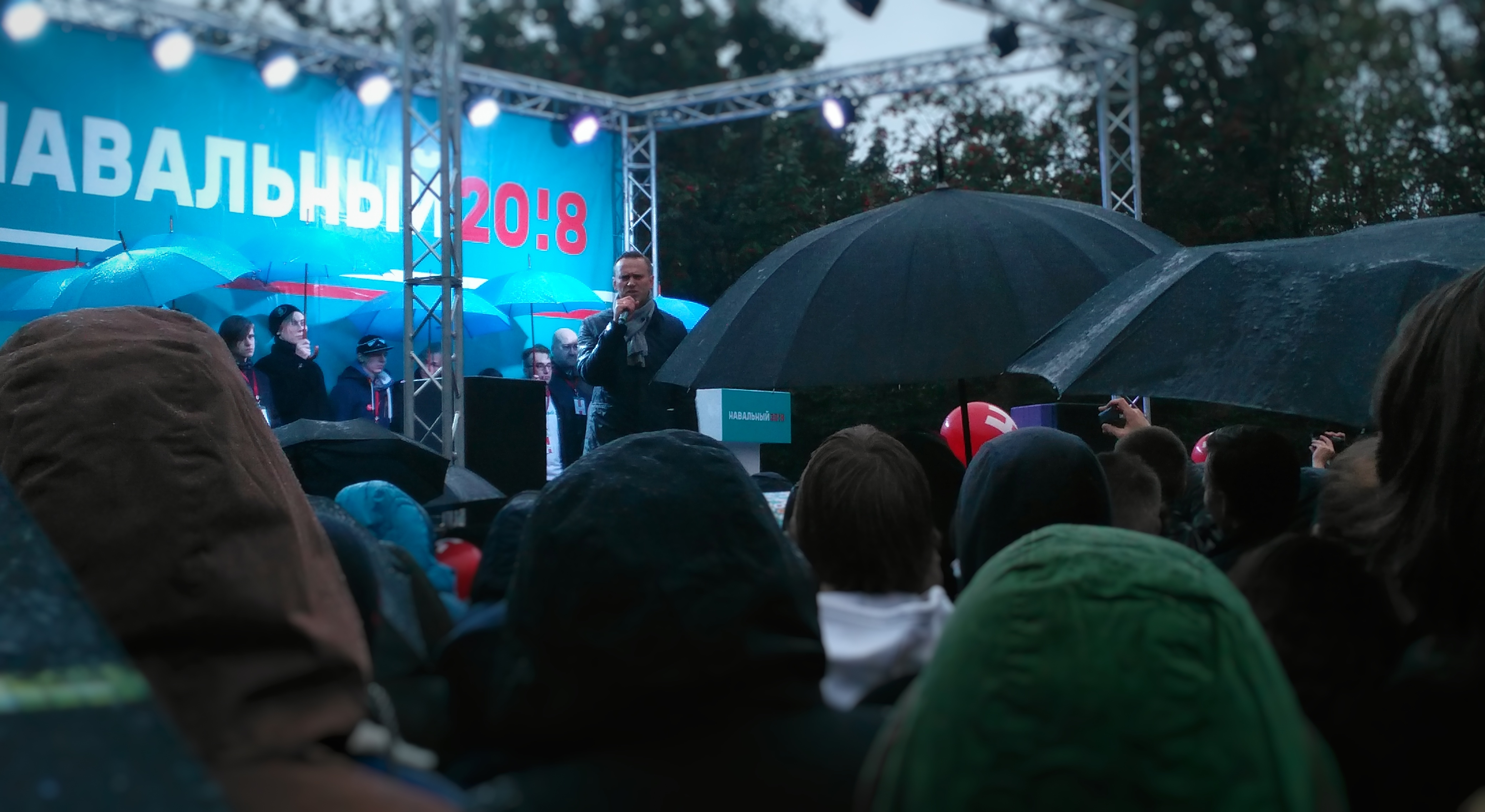
First speech of Navalny's tour, in Murmansk

In September 2017, Navalny began a big agitation tour of Russia, which included 27 cities:

- Murmansk (15 September 2017)
- Yekaterinburg (16 September 2017)
- Omsk (17 September 2017)
- Novosibirsk (22 September 2017)
- Vladivostok (23 September 2017)
- Khabarovsk (24 September 2017)
- Orenburg (30 September 2017)
- Arkhangelsk (1 October 2017)
- Astrakhan (22 October 2017)
- Ivanovo (27 October 2017)
- Kursk (28 October 2017)
- Tambov (29 October 2017)
- Irkutsk (4 November 2017)
- Kemerovo (5 November 2017)
- Volgograd (10 November 2017)
- Izhevsk (11 November 2017)
- Smolensk (12 November 2017)
- Perm (24 November 2017)
- Vladimir (25 November 2017)
- Nizhny Novgorod (25 November 2017)
- Chelyabinsk (26 November 2017)
- Saratov (1 December 2017)
- Pskov (2 December 2017)
- Samara (3 December 2017)
- Barnaul (8 December 2017)
- Novokuznetsk (9 December 2017)
- Kaliningrad (10 December 2017)

== Campaign strategy ==
According to a January 2017 publication on the website of Leonid Volkov, Navalny's chief of staff, their strategy revolves around setting up regional offices that will serve the following functions:

- Preparation for collecting signatures
- Preparation for election observers
- Raising support

They had opened offices in 83 cities by the summer of 2017.

Navalny has announced a series of rallies across Russia on January 28 to call for a boycott of the 2018 presidential election, after Central Election Commission (CEC) refused to register him as a candidate in the race.

== Opinion polls ==
Poll results
Year	Month	Fieldwork	Knowledge of Navalny	Positive opinion/trust	Ready to vote	Source
2017	February	Levada Center	55%		0.47% (definitely will vote); 4.23% (possibly will vote)	
2017	March	Levada Center	55%		2% (definitely will vote); 7% (possibly will vote)	
2017	April	FOM	56%	4% (positive view)		
2017	April	VTSIOM		1.1% (trust)		
2017	April	Levada Center	55%		4% (definitely will vote); 14% (possibly will vote)	

== Political positions ==
=== Economy ===
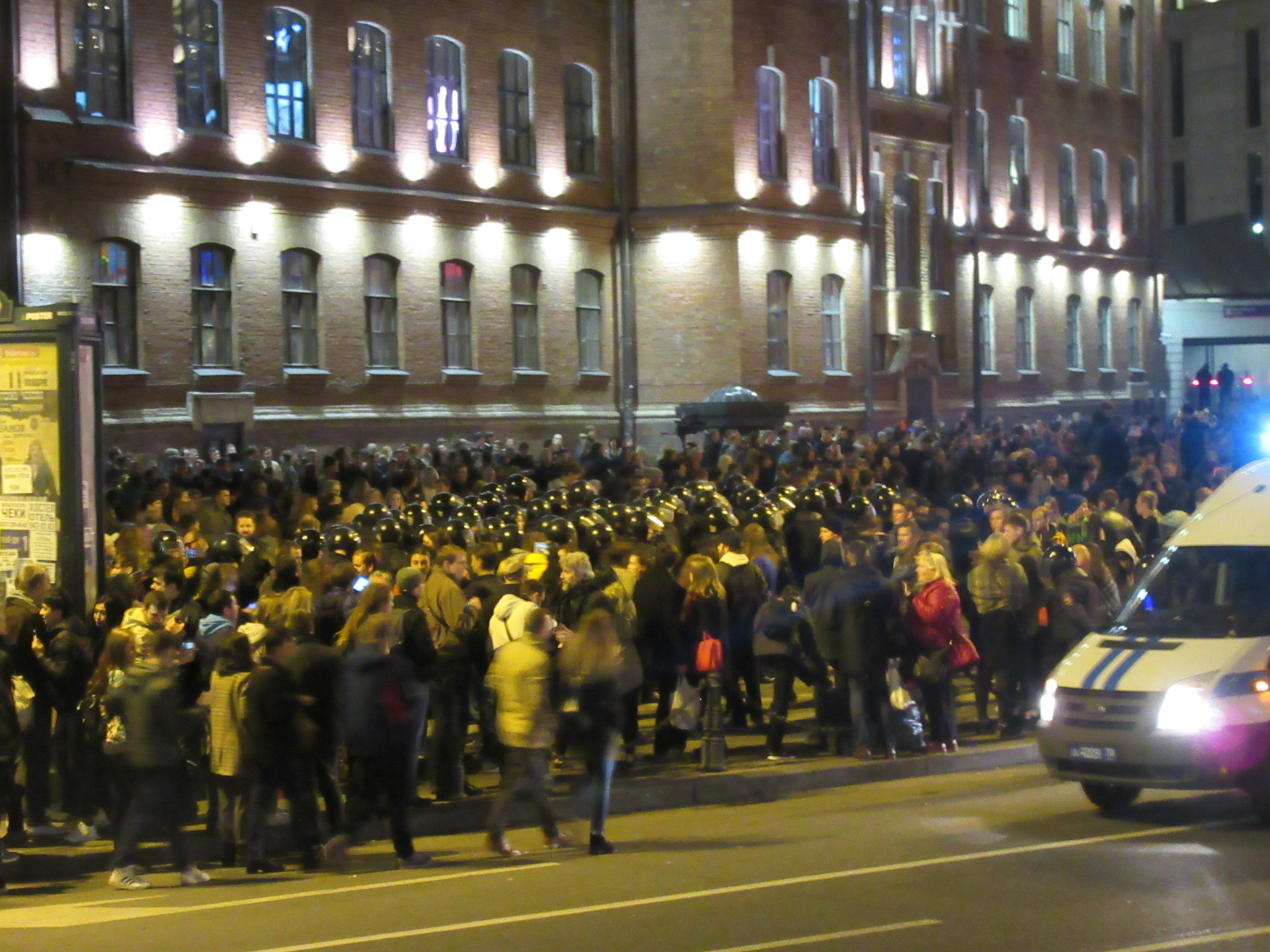
St. Petersburg Navalny supporters hold a march to display their support in October 2017

One of Navalny's primary focuses during the campaign was improving the economy. His more specific economic proposals included instituting a minimum wage, lowering prices of apartments and reducing the bureaucracy of home construction, making healthcare and education free, lowering taxes for many citizens, taxing the gains from privatization, decentralization of financial management and increase in local governance, increasing transparency in state-owned firms, implementing work visas for Central Asian migrants coming into the country for work, and increasing economic cooperation with western European states. He also wanted to collect higher taxes from oligarchs while lowering taxes on small-time entrepreneurs in order to lessen income inequality.

=== Immigration ===
Navalny stated that he wants to introduce a visa regime with the Central Asian republics to register and regulate the number of workers coming to Russia.

=== Foreign policy ===
The primary focus of Navalny's campaign was on domestic issues, although he has commented on foreign policy. He had stated regarding the annexation of Crimea, that a second "honest referendum" needed to be done to confirm the region's status, and believed the War in Donbas could be resolved by implementing the Minsk agreement. He also spoke against the Russian intervention in the Syrian Civil War, believing that there are internal problems that need to be dealt with rather than to get involved in foreign wars. In an interview with a reporter from The Guardian, Navalny summarized his position by saying "I tell them: 'OK great, so Putin is promising to rebuild Palmyra, but why don't you look at the roads in your city? What do you think the priority should be? Fixing the roads in Voronezh or Stavropol or rebuilding Palmyra? The Americans are loaded. Let them fix Palmyra, and we should concentrate on our own problems.'"

Navalny has also stated that he considered Russia to be part of the Western world and did not support the Eurasianist ideology of some Russian government officials. He said that Russia should become a leading country in Europe and Asia through cultural and economic might.

=== Corruption ===
One of the main campaign themes is combating corruption in the Russian government. Navalny proposes to initiate criminal cases against government officials who cannot explain how they were able to acquire very luxurious items that seem too much for their paycheck, which should be identified by the press. He also intends to reform the police and judiciary of Russia to make them more independent.

=== LGBT ===
In an interview with a reporter from RBC, Navalny said that he will repeal the gay propaganda law. He also spoke in support of legalization of same-sex partnership by region via referendums.
