= Navalny Headquarters =

Navalny Headquarters Штабы Навального
- Leader: Vacant
- Chairman: Leonid Volkov
- Founder: Alexei Navalny
- Founded: 4 February 2017 (original); 4 October 2022 (current)
- Dissolved: 26 April 2021 (original)
- Succeeded by: Smart Voting initiative
- Membership (2017): 199,836
- Ideology: Liberalism (Russian); Anti-corruption; Anti-Putinism
- Political position: Centre
- Colours: Blue; Red
- Anthem: "State Anthem of the Russian Federation"

Party flag

Website
- shtab.navalny.com

The Navalny Headquarters (Note: Russian: Штабы Навального, romanized: Shtaby Navalnogo, IPA: [ʂtɐˈbɨ nɐˈvaɫnəvə]) is a Russian organization founded by opposition leader Alexei Navalny as part of his presidential campaign. It formerly operated a network of regional organizations from 2017 to April 2021, when the liquidation of the headquarters was announced in connection with the demand of the Moscow prosecutor's office to recognize the public movement "Navalny Headquarters" as an extremist organization. It was re-established as an underground organization in October 2022.

At the peak of Navalny's presidential campaign, 81 headquarters operated in the regions of Russia, including 11 "people's" ones — opened on the initiative of local residents on their own. After the 2018 presidential election, headquarters continued to work in 45 main regions, their profile changed to a regional politicianу.

== History ==
=== 2017–2021 ===
In December 2016, Alexei Navalny announced the start of the Navalny 2018 presidential campaign. As part of it, the creation of regional campaign headquarters across the country was announced, in which it was planned to collect signatures for the nomination of an oppositionist for president and organize campaigning for a candidate in the regions with the involvement of volunteers The first headquarters was opened in St. Petersburg on 4 February 2017. Its opening took place with the participation of Navalny himself: he held a press conference and met with volunteers, which later became a constant practice.

The opening of regional headquarters was often accompanied by problems: pressure was put on renters of premises, headquarters were vandalized, Navalny himself missed openings several times due to administrative arrests and became a victim of attacks. Already after the opening, many headquarters were subjected to attacks by pro-government activists and vandals, visits by security officials (sometimes with the seizure of campaign materials and equipment) or arrests of employees.

After the end of the election campaign and the "voters' strike", headquarters in the least significant regions were closed, while some of them continued to work as "people's headquarters" for some time. Headquarters in 45 key regions continued to work, reformatted into regional political organizations.

In August 2019, the Investigative Committee opened a case on the laundering of 1 billion rubles by the Anti-Corruption Foundation. As part of this case, several waves of searches were carried out at the FBK office, Navalny's headquarters throughout Russia, their employees and volunteers, and the accounts of legal entities and individuals were blocked. The head of the network of headquarters, Leonid Volkov, stated that the case was initiated with the aim of defeating Navalny's political organization, and also emphasized that the Anti-Corruption Fund, against which the case was initiated, has no legal relationship to Navalny's headquarters. Despite the pressure associated with the criminal case, Navalny's headquarters did not stop working.

On 16 April 2021, the Moscow prosecutor's office filed a lawsuit to recognize Navalny's headquarters and the FBK as extremist organizations. On 26 April, the prosecutor's office decided to suspend the activities of the "Navalny Headquarters public movement" (which never legally existed). On 29 April, the head of the network of headquarters, Leonid Volkov, announced that the headquarters were officially dissolved in order to avoid persecution of employees and activists under articles on extremism. At the same time, it was announced that some headquarters would be reorganized into independent regional political organizations not associated with the FBK and Alexei Navalny.

On 9 June 2021, the Moscow City Court, in a closed session, recognized the "public movement "Navalny Headquarters"" and the FBK as extremist organizations and banned their activities in Russia. By this time, the headquarters had been disbanded for more than a month. On 4 August, the First Appellate court upheld the decision to recognize the organizations as extremist, endowing the Moscow City Court's earlier decision with legal force.

During the process of recognizing Navalny's headquarters as an extremist organization, many of their ex-coordinators left the country due to the threat of persecution, and some of those who remained in Russia were under investigation. 15 former coordinators continued to engage in politics, announcing their nomination to the State Duma or local authorities. In connection with the "law against the FBK" adopted on 4 June 2021, none of them were allowed to participate in the elections as a candidate (or was forced to stop the campaign).

On 9 November 2021, Lilia Chanysheva, the former coordinator of Navalny’s city headquarters, was detained in Ufa and subsequently sent to a pre-trial detention center. She was accused of leading an extremist community, despite her resignation from the post of coordinator before the organization was recognized as extremist (de facto applying Ex post facto law). On 28 December, searches were held at the premises of the ex-coordinators of the headquarters of Ksenia Fadeeva (Tomsk) and Zakhar Sarapulov (Irkutsk). They were charged and banned from certain activities as a preventive measure. On 14 June 2023, Chanysheva was sentenced to seven and a half years in prison on charges of extremism, along with a fine of 400,000 rubles.

=== Since 2022 ===
The organization was re-established in October 2022, particularly to oppose Vladimir Putin, the Russian invasion of Ukraine, and subsequent mobilization in Russia.

== Activities ==
Initially, Navalny's headquarters were deployed throughout Russia as part of the politician's presidential campaign to solve three main tasks: preparing for the collection of signatures, training observers and agitation. They also hosted meetings of supporters and volunteers, trainings, seminars and other events. In the summer of 2017, an active stage of street campaigning began in all cities where headquarters are present: campaign volunteers participated in "cubes" – pickets using a campaign structure in the form of a cube, which collected signatures of citizens for the nomination of Navalny as a presidential candidate in December 2017. In the future, these signatures had to be verified and included in the official signature lists in a short time. The headquarters also covered their own activities on social networks and on YouTube.

In 2017, regional headquarters organized protests announced by Navalny in their cities: 26 March, 12 June and 7 October. They tried to coordinate the events with the authorities, but in some cities people took to the streets without the permission of local administrations. Headquarters provided legal and other assistance to detained protesters.

On 24 December 2017, headquarters organized initiative groups in 20 cities to nominate Alexei Navalny as a candidate in the presidential elections. On 25 December, the Central Election Commission refused to register the politician as a candidate, in connection with which the Navalny team announced a "strike of voters", for which regional headquarters were reorganized. The headquarters also organized observation of the presidential elections in key regions, including Chechnya, known for large-scale electoral fraud, the persecution of disloyal citizens and human rights violations.

After the 2018 presidential election, the network of headquarters was reduced to 45 of the most successful and restructured to work on political projects, mainly on the local agenda. Some headquarters continued to work in the "people's" mode – without funding from the federal headquarters. All active headquarters participated in the organization of protests until the closure of the network in April 2021, among them:

- 2018 Russian pension protests
- 2019 Moscow protests
- 2021 Russian protests

== List of Navalny regional headquarters ==
№	Город	Opening date	Closing date	Opener	Comment
1	Saint Petersburg	4 February 2017	26 April 2021	Alexei Navalny	
2	Novosibirsk	18 February 2017	26 April 2021	Alexei Navalny	
3	Yekaterinburg	25 February 2017	26 April 2021	Alexei Navalny	
4	Samara	3 March 2017	26 April 2021	Alexei Navalny	
5	Ufa	4 March 2017	26 April 2021	Alexei Navalny	
6	Kazan	5 March 2017	26 April 2021	Alexei Navalny	
7	Nizhny Novgorod	6 March 2017	26 April 2021	Alexei Navalny	
8	Tomsk	17 March 2017	26 April 2021	Alexei Navalny	
9	Kemerovo	18 March 2017	26 April 2021	Alexei Navalny	
10	Barnaul	20 March 2017	26 April 2021	Alexei Navalny	During the opening of the headquarters, Navalny was doused with green paint. He worked after the completion of the presidential campaign until 31 March 2018. Was restarted on 3 September 2019.
11	Biysk	20 March 2017	9 November 2018	Alexei Navalny	After the end of the presidential campaign, he worked for 7 months as a "people's headquarters".
12	Volgograd	24 March 2017	26 April 2021	Alexei Navalny	
13	Saratov	25 March 2017	26 April 2021	Alexei Navalny	
14	Voronezh	7 April 2017	26 April 2021	Leonid Volkov (Navalny was serving an administrative arrest on 26 March – 10 April 2017)	
15	Rostov-on-Don	8 April 2017	26 April 2021	Leonid Volkov (Navalny was serving an administrative arrest on 26 March – 10 April 2017)	
16	Krasnodar	8 April 2017	26 April 2021	Leonid Volkov (Navalny was serving an administrative arrest on 26 March – 10 April 2017)	
17	Stavropol	9 April 2017	4 August 2020	Leonid Volkov (Navalny was serving an administrative arrest on 26 March – 10 April 2017)	
18	Tyumen	14 April 2017	26 April 2021	Alexei Navalny	
19	Chelyabinsk	15 April 2017	26 April 2021	Alexei Navalny	Navalny, after the opening of the headquarters, spoke at a rally of opponents of the construction of Tominsky Mining and Processing Plant.
20	Vladimir	21 April 2017	9 November 2018	Alexei Navalny	После окончания президентской кампании проработал 6 месяцев и 28 дней в качестве «народного штаба». В марте 2021 года был анонсирован перезапуск штаба для участия в избирательной кампании в Госдуму, не состоявшийся в связи с требованием прокураторы Москвы о признании штабов Навального экстремистской организацией.
21	Ivanovo	21 April 2017	4 March 2020	Alexei Navalny	
22	Kostroma	22 April 2017	13 October 2020	Alexei Navalny	
23	Yaroslavl	22 April 2017	26 April 2021	Alexei Navalny	
24	Vologda	23 April 2017	3 April 2018	Alexei Navalny	After the end of the presidential campaign, the headquarters continued political activities for some time.
25	Cherepovets	23 April 2017	1 April 2018	Alexei Navalny	
26	Astrakhan	28 April 2017	31 March 2018	Alexei Navalny	
27	Krasnoyarsk	12 May 2017	26 April 2021	Leonid Volkov (Navalny was recovering from eye surgery in Barcelona)	
28	Khabarovsk	13 May 2017	26 April 2021	Leonid Volkov (Navalny was recovering from eye surgery in Barcelona)	
29	Komsomolsk-on-Amur	14 May 2017	31 March 2018	Alexei Navalny	
30	Vladivostok	15 May 2017	26 April 2021	Alexei Navalny	
31	Penza	19 May 2017	26 April 2021	Alexei Navalny	
32	Saransk	20 May 2017	5 November 2019	Alexei Navalny	The opening of the headquarters took place in the field due to pressure on the sites where a meeting with volunteers was planned. On 31 March 2018, the headquarters lost its premises, but continued to work until 2 October 2018. Was restarted on 30 July 2019 and worked until 5 November.
33	Ulyanovsk	20 May 2017	31 March 2018	Alexei Navalny	
34	Yoshkar-Ola	21 May 2017	31 March 2018	Alexei Navalny	
35	Cheboksary	21 May 2017	26 April 2021	Alexei Navalny	
36	Tambov	26 May 2017	26 April 2021	Alexei Navalny	The opening of the headquarters took place in the hangar of the wholesale base due to pressure on the sites where the meeting with volunteers was planned.
37	Ryazan	26 May 2017	18 October 2019	Alexei Navalny	Worked after the end of the presidential campaign until 1 October 2018. Was restarted on 2 September 2019, closed due to loss of equipment and premises on 18 October.
38	Tula	27 May 2017	30 March 2018	Alexei Navalny	
39	Kaluga	27 May 2017	2 October 2018	Alexei Navalny	After the end of the presidential campaign, he worked for six months as a "people's headquarters" without premises.
40	Pskov	28 May 2017	26 April 2021	Alexei Navalny	
41	Veliky Novgorod	28 May 2017	30 March 2018	Alexei Navalny	
42	Tver	29 May 2017	26 April 2021	Alexei Navalny	
43	Smolensk	29 May 2017	December 2019	Alexei Navalny	Worked after the end of the presidential campaign until 2 October 2018. Was restarted on 6 May 2019 and operated until December 2019.
44	Moscow	29 May 2017	26 April 2021	Headquarters team	The opening was canceled several times due to pressure on the venues where a meeting with volunteers was planned. The headquarters started working on 29 May 2017 without the official opening and participation of Navalny. On 31 May, he held a spontaneous meeting with volunteers there.
45	Perm	9 June 2017	26 April 2021	Alexei Navalny	
46	Izhevsk	10 June 2017	26 April 2021	Alexei Navalny	After the end of the presidential campaign, he worked for six months as a "people's headquarters" for 5 months and 13 days. 25 October 2018 resumed work as a "people's headquarters".
47	Bratsk	17 June 2017	31 March 2018	Leonid Volkov	
48	Irkutsk	17 June 2017	26 April 2021	Leonid Volkov	
49	Omsk	18 June 2017	26 April 2021	Leonid Volkov	
49*	Tara	18 June 2017 (planned)			The opening did not take place due to pressure on local supporters.
50	Oryol	20 June 2017	30 March 2018	Headquarters team (Navalny was serving an administrative arrest on 12 June – 7 July 2017)	
51	Kirov	21 June 2017	26 April 2021	Local supporters	Worked after the end of the presidential campaign until 26 March 2018. It was restarted on 1 April 2021 and worked until 26 April.
52*	Zhukovsky	27 June 2017	March 2018	Local supporters	"People's Headquarters" was headed by Alexey Gaskarov – a former defendant in the "Bolotnaya Square case".
53*	Buzuluk	27 June 2017	18 July 2017 (later)	Local supporters	The People's Headquarters closed before the end of the presidential campaign.
54*	Vyksa	27 June 2017	March 2018	Local supporters	
55*	Yessentuki	27 June 2017	26 August 2017 (or later)	Local supporters	The People's Headquarters closed before the end of the presidential campaign.
56*	Gorno-Altaysk	30 June 2017	January 2018	Local supporters	
57	Novokuznetsk	3 July 2017	20 July 2018	Headquarters team (Navalny was serving an administrative arrest on 12 June – 7 July 2017)	
58	Kurgan	3 July 2017	26 April 2021	Headquarters team (Navalny was serving an administrative arrest on 12 June – 7 July 2017)	Worked after the end of the presidential campaign until 30 March 2018. It was restarted on 6 May 2019 and worked until 26 April 2021.
60	Kaliningrad	6 July 2017	26 April 2021	Headquarters team (Navalny was serving an administrative arrest on 12 June – 7 July 2017)	
59	Orenburg	6 July 2017	10 June 2020	Leonid Volkov	After the end of the presidential campaign (since 10 April 2018), he worked for more than a year as a "people's headquarters". It was restarted as an official headquarters on 15 July 2019 and worked until 10 June 2020.
61	Bryansk	14 July 2017	10 November 2020	Headquarters team	Worked after the end of the presidential campaign until 31 March 2018. It was restarted as an official headquarters on 24 August 2019 and worked until 10 November 2020.
62	Syktyvkar	19 July 2017	31 March 2018	Headquarters team	
63	Chita	24 July 2017	30 March 2018	Headquarters team	In March 2021, the restart of the headquarters was announced to participate in the election campaign to the State Duma, which did not take place due to the demand of the Moscow prosecutors to recognize Navalny's headquarters as an extremist organization.
64	Murmansk	26 July 2017	26 April 2021	Leonid Volkov (via video link)	
65*	Berezniki	29 July 2017	11 July 2018	Local supporters	
66*	Vorkuta	29 July 2017	February 2018	Local supporters	
67*	Magadan	30 July 2017	March 2018	Local supporters	
68	Sochi	31 July 2017	31 March 2018	Headquarters team	
69	Kursk	1 August 2017	May 2018	Headquarters team	In March 2021, the restart of the headquarters was announced to participate in the election campaign to the State Duma, which did not take place due to the demand of the Moscow prosecutors to recognize Navalny's headquarters as an extremist organization.
70	Belgorod	2 August 2017	26 April 2021	Headquarters team	After the liquidation of the headquarters, its former coordinator founded the independent political movement "Apoliticality destroys".
71	Orsk	7 August 2017	31 March 2018	Headquarters team	
72	Tolyatti	11 August 2017	30 March 2018	Leonid Volkov	
73	Ulan-Ude	11 August 2017	11 November 2018	Headquarters team	After the end of the presidential campaign, he worked for 7 months and 11 days as a "people's headquarters". In March 2021, the restart of the headquarters was announced to participate in the election campaign to the State Duma, which did not take place due to the demand of the Moscow prosecutors to recognize Navalny's headquarters as an extremist organization.
74*	Korolyov	11 August 2017	31 March 2018	Local supporters	
75	Arkhangelsk	15 August 2017	26 April 2021	Leonid Volkov (via video link)	
76*	Tosno	19 August 2017	30 January 2018	Local supporters	The closure was accompanied by publications in the pro-government media, which reported criticism of the coordinators against the federal headquarters of the campaign.
77	Petrozavodsk	28 August 2017	31 March 2018	Headquarters team	
78	Yakutsk	2 September 2017	March 2018	Leonid Volkov (via video link)	
79	Lipetsk	3 September 2017	26 April 2021	Headquarters team, regional manager	The opening was canceled several times due to pressure on the owners of the premises and eventually took place in the open air. Journalist Andrei Loshak participated in it, among others. Worked after the end of the presidential campaign until 29 March 2018, resumed work as a "people's headquarters" on 6 April
80	Stary Oskol	3 September 2017	31 March 2018	Leonid Volkov (via video link)	
81*	Magnitogorsk	10 September 2017	28 February 2019	Local supporters	
82*	Yeysk	28 October 2017	16 April 2018	Local supporters	
83*	Mytishchi	18 November 2017	15 April 2018 (later)	Local supporters	
84*	Goryachy Klyuch	11 December 2017 (not later than)	29 January 2018	Local supporters	The closure was accompanied by publications in the pro-government media, which reported criticism of the coordinators against the federal headquarters of the campaign.
85*	Kalininsk	7 December 2017	1 February 2018	Local supporters	The closure was accompanied by publications in the pro-government media, which reported criticism of the coordinators against the federal headquarters of the campaign.
86*	Velikiye Luki	19 December 2017	March 2018	Local supporters	
Yellow color marks 5 headquarters that were not included in the final statistics on the website of the presidential campaign.; An asterisk marks 16 "people's headquarters" opened by the forces of local residents.; An asterisk and pink color mark the "people's headquarters", the opening of which did not take place.

== See also ==
- Russia of the Future
- Smart Voting
