= Leonid Volkov =

Russian politician (born 1980)

- Леонид Волков
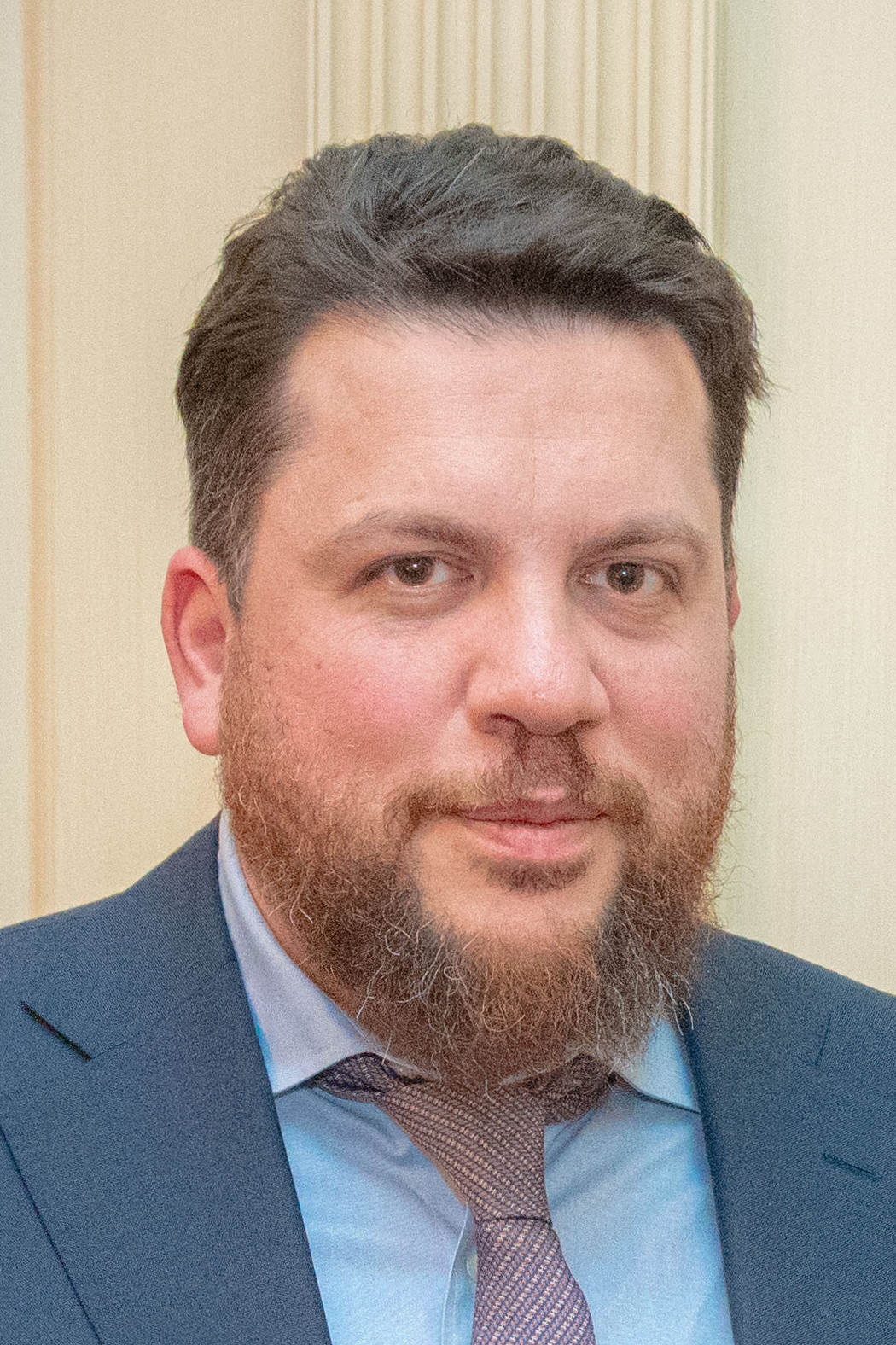
- Volkov in 2023

Member of the Central Council of the Progress Party
- In office December 15, 2012 – May 19, 2018

Chairman of Russia of the Future
- Incumbent
- Assumed office 17 January 2021
- Preceded by: Alexei Navalny

Deputy of the Yekaterinburg City Duma
- In office March 1, 2009 – September 2013

Personal details
- Born: November 10, 1980 (age 45) Sverdlovsk, Soviet Union
- Citizenship: Russia
- Party: Russia of the Future
- Education: Ural State University
- Website: leonidvolkov.ru

Leonid Mikhailovich Volkov (Russian: Леони́д Миха́йлович Во́лков, IPA: [lʲɪɐˈnʲit mʲɪˈxajləvʲɪtɕ ˈvolkəf]; born 10 November 1980) is a Russian liberal politician, IT specialist and mathematician who served as the chief of staff for opposition figure Alexei Navalny's campaign for the 2018 presidential election. He was also the chairman of the Anti-Corruption Foundation until 2023.

From 1 March 2009 to September 2013, he served as a deputy of the Yekaterinburg City Duma. He also served as the chairman of the Central Election Committee created for elections to the Russian Opposition Coordination Council, and was the head of the campaign office of Alexei Navalny's campaign in the 2013 Moscow mayoral election. He is one of the founders of the Russia of the Future party, originally known as the People's Alliance. He was a former chairman of the Sverdlovsk branch and a member of the Federal Political Council of the People's Freedom Party, and a member of the federal political council of the UDM Solidarnost. He was a captain of the Russia-Ural team at the 10th International Young Physicists' Tournament (IYPT) in 1997, a participant in the 2001 World Programming Championship, in which he took 14th place (bronze medals) as part of the Ural State University team.

== Biography ==
Leonid Volkov was born on 10 November 1980 in Sverdlovsk (present-day Yekaterinburg) in the Sverdlovsk Oblast of the Soviet Union. His father is Mikhail Vladimirovich Volkov, professor, Chief Researcher of the Laboratory of Combinatorial Algebra, Institute of Natural Sciences and Mathematics, Ural Federal University. His mother is Susanna Borisovna Volkova (Kupchik), Senior Lecturer of the Department of New Information Technologies in Education, Ural State Pedagogical University. Volkov is Jewish; on official documents, however, his ethnicity is shown as Russian.

On March 1, 2009, he was elected as a deputy of the Yekaterinburg City Duma in the electoral district No. 10 of the Kirovsky district (self-nomination). He became a member of the permanent parliamentary commission on urban economy, urban planning and land use and of the permanent deputy commission on local government, cultural and information policy.

In 2013, he moved with his family from Yekaterinburg to Luxembourg. He returned to Russia at the end of 2014.

Since 2020, Volkov has been living and working in Vilnius, the capital of Lithuania.

On 4 October 2022, his book Putinland was published.

== Political activities ==
Since 2009, he has been a member of the Solidarnost movement. On April 10, 2010, he organized a rally against the construction of a temple on Labour Square in Yekaterinburg — the event gathered more than 3,500 participants and became the largest protest action in the city since perestroika. On October 24, 2010, he was one of the organizers of the rally in support of Yegor Bychkov.

He is a member of the central election committee of the Russian Opposition Coordination Council and was one of the leaders of Navalny's 2013 mayoral campaign for Moscow. He was formerly a member of the political council of the People's Freedom Party. From December 2016, Volkov was chief of staff to Alexei Navalny's 2018 presidential campaign.

In December 2015 Volkov founded the Internet Protection Society (IPS), a NGO that published monthly an Internet Freedom Index, which monitored over-regulation and limitation on human rights by the Russian state and the extent to which international companies such as Google and Facebook comply with state regulatory demands.

On 9 March 2023, Volkov stepped down as the chairman of the board of the Anti-Corruption Foundation after he had admitted to signing a letter on behalf of the Anti-Corruption Foundation in October which asked the European Union for sanctions on Mikhail Fridman to be dropped without consulting his associates. He was replaced with Maria Pevchikh.

In a private message in late December 2025, Volkov expressed his satisfaction with the news of the apparent death of Denis Kapustin, the commander of the Russian Volunteer Corps, a right-wing militia made up of ethnic Russians fighting on Ukraine's side. Lithuania's Migration Department reached out to the State Security Department on January 6, 2026, to request further consultations regarding a potential threat to state security. The department was requested to evaluate Volkov's public statements and review his residency status.

== Attack ==
On 12 March 2024, Meduza reported that Volkov was attacked by a person with a hammer outside his house in Vilnius, Lithuania. According to Navalny press secretary Kira Yarmysh, tear gas was sprayed in Volkov's eyes and he was beaten repeatedly with a hammer. The politician and lawyer Ivan Zhdanov told the media that Volkov survived the attack, which is being investigated as political terror. In his first interview following the attack, Volkov stated that he would "never give up" his struggle against Putin.

Lithuanian authorities said they suspected Russian special services of responsibility. In September 2024, associates of Navalny said they had obtained evidence that Leonid Nevzlin, a Russian-Israeli billionaire and former co-owner of Yukos, had ordered the attack and failed to pay $250,000 to those he hired to carry it out. Nevzlin denied the accusations, suggesting that it was "concocted in Moscow". That same month, a Russian lawyer and former Gazprom-Media director accused of helping organise the attack was arrested in Poland.

== Personal life ==
Leonid Volkov has been married twice. In 2007, he married Natalia Gredina; the marriage produced a son, Boris (2009), and a daughter, Margarita (2012).

In 2015, he married Anna Biryukova, head of the sociological service of the Anti-Corruption Foundation. They have a son, Mark (2017). In 2020, after Biryukova underwent conversion to Judaism, the couple held a second wedding ceremony according to Jewish rites. In March 2022, the couple had a daughter, Maya.

His brother, Yevgeny Volkov, lives in Yekaterinburg and works as an architect. He is involved in the architectural group “Podělniki,” which is restoring the constructivist landmark known as the “White Tower”.

He describes himself as a Jewish nationalist.
