= Ivan Zhdanov =

Russian politician and lawyer

- Иван Жданов
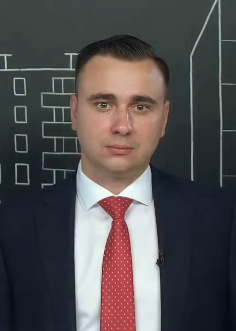
- Zhdanov in 2018

Secretary of the Central Council of Russia of the Future
- In office 19 May 2018 – 28 March 2019
- Preceded by: Alexei Navalny (as Chairman of the Party of Progress)
- Succeeded by: Alexei Navalny (as Chairman of Russia of the Future)

Personal details
- Born: 17 August 1988 (age 38) Moscow, Russian SFSR, Soviet Union
- Citizenship: USA
- Party: Russia of the Future
- Education: Kutafin Moscow State Law University (2010)
- Website: izhdanov.ru

Ivan Yurievich Zhdanov (Russian: Иван Юрьевич Жданов; born 17 August 1988) is a Russian politician and lawyer. He was the director of the Anti-Corruption Foundation (FBK) and is a member of the Central Council of the Russia of the Future political party.

== Biography ==
Ivan Zhdanov was born on 17 August 1988 in Moscow into a military family. In 2005, he entered the Moscow State Law University, from which he graduated in 2010, and was also a graduate student there until 2013.

After practicing in the Federal Antimonopoly Service and the State Duma apparatus in 2011—2013, he was engaged in his own legal practice, headed the regional branch of the People's Alliance political party in the Nenets Autonomous District.

In 2014, he began working at the Anti-Corruption Foundation as a lawyer, and later was appointed head of the legal department of FBK. He worked in Rostov-on-Don.

During the election campaign in Novosibirsk in 2015, a criminal case was opened against Ivan Zhdanov under Art. 142 of the Criminal Code of the Russian Federation "Falsification of electoral documents, referendum documents."

In 2016, he was registered as a self-nominated candidate to the Council of Deputies of the Barvikhinskoye rural settlement. During the pre-election campaign, a criminal case was opened against Ivan Zhdanov for alleged evasion of military service (part 1 of article 328 of the Criminal Code of Russia), and searches were conducted in his apartment.

Subsequently, the elections were canceled by the Central Election Commission of the Russian Federation (CEC); representatives of the FBK linked the cancellation of the elections with the complaints they filed regarding early voting, but the head of the CEC said that the elections were canceled for completely different reasons.

Zhdanov said that the cancellation of the election results is a confirmation of the rightness of the candidates from the Anti-Corruption Foundation.

=== Navalny's presidential campaign ===
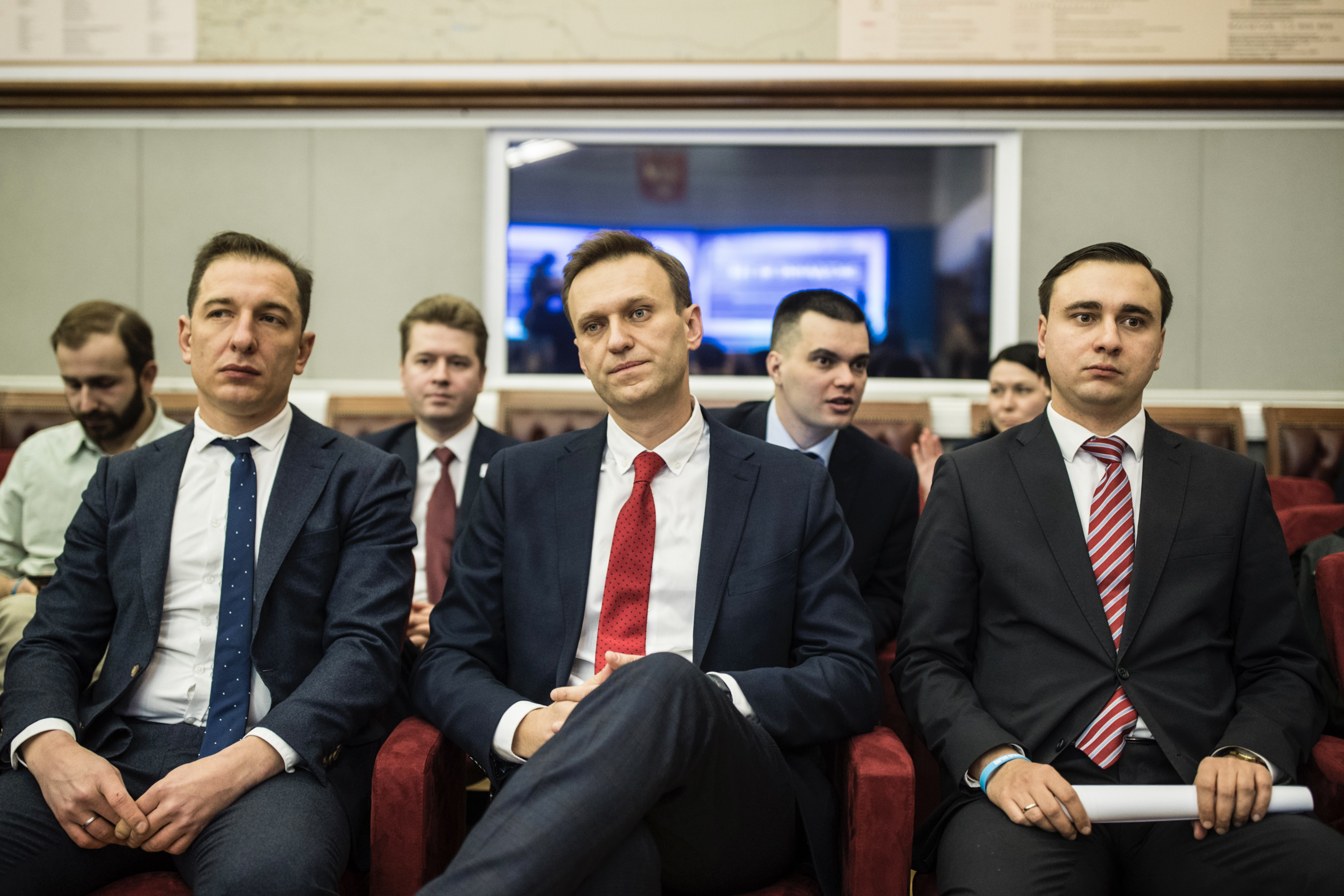
Roman Rubanov, Alexei Navalny and Zhdanov at the Central Election Commission's session

In 2017 and 2018, Zhdanov took part in the election campaign for the admission to the presidential election of Alexei Navalny. Several times during the campaign he defended the head of Navalny's headquarters, Leonid Volkov, in court, who was brought to administrative responsibility for alleged "repeated violation of the order of organizing a public event." He chaired the meeting to nominate Navalny as a candidate.

From 19 May 2018, to 28 March 2019, he was the Secretary of the Central Council of the Russia of the Future.

On 24 May 2018, he was detained in Moscow on suspicion of violating the rules of organizing or holding a rally, "He's Not our Tsar", on 5 May. He faced 10 days of administrative arrest. However, on 5 May Zhdanov was at an authorized rally in Rostov-on-Don and did not write a single tweet about the rally. Subsequently, the Tverskoy Court of Moscow fined Zhdanov 20 thousand rubles.

On 25 October, Zhdanov was again detained in Moscow. On 27 October, the Simonovsky Court of Moscow fined Zhdanov 250 thousand rubles for participating in an online broadcast of actions against raising the retirement age on 9 September.

Since December 2018, he has been appointed director of the Anti-Corruption Foundation. Vyacheslav Gimadi was appointed the new head of the legal department.

=== 2019 Moscow City Duma election ===
He was a self-nominated candidate for deputies of the Moscow City Duma in the 2019 elections in electoral district No. 8 (Airport, Voikovsky, Koptevo, Sokol).

The election headquarters of the candidate was headed by Boris Zolotarevsky, coordinator of Navalny's Chelyabinsk headquarters. The team managed to collect about 5,700 signatures (enough to be submitted to the district election commission), which were submitted on 6 July. According to the results of the verification, the employees of the election commission 100% declared that 1180 out of 5700 signatures are invalid, which is 21% of the total number of signatures, with 10% of "defective" signatures allowed, this was the reason for removing Zhdanov from the election race.

Zhdanov, along with a number of other opposition candidates, did not agree with the results of the signature verification, declared the rejection of signatures was illegal, pointing to the political motivation of the decision to prevent opposition candidates from running for the elections. After that, he, together with other opposition candidates, participated in daily protests, and also spoke at a rally on Sakharov Avenue on 20 July for the admission of all opposition candidates to the city duma elections. He took part in single pickets for admitting independent candidates to the elections, for which he was also detained and released without drawing up a protocol on 22 July.

On the night of 25 July, police officers came to Zhdanov's apartment with a search, and on the same night took him away for interrogation within the framework of a criminal case initiated the day before under Article 141. On 27 July, he was arrested in the morning before the start of the action.

By evening, he and other unregistered candidates were released. The second time that day he was detained by the police at Trubnaya Square. On 29 July, the court arrested Zhdanov for 15 days, after which, contrary to the law, he was taken to serve his arrest in another region — the Moscow region, the city of Lyubertsy.

On 2 August, the Moscow City Court recognized as legal the refusal to register Ivan Zhdanov as a candidate for the Moscow City Duma, despite the fact that the certificate of the Ministry of Internal Affairs contradicted the agreement between the CEC and the Ministry of Internal Affairs (the court decided that the agreement was of a recommendatory nature, and it was impossible to disclose personal data from the database of the Ministry of Internal Affairs), as well as refused to consider confirmation of Muscovites that they really gave a signature for Zhdanov. In response, Zhdanov went on a hunger strike: "I no longer have any ways and opportunities to convey my position. From that day on, I go on a hunger strike and refuse to eat. I will not answer any more questions, I refuse to participate in this hearing."

On 19 August, Zhdanov said: "Obviously and one hundred percent I will not be on the ballot paper for the Moscow City Duma elections in the 8th district (Sokol, Airport, Voikovsky, Koptevo)" and asked all his supporters in the district to support opposition candidate Darya Besedina. Leonid Volkov said that Smart Voting also supports Besedina.

On 6 December, Ivan Zhdanov was detained for participating in a rally that took place on 14 July near the building of the Moscow City Electoral Commission. The court appointed him 10 days of administrative arrest. On 16 December, Zhdanov was again detained at the exit from the special detention center, but was soon released.

=== 2021 State Duma elections ===
On 16 December 2019, Zhdanov announced his intention to run as a deputy in the 2021 Russian legislative election. He also added that he made this decision while arrested.

== Criminal cases ==
On 22 August 2019, a criminal case was initiated against Ivan Zhdanov under Part 2 of Article 315 of the Criminal Code "Failure to enforce a court verdict, court decision or other judicial act", due to the fact that he "does not execute the court decision and does not remove the film He Is Not Dimon to You", despite the fact that the film was posted on Navalny's personal YouTube channel.

Earlier, because of the same film, a criminal case had already been initiated against the former director of the FBK Roman Rubanov. Also, two more criminal cases were opened — under Art. 141 of the Criminal Code "Obstruction of the exercise of electoral rights or the work of election commissions", as well as paragraph "b" of Part 4 of Art. 174 of the Criminal Code "Legalization (laundering) of funds or other property acquired by a person as a result of a crime".
