= Roman Rubanov =

Russian political activist

- Роман Рубанов
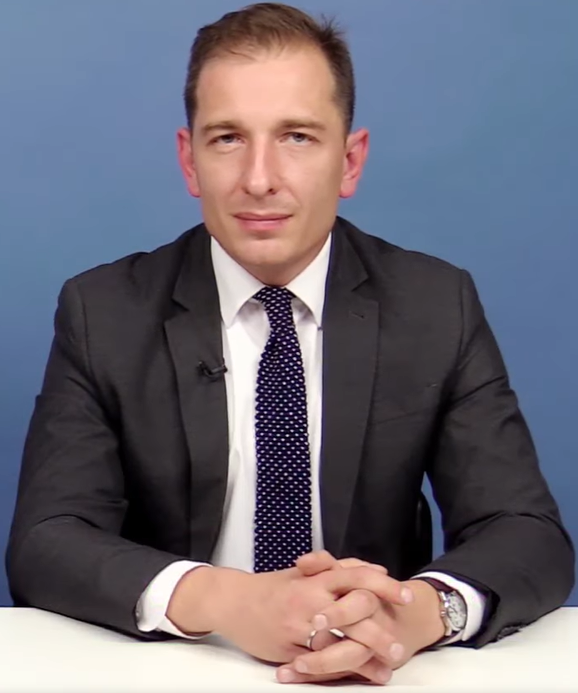
- Rubanov in 2017
- Born: Roman Viktorovich Rubanov; 1 September 1980 (age 45); Vladivistok, Russian SFSR, Soviet Union
- Education: Far Eastern Federal University (2002)
- Occupations: Politician, jurist, head of the Anti-Corruption Foundation (2014–2018), public figure
- Political party: Russia of the Future (2015–2018)

Roman Viktorovich Rubanov (Russian: Роман Викторович Рубанов; born 1 September 1980) is a Russian politician and activist who served as the former head of Alexei Navalny's Anti-Corruption Foundation.

== Biography ==
Rubanov was born on September 1, 1980, in Vladivostok. He graduated from the economics department of Far Eastern Federal University in 2002.

From 2002 to 2012, he worked as auditor at several Russian companies, including BDO Russia. In January–July 2013 Rubanov headed the Fraud Investigation and Prevention Service as Fraud Case Officer at a consulting company.

In January 2013, Rubanov organized the registration of Moscow political activists as members of precinct election commissions with the right to a decisive vote. In February–March of the same year, he acted as coordinator of territorial election commissions in the Moscow mayoral elections, representing the League of Voters. In June, Alexei Navalny appointed Rubanov head of the staff of his electoral campaign to pass the municipal filter in the elections. Rubanov was Deputy Head of Navalny's campaign until September 2013.

In February 2015, he joined the Party of Progress. In early 2016, he was among the candidates for the Barvikha Rural Settlement Council.

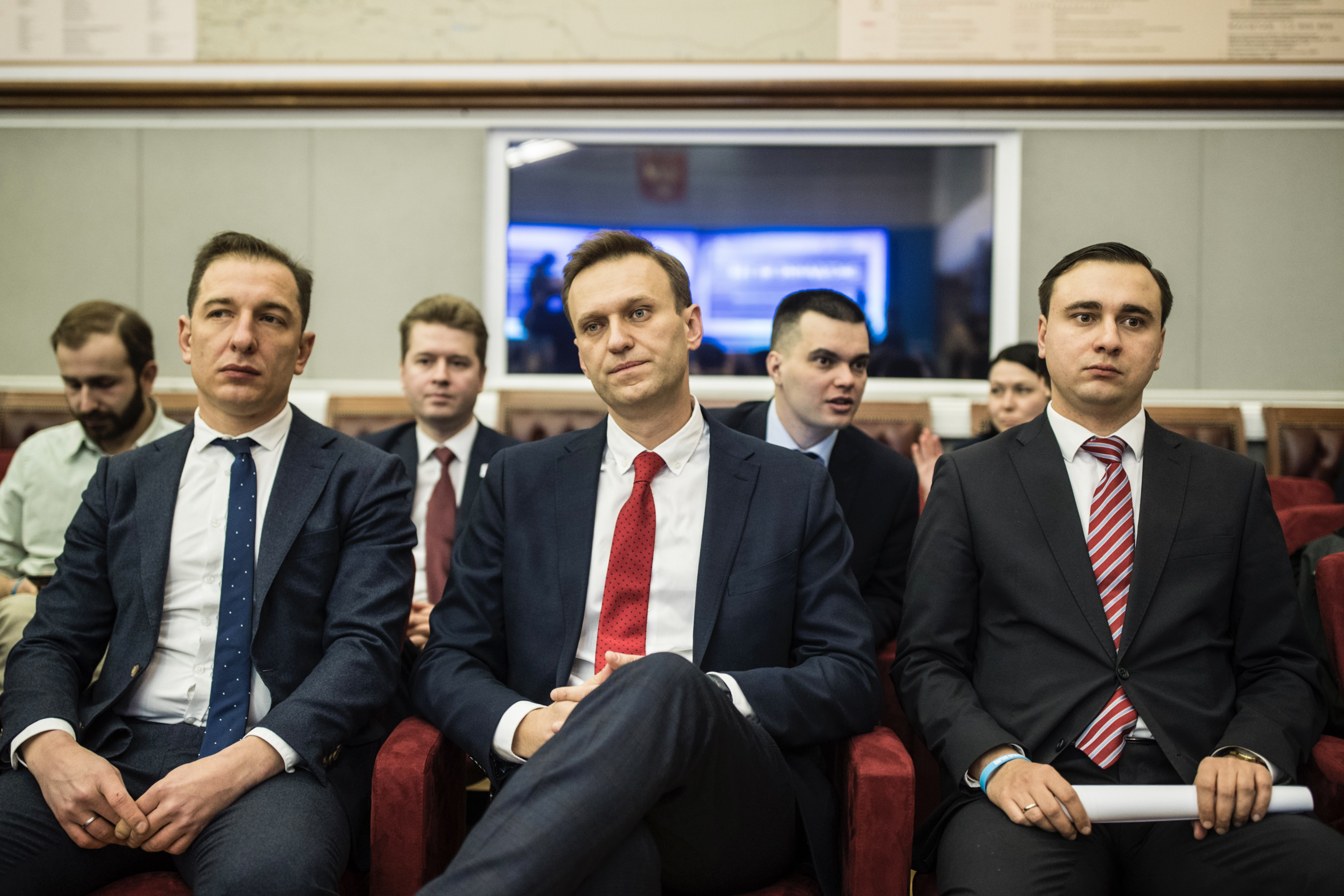
Roman Rubanov, Alexei Navalny and Ivan Zhdanov at a meeting of the Central Election Commission in December 2017

In June 2017, Rubanov was arrested and detained for 10 days for disobeying a police officer's order to start an anti-corruption rally earlier than scheduled on June 12. On October of the same year, he was detained and taken to the Moscow office of the Federal Bailiff Service. The court charged him for failure to comply with a court order to remove the film "He Is Not Dimon to You" from Alexei Navalny's YouTube channel.

On February 20, 2018, he was arrested at Sheremetyevo airport for organizing protests to support Alexei Navalny's candidature in the presidential campaign. Later the same year, he was forced to resign from the post of the FBK’s head and leave Russia. A year later, it became known that the Russian Ministry of Internal Affairs had put Rubanov on the wanted list because of a criminal investigation related to the film "He Is Not Dimon to You".

On June 3, 2022, Rubanov was included in Rosfinmonitoring's register of terrorists and extremists.
