= Alexei Navalny 2013 mayoral campaign =

2013 political campaign

Alexei Navalny mayoral campaign, 2013
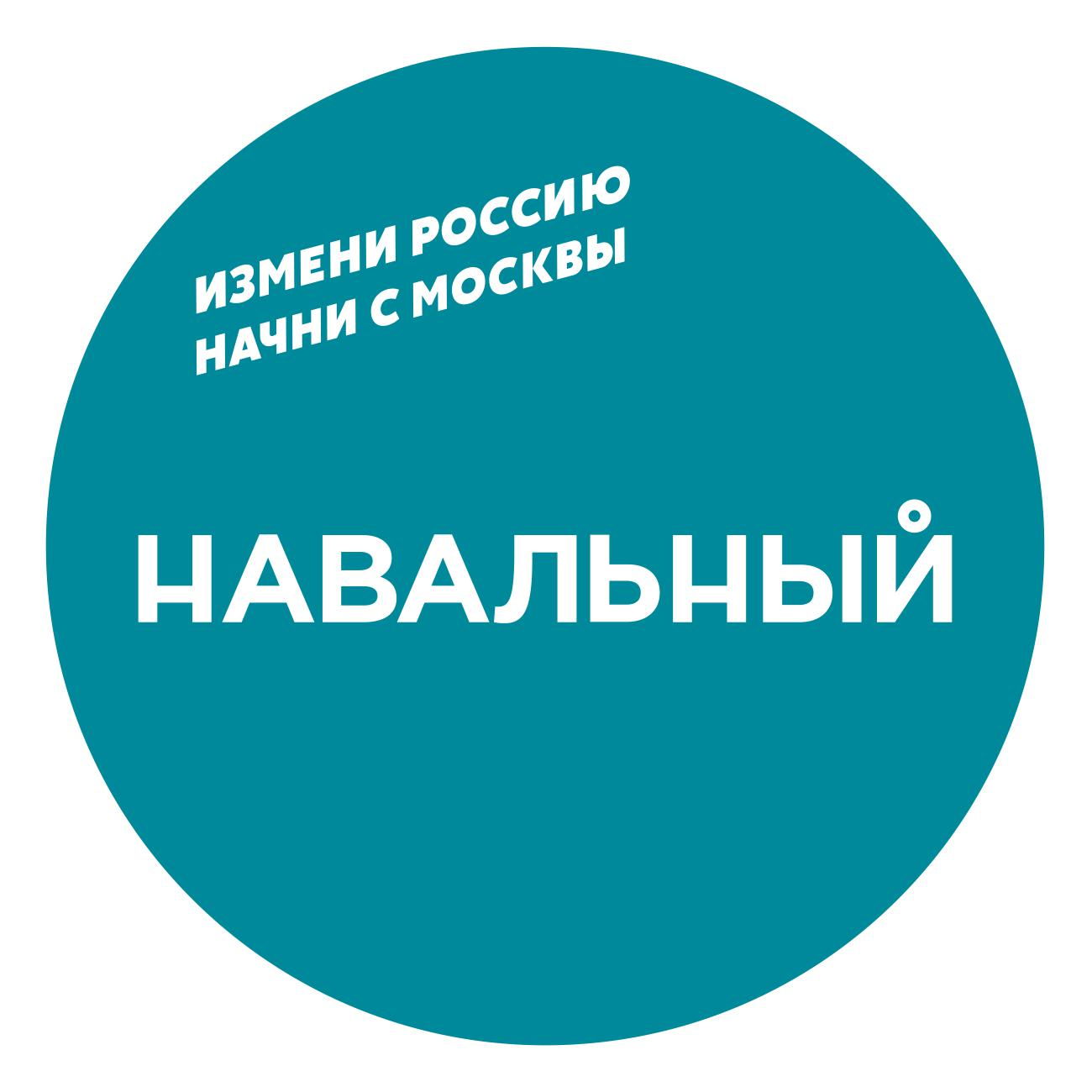
- Campaign: 2013 Moscow mayoral election
- Candidate: Alexei Navalny
- Affiliation: Republican Party of Russia – People's Freedom Party
- Status: Announced; 3 June 2013; Lost election: 8 September 2013
- Slogan(s): Change Russia, Start with Moscow

In 2010, after the long-standing mayor of Moscow Yuri Luzhkov's resignation, then-President of Russia Dmitry Medvedev appointed Sergey Sobyanin for a five-year term. After the protests sparked in December 2011, Medvedev responded to that by a series of measures supposed to make political power more dependent on voters and increase accessibility for parties and candidates to elections; in particular, he called for re-establishing elections of heads of federal subjects of Russia, which took effect on June 1, 2012. On February 14, 2013, Sobyanin declared the next elections would be held in 2015, and a snap election would be unwanted by Muscovites, and on March 1, he proclaimed he wanted to run for a second term as a mayor of Moscow in 2015.

== Declaration of an upcoming election ==
On May 30, 2013, Sobyanin argued an elected major is an advantage for the city compared to an appointed one, and on June 4, he announced he would meet the President Vladimir Putin and ask him for a snap election, mentioning the Muscovites would agree the governor elections should take place in the city of Moscow and the surrounding Moscow Oblast simultaneously. On June 6, the request was granted, and the next day, the Moscow City Duma appointed the election on September 8, the national voting day.

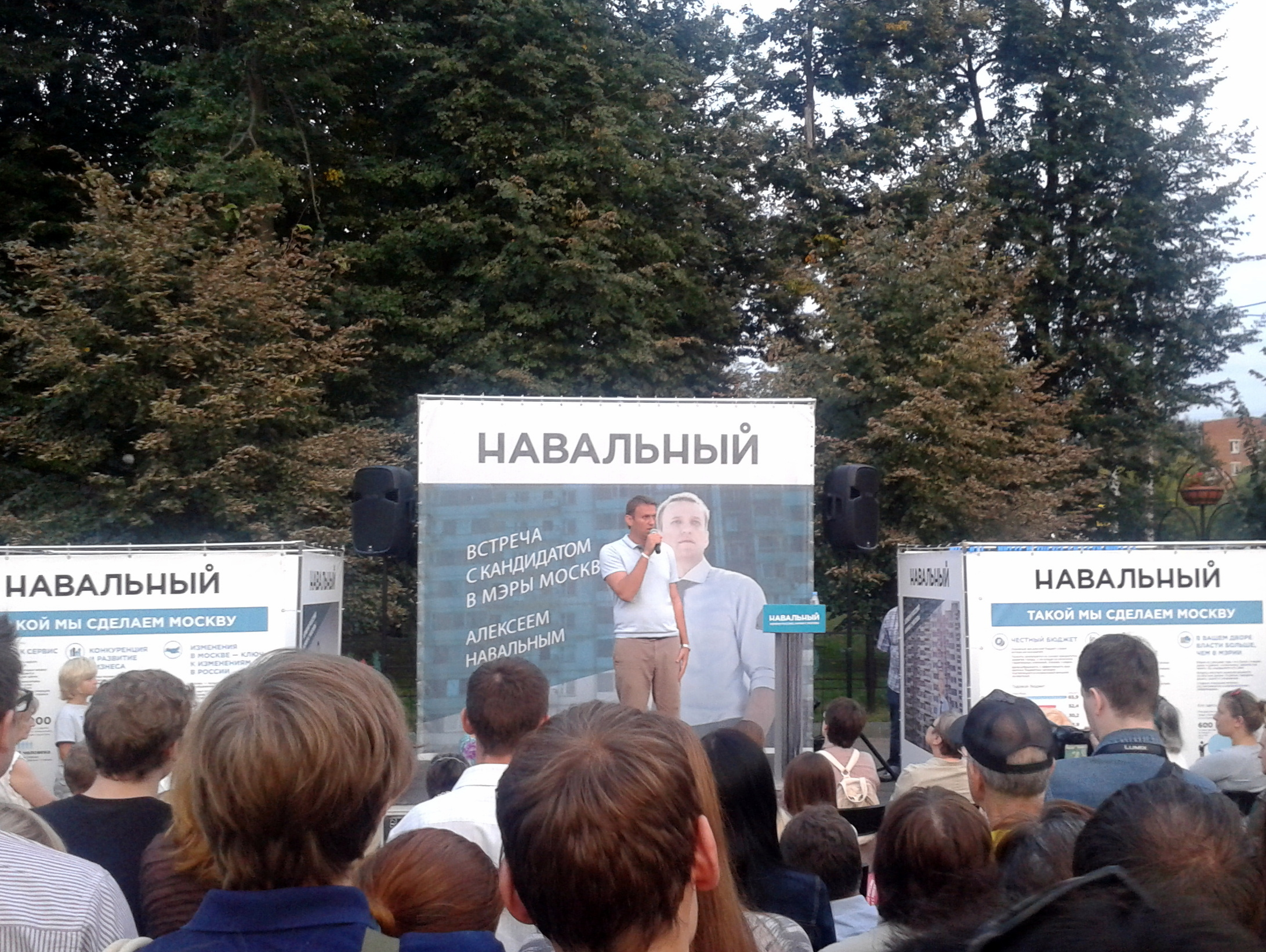
Navalny in front of his electorate, agitating Muscovites to vote for him

On June 3, Navalny announced he would run for the post. To become an official candidate, he would need either seventy thousand signatures of Muscovites or to be pegged for the office by a registered party, and then collect 110 signatures of municipal deputies from 110 different subdivisions (three quarters of Moscow's 146). Navalny chose to be pegged by a party, RPR-PARNAS (which did peg him, but this move sharpened relations within the party; after one of its three co-chairmen and the original founder, Vladimir Ryzhkov, had left the party, he said this had been one of the signs the party was "being stolen from him"). Among the six candidates who were officially registered as such, only two (Sobyanin and Communist Ivan Melnikov) were able to collect the required number of the signatures themselves, and the other four were given a number of signatures by the Council of Municipal Formations to overcome the requirement (Navalny accepted 49 signatures, and other candidates accepted 70, 70, and 82 ones).

On July 17, Navalny was registered as one of the six candidates for the Moscow mayoral election. However, on July 18, he was sentenced for a five-year prison term for the embezzlement and fraud charges that were declared in 2012. Several hours after his sentencing, he pulled out of the race and called for a boycott of the election. However, later that day, the prosecution office requested the accused should be freed on bail and travel restrictions, since the verdict had not yet taken legal effect, saying they had previously followed the restrictions, Navalny was a mayoral candidate, and an imprisonment would thus not comply with his rule for equal access to the electorate. On his return to Moscow after being freed pending an appeal, he vowed to stay in the race. The Washington Post has speculated that his release was ordered by the Kremlin in order to make the election and Sobyanin appear more legitimate.

Within some first days after the election was announced, Mikhail Prokhorov, a billionaire who was a political figure that only appeared two years before the election, was considered as a potent candidate: a Levada Center poll shows that as of June 13, he was capable of a rating of 12%, whereas Navalny had only 3%. It had been suggested by Nezavisimaya Gazeta Navalny and Prokhorov would fight over the same electorate. However, Prokhorov was not able to participate in the election, because he had businesses outside of Russia and had too little time to sell them, and Navalny, along with Sobyanin, was a main beneficiary of this, according to a Levada Center vice director Alexei Grazhdankin. Prokhorov named the Navalny's trial "political", saying, however, he would be a weak manager for a city such as Moscow.

== Campaign ==
Ratings of Sobyanin and Navalny among those who said they would vote, according to Synovate Comcon polls
Time	Sobyanin	Navalny	Ref
August 29–September 2	60,1 %	21,9 %
August 22–28	63,9 %	19,8 %
August 15–21	62,5 %	20,3 %
August 8–14	63,5 %	19,9 %
August 1–7	74,6 %	15,0 %
July 25–31	76,2 %	16,7 %
July 18–24	76,6 %	15,7 %
July 11–16	76,2 %	14,4 %
July 4–10	78,5 %	10,7 %
June 27–July 3	77,9 %	10,8 %

Navalny's campaign was based mainly on fundraising: out of 103.4 million rubles (approximately $3.09 million as of the election day (Note: According to the exchange rates set by the Central Bank of Russia for September 8, 2013)), the total size of his electoral fund, 97.3 million ($2.91 million) were transferred by individuals throughout Russia; such a number is unprecedented in Russia. It achieved a high profile through an unprecedentedly large campaign organization that involved around 20,000 volunteers who passed out leaflets and hung banners, as well as several campaign rallies a day around the city; they were the main driving force for the campaign. The New Yorker described the resulted campaign as "a miracle", along with Navalny's release on July 19, the fundraising campaign, and the personality of Navalny himself. The campaign received very little television coverage and did not utilize billboards; Navalny accused Sobyanin for the former, calling for a TV Tsentr debate (he stated the channel is subsidized by the city and criticized it for not holding debates; in the end of the campaign, he called this and a number of other federal channels to give him some coverage, which was ignored by all of them).

During the campaign, Navalny claimed Sobyanin's paving roads with stones and plantation in the city showed corruption, and he claimed Sobyanin and his city workers steal Navalny banners. Later, he announced the younger of the Sobyanin's daughters acquired a 173 million rubles ($5.27 million) worth apartment, claiming this service apartment could not be legally privatized by Sobyanin. He also claimed the other Sobyanin's daughter owned a 116 million rubles ($3.53 million) worth apartment and an approximately $2.34 million wort one, correspondingly, and her own business's clients were only the ministries where her father serviced. He also asked Sobyanin to show a presidential written agreement with him being able to run for the term after he had just resigned, quoting a law on elections, suggesting such a document would be published if it existed. The next day, pending no satisfactory reply, he applied to a court to delete Sobyanin from the list of candidates; later that day, the document was published.

Navalny himself was blamed for having founded a firm in Montenegro, which was legally "active" during the elections. Head of his campaign office Leonid Volkov originally suggested the information was added by hackers, but both Navanly and Volkov later stated the statement was "preliminary". Navalny explained he had the idea of starting a building business in the country in 2007, an idea he rejected far before the company was even founded. He ordered a graphologist expertise, which showed Navalny's signature in the documents of founding the firm was fake.

Thanks to Navalny's strong campaign (and Sobyanin's weak one), his result grew over time, weakening Sobyanin's, and in the end of the campaign, he declared the runoff election (to be conducted in none of the candidates receives at least 50% of votes) was "a hair's breadth away".

== Election results ==
The largest sociological companies predicted (Levada Center was the only one not to have made any predictions; the data it had on August 28, however, falls in line with other companies') Sobyanin would win the election, scoring 58% to 64% of the vote; they expected Navalny to receive 15–20% of the vote, and the turnout was to be 45–52%. The final results of the voting showed Navalny received 27.24% of the vote, more than candidates appointed by the parties that received second, third, fourth, and fifth highest results during the 2011 parliamentary elections, altogether. Navalny fared better in the center and southwest of Moscow, which have higher income and education levels. However, Sobyanin received 51.37% of the vote, which meant he won the election. The turnout was 32.03%. The companies explained the differences arose from the fact Sobyanin's electorate did not vote, feeling their candidate was guaranteed to win. Navalny's campaign office's measures predicted Sobyanin would score 49–51%, and Navalny would get 24–26% of votes.

Many experts claimed the election had been fair, the number of irregularities was much lower than those of other elections held within the country, and the irregularities had had little effect on the result. Dmitri Abyzalov, leading expert of Center of Political Conjuncture, added low turnout figures provide a further sign of fairness of the election, because that shows they were not overestimated. However, according to Andrei Buzin, co-chairman of the GOLOS Association, State Departments of Social Security added people who did not originally want to vote to lists of those who would vote at home, with the number of such voters being 4.5% of those who voted, and added this did cause questions if Sobyanin would score 50% if this did not take place. Dmitry Oreshkin, leader of the "People's election commission" project (who did a separate counting based on the data from election observers; their result for Sobyanin was 49.7%), said now that the runoff election was only 1.5% away, all details would be looked at very closely, and added it was impossible to prove "anything" juridically.

Percentages of Muscovites who voted for Navalny during the election

At 00:30, September 9 (the election count night), Navalny published a post saying, "One thousand stations are equipped with ballot paper processing systems, the results for which we were promised to get at 20:30. [...] Since the close of the voting, it has been four hours. We still do not have the turnout data for all voting stations. We still do not have the data for the ballot paper processing systems. But just five days ago, it was set in stone 'preliminary voting results of the Moscow mayoral elections will be known on September 8, at 22:00, and the name of the new mayor of Moscow will be announced before the midnight'. What is going on, dear Sergey Semyonovich [Sobyanin] and Vladimir Vladimirovich [Putin]? You cried the vote counting would be fair. Do not be afraid on the runoff election – it is not scary". Later that day, Navalny publicly denounced the tally, saying, "We do not recognize the results. They are fake". Sobyanin's office rejected an offer of a vote recount. Navalny threatened to rally his followers if a runoff election was not held. His supporters cited election irregularities, such as a longer-than-expected vote tallying period. On September 12, Navalny addressed the Moscow City Court to overturn the result of the poll; the court rejected the assertion. Navalny then challenged the decision in the Supreme Court of Russia, but the court recognized the result of the election to be legitimate.

== Reception ==
The reaction to Navalny's mayoral election result was mixed: Nezavisimaya Gazeta declared, "The voting campaign turned a blogger into a politician", and following an October 2013 Levada Center poll that showed Navalny made it to the list of potential presidential candidates among Russians, receiving a rating of 5%, Konstantin Kalachev, the leader of the Political Expert Group, declared 5% was not the limit for Navalny, and unless something extraordinary happened, he could become "a pretender for a second place in the presidential race". On the other hand, The Washington Post published a column that stated the election was fair so the Sobyanin could show a clean victory, demoralizing the opposition, which could otherwise run for street protests. Putin's press secretary Dmitry Peskov stated on September 12, "His momentary result cannot testify his political equipment and does not speak of him as of a serious politician". (When referring to Navalny, Putin never actually pronounced his name, referring to him as a "mister" or the like; journalist Julia Ioffe took it for a sign of weakness before the opposition politician, and Peskov later stated Putin never pronounced his name in order not to "give [Navalny] a part of his popularity".)

== Notes ==
Exchange rates
