= Russia of the Future =

Political party in Russia

Russia of the Future Россия Будущего
- Chairperson: Leonid Volkov
- Founder: Alexei Navalny; Leonid Volkov
- Founded: 15 December 2012 (People's Alliance); 8 February 2014 (Progress Party); 22 February 2018 (Working Title); 19 May 2018 (Russia of the Future)
- Dissolved: 29 April 2021 (de facto)
- Preceded by: NAROD Movement
- Succeeded by: Navalny Headquarters (2022)
- Headquarters: Ulitsa Leninskaya Sloboda, 19 115280 Moscow, Russia
- Membership (2020): 100,000
- Ideology: Liberalism (Russian); Reformism; Anti-corruption; Pro-Europeanism; Anti-authoritarianism; Anti-Putinism
- Political position: Centre
- National affiliation: Opposition Coordination Council (2012–2013); Navalny Headquarters (2017–2021)

Website
- partyprogress.org

Russia of the Future (Russian: Россия Будущего, romanized: Rossiya Budushchego, IPA: [rɐˈsʲijə ˈbudʊɕːɪvə]), originally known as the People's Alliance (Народный Альянс, Narodnyy Al'yans) and formerly called the Progress Party (Партия Прогресса, Partiya Progressa), is an unregistered opposition political party in Russia founded on 15 December 2012 by Leonid Volkov and later refounded on 19 May 2018 by Alexei Navalny, who was also the founder of the non-profit organisation Anti-Corruption Foundation.

Russia of the Future opposes Russian President Vladimir Putin and the ruling party United Russia. The party's platform stood for the decentralization of power in Russia, cutting the number of government officials, lustration for those responsible for political repressions, the reduction of the president's powers, possibly switching to a parliamentary republic under the rule of law, and ensuring the independence of the judiciary. It also stipulated "drastically reducing" government interference in the economy, ending censorship, prohibiting the government from owning media outlets and abolishing conscription. The foreign policy plan called for introducing visas with Central Asia, stopping support for so-called rogue states and partnering up with Western countries.

According to Navalny's ally Lyubov Sobol, the goals of the party include "real changes, real reforms", including increased property protections, a fair criminal-justice system and battling corruption, "so that money from the budget does not flow into offshores and is not spent on yachts and palaces". The founding session of the party was attended by 124 delegates from 60 of Russia's regions. The party has a seven-member central committee instead of a chairman.

Russia's Ministry of Justice has repeatedly declined registration of the party on the grounds that another party of the same name already existed or due to alleged paperwork errors.

== History ==
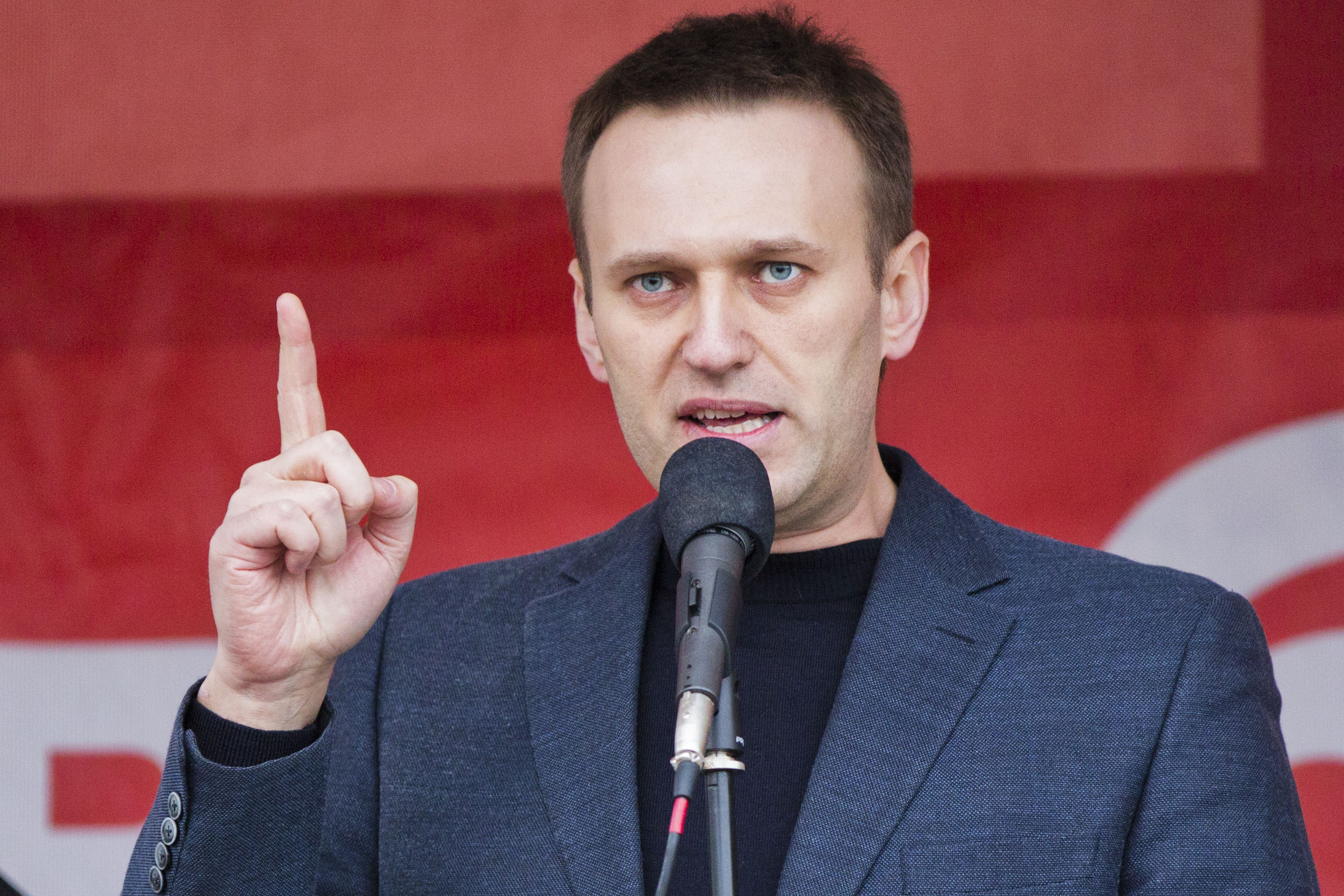
Alexei Navalny was elected as the party's chairman on 17 November 2013

=== People's Alliance ===
People's Alliance logo

The People's Alliance party was founded on 15 December 2012 at the party's founding congress. Initially, Russian opposition figure Alexei Navalny declined to join the political party which was formed mostly by his followers. During the founding congress of 15 December 2012, Navalny said: "People's Alliance is my party, but I don't think that right now People's Alliance needs another member who spends his time torn between the Investigative Committee and some court hearing involving Rosneft. Yet it is my party; it represents my interests". On 30 April 2013, the Ministry of Justice of Russia suspended the registration of the party and then denied its registration on 5 June 2013.

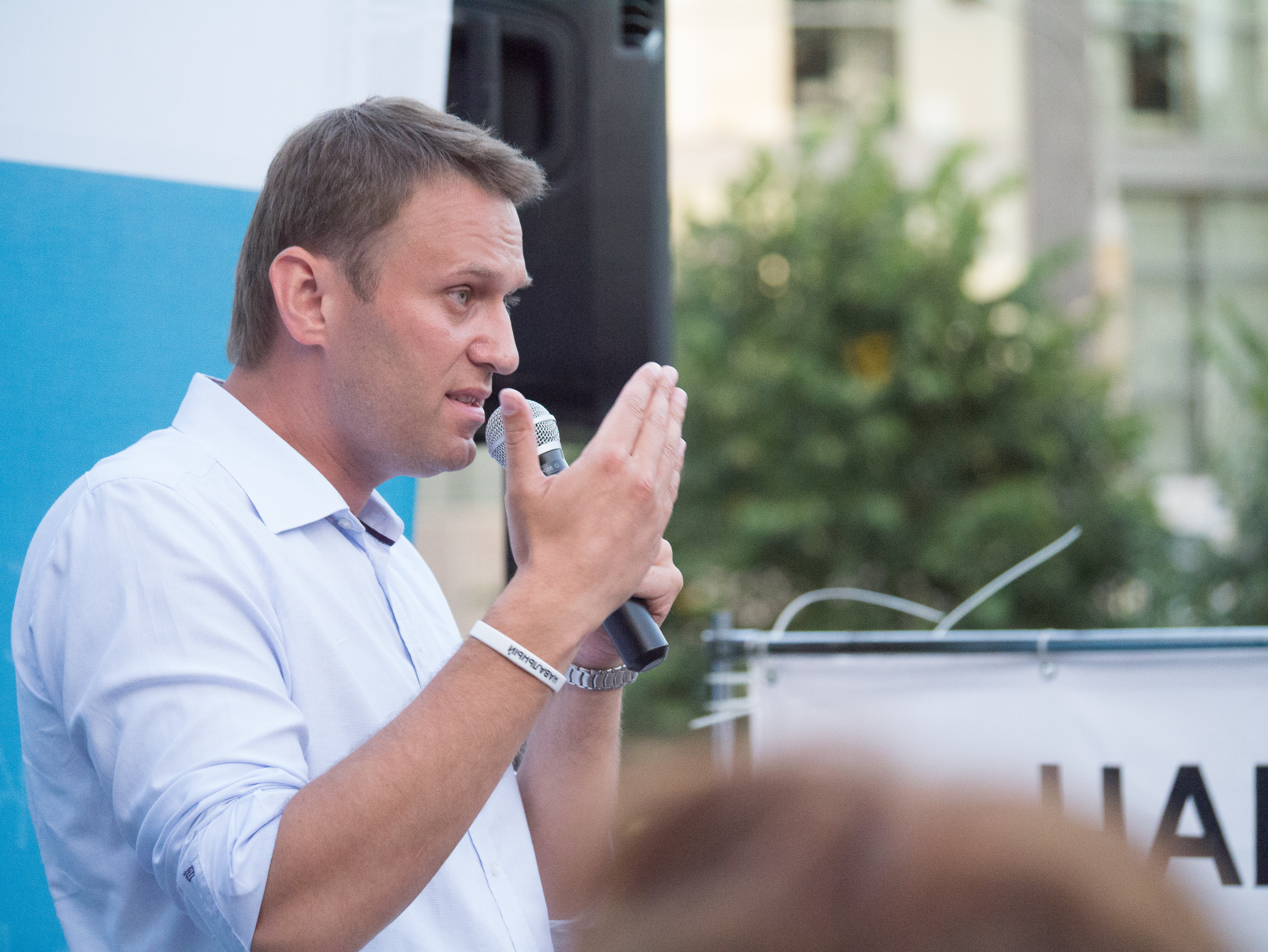
Supported by the Progress Party Moscow, mayoral candidate Navalny got 27% of votes, more than all the other opposition candidates combined

After participating in the 2013 Moscow mayoral election, where Navalny received 27.24% of the vote, or the second highest number, with Vladimir Putin's ruling party candidate Sergey Sobyanin of United Russia receiving 51.37% of the vote, Navalny said that he was ready to lead the People's Alliance. During his visit to the radio station Echo of Moscow on 15 September 2013, Navalny said: "I shall join it, no doubt about that. If I am elected, I shall lead the People's Alliance. I believe that this party is the closest to me. Yet I stayed out of it for the simple reason I was certain that otherwise it would be denied registration for sure". He also expressed his desire to run for Moscow City Duma elections in 2014 together with the People's Alliance party.

On 17 November 2013, the second founding congress of the party was held in Moscow with 111 delegates from 48 regions participating. The 108 delegates from regional branches gave Navalny 88 of the votes and he was elected as the party's chairman. During his address to the delegates, Navalny said that the People's Alliance party will again file a request for registration with the Justice Ministry. At the party's congress on 17 November 2013, Navalny said: "I hope the party will be registered this time. If it is not, we will get a fresh confirmation of the authorities' empty rhetoric about it being tolerant to the opposition taking part in the elections". Later, it was revealed that economic section of party's platform was created by Sergey Guriyev, former Rector at the New Economic School.

On 20 January 2014, the Justice Ministry denied registration to the People's Alliance political party, citing the existence of another organization with the same name.

=== Party of Progress ===
Party of Progress logo

On 25 February 2014, the Progress Party passed the first stage of registration at the Ministry of Justice. For the party to be fit for the election in autumn, the registration process should be completed by mid-June. Before that the Progress Party was required to register at least 43 regional branches, and after that to file a registration application at the ministry again. On 8 April 2014, the Justice Ministry rejected the applications to register the branches of the Progress Party due to the "mistake in constituent documents".

On 28 January 2015, Moscow's Zamoskvoretsky district court declined the party's protest against the refusal of the Justice Ministry to enter it in the register of parties entitled to take part in elections. Party's lawyer Dmitry Krainev's stated: "From 75 registered parties we have become the only one to be pushed aside from the elections".

On 1 February 2015, the Progress Party held a convention that was attended by 62 delegates from 50 regional branches. Despite the fact that Progress Party was not included in the federal list of political forces allowed to run in elections, it decided to prepare for the 2016 elections to the State Duma and regional legislatures.

At the party's congress on 1 February 2015, Navalny stated: "We will continue working for participation in elections. The probability that we won't be allowed to any elections is very high. But work to prepare candidates should be conducted already now in case snap elections are held". On 28 April 2015, the party was deprived of registration and thereby became an association. As reported by Navalny's live channel on YouTube, the activists will try again with the operative name of Working Title (Russian: Рабочее название, romanized: Rabocheye nazvaniye).

On 11 January 2018, Navalny said that the leadership of the association had been trying to register as a party since 2012 and held six congresses to do this. A meeting of the party's organizing committee was scheduled for 17 January 2018, and a founding congress was scheduled for 3 March.

=== Working Title ===
On 22 February 2018, the former deputy coordinator of the Moscow headquarters of the presidential campaign of Alexei Navalny, Vitaly Serukanov, stated on his Facebook page that documents had been submitted to the Ministry of Justice to rename the party Civic Position to Party of Progress. Navalny said that the political strategist Andrei Bogdanov was trying to steal the name of the party from him, as was the case in 2013 with the name “People's Alliance”. On 19 March 2018, the Ministry of Justice registered the renaming of Bogdanov's Civic Position to the Party of Progress.

On 3 March 2018, the founding congress of Navalny's party was supposed to take place under a different name, but on 2 March, an hour after Navalny notified the Ministry of Justice of the time and place of the congress, the owner of the premises announced the termination of the contract due to the position of the building's owner. She also said that, in addition to the contract, there are "forces" that are "beyond the control of even the general director", while mentioning that the owner is associated with the government. As a result, the party congress did not take place.

On 29 March, a notification was sent to the Ministry of Justice on the formation of an organizing committee in order to prepare, convene and conduct the founding congress of the Working Title party. Navalny said that first the party will be registered under this name, and later it will be renamed.

=== Russia of the Future ===
On 19 May 2018, the founding congress of the Russia of the Future party was held, at which delegates also voted for the adoption of a new charter. Ivan Zhdanov was elected head of the party (secretary of the Central Council of the party). The council also included Ruslan Shaveddinov, Roman Rubanov, Georgy Alburov, Lyubov Sobol, and others. On 18 July, Navalny said that the Ministry of Justice had suspended registration of the party's creation on 10 July 2018 until 10 October 2018, having identified eight violations in the charter.

On 6 August 2018, Navalny's supporters again submitted documents to the Ministry of Justice to resume the registration of Russia of the Future, announcing the holding of a congress and 55 regional meetings. On 27 August 2018, the party was denied registration.

On 20 February 2019, Novaya Gazeta published information that the organizing committee would again hold a constituent congress on 28 March. For the ninth time, the founding congress, during which a new Central Council of the party and a chairman was also elected, was held on 28 March 2019 in the town of Tarusa in the Kaluga Oblast. The party was again headed by Navalny. On 16 May, Anti-Corruption Foundation lawyers for the ninth time submitted documents on registration of the party to the Ministry of Justice, having created 56 regional branches. On 27 May 2019, the Ministry of Justice denied registration to the party for the ninth time; this time because a party called Russia of the Future already existed. Despite this, it was not possible to find a party with this name in the database of the Ministry of Justice. Prior to this, the Ministry of Justice had twice registered organizations with the same names as Navalny's parties. On 21 September 2020, the spoiler party was liquidated by the Supreme Court. Anti-Corruption Foundation director Ivan Zhdanov said that the case of refusal to register the party had been communicated to the ECHR, and a new submission of documents to register the party is not yet planned. As of January 2021 the party has not been registered.

In April 2021, the Ministry of Justice registered a party with the same name as Navalny's party, which has happened several times before, meaning the party will likely have to change its name again.

On 26 April 2021, Navalny's political network, including the Anti-Corruption Foundation, were ordered to suspend their activities by the Moscow prosecutor office as it sought to have them designated as "extremist organizations". On 29 April, Navalny's team announced that the political network would be dissolved, in advance of a court ruling in May expected to designate it as extremist. According to Leonid Volkov, the headquarters would be transformed into independent political organizations "which will deal with investigations and elections, public campaigns and rallies". The next day, the financial monitoring agency, Rosfinmonitoring, added Navalny Headquarters to the list of "terrorist and extremist" organizations.

== Ideology ==
The party adheres to liberalism along with certain ideas of the welfare state. The party points out that Russia is part of European civilization, in which freedom, self-respect and human responsibility play an important role, and the need for the state to participate in various social relations, including the economy, culture or family, is gradually decreasing. Therefore, in the future and as it develops, according to the party, the Russian state will have to take on the role of an arbitrator, refusing to actively interfere in public relations, but making sure that no one violates the established rules.

As an embodiment of the idea of a welfare state, the party considers the task of overcoming too great economic inequality between Russians, solving the problem of social tension, as well as "the transition to a social world based on the principles of justice and equality before the law of all citizens of Russia."

In the economy, the party adheres to centrist views, according to which it is necessary to avoid both complete freedom of economic relations, which causes too much economic and social inequality, and the distribution of public goods on an equalizing basis, which causes a slowdown in economic and social development.

== Electoral results ==
=== Opposition Coordination Council elections ===
Election	Leader	Seats	Result
2012 (common list)	Leonid Volkov	5 / 30	Majority

=== Presidential elections ===
Election	Candidate	First round		Second round		Result
Election	Candidate	Votes	%	Votes	%	Result
2018	Alexei Navalny	Not admitted to the elections				

=== Moscow mayoral elections ===
Election	Candidate	First round		Second round		Result
Election	Candidate	Votes	%	Votes	%	Result
2013	Alexei Navalny (nominated by RPR-PARNAS)	632,697	27.24%			Lost ✗
2018	Didn't nominate a candidate					

=== Novosibirsk mayoral elections ===
Election	Candidate	First round		Second round		Result
Election	Candidate	Votes	%	Votes	%	Result
2019	Sergey Boyko (Independent, endorsed by Alexei Navalny)	45,576	18.56%			Lost ✗

== See also ==
- Alexei Navalny
- Politics of Russia
- Russian opposition
