= Yekaterinburg City Duma =

Local legislature of Russia

Yekaterinburg City Duma Екатеринбургская городская дума
- 7th legislature

Type
- Type: Unicameral

Leadership
- Chairman: Igor Volodin, United Russia

Structure
- Seats: 36
- Political groups: Government (27): United Russia (27); Supporting (7): LDPR (3); CPRF (2); SRZP (1); New People (1); Opposition (1): Yabloko (1)

Elections
- Voting system: Mixed
- Last election: 9 September 2018
- Next election: 2023

Meeting place
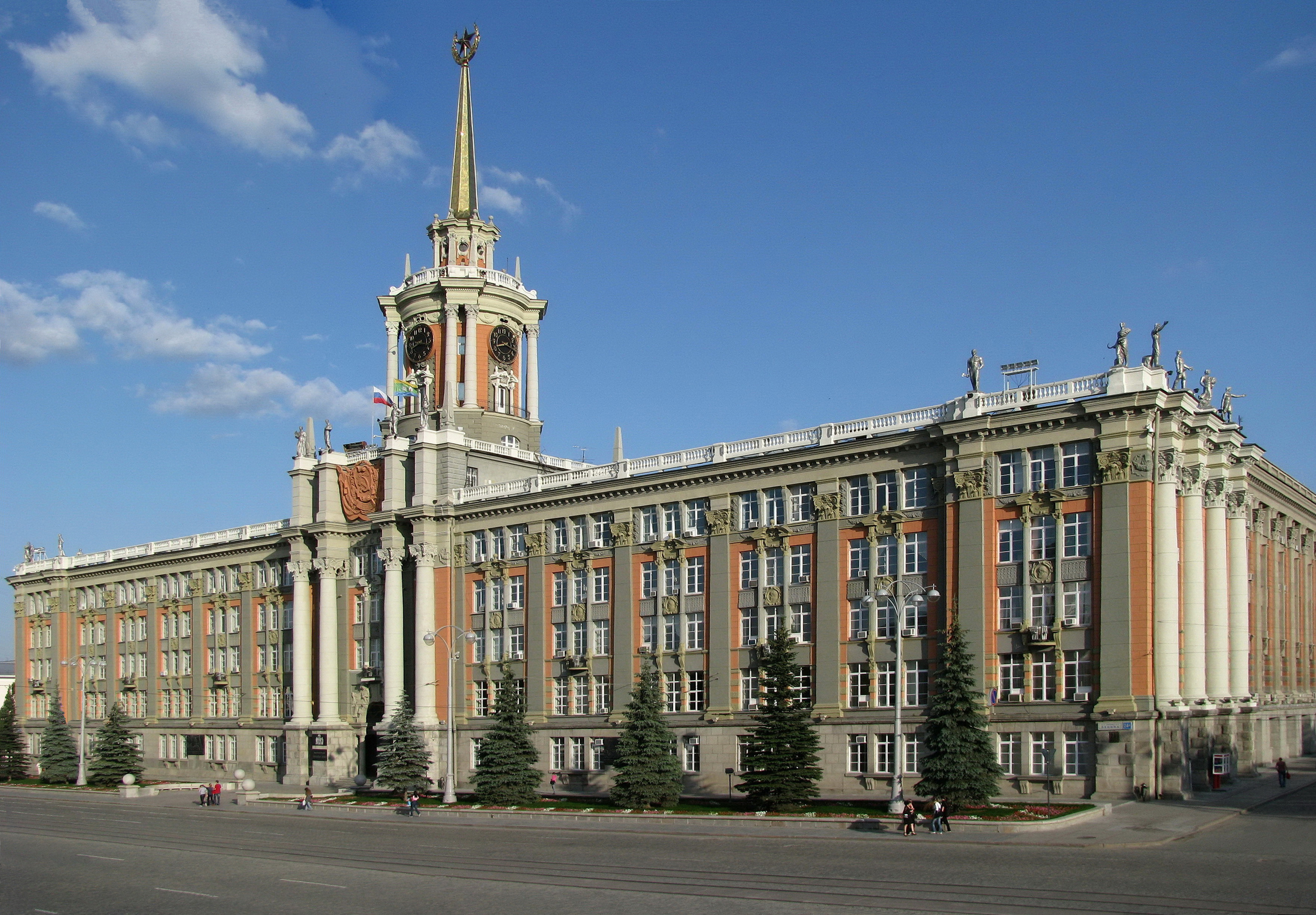
- 24a Lenin Avenue, Yekaterinburg

Website
- egd.ru

The Yekaterinburg City Duma (Russian: Екатеринбургская городская дума, romanized: Yekaterinburgskaya gorodskaya duma) is the city duma of Yekaterinburg, Russia. A total of 36 deputies are elected for five-year terms.

== History ==
Yekaterinburg's city duma was originally established in 1785 as part of Catherine II's reforms on local government, with the first meeting being held in 1787.

== Elections ==
=== 2023 ===
The results after the 2023 Russian elections are as follows:

Party	%	Seats
United Russia	41.87	27
Communist Party of the Russian Federation	12.36	2
A Just Russia	11.14	1
Liberal Democratic Party of Russia	14.60	3
Yabloko	9.24	1
New People	8.50	1
Registered voters/turnout	~20.00	

=== 2018 ===
The results from the 2018 Russian elections are as follows:

Party	%	Seats
United Russia	31.57	19
Communist Party of the Russian Federation	23.02	6
A Just Russia	20.66	7
Liberal Democratic Party of Russia	13.77	3
Yabloko	5.44	1
Registered voters/turnout	26.66	

== See also ==
- November 1917 Yekaterinburg City Duma election
