= Liberalism in Russia =

Within Russian political parties, liberal parties advocate the expansion of political and civil freedoms and mostly oppose Russian president Vladimir Putin. In Russia, the term "liberal" can refer to wide range of politicians, from the centre-right and proponents of shock therapy to left-liberals and progressives. The term "liberal democrats" is often used for members of the far-right nationalist Liberal Democratic Party of Russia. There are Russian opposition and pro-government liberal political parties in Russia. Pro-government liberal politicians support Putin's policy in economics.

There are no liberal factions in Russian parliament at the moment. Centre-left liberalism was represented in the State Duma of Russian parliament by the Russian United Democratic Party "Yabloko" (7.86% in 1993 election, 6.89% in 1995, 5.93% in 1999). Pro-government liberalism was represented by the Our Home – Russia (10.13% in 1995 election), the liberal political party founded by Prime Minister Viktor Chernomyrdin. Centre-right liberalism was represented by the pro-capitalist party Democratic Choice of Russia (15.51% in 1993) and its successor, the Union of Right Forces (8.52% in 1999 election). Yabloko and the Republican Party of Russia – People's Freedom Party are members of Alliance of Liberals and Democrats for Europe Party. Yabloko is also a member of Liberal International. Since Vladimir Putin's rise to power in 2000, many liberal parties and politicians have been persecuted.

== Liberalism in the Russian Federation ==
=== History ===
Liberalism emerged in Russia before the Russian Revolution and continued to develop among Constitutional Democrats such as Pavel Milyukov living in exile after 1917. After the fall of communism, several new liberal parties were formed, but only one of them Yabloko (Yabloko – Rosiyskaya Demokraticheskaya Partiya, a member of Liberal International) succeeded in becoming a relevant force. This is a left-of-center liberal party. The Union of Right Forces (Soyuz Pravykh Sil, a member of International Democrat Union) is a right-of-center liberal party. It can also be seen as a democratic conservative market party. In this scheme, the party is not included as liberal, being considered a democratic conservative party, but it can also be called liberal because of its pro-free-market and anti-authoritarianism stances. The so-called Liberal Democratic Party of Russia is not at all "liberal" – it is an ultranationalist, right-wing populist party.

=== Yabloko (1993–) ===
- 1993: Diverse new political parties merged into the social liberal Yavlinksii-Boldyrev-Lukin electoral bloc, led by Grigorii Yavlinskii.
- 1994: The party is renamed Yabloko (Yabloko).
- 1995: The party is officially registered.
- 2003: The party is renamed Russian Democratic Party Yabloko (Rosiyskaya Demokraticheskaya Partiya/Российская Демократическая Партия Яблоко).

The Yabloko is a member of the Alliance of Liberals and Democrats for Europe Party and Liberal International.

=== Pro-Chernomyrdin and regional party (1995–2000) ===
- 1995: Our Home – Russia was formed.
- 2006: NDR merged into United Russia.

=== Democratic Russia ===
Party family tree
- RPR	PES	DVR	DPR
  VR	SPS	GS
  RNDS	PD
  PARNAS	GP	GS	DV	DPR
  PR
  NP

The Democratic Choice of Russia was a centre-right liberal pro-capitalist political party.

The Union of Right Forces was a Russian centre-right liberal opposition political party.

- 1990: Democratic Party of Russia (DPR) was formed.
- 1990: Republican Party of Russia (RPR) was formed.
- 1992: Party of Economic Freedom (PES) was formed.
- 1993: Choice of Russia (VR) was formed.
- 1994: VR was renamed to Democratic Choice of Russia (DVR).
- 1995: Forward, Russia! was formed.
- 2001: DVR and PES merge to form Union of Right Forces (SPS).
- 2002: Network Party for Support of the Small and Middle Business (RSPMSB) was formed.
- 2002: Forward, Russia! merges into RPR.
- 2004: RSPMSB was renamed to Free Russia.
- 2004: Our Choice splits from SPS.
- 2006: Our Choice merges into Russian People's Democratic Union (RNDS).
- 2007: Free Russia was renamed to Civilian Power.
- 2008: DPR, Civilian Power and SPS merge to form Right Cause.
- 2010: RPR and RNDS merge into People's Freedom Party (PARNAS).
- 2010: Democratic Choice (DV) splits from SPS.
- 2012: DPR and Civilian Power are refounded.
- 2012: Civic Platform splits from Right Cause.
- 2012: People's Alliance is formed
- 2014: People's Alliance renames to Progress Party
- 2016: Right Cause renames to Party of Growth.
- 2017: DV dissolves.
- 2018: Progress Party renames to Russia of the Future
- 2020: New People was formed.
- 2023: PARNAS dissolves.
- 2024: Party of Growth merges into New People.

=== Solidarnost wide movement (2008–) ===
Solidarnost is a liberal democratic political movement founded in 2008 by a number of well-known members of the liberal democratic opposition, including Garry Kasparov, Boris Nemtsov and others from the Yabloko and former Union of Right Forces (which had just merged with two pro-Kremlin parties).

=== Republican Party of Russia – People's Freedom Party (de facto 2010–) ===
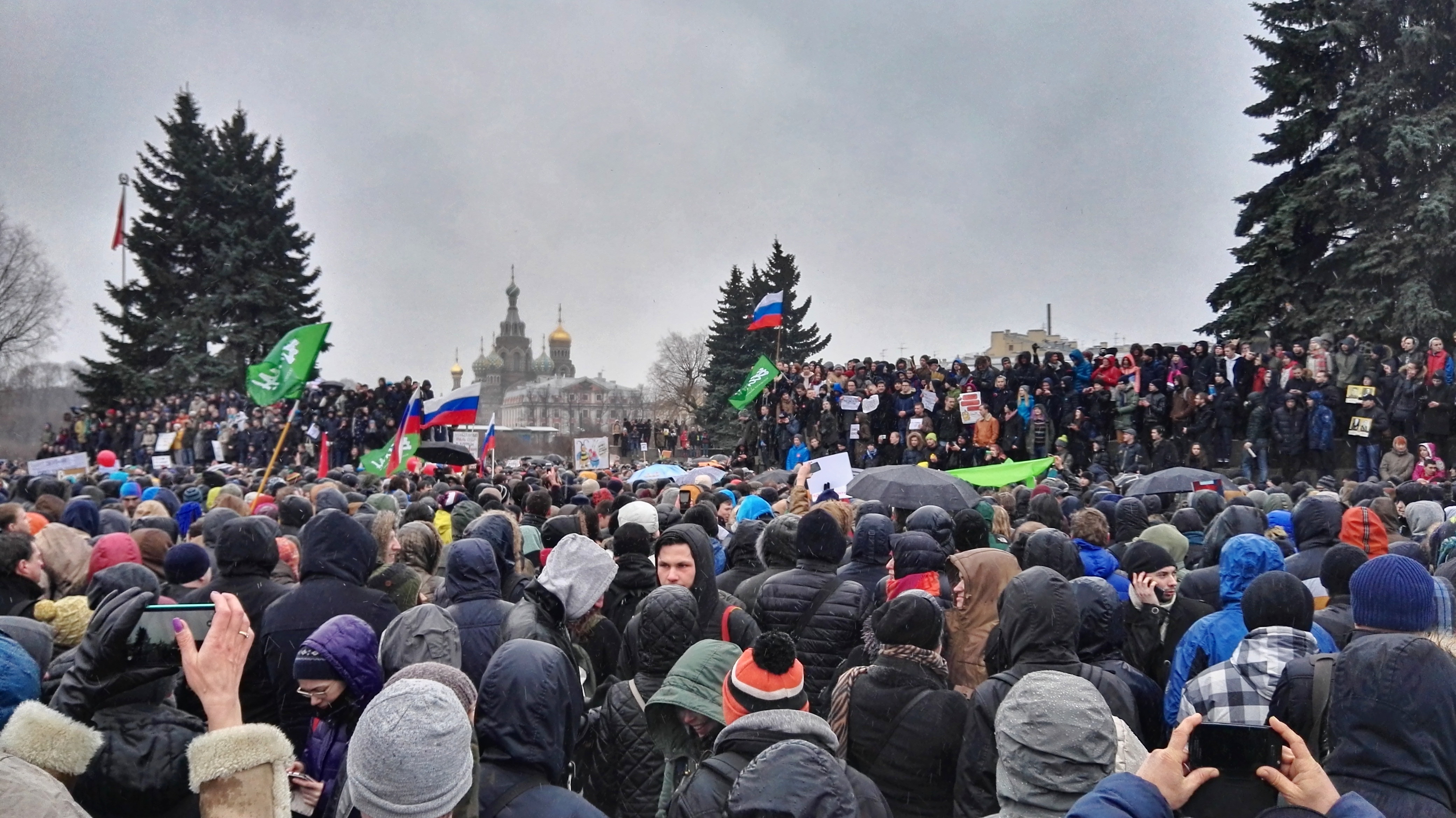
2017 Russian protests, organized by Russia's liberal opposition

People's Freedom Party "For Russia without Lawlessness and Corruption" is a liberal democratic coalition founded in 2010 by opposition politicians Vladimir Ryzhkov, Boris Nemtsov, Mikhail Kasyanov and Vladimir Milov and their organisations Republican Party of Russia, Solidarnost, Russian People's Democratic Union and Democratic Choice. The RPR-PARNAS is a member of Alliance of Liberals and Democrats for Europe Party.

In 2012, the coalition merged into the officially registered Russian political party RPR-PARNAS (Republican Party of Russia – People's Freedom Party).

The RPR-PARNAS is a centre-right liberal opposition political party and it represented in regional parliament in Yaroslavl Oblast.

=== 2022 Russian invasion of Ukraine ===
Most liberal parties, namely Yabloko, People's Freedom Party and Russia of the Future, condemned Vladimir Putin's decision to invade Ukraine. Parts of the movement like New People, however, supported the war which was condemned by majority liberal activists.

== Russian Empire ==
=== Background ===
Mikhail Speransky is sometimes called the father of Russian liberalism. His ideas were discussed and elaborated by such 19th-century liberal republican radicals as Alexander Herzen, Boris Chicherin, and Konstantin Kavelin. Based on their ideals, various early 20th-century liberal parties evolved, the most important of them being the Constitutional-Democratic Party, headed by Pavel Milyukov.

=== From Liberation Union to Constitutional Democratic Party ===
- 1905: The Liberation Union (Soyuz Osvobozhdeniya) merged with the Union of Zemstvo-Constitutionalists (Soyuz Zemstev-Konstitutsionistov) to form the liberal Constitutional Democratic Party (Konstitutsiono-Demokraticheskaya Partya), formally known as the Party of Popular Freedom (Partiya Narodnoy Svobody), led by Pavel Milyukov.
- 1906: A faction forms the ⇒ Party of Democratic Reform
- October 26 O.S., 1917: The party's newspapers were shut down by the new Soviet regime
- November 28 O.S., 1917: Banned by the Soviet regime, the party went underground
- 1918-1920: Many party leaders were active in the White movement
- 1921-early 1930s: The party continued to function in exile, but slowly disintegrated

=== Union of October 17 ===
- 1905: Conservative liberals formed the Union of October 17 (Soyuz Semnadtsatovo Oktyabrya) and became known as Octobrists.
- 1906: A left wing faction formed the ⇒ Party for Peaceful Renewal, the party develops to be the party of the landlords.
- March 1917: Dissolved after the February Revolution.

=== Moderate Progressive Party ===
- 1905: National liberals established the Moderate Progressive Party (Umereno-Progresivnaya Partiya).
- 1907: Merged into the ⇒ Party for Peaceful Renewal.

=== Party of Democratic Reform ===
- 1906: A moderate faction of the ⇒ Constitutional Democratic Party formed the Party of Democratic Reform (Partiya Demokraticheskikh Reform).
- 1912: Merged into the ⇒ Progressive Party.

=== From Party of Peaceful Renovation to Progressist Party ===
- 1906: A left-wing faction of the Octobrists, together with dissidents of the Constitutional Democratic Party and of the Moderate Progressive Party, established the Party of Peaceful Renovation (Partiya Mirnovo Obnovleniya).
- 1912: Merged with the ⇒ Party of Democratic Reform into the Progressist Party (Progresivnaya Partiya), led by Georgy Lvov.
- 1917: Most of the party merged into the ⇒ Constitutional Democratic Party, some continued as the Radical Democratic Party (Radikal'no-Demokraticheskaya Partiya).

== List of various liberal leaders ==
- Russian Empire: Pavel Milyukov, A prominent leader of the Kadets who played a crucial role in advocating for civil rights and constitutional governance.
  - Georgy Lvov
  - Boris Chicherin, A philosopher and legal scholar whose ideas contributed significantly to Russian liberal theory.
- Soviet Union: Andrei Sakharov, A notable dissident and human rights activist who championed civil liberties during the Soviet era.
  - Boris Yeltsin, 1st President of Russia, mostly considered liberal, especially during his early years in office, a famous critic of the Soviet government after 1987.
  - Gavril Popov, 1st Mayor of Moscow from 1991 to 1992.
  - Grigory Yavlinsky, Deputy Premier of the Soviet Union in 1991, leader of social-liberal Yabloko after its dissolution
- Russia: Boris Nemtsov, Deputy Prime Minister from 1997 to 1998, one of the most prominent critics of Vladimir Putin's regime, leader of Union of Right Forces.
  - Alexei Navalny, An outspoken critic of Putin following the death of Boris Nemtsov, chairman of Russia of the Future.
  - Yulia Navalnaya, Navalny's wife and prominent anti-Putin figure in exile.
  - Mikhail Kasyanov, Prime Minister from 2000 to 2004, leading opposition figure, often described liberal both in office and after his dismissial.
  - Leonid Volkov, Navalny's assistant and current exiled leader of Russia of the Future who lives in exile since 2022.

== Conclusion ==
Liberalism in Russia has undergone significant transformations from its early roots to contemporary challenges. While it has faced considerable obstacles from authoritarian regimes, it remains an essential part of Russia's political discourse. The ongoing struggle for civil rights, democratic governance, and economic freedom continues to define the trajectory of liberal movements within the country.

== See also ==
- History of Russia
- Politics of Russia
- Political parties in Russia
