= People's Freedom Party "For Russia without Lawlessness and Corruption" =

Former liberal-democratic political party in Russia

People's Freedom Party "For Russia without Lawlessness and Corruption" Партия народной свободы «За Россию без произвола и коррупции»
- Abbreviation: PARNAS (English); ПАРНАС (Russian)
- Quadrumvirate Chairmen: Mikhail Kasyanov; Vladimir Milov; Boris Nemtsov; Vladimir Ryzhkov
- Founded: 16 September 2010 (coalition); 13 December 2010 (party)
- Dissolved: 16 June 2012
- Merger of: Russian People's Democratic Union; Solidarnost; Democratic Choice; Republican Party of Russia
- Preceded by: The Other Russia
- Succeeded by: Republican Party of Russia – People's Freedom Party
- Headquarters: Moscow
- Membership (2011): 50,000
- Ideology: Liberalism; Anti-corruption
- Political position: Big tent
- European affiliation: ALDE Party
- Colours: White; Blue; Red

Website
- parnasparty.ru

People's Freedom Party "For Russia without Lawlessness and Corruption" (PARNAS; Russian: Партия народной свободы «За Россию без произвола и коррупции»; ПАРНАС; Partiya narodnoy svobody «Za Rossiyu bez proizvola i korruptsiyi», PARNAS) was a liberal-democratic political party in Russia founded on 13 December 2010 by opposition politicians Vladimir Ryzhkov, Boris Nemtsov, Mikhail Kasyanov and Vladimir Milov and de facto dissolved on 16 June 2012 (merged into RPR-PARNAS party). The name is a reference to the original liberal-democratic Party of Popular Freedom.

The party is strongly critical of Putin's regime. Its stated goal is to return Russia to the path of democracy and restore respect for the Constitution. It is also an associate member of the Alliance of Liberals and Democrats for Europe Party. The party has been formed on the basis of a coalition including four organisations:

- Democratic Choice (led by Vladimir Milov)
- Republican Party of Russia (led by Vladimir Ryzhkov)
- Russian People's Democratic Union (led by Mikhail Kasyanov)
- Solidarity (represented by Boris Nemtsov)

A number of Solidarity members have decided not to join the People's Freedom Party, including Garry Kasparov and his United Civil Front, saying that they do not want to participate in unfree elections and waste resources attempting to register an opposition party, which, in their opinion, is impossible. They are also on bad terms with some key members of the Democratic Choice.

In 2011, the European Court of Human Rights ruled that the refusal to register the Republican Party of Russia was unlawful. Since 5 May 2012, the Justice Ministry has restored the state registration of the Republican Party of Russia. On 16 June 2012 on 15th congress of the Republican Party of Russia, PARNAS members joined to RPR and the united democratic opposition party was renamed to Republican Party of Russia – People's Freedom Party (RPR-PARNAS).

== Chronology ==
- On 16 September 2010, the coalition of four movements was created under the name "For Russia without Lawlessness and Corruption".
- On 9 October 2010, the coalition held its first rally in Moscow.
- On 13 December 2010, the party held its founding congress.
- On 28 March 2011, the party released its report Putin. Corruption and started to collect funds for its publication.
- On 16 April 2011, the party held rallies in Moscow and other cities.
- On 23 May 2011, representatives of the party submitted to the Justice Ministry the required documents for its registration. Regional offices had been established in 53 regions of Russia, and the number of members had reached 46.158.
- On 22 June 2011, the party was denied registration.
- On 23 June, the co-chairmen of the party held a press conference in Moscow. They stated that the Duma elections of December 2011 will be illegitimate without the People’s Freedom Party on the ballot list and that they intended to organize a broad protest campaign.
- 24 June, the President of Russia Dmitry Medvedev commented on the refusal to register the party: "Let them remove the 'dead souls', and then they will be registered. No need trying to be registered with irregularities."
- On 25 June, the party held a rally in Moscow under the slogan "Against tyranny! Against corruption! For fair and free elections!" It was attended by over two thousand people. The co-chairmen of the party, Vladimir Ryzhkov, Mikhail Kasyanov, Vladimir Milov and Boris Nemtsov, made speeches saying they considered the refusal of the Justice Ministry illegal and vowed to continue the political struggle. A passionate speech against Putin was delivered by Ilya Yashin. The leader of The Other Russia Eduard Limonov, who came to support the democrats, urged the participants to self-exclude from the voter lists. The actress Natalia Fateyeva informed of her decision to join the party and her example was followed by many others. The participants chanted "Elections without opposition is a crime" and "Down with Putin and Medvedev!"
- On 2 July 2011, the party held an all-Russia conference in Moscow. The participants took the decision not to make new attempts to register with the Justice Ministry and to appeal the refusal to register the party in court. They declared the upcoming parliamentary elections illegitimate and launched a campaign under the slogan "I do not take part in the farce!" Boris Nemtsov suggested an active form of protest: "to come to the polls with a felt pen and cross over the ballot paper". The issue of acceptable forms of party debate was also discussed. In this respect, many participants strongly criticised Democratic Choice, so its leader, Vladimir Milov, temporarily left the hall in protest.
- On 28–29 May 2016 Parnas held primaries, which were won by a majority vote by Vyacheslav Maltsev.

== A suit against Putin ==
On 16 December 2010 Vladimir Putin in a live television broadcast said that in the 90s Nemtsov, Milov and Ryzhkov "dragged a lot of billions along with Berezovsky and those who are now in prison.... They have been pulled away from the manger, they had been spending heavily, and now they want to go back and fill their pockets." In January 2011 Boris Nemtsov, Vladimir Milov and Vladimir Ryzhkov brought the case of Putin's statement before the Moscow City Court, but next month their suit was dismissed. According to the judge Tatiana Adamova, the names of Nemtsov, Milov and Ryzhkov were used by Putin merely as common names to refer to a certain class of politicians.

== Report Putin. Corruption ==
On 28 March 2011 the party released its report Putin. Corruption and started to collect funds from the public for its publication. A special account in Yandex has been opened for this purpose, overseen by a supervisory board of well-known public figures: chief editor of Novaya Gazeta Dmitry Muratov, journalist Oleg Kashin, economist Irina Yasina and writer Oleg Kozyrev. Over a month 1,838,209 roubles were collected. Then the same board held a tender choosing the printing house, which had offered the lowest price for printing of one copy (4.05 roubles). Thus, it will be possible to print 440,000 copies. The distribution of the report began in June 2011. The account remains open, and the fundraising is continuing.
