= Putin. Corruption =

Independent report on alleged corruption

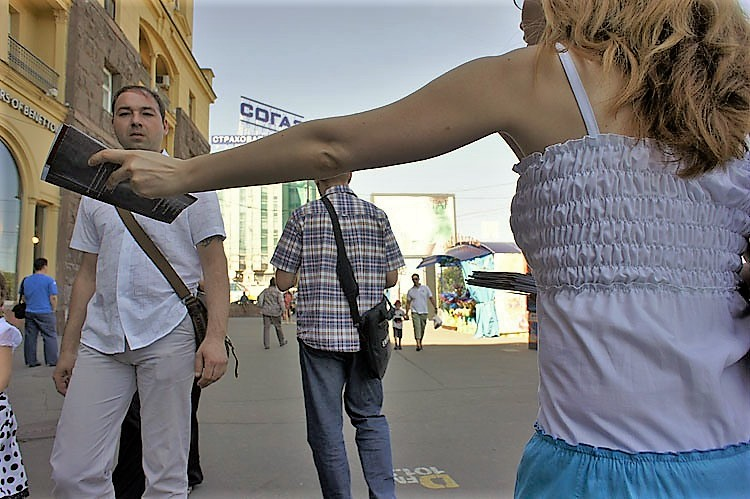
Distribution of the report Putin. Corruption.

Putin. Corruption. (Russian: Путин. Коррупция., romanized: Putin. Korruptsiya.) was an independent report on alleged corruption in Vladimir Putin’s inner circle published by the leaders of opposition liberal democratic People's Freedom Party in Russia. The report was presented by them at the press conference on 28 March 2011. This was the first large-scale project of the People’s Freedom Party.

The report was compiled by co-chairmen of the party Vladimir Milov, Boris Nemtsov and Vladimir Ryzhkov, as well as the press secretary of the Russian Solidarnost (“Solidarity”) movement Olga Shorina.

== Contents of the report ==
The report described the alleged enrichment of Vladimir Putin and his friends, including the 26 palaces and five yachts used by Putin and Medvedev. Table of contents:

- Introduction
- The Enrichment of the Members of the Ozero Dacha Condominium
- Putin and his Billionaire Friends
- Two Slaves on a Gilded Galley
  - Yachts
  - Villas and Palaces
  - Watches
  - Homes and Cars
- Conclusion

== Publication ==
The publication of the report was carried out by means of fundraising from the public. To that end, an account was opened on Yandex.Money, the money transfer service operated by Yandex. The fundraising was overseen by a supervisory board, which included editor-in-chief of Novaya Gazeta Dmitry Muratov, journalist Oleg Kashin, economist Irina Yasina, and writer and blogger Oleg Kozyrev. During first month 1,838,209 rubles was collected.

On 13 April a tender was held to choose the printing house. The winning bid came from the printing house, which offered the lowest price for printing of one copy, 4.05 rubles. Thus, taking into account 3% commission of Yandex, it would be possible to print 440,000 copies.

The account remains open and the fundraising is continuing. The account number is mentioned on the covers of the brochures.

The report is also available on the organisation's website. There, one can find information on the fundraising, news, and videos. On the same site, there are also other reports on Vladimir Putin.

A grey-brown colour was chosen for the cover. According to Vladimir Ryzhkov, it "symbolises the substance flooding over our country and rust, which has covered our state".

== Distribution ==
In June the first batch of the press run on public donations was ready. The distribution was launched on 11 June in Vladimir. The next day, a large distribution of brochures was held in Moscow during the action of "Solidarity" movement dedicated to the Russia Day. Boris Nemtsov participated in both of these events.

On 16 and 17 June police detained opposition activists, who intended to give the report to participants of the St. Petersburg International Economic Forum. The police claimed that the activists held an unsanctioned rally. Another activist was detained on 23 June in Moscow.

== Previous reports ==
Earlier, Boris Nemtsov and Vladimir Milov published the following reports:

- Putin. Results. 10 years. - June 2010. Translated into English as Putin: What 10 Years of Putin Have Brought. This is a revised edition of the report Putin. Results, which came out in 2008.
- Luzhkov. Results - September 2009 (first edition)
- Sochi and the Olympics - April 2009
- Putin and the Crisis - February 2009
- Putin and Gazprom - September 2008
- Putin. Results - February 2008

== See also ==
- Political groups under Vladimir Putin's presidency
