= Maria Drokova =

Russian investor and venture capitalist

Maria Aleksandrovna Drokova
- Мария Александровна Дрокова
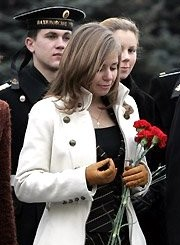
- Drokova in 2006
- Born: October 26, 1989; Tambov, Russian SFSR, Soviet Union
- Other names: Masha Drokova, Maria Bucher
- Occupations: Investor, venture capitalist
- Known for: Founder of Day One Ventures; former spokesperson and federal commissioner of Nashi

Maria Aleksandrovna Drokova (Russian: Мария Александровна Дрокова; also known as Masha Drokova and by her married name Maria Bucher; born 26 October 1989) is a Russian investor and venture capitalist. She is a former federal commissioner and spokesperson of the pro-Kremlin youth movement Nashi (2007–2011) and the founder of the investment firm Day One Ventures.

In 2025, investigative reporting by The New York Times and Byline Times found that Drokova had provided public relations assistance to convicted child sex offender Jeffrey Epstein in 2017.

== Biography ==
=== Early life and education ===
Drokova was born on 26 October 1989 in Tambov. Her father, Aleksandr Pavlovich Drokov, served as a deputy head of the city administration and chairman of the Tambov municipal finance committee; he has been described as one of the wealthiest people in the city. She graduated from school with a gold medal. In 2006, she won the All-Russian School Olympiad in social studies. From 2006 to 2011, she studied at the Faculty of Public Administration at Moscow State University (Department of Political Analysis).

=== Political youth movement ===
In September 2005, at age 15, Drokova joined a political youth movement Nashi. From June 2006 to December 2007, she participated in an ideological youth group associated with Vladislav Surkov and worked as an ideologist for Nashi. In March 2007, she became head of the movement's Moscow HQ and a federal spokesperson.

In 2008, she and other Nashi members received the Medal of the Order "For Merit to the Fatherland" (1st class) "for information support and active public activity in developing civil society in the Russian Federation".

In August 2008, she became a federal commissioner of Nashi and an assistant to a State Duma deputy. From September 2008, she produced the internet channel Russia.ru. In 2009, she gained broader attention after kissing Vladimir Putin at the Seliger forum.

She left Nashi in 2010, and later publicly distanced herself from the movement after moving to the United States. The documentary Putin's Kiss claims she re-evaluated her views after the attack on liberal journalist Oleg Kashin, whom she had known previously. She called for those responsible for the attack to be found and punished.

A documentary about her period in Nashi - Putin's Kiss - received an award for best cinematography at the Sundance festival.

=== Venture and investment activities ===
After leaving Nashi, Drokova worked at companies associated with Serg Bell - Runa Capital and Acronis (as a vice president).

In 2014, Business Insider included her in its list of "50 Best Public Relations People in the Tech Industry," ranking her 46th.

In 2016, she became an angel investor, with investments reported to include Truebill, Acquired.io, MEL Science, DigitalGenius, Chatfuel, Ntechlab, Piper, and HIVE.

In 2017, she moved to the United States and received a green card in the EB-1 visa category.

In January 2018, she founded the venture fund Day One Ventures in California; the fund was also reported to be financed by Serg Bell. In 2019, she was included in the Forbes 30 Under 30 list in the "Venture Capital" category.

In December 2022, U.S. authorities reportedly suspected Bell of possible involvement in the transfer of classified information to Russian state institutions through U.S. startups funded by his venture funds; Drokova's business ties with Bell were mentioned as among the relationships that raised concerns.

On 31 December 2022, she obtained citizenship of Kyrgyzstan.

In 2026, she wrote that she had given up her Russian passport following Russia’s 2022 invasion of Ukraine.

=== Connection to Jeffrey Epstein ===
In November 2025, after the publication of an archive of documents related to Jeffrey Epstein, journalists at Byline Times reported that Drokova had worked for Epstein as a public relations agent, based on mentions found in the document archive. For example, in 2017 she contacted a Science journalist, Jeffrey Mervis, presenting herself as Epstein’s publicist. She told journalist Seth Hettena that this was a one-time service for which she was not paid. The reporting also stated that she selected "suitable" journalists for publications about Epstein and coordinated preparation of his comments, including for an article in The Huffington Post. The same document releases were later reported to show that Epstein reimbursed certain expenses and sent her a Prada handbag; one report said he gifted her a $1,750 Prada handbag and paid for a $7,000 stay at the Four Seasons in New York.

In 2016, she became a co-founder of the webinar series WE Talks from the Women Entrepreneurs Finance Initiative, launched by Epstein’s assistant Lana Pozhidaeva. The reporting stated that contact details and registration addresses overlapped with addresses associated with Epstein’s foundations. In 2019, Viktoriya Drokova, Maria Drokova’s sister, became the founder of the Russian branch of WE Talks.

== Awards ==
- Medal of the Order "For Merit to the Fatherland" (1st class), “for information support and active public activity in developing civil society in the Russian Federation” (23 April 2008).
- Included in the Forbes 30 Under 30 list for 2019.
