= Valentina Melnikova =

Russian human rights activist (born 1946)

- Валентина Дмитриевна Мельникова
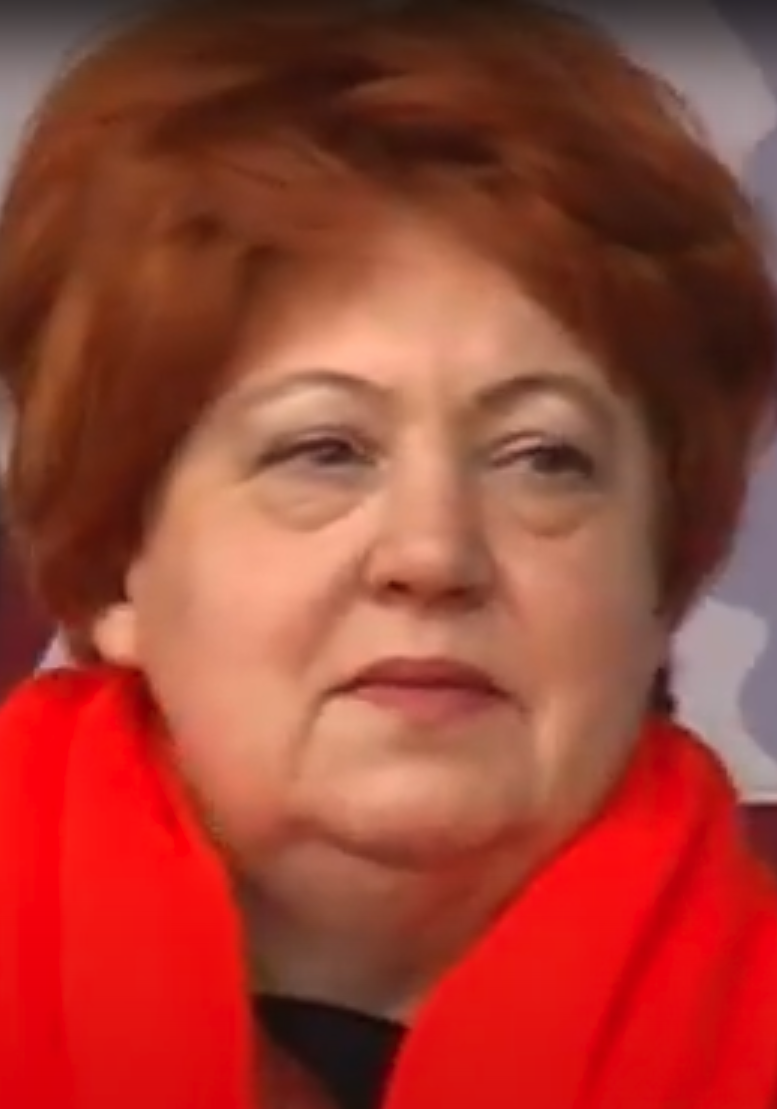
- Melnikova in 2011
- Born: Valentina Dmitrievna Melnikova; 28 February 1946 (age 80); Moscow, RSFSR, Soviet Union
- Citizenship: Russia
- Education: Lomonosov Moscow State University (Faculty of Geology, 1968)
- Occupations: Human rights activist; politician; crystallographer; geology lecturer
- Years active: 1989–present
- Known for: Union of the Committees of Soldiers' Mothers of Russia
- Awards: Seán MacBride Peace Prize (1995, to the Committee of Soldiers' Mothers of Russia); Right Livelihood Award (1996)

Valentina Dmitrievna Melnikova (born 28 February 1946, in Moscow) is a Russian human rights activist and politician. She is a long-time spokesperson and responsible secretary of the Union of the Committees of Soldiers' Mothers of Russia. Trained as a crystallographer at the Faculty of Geology of Moscow State University, she taught geology there before becoming a public figure through the soldiers' mothers movement.

== Early life and scientific work ==
=== Education and geology ===
Valentina Melnikova was born in Moscow on 28 February 1946. Her father was from Ukraine, and while Soviet internal passports still carried a nationality line, hers listed her as Ukrainian. At fourteen, finishing the seventh grade, she left that school with other high-achieving girls for a technical secondary school (tekhnikum), a step she later called her first conscious decision.

She completed the evening division of the Faculty of Geology at Moscow State University, specializing as a crystallographer. She graduated in 1968. She worked as an engineer at the V. I. Vernadsky Institute of Geochemistry and Analytical Chemistry, at the All-Union Institute of Mineral Resources (VIMS)—now the All-Russian Scientific Research Institute of Mineral Resources named for N. M. Fedorovsky—and at the Department of Geochemistry at Moscow State University. Her post at VIMS is dated from 1972 to 1990. She has been described as a geologist who worked at a mineral-resources research institute, and as a crystallographer and geology teacher at the university.

=== Years in the German Democratic Republic ===
From 1975 to 1980 she lived in the German Democratic Republic, where her husband worked. Her husband was an engineer sent for five years to a uranium mining and processing combine, and she returned in 1980. She linked the break in her own career to the birth of her children and to that posting. After the return, she said, there was no work; she spent several years unemployed, and a job she later took "was no longer the same," in a period when "nobody needed anything anymore."

In December 1979, still in East Germany, she heard a radio report that Soviet troops had entered Afghanistan, and she decided that she would not send her sons—then still small—into the army. She said the family had visited Soviet garrisons and knew officers' households, so she already had a picture of how soldiers were treated.

=== The Chronos enterprise ===
In 1990, she said, friends from the university set up a small enterprise and she joined them. The firm «Хронос» (Chronos) listed her, from 1990 to 1995, as a co-founder and deputy director of a business making X-ray instruments for non-destructive testing. She described portable sets, assembled with an inventor colleague, for finding internal defects in metal. Customers, in her account, included automobile plants, large repair shops and aircraft factories, and the colleague used the equipment to inspect fastening bolts at the Bolshoi Theatre.

She kept the instrument job while taking part in soldiers' mothers' work. In the summer of 1995, once she concluded that the First Chechen War would last, she left paid employment. The committee's small room was seeing on the order of 200 new people a day—families of the missing, freed prisoners, and conscripts who did not want to be sent—and after that year she did not return to the firm. She described the same break as becoming an unemployed woman whose occupation was the rights of servicemen.

== The soldiers' mothers movement ==
=== Founding in 1989 and the end of student deferments ===
The movement began with student deferments narrowed in the early 1980s. Mothers lobbied the Supreme Soviet of the Soviet Union, the deferments were restored in spring 1989, and the Committee of Soldiers' Mothers was formally established that April. The Moscow committee was dated to April 1989, with 70 to 300 active members. A Moscow committee was also dated to April 1988, and parallel bodies were listed, including the Right of the Mother fund and a Chelyabinsk association.

The 1990 report named the chair as Maria Ivanovna Kabrisova—later identified as Maria Kirbasova—and credited hotel pickets and appeals to deputies with helping to stop student call-ups and demobilize those already in service, and it kept contacts in the Baltic republics, Leningrad, and elsewhere. By October 1991, three organizations were competing: Kirbasova's committee; Soldiers' Mothers of Russia, linked to Vitaly Urazhtsev and Lyubov Lymar; and a parents' committee led by Boris Zolotukhin.

Melnikova was not the chair in that reporting. Looking for people concerned about their sons led her to the committee in 1989; she spoke of "energetic women from all over the Soviet Union" who "achieved a lot" through deputies of the Interregional Group. A February 2000 profile nevertheless called her the founder, and said she "stumbled upon her mission in 1989," near the end of the Soviet–Afghan War.

A party and government resolution of 31 March 1989 granted deferments, from 1 January 1989, to full-time higher-education students and some secondary students training as reserve officers, but not to men already called up. On 11 July the Supreme Soviet, over Mikhail Gorbachev's signature, ordered the August–September discharge of full-time students drafted in 1986–88, including those in the border, internal, and railway troops. One reference history puts the number sent home at about 180,000; the resolution gives none.

=== Hazing, non-combat deaths and public campaigns ===
The committees then turned to violence inside units. Dedovshchina, the hierarchy in which second-year conscripts dominated recruits, had been largely taboo until glasnost. In the spring and summer of 1990, protests over barracks deaths became a mass phenomenon.

The campaign turned on a claim of about 15,000 non-combat deaths in four years, set against official losses in nearly a decade in Afghanistan. The figure appears to have come from the deputy Vladimir Lopatin and was then publicized by the committee. In August 1990 a General Staff spokesman said it did not "correspond to reality," offered no other number, and put deaths from dedovshchina at just over 1 percent rather than 75 to 80. An open letter in Komsomolskaya Pravda cited ministry statistics for the same total, with 20 percent called suicides. The ministry refused comment. Mothers had exhumed sons listed as suicides and found signs of beatings.

In May 1990 Kabrisova said that men were dying above all in the construction battalions. About 20 mothers told the Main Military Procuracy on 17 May that they would not send sons there. The committee asked that the duty be replaced, until an alternative-service law, by civilian work—backed, it said, by Moscow soviet deputy chairman Sergei Stankevich—called the battalions a "Gulag for youth," and announced an all-union conference for 1 June.

On 15 November 1990 Gorbachev ordered a commission under Yuri Kalmykov, including the committee, to review investigations of peacetime deaths by 1 January 1991. The decree asked the Supreme Soviet to take up the committee's proposals, told the government to look at compensation and leave, and set 1992 for disbanding most construction detachments on civilian sites, with conscription into them to stop from autumn 1991.

Melnikova later placed herself in that work, not at the head of the 1989 committee. In 2014 she recalled that "back in 1989, together with the mums, we demanded an investigation into the deaths of Soviet soldiers in peacetime." In a 1998 interview she called dedovshchina "a crime against the individual" and the official label "non-statutory relations" "a mask, a lie."

=== The Russian Research Centre for Human Rights ===
In 1990 she also entered a wider coalition. What became the Russian Research Centre for Human Rights began that year as an association and was registered in 1992 as the Moscow Research Centre for Human Rights. The Independent Psychiatric Association of Russia, a member, says it united about 15 groups, among them the Moscow Helsinki Group, soldiers' mothers' committees, a criminal-justice centre, and a group assisting disabled people, and names the former political prisoner Aleksei Smirnov as an initiator and director from 1990 to 1998.

A 2021 interview introduction calls Melnikova one of the 1990 centre's initiators, not its director. Reporting its 2015 "foreign agent" listing, Interfax identified her as chair of the board. Lyubov Vinogradova directed it from 1998 to 2005, when re-registration made it all-Russian and fixed its later name.

== The wars in Chechnya ==
=== The first war and mothers at the front ===
When the First Chechen War began in late 1994, the Committee of Soldiers' Mothers of Russia—later the Union of the Committees of Soldiers' Mothers of Russia—opposed it at once. In its 1996 Right Livelihood Award speech, the committee said it sent an anti-war statement on 27 November 1994, after the first battle in Grozny and before federal troops entered in force, and that its strategy was withdrawal and talks without preconditions. It said hundreds of mothers went to Chechnya to take sons from units or captivity, and that it worked with Chechen women on exchanges.

Other journeys were improvised. In February 1995 mothers were found at a camp gate trying to take conscripts off transports, while the Moscow office issued clemency appeals; Ida Kuklina estimated that as many as 5,000 men had avoided Chechnya. From Ingushetia, parents were described searching battlefields, morgues, and basement prisons. The organized trips are tied especially to Maria Kirbasova, then head of the committee: she and others met field commanders and brought out several dozen prisoners. Zainap Gashaeva told of a "march of mothers' compassion" under Kirbasova, of about a hundred mothers, meant to stand between the sides and take sons home. The committee placed that march in the spring of 1995, said Russian and Chechen women backed it, and said its representatives met Prime Minister Viktor Chernomyrdin in February to demand an immediate stop. Melnikova led the Moscow organization, not that march; she later called the 1995–96 trips talks by "representatives of the people" over individual soldiers.

=== Casualty figures and public advocacy ===
The toll was disputed. Human Rights Watch cited an October 1996 statement by General Alexander Lebed—3,826 Russian troops killed, 17,892 wounded, 1,100 missing—against a Memorial Human Rights Center list of 4,379 dead, and estimated at least 50,000 civilian deaths. The committee said official figures were, in its view, "not full and not true," and that a ceasefire like the Khasavyurt Accord, signed by Lebed and Aslan Maskhadov, could have come sooner had there been political will.

In the Second Chechen War, Melnikova said in February 2000 that the committee counted 8,000 Russian dead in 1994–96 and 3,000 already in a shorter second war. General Valery Manilov answered that "the most aggressive committees are those whose women have lost no sons and have no sons fighting in Chechnya." The mothers posted names the military would not release. On 24 January an estimate of about 3,000 dead, about four times an official 741, was reported; the government called it lies; Melnikova said Moscow had averaged regional reports, about forty dead in each of some eighty regions, as in 1995. By 24 February she put deaths above 3,500 and injuries above 6,000.

== Party politics ==
=== The United People's Party of Soldiers' Mothers ===
In February 2004 the Union of the Committees of Soldiers' Mothers of Russia notified the Ministry of Justice that it intended to form a party. Valentina Melnikova, the union's executive secretary and chair of the organizing committee, said help for individual conscripts was not a political voice; Ida Kuklina, of the same committee, said the party would also speak for women and children.

The founding congress of the United People's Party of Soldiers' Mothers (Единая народная партия солдатских матерей) met in Moscow on 6–7 November 2004, and on 7 November elected Melnikova leader. She said its first bill in the State Duma would replace conscription with a contract army, and that ending the war in Chechnya was the other aim. Delegates discussed an appeal to Aslan Maskhadov: Akhmed Zakayev had said separatist leaders would meet the mothers, while Ramzan Kadyrov, then a Chechen vice-premier, called the contacts blasphemous.

The party was never registered alone. From 2004 parties had to show 50,000 members. On 17 October 2005 Melnikova and Duma deputy Vladimir Ryzhkov announced it would become a faction of the Republican Party of Russia, with two or three of its leaders on that party's council. They cited about 30,000 Republican members and about 20,000 soldiers' mothers. Boris Nadezhdin of the Union of Right Forces welcomed the merger but doubted the ministry would accept it.

=== Co-chair of the Republican Party of Russia ===
At the Republican Party's 14th congress in Moscow on 17–18 December 2005, Ryzhkov said it had 64,000 members and that the merger was done: about 5,000 soldiers' mothers had joined, 15 were present, and Melnikova had entered the political council to move a resolution for a professional army. Yuri Chernichenko of the unregistered Peasants' Party was there as that group began to join. The congress elected Valery Zubov chairman of the political council and Sheshenin chairman of the executive committee. The ministry refused to record the new officers; in Republican Party of Russia v. Russia the European Court of Human Rights later held that refusal, and the dissolution that followed, to be violations of freedom of association. Garry Kasparov and Nikita Belykh of the Union of Right Forces attended; Ryzhkov rejected a joint list with Yabloko.

By the closure Melnikova counted four chairs: herself, founder Vladimir Lysenko, Ryzhkov, and Zubov, who had moved to A Just Russia. On 23 March 2007 the Supreme Court of Russia dissolved the party as short of 50,000 members and of 45 branches of 500; the party said it had 58,166. Ryzhkov, Lysenko and Melnikova appealed on 3 April; the appellate collegium upheld the judgment on 31 May 2007. The Strasbourg judgment of 12 April 2011, final on 15 September 2011, called the dissolution disproportionate.

In March 2012 the ministry said it would restore registration after consultations ordered by President Dmitry Medvedev. By 10 May this had been done by a special procedure implementing the Strasbourg judgment. Melnikova, interviewed as co-chair, said Lysenko had withdrawn through illness. While the Republican Party was unregistered she sat on the federal political council of the People's Freedom Party, where Ryzhkov was a co-chair.

=== PARNAS and the end of the party ===
On 16 June 2012 a congress merged the restored Republican Party with the unregistered People's Freedom Party as the Republican Party of Russia — People's Freedom Party (RPR–PARNAS). Ryzhkov, Boris Nemtsov and Mikhail Kasyanov were elected co-chairs, 150 votes to two. A 45-member federal political council included Melnikova, a former Republican co-chair, Ilya Yashin, Sergei Aleksashenko and Vladimir Kara-Murza; Yashin and Melnikova also joined its bureau. Nemtsov urged a mass protest; Kasyanov called the party an opponent of the system of power.

On 8 February 2014 Ryzhkov left with about 15 supporters, including Melnikova, after the council replaced him as executive secretary with Konstantin Merzlikin. She said refusal to deal with the authorities blocked work on military reform, and called Nemtsov and Kasyanov officials used to appointing and dismissing people; Nemtsov said the exit would damage the opposition. The quarrel followed the party's support for Alexei Navalny as Moscow mayor in 2013 and Ryzhkov's meeting with President Vladimir Putin.

Melnikova did not return. The ministry suspended the registration in June 2021. On 25 May 2023 the Supreme Court liquidated PARNAS for too few regional branches; the party said the ministry had itself cancelled seven, called the claim politicized, and said it would continue under its own programme. The appeal panel left the judgment in force on 25 July 2023. Kasyanov was chairman; reports noted that he had left Russia.

== 2022 invasion of Ukraine ==
After the full-scale Russian invasion of Ukraine in February 2022, Melnikova's office again became a channel for soldiers and relatives trying to extract information from the Ministry of Defence. In a May 2022 interview, she called the scale of the missing unprecedented in her practice, comparing it with the New Year 1994–95 assault on Grozny, when about 2,500 bodies lay uncollected, and said families of the missing still had no recognized legal status.

During the partial mobilization that autumn, she said the committee was receiving several hundred requests a day and that call-up was breaking the law on mobilization and the law on military duty "in every way," including skipped medical checks and notices without legal force.

Before Vladimir Putin met a selected group of soldiers' mothers and wives in November 2022, Melnikova said her committee had not been invited and would not have wanted to attend alongside relatives "agreed to their husbands and sons dying on the front." She said the committee had never before had thousands of appeals in a week, described mobilization at times as "total lawlessness," and declined to go further because of the risk attached to discussing what the Russian authorities call a "special military operation."
