= Oleg Kashin =

Russian journalist and columnist (born 1980)

- Олег Кашин
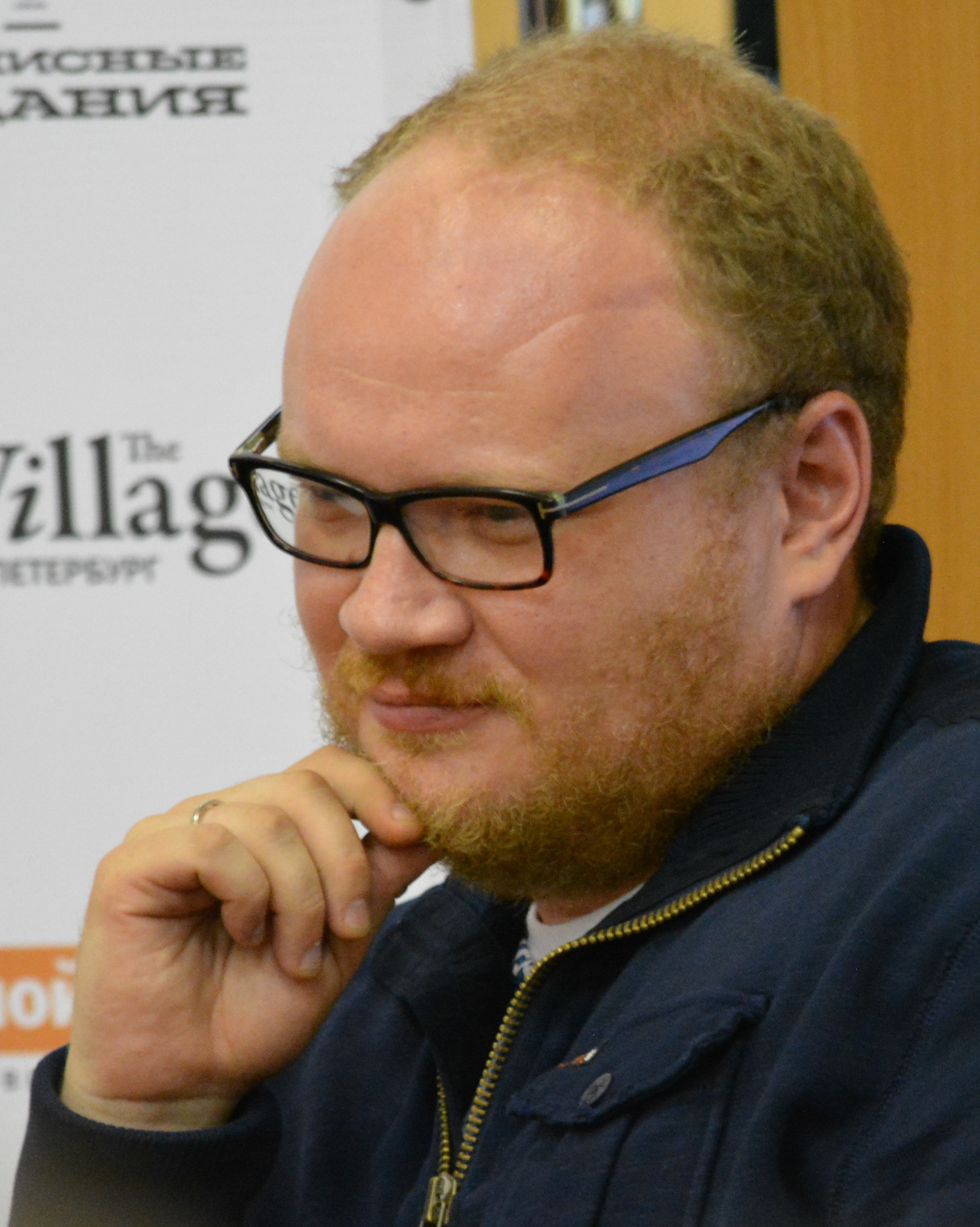
- Kashin in 2014
- Born: Oleg Vladimirovich Kashin; 17 June 1980 (age 46); Kaliningrad, Russian SFSR, Soviet Union
- Citizenship: Russia
- Education: Baltic Fishing Fleet State Academy
- Occupations: Journalist, writer, columnist, opinion journalist, political commentator, blogger, television and radio presenter
- Years active: 2001 — present
- Spouse(s): Yevgenia Milova (m. 2006; div. 2011) Tatyana Suvorova (after 2011)
- Children: 1
- Awards: Prize for the Freedom and Future of the Media (2011); Paul Klebnikov Civil Society Fellowship (2012)

Oleg Vladimirovich Kashin (Russian: Олег Владимирович Кашин; born 17 June 1980) is a London-based Russian journalist, columnist and writer known for his political articles.

Since the early 2000s, he worked for Russia’s leading media, including Komsomolskaya Pravda and Kommersant, while also contributing to various online outlets and television channels.

In 2010, Kashin was attacked near his home in Moscow, a crime that sparked widespread public outcry across Russia. Investigators determined that the assault was a contract hit linked to his work as a journalist. in 2015, Kashin publicly accused politician Andrey Turchak of orchestrating the attack. In 2018, the perpetrators were convicted in a separate criminal case, but the mastermind was never identified by the investigation.

Facing mounting security threats, Kashin left Russia in 2016 and emigrated to Geneva, Switzerland, and then to London, United Kingdom. From abroad, he runs his own YouTube and Telegram channels and collaborates on joint projects with Mikhail Svetov and Ilya Varlamov.

Oleg Kashin identifies himself as a Russian nationalist. In the early 2010s, he took part in the protest movement and served on the Russian Opposition Coordination Council. After Russia launched its full-scale invasion of Ukraine in 2022, he spoke out against the war, as a result of which he was labelled a foreign agent by the Russian government and, in 2024, placed on a criminal wanted list.

At the same time, because of his criticism of Alexei Navalny and his supporters, in 2022 Kashin was added by the Anti-Corruption Foundation to its "list of bribe-takers and warmongers". He was later also placed under Ukrainian sanctions.

== Biography ==
=== Early life ===
Oleg Vladimirovich Kashin was born on 17 June 1980 in Kaliningrad.

In March 2003, he graduated from the Baltic Fishing Fleet State Academy in Kaliningrad with a degree in maritime navigation. Kashin sailed twice to sea on a sailing ship Kruzenshtern, being a deck hand and a navigator intern. He also participated in international sailing regatta.

=== Early career ===
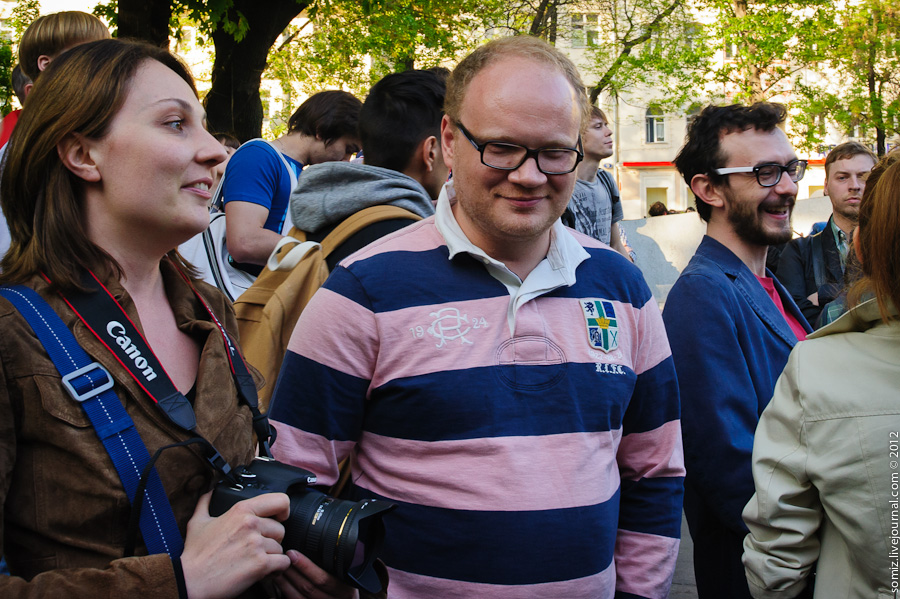
Oleg Kashin in 2012

While studying at the Baltic Fishing Fleet State Academy, Kashin wrote for Komsomolskaya Pravda in Kaliningrad where he expressed rather sharp views. He continued to work for that newspaper up to 2003, specializing on exclusive interviews and special reports, then moved to Moscow and started working as a journalist for Komsomolskaya Pravda in Moscow. After a while, he left the newspaper, became a staff writer at Kommersant and became the leading Russian journalist covering youth political movements, ranging broadly from the National Bolshevik Party to Nashi. On 1 June 2004, while working on an assignment for Kommersant to cover a protest by the Vanguard of Red Youth near the White House in Moscow, Oleg Kashin was assaulted by officers of the Federal Guard Service. According to Kommersant, the FGS officers kicked him in the face and kidneys while demanding he hand over the camera’s memory card on which the photo correspondent for Kommersant, Yuri Martyanov, had recorded the protest. As a result of the attack, Kashin suffered a concussion and multiple bruises. Later, the courts found no fault in the actions of the FGS officers.

In February 2005, Oleg Kashin attended the first congress of the youth movement Nashi as a correspondent for Kommersant. According to Kashin, the Nashi activists forcibly brought him onto the stage and declared him "an enemy of Russia and, specifically, of Nashi", after which they illegally detained him in a locked room at the guesthouse until the movement's leader, Vasily Yakemenko, arrived.

Kashin left Kommersant in June 2005, dissatisfied with the dismissal of the director-general Andrei Vassiliev. From September to October 2005, he worked as a special correspondent for the Izvestia newspaper, and from 2005 to 2007, he worked as a columnist for the Expert magazine. He also worked for the Russian Journal publication. He co-hosted (together with Maria Gaidar) the show called "Black and White" on the O2TV channel.

In 2007, Kashin became a regular author and a deputy editor of the Ŗusskaya zhizn (The Russian Life) magazine. In 2009, Kashin returned to Kommersant as a special correspondent.

=== Later career, post-2010 ===
In October 2010, the press service of the Russian President refused to allow Oleg Kashin, accredited by Kommersant, to attend a meeting between President Dmitry Medvedev and rock musicians. The justification given was that the journalist was on the Federal Guard Service’s blacklist due to his detention at the Dissenters' March in the spring of 2007.

Kommersant published an interview that Kashin conducted with an unnamed participant in the attack by anarchists and antifa activists on the Khimki city administration building on 28 July 2010. Subsequently, the Main Directorate of Internal Affairs for Moscow Oblast attempted to compel the editorial board to disclose the source, but it refused. A representative of the Young Guard of United Russia, in connection with the publication of the interview, referred to Oleg Kashin and his colleagues at Kommersant as "enemies of the entire Russian people" and "traitors", stating that Kashin was "conducting semi-underground journalistic-subversive activities aimed at corrupting readers", that "the situation cannot remain without the most serious consequences", and that the "enemies" would "be punished".

In 2011, Kashin was present at the meeting with U.S. Vice President Joe Biden, as part of a group of Russian public figures.

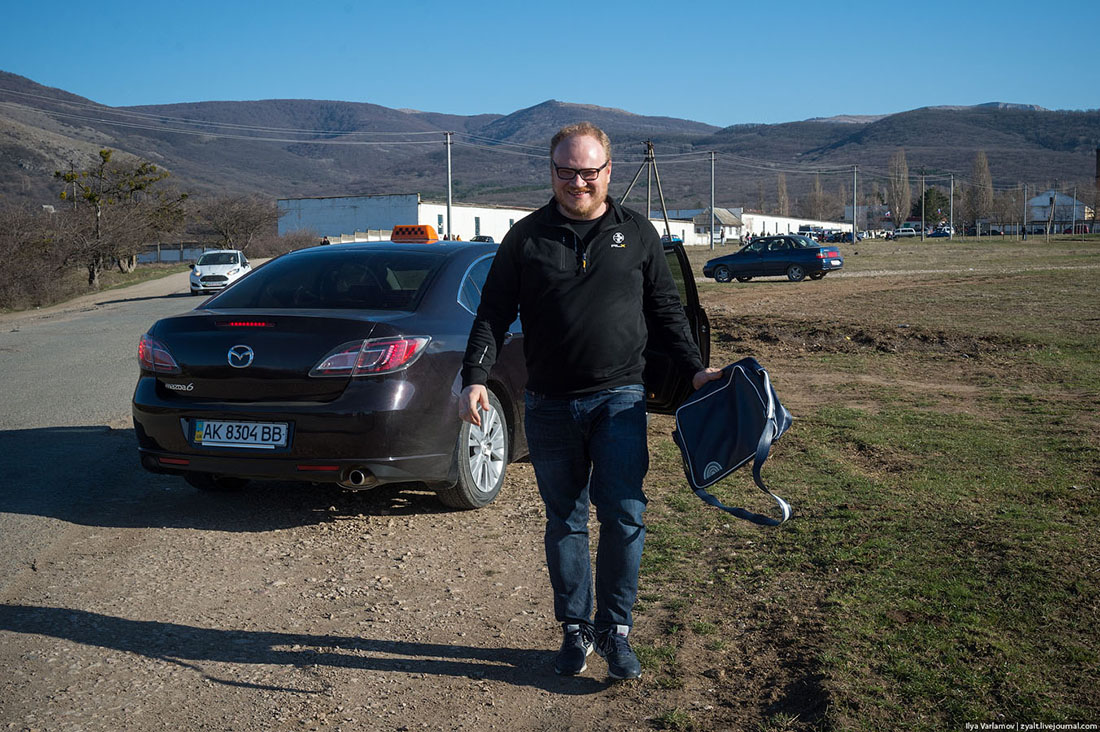
Kashin visiting Crimea during the Russian annexation, March 2014

In November 2012, he was fired due to a lack of performance, as reported by the newspaper's management.

In 2012, Kashin underwent an internship at the Harriman Institute as a Paul Klebnikov Fund Fellow.

After relocating to Geneva in 2013, Kashin continued writing for Republic.ru, Colta.ru, and Sputnik and Pogrom. In 2014, he created his own website Kashin.guru for "new Russian intelligentsia". From September 2015 to January 2020, he hosted his own show of the same name at the TV Rain.

After moving to London in April 2016, Kashin has successively worked for Echo of Moscow (as a guest host), Republic.ru (as an exclusive columnist), Komsomolskaya Pravda Radio (as a co-host to Maria Baronova). In 2019, he launched his own YouTube channel. Since 2020, Kashin has been a permanent commentator for Ilya Varlamov's weekly news show. Since 2021, he has been a co-host of Mikhail Svetov's weekly live broadcast.

=== 2010 attack ===
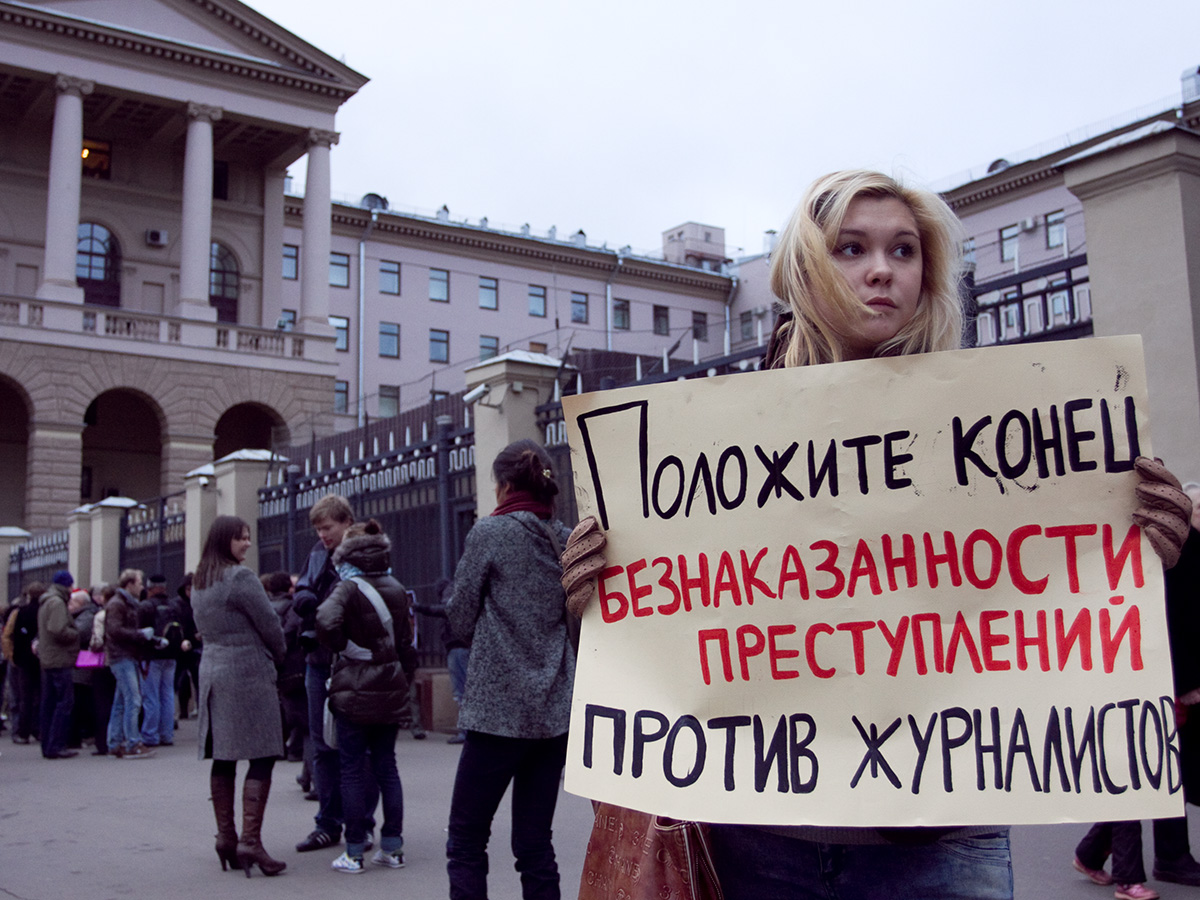
Pickets near Police Headquarters, 38 Petrovka St., Moscow to demand an investigation into the attack on Oleg Kashin

On 6 November 2010, Kashin was assaulted by unknown attackers near his home in Moscow. He was hospitalized with broken jaw, fractured skull, broken leg and broken fingers, one of which later had to be amputated. Police are treating the attack as attempted murder. President Dmitry Medvedev said that the assailants "must be found and punished" and instructed Prosecutor-General Yury Chaika and Interior Minister Rashid Nurgaliyev to take special control over the investigation of the attack. Prior to the attack, Kashin had been reporting on the proposal to build a highway through the Khimki Forest near Moscow. His reporting covering youth political movements and political protests had also prompted aggressive responses from many pro-Kremlin groups, including the Young Guard of United Russia, a youth group associated with the United Russia political party, chaired by Vladimir Putin. This attack is one of the subjects of the 2012 documentary Putin's Kiss.

Activists and journalists held pickets outside the building of the Main Directorate of Internal Affairs for the City of Moscow, demanding that the perpetrators be found and punished. The Russian Union of Journalists issued a statement in support of Kashin. On 9 November 2010, a joint session of three commissions of the Civic Chamber of Russia was held. The same month, an initiative group of students from the MSU Faculty of Journalism hung a banner on the university building on Mokhovaya Street with the words: "Who beat Kashin?". The banner was later removed by the university’s security service, which justified the action by stating that the building is an architectural landmark.

In connection with the attack on Kashin, a group of human rights activists, politicians, and journalists appealed to President Medvedev in November 2010, requesting the removal from office of the prosecutor of the Khimki District, the heads of the district internal affairs and Federal Security Service departments, as well as assistance in suspending Khimki Mayor Vladimir Strelchenko from his office.

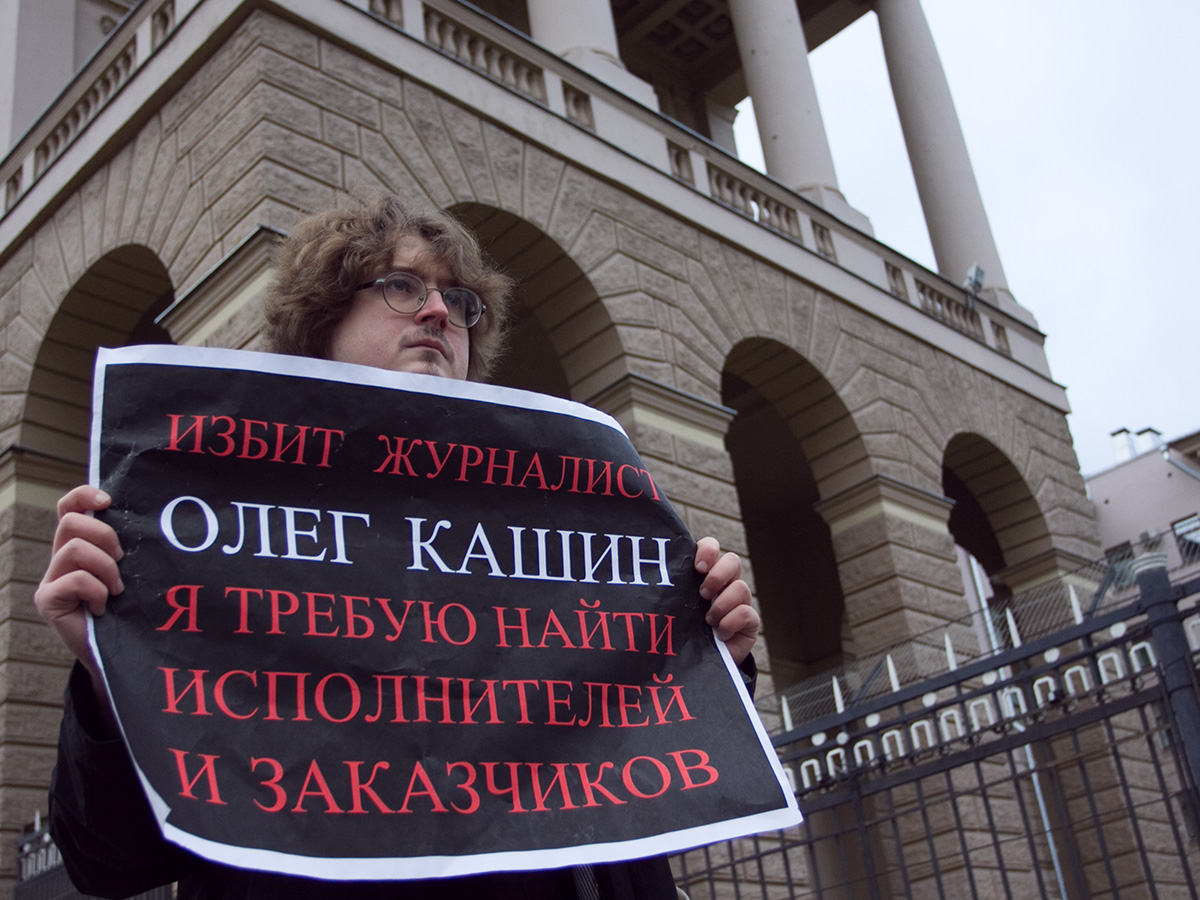
Pickets near Police Headquarters, 38 Petrovka St., Moscow to demand an investigation into the attack on Oleg Kashin

In 2015, Kashin got acquainted with the materials of the investigation, including the testimony of the suspects, and accused Andrey Turchak of ordering the crime. This was done as a revenge for a blog post, which Turchak, then a Pskov Governor, commented on with the words "You have 24 hours to apologize. The countdown has begun." No charges were officially filed against Turchak. In 2017, he was appointed deputy speaker of the Federation Council, and Putin awarded him with the Order "For Merit to the Fatherland", 2nd degree. On 27 November 2018, a full video of the interrogation of the alleged perpetrator was published, in which he said that the attack was organized by the co-owner of the "Mechanical Plant" company Alexander Gorbunov, and the customer was Turchak, who personally hurried the performers and personally demanded to break Kashin’s legs and arms so that he could not write.

In connection with the attack, The Times published an article by its Moscow-based correspondent on the current state of affairs for journalists in Russia. The US State Department, the OSCE, Amnesty International, and Freedom House have all issued statements calling on the Russian government to ensure the safety of journalists and their freedom to operate.

== Views and activities ==
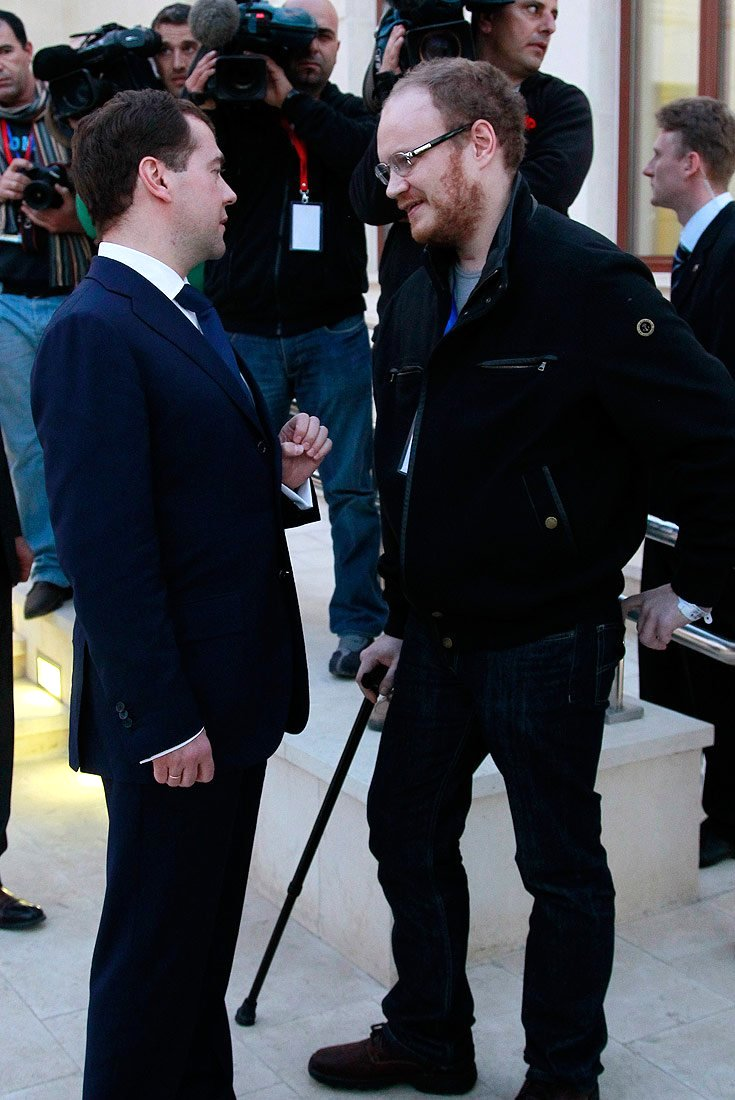
Oleg Kashin talking to Russian president Dmitry Medvedev in Jericho, 2011

In March 2011, Kashin joined the supervisory board that oversaw the fundraising for the Putin. Corruption report by Boris Nemtsov, Vladimir Milov, and Vladimir Ryzhkov. In October 2012, he was elected member of the Russian Opposition Coordination Council. In March 2013, Kashin participated in single pickets in support of Pussy Riot members Nadya Tolokonnikova and Maria Alyokhina.

Considering the widely publicized case of Andrey Sychev, in which a young conscript lost his legs and genitalia after brutal beating by other servicemen, Kashin claimed that the case was fabricated by Committee of Soldiers Mothers: "The only proven episode... is that Sychev squatted for a while in front of now imprisoned junior sergeant Sivyakov.... All the other stuff was thought up by the chairman of Chelyabinsk Committee of Soldiers Mothers Lyudmila Zinchenko, who, after giving a dozen of interviews to liberal media now cowardly conceals from investigators". In February 2006, Valery Panyushkin criticized the article, believing that Kashin was disputing the violence against a serviceman and whitewashing Defense Minister Sergei Ivanov.

In 2014, without denying that the annexation of Crimea by the Russian Federation was illegal, Kashin called it a restoration of historical justice. He has been covering the 2014 events in Crimea and the War in Donbas for the influential Russian nationalist outlet Sputnik and Pogrom.

In 2020, Kashin alleged that Yulia Navalnaya's father was Boris Abrosimov, then serving as secretary of the Russian embassy in the UK, associated with the special services, and that her aunt was Elena Abrosimova, one of the authors of the Russian Constitution. In response, Alexei Navalny published a death certificate for his father-in-law, dated 1996. Subsequently, Kashin expressed regret for disseminating inaccurate information.

He opposed the Russian invasion of Ukraine in 2022. Despite taking a strong anti-war stance and describing the actions of the Russian authorities as cannibalistic toward Ukraine and suicidal for Russia itself, he was included by Alexei Navalny's associates from the Anti-Corruption Foundation on a list of about 6,000 Russian "bribetakers and warmongers" who deserve to fall under international sanctions because of the Russian invasion of Ukraine. Kashin himself linked his inclusion on the list to the fact that he "has repeatedly criticized people who are now speaking on behalf of Navalny." After the European Parliament called on the Council of the European Union to impose personal sanctions against individuals on the ACF list on 19 May 2022, Kashin began threatening lawsuits and demanding apologies from the ACF.

On June 3, 2022, Russian Ministry of Justice included Kashin in its "foreign agents" list. He was sanctioned by Ukrainian President Volodymyr Zelenskyy in October of the same year.

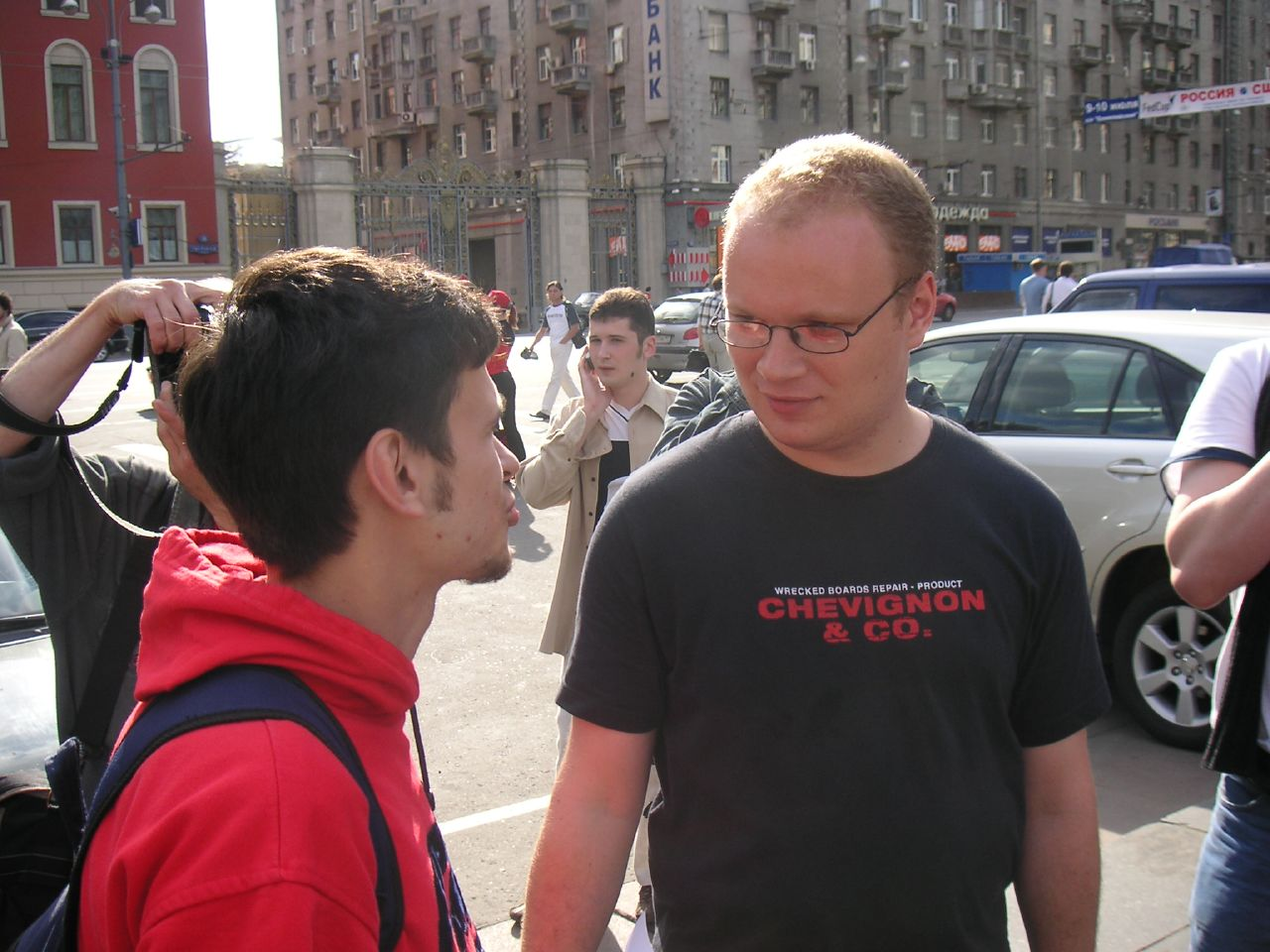
Kashin with Russian opposition politician Ilya Yashin, 2005

In May 2024, Mikhail Khodorkovsky, a former Russian oligarch and opposition leader, in the context of a conflict with associates of Alexei Navalny over the release of the documentary "The Traitors" on the events of the 1990s, posted on social media that he was willing to provide "financial support for a judicial dispute to anyone who was unjustly accused." Kashin responded with an open letter, criticizing Navalny's allies and requesting Khodorkovsky's assistance in organizing a defamation trial. The letter stated that Mr Kashin had been included on the list of individuals targeted by the International Anti-Corruption Foundation due to a dispute with the organization's leadership, with the official reason being a pre-conflict post urging others not to forget "who our people are" (the publication was actually published after large-scale events had begun).

On July 19, 2024, Kashin was placed on the Russian criminal wanted list.

== List of works ==
Fiction:

- 2010 — Fardwor, Russia: A Fantastical Tale of Life Under Putin (‘Роисся вперде. Фантастическая повесть’)
- 2014 — Gorby Dream (‘Горби-дрим’)
- 2015 — Rubik's Cube (‘Кубик Рубика’)
- 2015 — The Maritime Partisans (‘Приморские партизаны’)
- 2026 — The Bull (‘Бык’)
- 2026 — The Duckweed of Doldrums (‘Ряска безвременья’)

Non-fiction:

- 2005 — Life Always Finds a Way (‘Всюду жизнь’)
- 2008 — The Once-Acting Persons (‘Действовавшие лица’)
- 2009 — Zemfira (‘Земфира’)
- 2013 — The Power. Monopoly on Violence (‘Власть. Монополия на насилие’)
- 2013 — The Collapse. The Once-Acting Persons Testify (‘Развал. Действовавшие лица свидетельствуют’)
- 2013 — Putin's Reaction. What is Good and what is Bad (‘Реакция Путина. Что такое хорошо и что такое плохо’)
- 2024 — No Good. From the Start of the War to Navalny's Funeral (‘Ничего хорошего. От начала войны до похорон Навального’)
- 2024 — Big Style. Obituaries and Panegyrics (‘Большой стиль. Некрологи и панегирики’)
- 2025 — Social Distancing. National Cuckoldism as a Bloodsuffrage (‘Социальное дистанцирование. Национал-куколдизм как кровоизъявление’)
- 2026 — Mop up the Survivors. The Origin of Russian Trumpism (‘Добейте выживших. Истоки и смысл русского трампизма’)

== On TV ==
In 2001, Kashin appeared on the second episode of Slaboye Zveno, the Russian version of The Weakest Link quiz show. He was voted off and gave an angry speech about his opponents.

== In fiction ==
A heavily fictionalised version of Kashin played by Yevgeny Stychkin appears as one of the protagonists in the Russian journalistic procedural mini-series Just Imagine Things We Know.

In the Russian corporate-thriller television series Big Pharma, one episode depicts a journalist named Oleg being beaten outside the entrance to his apartment building with a length of rebar hidden in a bouquet of flowers because of his professional activities; the victim subsequently loses a phalanx of a finger. This echoes the 2010 attack on Kashin outside his apartment building in Moscow, in which two assailants hid rebar in flowers and, as a result of the attack, Kashin had to have a finger amputated. The series screenwriter, however, stated that no conscious parallels were intended in either the scene or the character.
