= Putin's Kiss =

- Directed by: Lise Birk Pedersen
- Produced by: Helle Faber
- Starring: Oleg Kashin; Masha Drokova
- Cinematography: Lars Skree
- Edited by: Janus Billeskov Jansen, Steen Johannesen
- Release date: January 19, 2012
- Language: Russian

Putin's Kiss (Russian: Поцелуй Путина, romanized: Potseluy Putina) is a 2012 documentary, directed by Lise Birk Pedersen, about Russian youth activist Masha Drokova (Maria Alexandrovna Drokova, married name: Masha Bucher) and her experiences with the youth organisation Nashi.

== Plot ==
Putin's Kiss presents, through interviews and archival footage, Masha Drokova's experiences in the Russian youth organisation Nashi, which declares itself to be a democratic, anti-fascist, anti-'oligarchic-capitalist' movement. From the age of 16 through to 19 she is heavily involved in the organisation, working her way up into a position of influence and authority, eventually becoming the host of a youth oriented, state funded television program. She idolises Russian President Vladimir Putin, and the film's title refers to an incident in which, while receiving a medal from him, Drokova spontaneously hugged and kissed him.

As the film goes on, Drokova becomes friends with several other journalists, many of whom are critical of the Russian ruling party. Her views are called into question and she becomes increasingly torn between the two. The situation reaches a head when her friend and fellow journalist Oleg Kashin is violently beaten; though his attackers are never identified, it is speculated by many that they were working for the Kremlin in some capacity. By the end of the film, she is no longer a member of Nashi, and she is shown discussing her views freely with Kashin.

== Reception ==
Putin's Kiss won the World Cinema Cinematography Award in Documentary at the 2012 Sundance Film Festival. It was pitched at Sheffield Doc/Fest's MeetMarket in 2009. It has received mixed reviews, and holds a rating of 52 out of 100 on review aggregator Metacritic. openDemocracy refers to it as "a complex tale of inner conflict" and the New York Post said that it was "more than just the portrait of a naive young woman...it’s a frightening look at Putin’s warped version of democracy." Time Out New York afforded the film 2 out of 5 stars, saying that "Lise Birk Pedersen's doc offers some compelling peeks into Russia's bureaucratic skulduggery, but her attempt to frame the situation through a young convert's coming of age never really coheres. Innocence was lost; so, apparently, was much of the insightful commentary."

Alison Willmore, for The A.V. Club, wrote: "Moon-faced and busty, Drokova is a photogenic, articulate spokesperson, and it’s clear why the Nashi leadership seized on her and nurtured her; she’s the kind of representative who could be proudly introduced to foreign journalists. But her earnestness and genuine nature also lead to her disenchantment with the group, as she starts to socialize with Kashin and other liberals, and finds she can no longer see them as a monolithic enemy." J.R. Jones, for Chicago Reader, wrote: "Pedersen frames her film as a profile of Masha Drokova, who was only 16 when she joined Nashi in 2005 but whose smarts and enthusiasm catapulted her to the top echelon of the organization. A tireless Nashi activist who once collected a kiss from Vladimir himself on TV, Drokova was awarded a medal of honor from the president in 2007, attended a top university, and even had her own TV show, a real credential in a nation where the airwaves are strictly policed by the ruling party." Andrew Schenker, for Slant Magazine, wrote: "Putin's Kiss fails to dig too deep into the politics or inner workings of the new right-wing youth movement it profiles." Deborah Young, for The Hollywood Reporter, wrote: "the filmmaker shows Masha’s rapid rise from a pleasingly plump and buxom 16-year-old to the peak of power in Nashi, a vast youth movement maneuvered by political forces loyal to Putin and President Medvedev. At Nashi's summer camp, she boldly manages to kiss her hero on the cheek, thus becoming known as “the girl who kissed Putin.” She has her own apartment, a new car and a pro-Putin talk show. She comes to think of herself as a journalist....portrays Masha as an ambitious, intelligent, right-wing young lady who comes fatefully into contact with a bunch of left-wing journalists and loses her bearings. The overall effect is tragi-comic, even considering the dark events that bring the film to an unexpected dramatic climax."

John Powers, pop culture and critic-at-large on NPR's Fresh Air with Terry Gross, wrote: "what makes Putin's Kiss interesting ... it offers a fresh glimpse into how Putin's Russia actually works"
