= 6000 List =

List of bribe-takers and warmongers compiled by the Anti-Corruption Foundation

The list of bribe-takers and warmongers, frequently called the 6,000 List, is the Anti-Corruption Foundation initiative to create a comprehensive list of enablers of the Russo-Ukrainian war and the 2022 Russian invasion of Ukraine. The list is designed to serve as a guideline and a reference for international sanctions against Russian officials, business people, siloviki, propagandists, public warmongers, and other people accountable for creating a police state, repressions, and war. Each entry includes a dossier with proof of individual guilt corresponding with the EU requirements and criteria for individual sanctions. The list was expanded many times, greatly exceeding 6,000 profiles. As of December 2025, it included almost 8,000 people.

== History ==
The Anti-Corruption Foundation (ACF) published the list on April 26, 2022, to help the Western countries to add the key beneficiaries of the Putin regime and supporters of the 2022 Russian invasion of Ukraine to their sanctions list. The ACF built the project on the assumption that the risk of sanctions would undermine the loyalty of the Russian elites to Vladimir Putin.

ACF closely cooperated with the EU and the US politicians to promote sanctions against the Russian war enablers. In May 2022, Leonid Volkov met with the EU's chief diplomat Josep Borrell and the deputy head of the European Parliament Guy Verhofstadt. The meeting resulted in the EU Parliament's recommendation for the Council of the European Union to use the ACF's list of war enablers in the development of new sanctions, including the sanctions against the former European politicians holding key positions in the Russian state-owned companies (such as Karin Kneissl and Gerhard Schröder), also proposed by the ACF. The ACF urged its supporters to contact the EU Parliament members with the corresponding requests directly. In January 2023, Guy Verhofstadt appealed for wide sanctions against the individuals included in the 6,000 List following the start of the #FreeNavalny campaign, getting support from over 110 EU parliamentarians.

In May 2022, ACF representatives met with US Congressmen in Washington, D.C. to promote the idea of individual sanctions as a cost-effective way to speed up the erosion of Putin's regime. In June, nine congressmen of both the Republican and the Democratic addressed an official request to expand sanctions based on the 6,000 List to the United States Secretary of the Treasury Janet Yellen.

=== The 200 List ===
In August 2022, at the request of the UK Foreign, Commonwealth and Development Office, the ACF created a short list of 200 key war enablers not covered by the UK sanctions. The foundation emphasized the personal responsibility of six individuals: Anton Siluanov (Minister of Finance of Russia and a member of the Security Council), Vladimir Medinsky (Aide to the President of Russia), Elvira Nabiullina (Governor of the Central Bank of Russia), businessman Iskander Makhmudov, and propagandists Ekaterina Andreeva and Tina Kandelaki The publication of the 200 List was followed by Alexei Navalny's transfer to a solitary confinement cell.

In September 2022, the US House of Representatives passed the bipartisan bill on sanctions against 198 war enablers, based on the 200 List, with minor alterations (as some of the people on the list had already been subject to the US sanctions).

== Contents ==
The list of war enablers includes Russian officials, siloviki, propagandists, public warmongers, and other people accountable for human rights abuses and military aggression in Ukraine. For each entry, the ACF provided a dossier with proof of guilt which corresponds with the formal requirements for the EU sanctions. By February 2023, the list included 6,968 people in the following categories and sub-categories:

- War Arrangers (Security Council members, Military staff and accomplices of Russian occupation)
- Propagandists (federal media personnel, Chief editors and management of regional TV channels, Regional press people)
- Individuals involved in corruption (Investigations subjects, Regional investigations subjects, Oligarchs)
- Putin's Public Supporters (Presidential proxies in elections)
- Senior Federal Officials (Executive branch and Presidential Administration employees)
- Members of Parliament and Senate (State Duma, Federation Council)
- Region heads (Governors)
- Key Local Government Officials (Vice-Governors, speakers of the regional legislative assemblies)
- State Bankers (the Central Bank of Russia employees, board members; Heads of public funds)
- ‘United Russia’ party Functionaries (Federal and regional party leaders)
- Key ‘siloviki’ (security forces) figures (Ministry of Internal Affairs, Federal Security Service, National Guard of Russia, Investigative Committee of Russia, Prosecutor's office).
- Organizers of political repressions (Judges, prosecutors, state investigators, Internet censors)
- Election fraud organizers (heads of the Central Election Commission and local election commissions)
- Sellout opinion leaders (Celebrities, influencers, and bloggers; Public supporters of Putin)
- Warmongers (educators, artists, scholars, athletes, Ideologists of war)
- Top Management of State Owned Companies (Managers and their deputies, board members and boards of directors)

The list was expanded numerous times, hence the number of war enablers exceeds 6,000. For instance, since July 2022, the list was extended with:

- tech executives accountable for internet censorship
- Supreme Court of Russia judges responsible for undermining the separation of powers in the state
- Moscow City Court judges who made unjust decisions against Putin's political opponents
- religious leaders who supported the invasion of Ukraine
- top military officers involved in the invasion of Ukraine,
- members of the occupation authorities
- developers of the mass surveillance system used by the Russian authorities
- subjects of anti-corruption investigations by The Insider, Proekt, and iStories
- businessmen—the beneficiaries of Vladimir Putin's regime.

In October 2022, the list was expanded with the people involved in organizing and falsifying of electronic voting in Moscow at the 2021 Russian legislative election, including the former chief editor of Echo of Moscow media Alexei Venediktov.

On numerous occasions, Leonid Volkov emphasized that the person can be excluded from the list in case of active repentance, proportional to guilt.

== Reaction ==
The people who found themselves on the 6,000 List, such as Ilya Remeslo, Ksenia Sobchak, and journalist Oleg Kashin, have criticized the initiative. The ACF recognized the minor inaccuracies found in some records as inevitable mistakes in such a large body of work.

Some people added to the 6,000 List approached ACF to contest their inclusion or cooperate with ACF. For instance, Artyom Kukharenko and Alexandr Kabakov, the founders of NtechLab, the developer of facial recognition technology for mass surveillance in Russia, provided ACF with detailed information about the system, the companies, and the individuals involved in maintaining it. ACF excluded them from the list but canceled this decision following the criticism, as the repentance was considered insufficient to compensate for their contribution to creating a police state in Russia.

== See also ==
- List of people and organizations sanctioned during the Russo-Ukrainian war
- Navalny 35 (2021)

== Links ==
- List of bribetakers and warmongers on the ASF's website
- "Top 200 Bribetakers and Warmongers (UK)" (PDF). The Anti-Corruption Foundation.
- "Top 200 Bribetakers and Warmongers (EU)" (PDF). The Anti-Corruption Foundation.
- "Contributors to the War (основной список)" (PDF). The Anti-Corruption Foundation. (6968 persons as of February 15, 2023)
