= People's Freedom Party (Russia) =

People's Freedom Party Партия народной свободы Partiya narodnoy svobody
- Abbreviation: PARNAS; ПАРНАС
- President: Mikhail Kasyanov
- Founders: Vladimir Lysenko; Stepan Sulakshin; Vyacheslav Shostakovsky
- Founded: 17 November 1990 (RPR) 13 December 2010 (PARNAS) 16 June 2012 (merged as RPR–PARNAS) 5 July 2015 (re-named as PARNAS)
- Registered: 14 March 1991 5 May 2012 (re-registered)
- Dissolved: 25 May 2023
- Merger of: Forward, Russia!; Peasant Party of Russia; People's Freedom Party "For Russia without Lawlessness and Corruption"; United People's Party of Soldiers' Mothers
- Preceded by: Democratic Platform of the CPSU
- Headquarters: Moscow
- Youth wing: People's Democratic Union of Youth; Youth committee of Solidarity
- Membership (2011): 46,158
- Ideology: Republicanism; Anti-Putinism; Liberalism; Conservative liberalism; Federalism; Atlanticism; Anti-communism; Pro-Europeanism; Nemtsovism
- Political position: Centre-right
- National affiliation: Free Russia Forum
- European affiliation: Alliance of Liberals and Democrats for Europe Party
- Colours: Dark violet; Before 2012: Orange
- Slogan: За Россию без произвола и коррупции ('For Russia without Lawlessness and Corruption')

Website
- parnasparty.ru

The People's Freedom Party (Russian: Партия народной свободы, romanized: Partiya narodnoy svobody), often known by its short form PARNAS (Russian: ПАРНАС), and formerly the Republican Party of Russia – People's Freedom Party, and initially Republican Party of Russia, was a liberal-democratic political party in Russia. It was one of the first opposition parties founded in the final years of the Soviet Union.

In 2007, it was denied re-registration and declared to be dissolved by the Russian Supreme Court. It was only after the European Court of Human Rights ruled that the denial of registration was unlawful that it could restore its official registration in 5 May 2012.

The party was dissolved by Russia's Supreme Court on 25 May 2023 because it did not have the required number of branches and due to claims filed against existing branches by the Federal Taxation Service and the Ministry of Justice.

== History ==
=== Formation and early developments (1990–2006) ===
The Republican Party of Russia was founded in 1990 by members of the Democratic Platform of the CPSU who had become disillusioned with the party's unwillingness to reform. The foundation of the new party took place in November 1990. Nikolay Lysenko, Stepan Sulakshin and Vyacheslav Shostakovsky were elected as the three co-chairman. The Republican Party joined the Democratic Russia bloc, an umbrella organisation of pro-democracy movements. The Republican Party was close to the Social Democratic Party of Russia, which was founded earlier in 1990. The two parties shared similar program and there were attempts to merge. The Republican Party's program has been characterised as liberal and pragmatic; similarly to the Social Democratic Party, however, the Republican Party had internal factions: ranging from social democracy to social liberal to liberal conservative.

2005–2012 party logo

The RPR and the SDP formed a united faction (Объединенная депутатская группа РПРФ/СДПР) in the Russian Congress of People's Deputies (later, they fused with similar groups to form the faction 'Left Centre', which was pro-reform but more moderate than groups like the 'Radical Democrats', which advocated radical economic reforms). In contrast to the social democrats, the Republicans participated in the Movement of Democratic Reforms that was formed in summer, 1991 and included mostly liberal-minded former nomenklatura members (Alexander Yakovlev, Gavriil Popov et al.). The Republican Party initially supported both Yegor Gaidar's economic reforms and Boris Yeltsin in his conflict with the Supreme Soviet; later, some of the leaders turned more critical of Yeltsin. The Republican Party left the Democratic Russia bloc in October, 1993 due to disagreements with the bloc's policies.

Altogether, the party members won 12 seats in the newly elected parliament of 1993: 5 republicans within the Yabloko bloc and 7 from Democratic Choice of Russia. In the 1995 legislative election, the party ran within the Pamfilova – Gurev – N.Lysenko bloc, which failed to cross the 5% barrier. Lysenko and Ella Pamfilova won seat through majoritarian district.

At the end of 1998, Nikolay Lysenko, retaining the post of RP chairman, joined Yuri Luzhkov's Otechestvo bloc, whereas a number of the regional organisations of the Republican Party cooperated with small liberal parties like Right Cause or Sergey Kiriyenko's New Force etc.

In 1999, Lysenko won a parliament seat in a majoritarian district. In 2002, the party was reorganized into the Republican Party of Russia.

The party was described as the 'torchbearer' of liberal anti-Kremlin opposition during Vladimir Putin's reign in the early 2000s.

In 2006, Member of Parliament Vladimir Ryzhkov became party leader.

=== Dissolution and re-establishment (2007–2011) ===
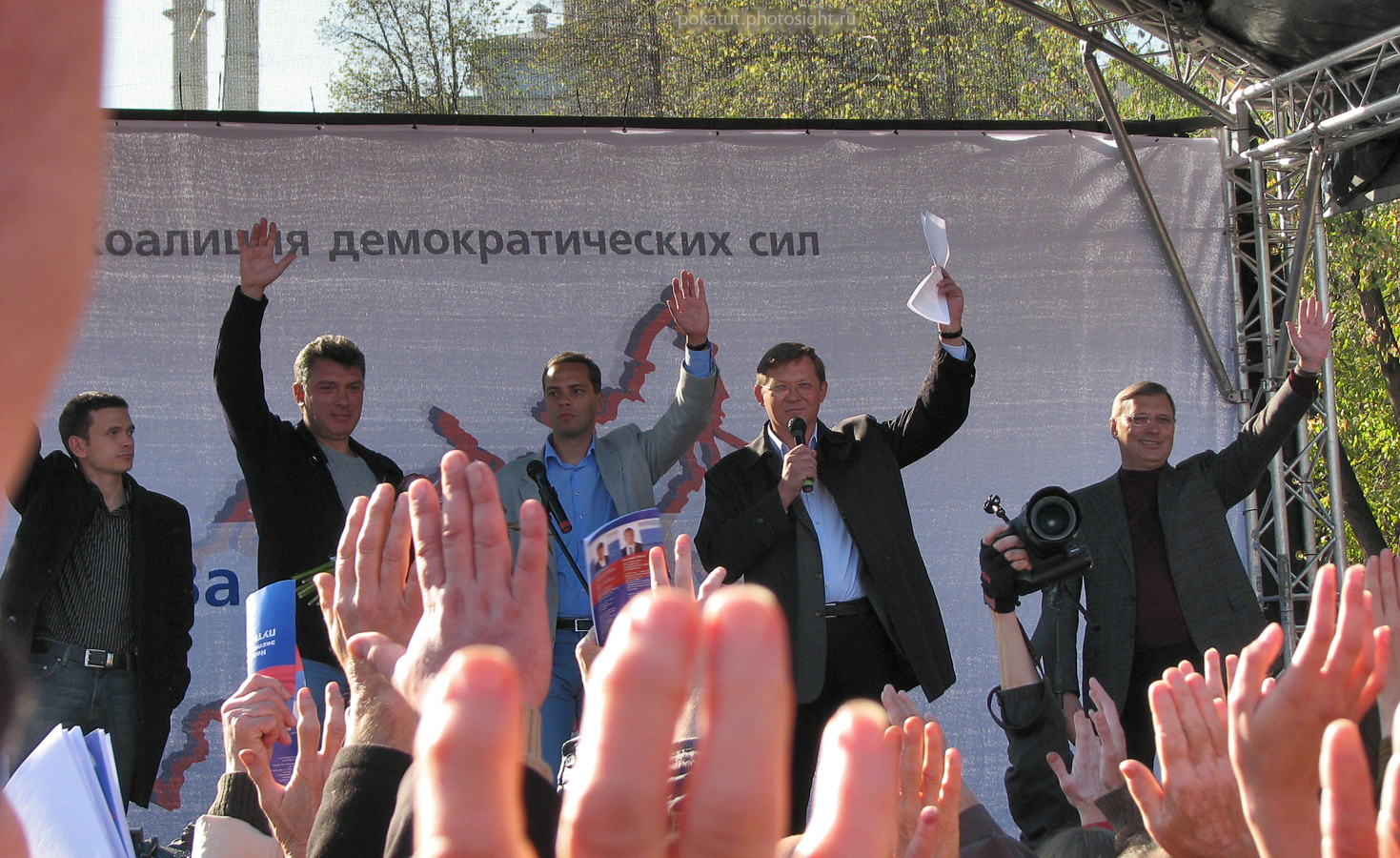
The first meeting of the coalition of democratic forces "For Russia without Lawlessness and Corruption" in Moscow on Bolotnaya Square on 9 October 2010

In 2007, the Russian Supreme Court ruled the party to be dissolved, according to Ryzhkov because of the opposition to the government. In 2011 the European Court of Human Rights ruled out the refusal to register the party was unlawful. Since 5 May 2012, the Justice Ministry has restored the state registration of the Republican Party of Russia.

In 2006–2010, the RPR was a member of the opposition coalition "The Other Russia". In 2010, Boris Nemtsov – one of president Putin's fiercest critics – set up the People's Freedom Party along with former Prime Minister Mikhail Kasyanov, former Member of Parliament Vladimir Ryzhkov and Vladimir Milov, which then formed a liberal coalition with the RPR entitled "For Russia without Lawlessness and Corruption". The People's Freedom Party worked on the base of Republican Party, and the two parties eventually merged in 2012.

In 2011, the party's dissolution was held to be unlawful by the European Court of Human Rights. In June 2011 the party applied for re-registration, but the authorities blocked this on the grounds of "the inconsistency in the party's charter and other documents filed for the official registration", a decision Nemtsov and Kasyanov said was politically motivated and that meant the party could not participate in the 2011 Russian legislative election. However, in January 2012, following the entry into force of the ECtHR's judgment, the Supreme Court of the Russian Federation quashed its 2007 decision to dissolve the party.

Member of Parliament for the A Just Russia party Gennady Gudkov discussed planning rallies against Vladimir Putin with RPR party leader Vladimir Ryzhkov during 2011. The Federal Security Service was closely monitoring Gudkov and secretly videotaped his discussions with Ryzhkov, which the FSB then released to the public to discredit him as a radical attempting to undermine the governing administration. The Russian parliament subsequently voted to expel Gudkov for his open criticism of Putin, the first such expulsion since 1995.

=== Merger, recent history and dissolution (2012–2023) ===
The Ministry of Justice recognized the merger of the Republican Party and the People's Freedom Party (RPR–PARNAS) on 2 August 2012, after the European Court of Human Rights ruled that the party should be restored in May of that year, and it supported the 2011–13 Russian protests, although since then the party has been mostly on the decline in influence among opposition circles.

In August 2012 Boris Nemtsov attacked President Putin, saying he had used his power to acquire for his personal use palaces, yachts, planes and other property that really belonged to the state. Nemtsov said that Putin had been taking state property for a long time, and said he "thinks it all belongs to him.".

During 2012 RPR-PARNAS participated in regional elections in Barnaul, winning 1 seat, and Saratov Oblast, Tuva, winning 2 seats.

==== 2013 electoral successes ====
Ratings of Sobyanin and Navalny among those who said they would vote in the 2013 Moscow mayoral election, according to Synovate Comcon polls
Time	Sobyanin	Navalny	Ref
29 August–2 September	60.1%	21.9%
22–28 August	63.9%	19.8%
15–21 August	62.5%	20.3%
8–14 August	63.5%	19.9%
1–7 August	74.6%	15.0%
25–31 July	76.2%	16.7%
18–24 July	76.6%	15.7%
11–16 July	76.2%	14.4%
4–10 July	78.5%	10.7%
27 June–3 July	77.9%	10.8%

Between 2011 and 2013, a series of protests had swept across Russia against electoral fraud after the 2011 Russian legislative election, and RPR-PARNAS had involved itself in the Moscow protest movement. Using its recently regained official party status, the party nominated a key leader of the protests and opposition figure Alexei Navalny for the September 2013 Moscow mayoral election, eliminating the need for Navalny to collect a huge number of signatures to be able to run. Navalny was president Vladimir Putin's top critic, and analysts agreed that he had specifically been released from imprisonment and allowed to run in the Kremlin-controlled election to give it a false sense of legitimacy. The pro-Putin candidate, Sergey Sobyanin of United Russia, even ordered the authorities to allow opposing parties to run against him, and personally requested that the Moscow municipal authorities helped Navalny collect the required number of signatures to run. Despite this, during the campaign Navalny got only a quarter as many TV mentions as his United Russia rival, mostly in the context of corruption charges against him.

In July Navalny was only polling around 8% and Sobyanin 78%. However, Navalny rapidly gained support at the expense of Sobyanin and did surprisingly well in the election, winning 27% of the vote and nearly forcing a run off against Sobyanin who, according to official results, only managed to win just over 50% of the votes. Navalny and his supporters maintained that the authorities had altered the results just enough to allow Sobyanin to cross the 50% threshold and avoid a runoff, which would have been a dramatic setback for the establishment.

In the aftermath of the election, Navalny was offered a position as the fourth co-chairman of RPR-PARNAS alongside Kasyanov, Boris Nemtsov and Vladimir Ryzhkov.

Despite the authorities banning the party from participating in some regions in the 2013 regional elections – likely for political reasons – RPR-PARNAS managed to achieve another electoral success in the autumn of 2013 when co-leader Nemtsov successfully managed to win a seat on the Yaroslavl regional parliament. Nemtsov's victory meant that the party won the right to run in state legislative elections without having to collect signatures, since it held a seat in one of Russia's regional parliaments. In turn, this made RPR-PARNAS the only "non-systemic" opposition party that had automatic access to the ballot in legislative elections.

In the concurrent September 2013 gubernatorial elections, all of the party's candidates were disqualified from running by the authorities.

It was in 2013 that Nemtsov also published a report on the upcoming 2014 Winter Olympics which were planned to be held in Sochi, Russia. He provided evidence there had been massive embezzlement by government officials, asserting that it amounted to about 50-60 percent of the stated final cost of the sporting event.

==== Assassination of co-leader Nemtsov ====
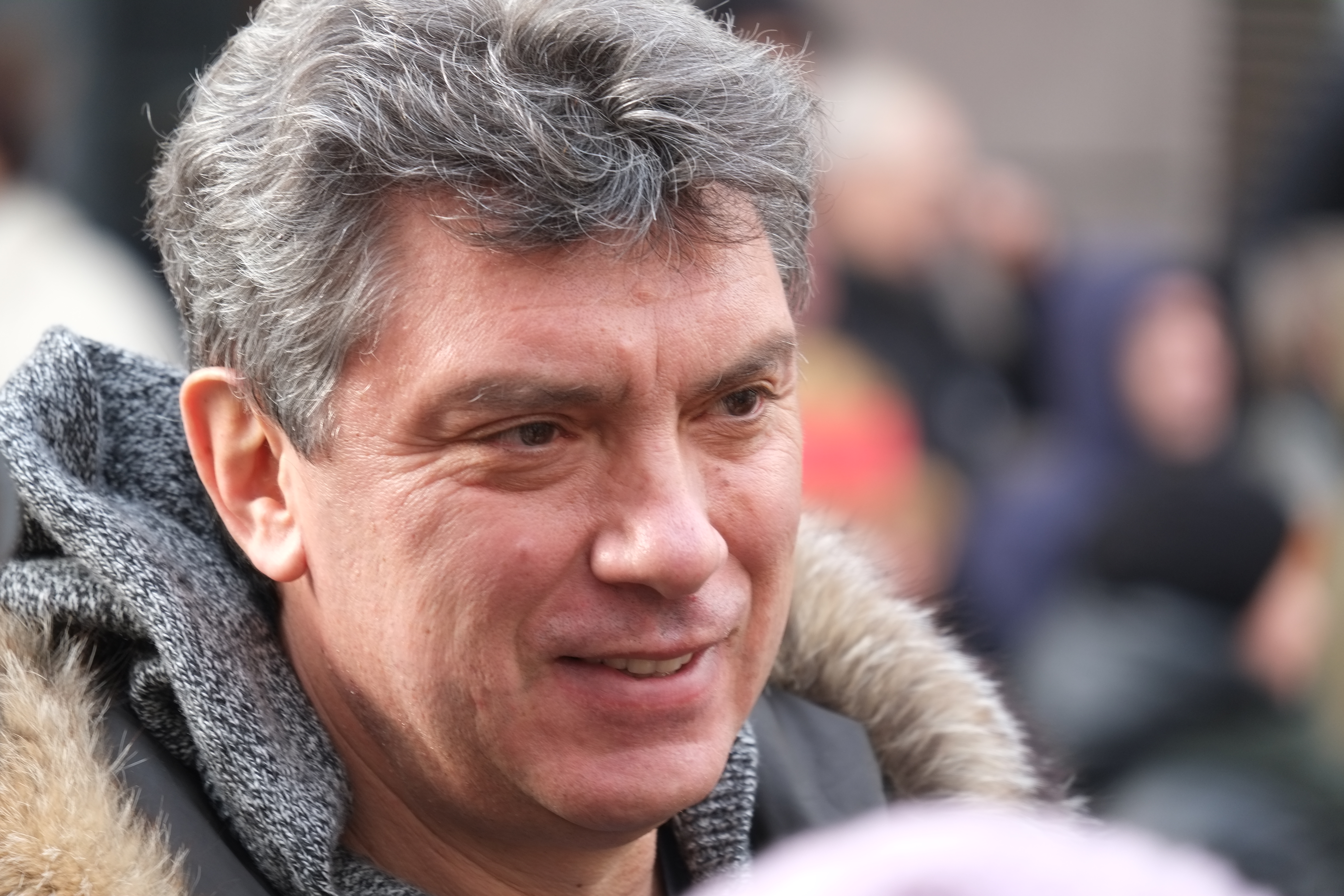
Influential party co-leader and leading Russian opposition figure Boris Nemtsov was assassinated in front of the Kremlin in February 2015

One of the party's co-leaders at this time was Boris Nemtsov, the party's most influential and talented mediator and a leading Russian opposition figure. Nemtsov had been one of Russia's leading economic reformers in the 1990s and also served as first deputy prime minister under President Boris Yeltsin. Nemtsov was assassinated in Moscow on 28 February 2015, being shot by an attacker in a car while on a bridge by the Kremlin. He died hours after appealing for support for an upcoming protest in Moscow against the war in Ukraine, and in a recent interview, Nemtsov had said he feared president Putin would have him killed because of his opposition to the war in Ukraine. Ukrainian president Petro Poroshenko described Nemtsov as "a bridge between Ukraine and Russia" and added "the murderers' shot has destroyed it. I think it is not by accident".

In the aftermath of the assassination, Kasyanov stated that he also feared for his life, noting that he was receiving death threats from nationalists. On this, he commented: "The authorities want to stop my political activity with threats, they want to force me out of the country. Their aim is to frighten me. But I have decided that I am going to continue with my activity."

Nemtsov's murder deprived RPR-PARNAS of one of its most influential figures and meant he was unable to complete his term as an elected member of the Yaroslavl regional parliament, the party's last remaining seat. However, because of the 5-year mandate Nemtsov won in 2013, the party would retain control of the seat until 2018.

==== Democratic Coalition formed for elections ====
In July 2015, the party congress voted to shorten the party's name to just People's Freedom Party (PARNAS). In April 2015 a number of opposition parties formed a unified Democratic Coalition to take part in the 2016 legislative election, as well as the 2015 regional elections as a test. This included PARNAS, as well as the Progress Party of Alexei Navalny, the Democratic Choice party of Vladimir Milov, as well as several others. The unregistered movements needed to band with PARNAS as they were rejected from the right to take part in elections as the necessary signatures they collected were deemed invalid, while PARNAS was officially registered as they still held the seat in the Yaroslavl Oblast Duma that had been won by Boris Nemtsov in 2013. In 2015, the coalition focused on four regions where their candidates were accepted by the Central Election Commission—Novosibirsk, Kaluga, Kostroma, and Magadan. However, in all these regions the party was harassed while campaigning, its members were arrested in Kostroma, and it was eventually denied the possibility of running its party candidates for assembly seats in Novosibirsk and Kaluga as regional election commissions and courts ruled its voter petition signatures invalid. They were only allowed to run in the Kostroma region in the end, where official results gave them 2.28% of the vote, not enough to obtain a seat in the regional legislature.

==== Poisoning of Kara-Murza ====
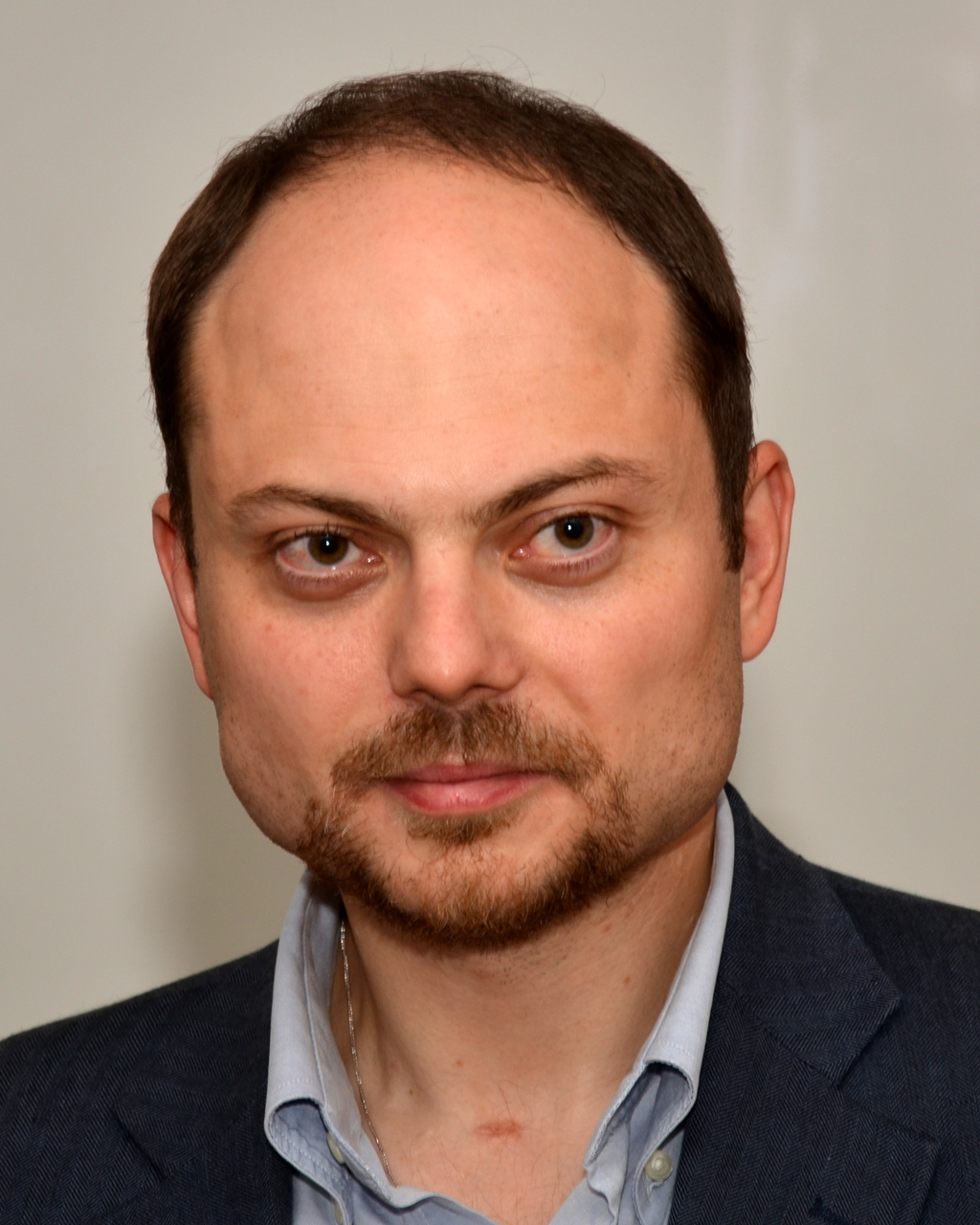
Leading party figure and later deputy leader Vladimir Kara-Murza was poisoned three months after co-leader Boris Nemtsov's assassination

Three months after Nemtsov was assassinated another leading figure in the party, Vladimir Kara-Murza, was nearly killed after being poisoned. Kara-Murza had been elected to the federal council of the party in June 2012, and was also elected to the Russian Opposition Coordination Council in October 2012. While in a meeting, Kara-Murza fell severely ill and began vomiting violently, eventually losing consciousness and falling into a coma. He was taken to hospital and spent a week in the coma. When he woke up he was told by doctors he had been poisoned by an unknown substance, and tests subsequently found high levels of heavy metals in his blood.

Kara-Murza's poisoning was widely believed to be politically motivated. Kara-Murza had been a close friend of Nemtsov, and there was a history of the Russian security services poisoning opponents of the Kremlin, such as Alexander Litvinenko and Anna Politkovskaya. Kara-Murza would be poisoned again in February 2017, again causing him to fall into a coma, but he also survived this attack.

In 2021, it was discovered that Kara-Murza had been trailed before his poisonings by the same Federal Security Service unit that poisoned the most prominent Russian opposition leader Alexei Navalny in 2020. Navalny had previously been RPR-PARNAS's candidate for mayor in the 2013 Moscow mayoral election and worked closely with the party.

After his recovery, Kara-Murza went on to be elected deputy leader of RPR-PARNAS in July.

==== Democratic Coalition and sabotaged 2016 legislative election campaign ====
Ultimately, the primary that was held to create the candidate list that would run for the coalition in the elections ended up breaking down, for multiple reasons. One key reason was the publication of a sex tape involving Mikhail Kasyanov and another PARNAS member, which caused Alexei Navalny and Ilya Yashin to call for Kasyanov to take part in the primaries himself rather than be permitted to be automatically placed on the candidate list (Kasyanov's position on the party ticket was part of the agreement in forming the coalition). State-run TV channel NTV also released a secretly-recorded video of Kasyanov criticising his coalition partners in private. Members of the "December 5" party proposed to hold a vote to decide whether the reserved spots on the party ticket should exist or not, and while the others supported the idea, PARNAS vetoed it. When Kasyanov refused to take part in the primaries they pulled their support, effectively ending the coalition. Yashin and several of his supporters also left the party.

PARNAS went on to hold its own primary but this was disrupted when hackers posted the personal information of voters who took part in it online. Unexpectedly, ultranationalist populist Vyacheslav Maltsev became the frontrunner of the primary, but the hacked information revealed that many of the voting accounts had the same passwords, suggesting that someone had been using bots to inflate the votes of select candidates. Kasyanov refused to step down after the debacle and stood in the 2016 elections, in which the party gained 0.7% of the vote and not a single seat in the 7th State Duma. The party had faced significant challenges in some regions, with the press rejecting the party's ads and local TV stations blocking their candidates from TV appearances, despite this being mandated by law.

In December 2016 deputy party leader Kara-Murza left PARNAS because of Maltsev's role in the party.

==== 2017 Moscow municipal election ====
During the 2017 Moscow municipal election, PARNAS partnered with the liberal party Yabloko in a coalition called 'United Democrats' to get candidates elected to local councils of deputies in municipal districts of Moscow. Specifically, PARNAS only gained two out of 1,502 seats up for election, but the coalition as a whole obtained over 260 seats.

==== 2018 presidential election ====
In October 2017, Kasyanov proposed that the liberal opposition candidates intending to run for the presidency in 2018—including Grigory Yavlinsky, Alexei Navalny, and Kseniya Sobchak—form a coalition and field a single candidate in order to increase their chances. In early December PARNAS revealed that this coalition was never formed and announced that they supported the three opposition candidates, so the party did not have any of its own candidates run for the presidency.

==== Contentious loss of last seat ====
In September 2018 regional elections were held in which the party's only seat in a legislature, the Yaroslavl regional parliament, was up for re-election. The seat had originally been won by party co-chair Boris Nemtsov in 2013, before he was assassinated in 2015. In August 2018 the party attempted to register their candidates for the election in Yaroslavl, but pro-Putin parties Patriots of Russia and the Liberal Democratic Party challenged the PARNAS party ticket in court claiming their candidates list violated certain regulations — a common tactic used by the authorities to bar the opposition from elections. In late August the Yarslavl Regional Court denied PARNAS the right to run in the election, and, after an appeal by the party, the Russian Supreme Court upheld this decision on 7 September. The decision meant that the party were condemned to losing their last seat, meaning that the party lost the right to automatically run in State Duma legislative elections.

==== 2023 dissolution ====
The party was dissolved by Russia's Supreme Court on May 25, 2023 because it did not have the required number of branches and due to claims filed against existing branches by the Federal Taxation Service and the Ministry of Justice. The Supreme Court cited the absence of the party’s offices in at least half of the 83 federal subjects of Russia as the primary reason. The Ministry of Justice claimed that the party’s number of branches had dropped from 47 to 40 since the start of 2023. PARNAS claimed the party still had 44 offices and that it could not have offices in the four annexed territories of Ukraine by Russia on 30 September 2022 (who are internationally recognized as a part of Ukraine), since (PARNAS alleged) those regions did not yet have full-fledged executive authorities.

== Ideology ==
The ideology of the RPR-PARNAS was liberalism, federalism and human rights. In his interview, Kasyanov said "there is no higher value for the government than human rights." He defined ideological stance of PRP-PARNAS as right-of-center liberalism.

The main principles of the PARNAS party program included securing the individual rights of Russian citizens and equality of all before law, and that the government should be democratic, controlled by the public and should serve the interest of the people. The party condemned the Bolsheviks who seized power in 1917 and the existence of the Soviet Union, which it considered tyrannical, and modeled itself after the Constitutional Democratic Party that existed during the late Russian Empire. It also promised to declassify all KGB and other Soviet documents as part of a "decommunization" program and ban all promotion of the communist regime. For Russia's form of government it proposed to create a parliamentary republic and increase local self-governance. In addition, PARNAS wanted to reform the judiciary to be truly independent, remove government control over the mass media, and promote small business and entrepreneurs over oligarchs.

The party considered the 2014 Russian annexation of Crimea illegal and vowed to return control of Crimea back to Ukraine; as such, PARNAS did not campaign in Crimea in the 2016 Russian parliamentary elections. According to its 2015 election platform, it stated that it wanted Russia to become a partner of NATO and the European Union, as well as to end military interventions in other countries.

== Significance to the Russian opposition ==
In Russia, political opposition during Putin's presidency tends to be more visible through protest than in legislatures and executive offices. The main three 'opposition' parties in parliament, often referred to as the 'systemic opposition', do not represent a serious threat to the government and dominant ruling party United Russia. The Communist Party has declined in strength since the 1990s and also supports United Russia on various issues, while the far-right LDPR and socialist A Just Russia — Patriots — For Truth parties, both believed to be government creations, largely support President Putin and the government. Most of the major parties fully support the president, and only the liberal Yabloko and PARNAS parties strongly condemn Putin's policies. Thus, the most prominent democratic opposition parties in Russia have been Yabloko and PARNAS. Experts consider these parties to be the two political forces that are true opposition parties, and they were the only two parties out of the 14 that competed in the 2016 legislative election that could be considered as such.

When in 2012 new laws were introduced which allowed the formation of new parties, several new opposition parties sprang up, but RPR-PARNAS held an advantage over these other parties as it was led by several long-standing leaders of anti-Putin opposition such as Nemtsov and Kasyanov. This gave the party particular prominence.

Yabloko and PARNAS are generally more politicized than the 'systemic opposition', leading campaigns against electoral fraud and corruption while voicing support for civil rights. Both frequently demand the release of political prisoners, media freedoms, and changes in political regulations, and have advocated direct elections of mayors and opposed oppressive legislation such as laws and restrictions on public meetings.

Amongst all parties, Yabloko and PARNAS have had the highest percentage of ballot-access denials by authorities, despite their overall limited number of attempts to register candidates.

== Leaders ==
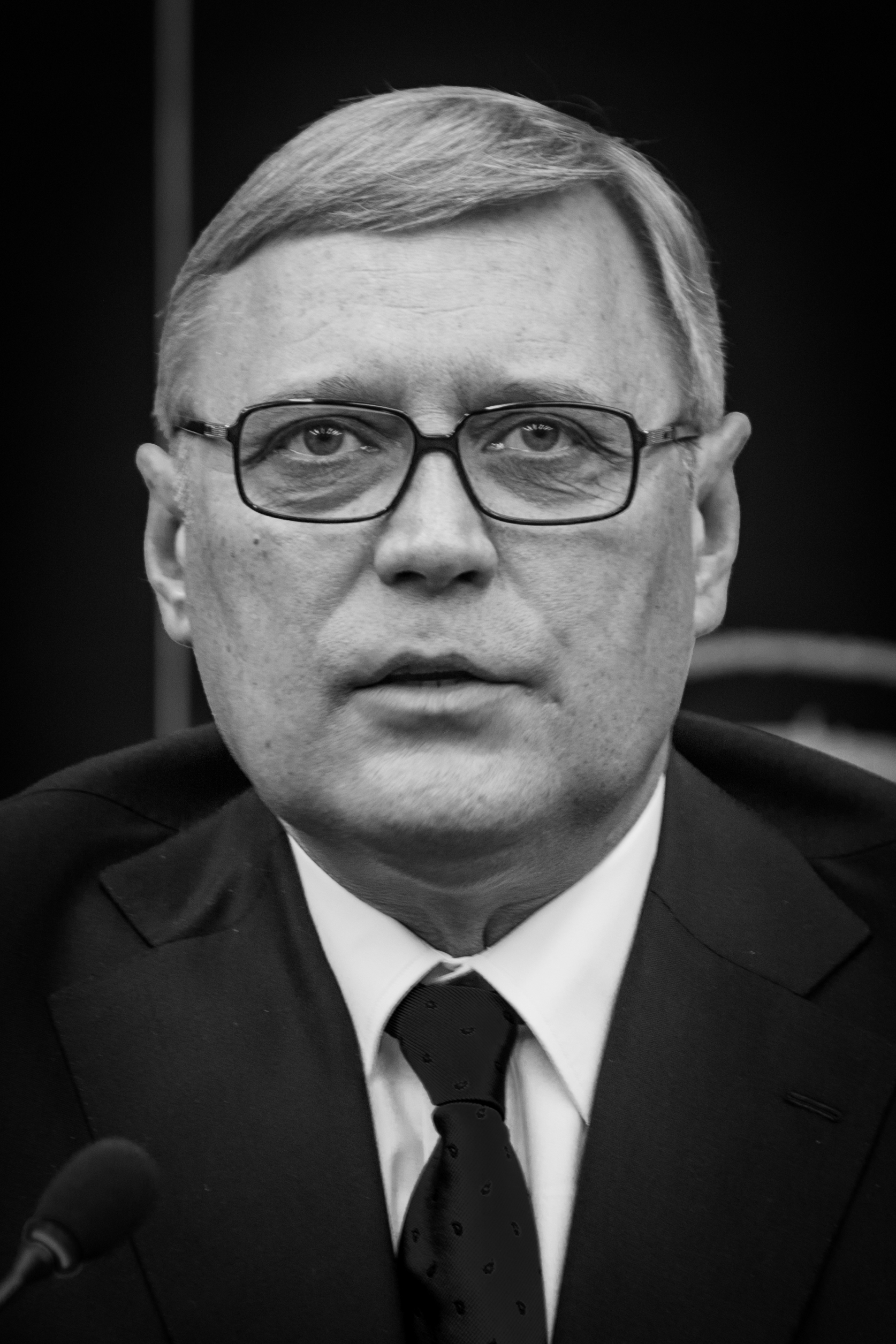
Mikhail Kasyanov

Co-chairs

- Mikhail Kasyanov (2012–2023)
- Vladimir Ryzhkov (2006–2014)
- Boris Nemtsov (2012 – until his assassination on 27 February 2015)

Federal Political Council of RPR-PARNAS

Bureau:

- Mikhail Kasyanov
- Boris Nemtsov (until his assassination on 27 February 2015)
- Ilya Yashin (until 16 December 2016)
- Valentina Melnikova (former co-chair of the party)
- Sergey Aleksashenko
- Konstantin Merzlikin
- Vadim Prokhorov
- Alexander Berstenev

Others:

- Igor Stasovskiy
- Vladimir Vladimirovich Kara-Murza (until 16 December 2016)
- Vyacheslav Maltsev (until 2017)

== Electoral results ==
=== Legislative elections ===
Election	Party leader	Performance					Rank	Government
Election	Party leader	Votes	%	± pp	Seats	+/–	Rank	Government
1993	Run into the Yabloko and Choice of Russia lists				12 / 450	New	6th	Opposition
1995	Ella Pamfilova	1,106,812	1.63%	New	2 / 450	▼10	▼14th	Opposition
1999	Only constituencies				1 / 450	▼1	▼15th	Opposition
2003	Viktor Pokhmelkin (as NC–AR)	509,302	0.85%	▲0.85	1 / 450	0	▲12th	Opposition
2007	Did not contest							
2011	Party was part of For Russia without Lawlessness and Corruption coalition that boycotted the elections							
2016	Mikhail Kasyanov	384,675	0.74%	▲0.74	0 / 450	0	▲11th	Extra-parliamentary
2021	Did not contest							

== See also ==
- The Other Russia
- Yabloko
