= Vladimir Milov =

Russian politician and economist (born 1972)

- Владимир Милов
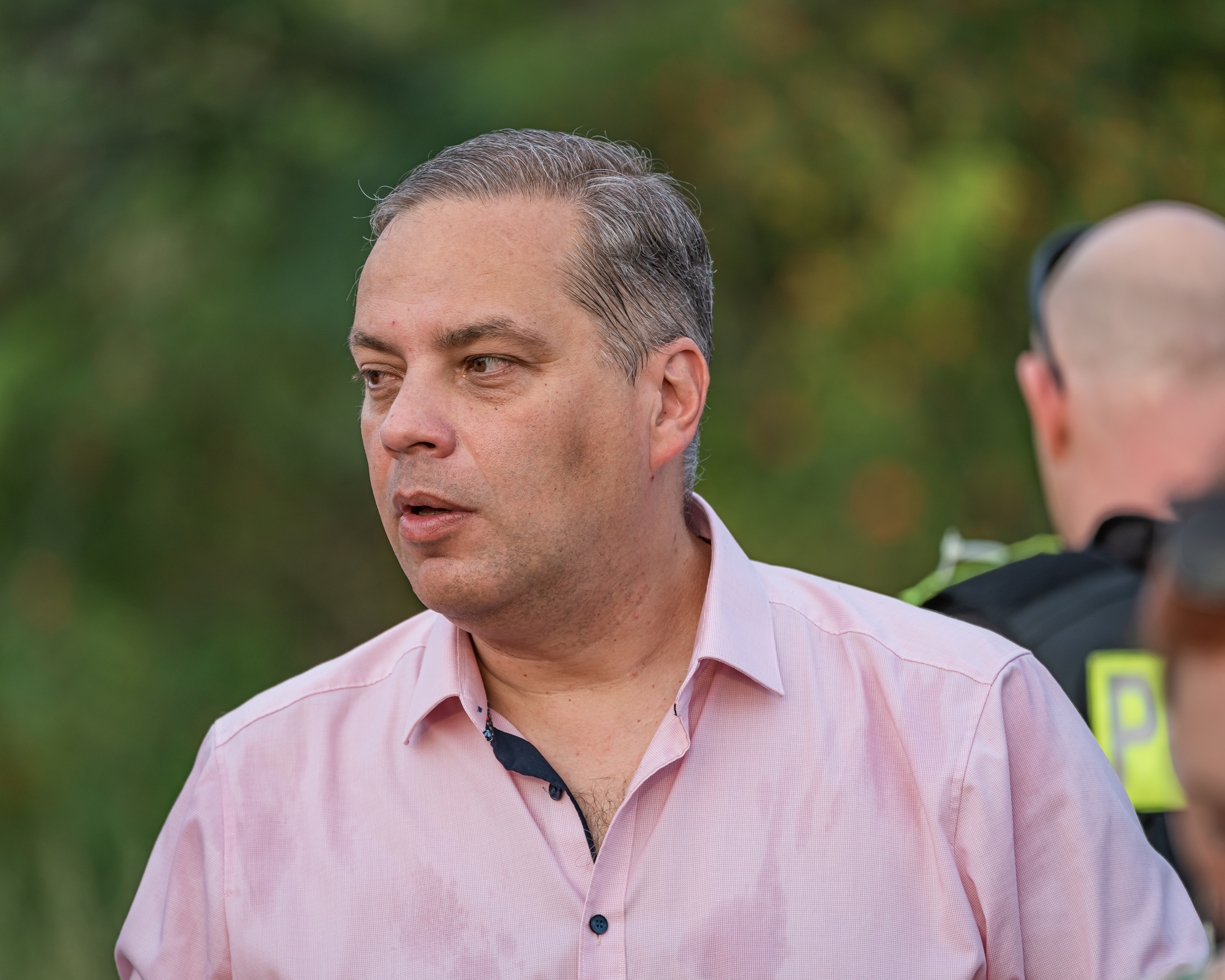
- Milov in 2024

Deputy Minister of Energy of Russia
- In office 14 May 2002 – 30 October 2002
- Prime Minister: Mikhail Kasyanov
- Minister: Igor Yusufov

Personal details
- Born: 18 June 1972 (age 54) Kemerovo, Russian SFSR, Soviet Union
- Party: Russia of the Future (since 2018)
- Other political affiliations: Solidarnost (2008–2010); Democratic Choice (2010–2015)
- Spouse: Natalya Stepanova
- Children: 1
- Education: Moscow State Mining University
- Occupation: Politician; economist
- Website: milov.org

Vladimir Stanislavovich Milov (Russian: Владимир Станиславович Милов; born 18 June 1972) is a Russian politician, economist and the former chairman of the Russian political party Democratic Choice from May 2012 to December 2015. He served as Deputy Minister of Energy of the Russian Federation from May to October 2002. He was a member of the Federal Political Council of the democratic movement Solidarnost (2008–2010) and one of the founders of the coalition "For Russia without Lawlessness and Corruption". He was also the president of the Institute for Energy Policy, a Moscow-based independent think tank until 2013.

== Early life and education ==
Vladimir Milov graduated from Moscow State Mining University in 1994. In 1997–2001, he worked for the natural monopoly regulator of Russia, the Federal Energy Commission of Russia, serving in 1999–2001 as the head of its economic analysis department. In 2001 he headed an expert team within the Center for Strategic Research, a government-linked think tank.

== Career ==
=== Civil service (2000–2002) ===
On 14 March 2000, Vladimir Milov was promoted to the civilian service rank of 2nd class State Councillor of the Russian Federation.

In December 2001, Milov was appointed adviser to the Minister of Energy of the Russian Federation and in May 2002, he was appointed Deputy Minister of Energy of Russia in Kasyanov's government. He resigned in October 2002.

=== Think-tank (2002–2011) ===
In November 2002, Milov founded and became the head of the research fund Institute for Strategic Development of the Fuel and Energy Complex (in 2003, it was renamed to Institute for Energy Policy). From September 2005 to August 2006, the institute was one of the ten most mentioned economic expert centers in the country and the first on energy issues. By 2010, the institute had ceased to engage in real activities, and the legal entity was liquidated in December 2013.

In 2002, he headed an interdepartmental working group on the development of the energy strategy for Russia for the period up to 2020. He took part in the development of Russian legislation on the electric power industry, regulation and taxation of the energy sector.

Milov authored numerous analytical materials, concept papers and publications on energy policy and infrastructure development in Russia. He collaborated on state programs for reforming the country's gas industry, electric power industry, and railway transport, and proposed a reform project for Gazprom, which was rejected by Vladimir Putin.

Milov co-authored with the late Boris Nemtsov in 2008 a report on the Putin administration's failures, which was suppressed. They later published it in 2011 as an electioneering plank for the People's Freedom Party together with former Prime Minister Mikhail Kasyanov and Vladimir Ryzhkov, only to be met by accusations from Putin of "stealing from the state". When the authors attempted to file a defamation lawsuit it was thrown out by Savyolovsky District Court Judge Tatyana Adamova, in a move that was applauded by Putin's lawyer, Yelena Zabralova. Milov and Nemtsov also published a paper in 2011 on the subject with Foreign Affairs.

=== Candidate for office (2008–2016) ===
In December 2008, Milov co-founded the opposition movement Solidarnost. He was one of the leaders of the organization until May 2010.

In 2009, Milow ran for the Moscow City Duma as an independent candidate, but was not admitted to register.

In February 2010, Milov was elected a leader of the social movement "Democratic Choice". He resigned on December 20, 2015, after a series of internal disagreements.

Since 2016, Milov began actively participating in Alexei Navalny's presidential campaign. Milov was mentioned as one of the co-authors of Navalny's platform that was published on December 13, 2017.

=== Broadcaster ===
Since 19 October 2019, Milov has been broadcasting a weekly program about international politics, Hugs With Dictators, on his YouTube channel. He was living in political exile at least since the 2022 Russian invasion of Ukraine. He continues to be a podcast guest and student of Russian politics in January 2023.
