= Democratic Choice (Russia, 2010) =

Political Party in Russia

Democratic Choice Демократический выбор
- Abbreviation: DemChoice (English); ДемВыбор (Russian)
- Leader: Sergey Zhavoronkov; Igor Drandin
- Founder: Vladimir Milov
- Founded: 28 February 2010; 16 years ago
- Split from: Union of Right Forces; Solidarnost
- Headquarters: Moscow
- Youth wing: Youth Democratic Choice
- Membership (2010): 500
- Ideology: Conservative liberalism Liberal conservatism National liberalism Anti-communism
- Political position: Centre-right to right-wing
- Colours: Blue
- Slogan: "We make politics in a new way" (Russian: "Мы делаем политику по-новому") "It's time to win!" (Russian: "Время побеждать!")
- Seats in the State Duma: 0 / 450
- Seats in the Regional Parliaments: 0 / 3,994

Website
- http://demvybor.ru

Democratic Choice (DemChoice; Russian: Демократический выбор; ДемВыбор; Demokraticheskiy vybor, DemVybor) is a Russian right-wing conservative liberal and national liberal political party, that defended the principles of democratic development of the country. Founded on February 28, 2010, at a conference in Moscow. Registered by the Ministry of Justice as a regional public organization. On September 20, 2012, officially registered by the Ministry of Justice as a political party.

In 2017, the Supreme Court suspended the activities of the party at the suit of the Ministry of Justice.

== History ==
- On February 28, 2010, at a conference of the Moscow city branch of the Union of Right Forces, the name, Charter and Political Manifesto of the organization were adopted. Vladimir Milov was elected chairman of the Democratic Choice. Igor Drandin and Anna Evdokimova were elected vice-chairmen.
- On April 27, 2010, the Democratic Choice group was created in the Moscow city branch of the Solidarnost
- On May 24, 2010, a group of activists of the Yekaterinburg branch of the Solidarnost decided to create an initiative group to create a regional organization of Democratic Choice in the Sverdlovsk Region.
- June 9, 2010 - the website of the organization was launched.
- On November 13, 2010, the General Meeting of the "Democratic Choice" was held, at which Vladimir Milov was again elected the chairman of the organization, and Igor Drandin, Sergey Zhavoronkov, Stanislav Dukhnevich were elected as his deputies. Also, the Coordination Council numbering 17 people was elected and the Political Manifesto of the RPO "Democratic Choice" and the Political Program (short version) were adopted
- On January 22, 2012, the General Meeting of the “Democratic Choice” was held, at which the governing bodies were re-elected (chairman Vladimir Milov, his deputies Igor Drandin, Sergey Zhavoronkov, Kirill Shulika, the Coordination Council and the Audit Commission). In addition, the founder of the Yabloko, Grigory Yavlinsky, spoke at the general meeting. Sergey Grigorov was elected Executive Secretary of the Coordination Council
- On May 26, 2012, a congress of a political organization was held, at which a decision was made to transform the movement into a political party.
- On September 20, 2012, the Democratic Choice was registered by the Ministry of Justice as a party.
- On September 8, 2013, Democratic Choice took part in the elections for the first time as a registered party.
- On November 16, 2013, an extraordinary congress of the Democratic Choice party was held in Moscow, where the results of the party's participation in the September regional and local elections, prospects for participation in election campaigns in the near future, the political situation in the country, the goals and objectives of the party were discussed. The congress also held re-elections of the party leadership and adopted amendments to the party charter. The deputy chairmen of the party were elected: Igor Drandin and Sergey Zhavoronkov.
- On May 11, 2017, the Supreme Court of Russia from July 21, 2017, suspended the activities of the Democratic Choice party for three months in connection with violations of reporting on the activities of the political association.
- On December 1, 2017, the party was liquidated by the Ministry of Justice.

=== Split ===
On December 20, 2015, the chairman of the Democratic Choice party, Vladimir Milov, at a meeting of the Federal Political Council, proposed expelling his deputies Igor Drandin and Sergei Zhavoronkov from the party. This decision did not receive the required number of votes, after which Milov himself resigned from the post of chairman. Supporters of Drandin and Zhavoronkov cited the lack of success in the party under the leadership of Vladimir Milov over the past four years, his authoritarian methods of leadership, and lack of funding as the reason for the split. Milov explained the split by the machinations of the Kremlin. According to the members of the Federal Political Council of the party K. Kolesnichenko, V. Milov, P. Milovanov, O. Stepanov, K. Shulik, their opponents are carrying out a raider seizure of the organization.

On July 12, 2016, supporters of Drandin and Zhavoronkov initiated a meeting of the Federal Political Council (FPS) of the Democratic Choice political party. The FPS meeting was convened at the request of 6 out of 11 current FPS members. The meeting was attended by 6 members of the FPS. FPS decided to support the Yabloko in the elections on September 18, 2016, and appointed the Democratic Choice party congress for November 19, 2016. Vladimir Milov did not recognize the results of this FPC.

On December 18, 2016, a congress of the Democratic Choice party took place. At the event, a new party leadership was elected, the congress delegates adopted a manifesto and discussed the upcoming elections. The leader of the Yabloko party, Grigory Yavlinsky, spoke at the congress; he welcomed the emergence of a right-wing liberal party in Russia. The co-chairs of the party were elected: Sergey Zhavoronkov, Igor Drandin and Grigorov Sergey Grigorov.

=== Political Actions ===
- On June 12, 2010, about 100 participants and supporters of the Democratic Choice made a boat trip along the Moscow River in honor of the Day of Russia. During the rally, the police put pressure on its participants.
- On June 15, 2010, the conference “Elections 2011-2012: What is the Democratic Opposition to Do?” Organized by the Democratic Choice, was held, at which opposition representatives and political experts presented their views and plans on the participation of the democratic opposition in the parliamentary and presidential elections
- On September 25, 2010, in Moscow, on Bolotnaya Square, was held a rally for the direct election of the mayor of the capital. The rally, according to various sources, was attended by from one and a half to four thousand people.
- On July 23, 2017, in Moscow, the Democratic Choice was among the organizers of the march "For Free Internet".
- On August 20, 2017, was a picket on the anniversary of the August putsch.
- On July 23, 2017, in Moscow, the Democratic Choice was among the organizers of the second rally "For Free Internet".
- On February 25, 2018, in Moscow and St. Petersburg took part in the march in memory of Boris Nemtsov

== Ideology ==
The party positions itself as a new generation party with a clear ideology that remains committed to right-wing values:

— Tax cuts and free enterprise;

— Immigration restrictions;

— Independent Courts;

— Demonopolization and price reduction;

— Compact and professional army and police;

— Radical reduction of the state apparate;

— Democratic but firm and decisive government;

== Youth branch ==
There is a youth branch of the party. Youth Democratic Choice supports a right turn in the economy, an end to low-skilled labor, complete freedom of speech, a strong contract army, and a nation state.

=== Chairpersons ===
- Anatoly Chumansky (2011–2013)
- Oleg Stepanov (2013–2015)
- Yaroslav Kolobkov (2015–2017)
- Robert Wright (2017–2018)
- Anatoly Kalinin (с 2019)

== International contacts ==
The party cooperates with other right-wing forces in Europe, such as the TS-LKD. The closest in spirit to the all-European association is the European People's Party. At the beginning of 2015, the Youth wing of the Democratic Choice received the status of an observer member in the European Democrat Students association, the youth wing of the EPP.
