= Vladimir Ryzhkov =

Russian historian and politician

- Владимир Рыжков
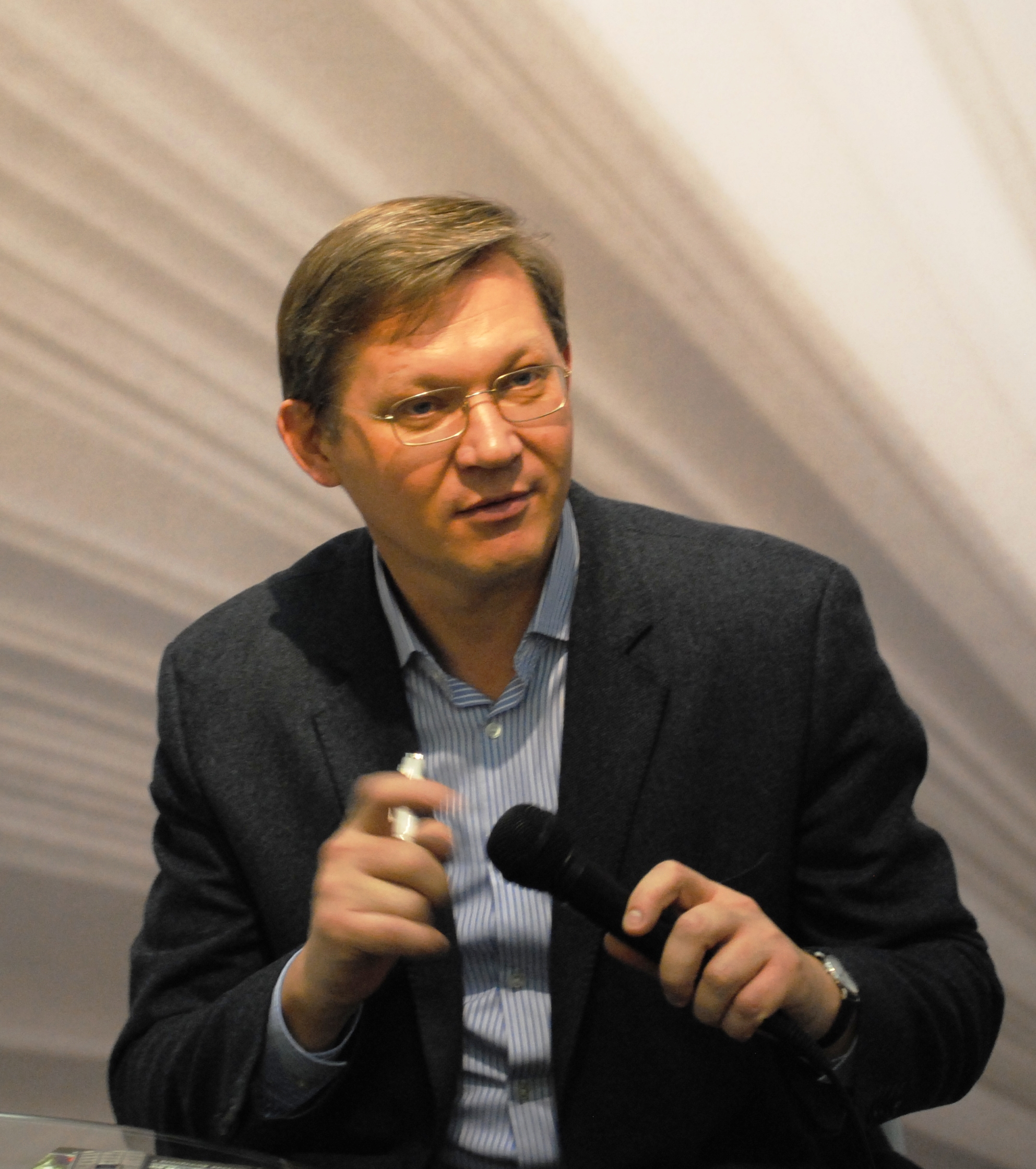
- Ryzhkov in 2021

First Deputy Chairman of the State Duma
- In office 10 September 1997 – 3 February 1999
- Preceded by: Alexander Shokhin
- Succeeded by: Boris Kuznetsov

Member of the State Duma
- In office 1993–2007

Personal details
- Born: 3 September 1966 (age 60) Rubtsovsk, Altai Krai, Russian SFSR, Soviet Union (now Russia)
- Party: Yabloko
- Education: Altai State University
- Website: ryzkov.ru
- Vladimir Ryzhkov's voice Recorded May 2013

Speech of Vladimir Ryzhkov at the first meeting of the coalition of democratic forces "For Russia without Lawlessness and Corruption" in Moscow on Bolotnaya Square on 9 October 2010

External videos
- RPR leader Vladimir Ryzhkov talks about 1991 events

Vladimir Aleksandrovich Ryzhkov (Russian: Влади́мир Алекса́ндрович Рыжко́в; born 3 September 1966) is a Russian historian and liberal politician, a former co-chair of People's Freedom Party (2006–2014) and former Russian State Duma member (1993–2007), First Deputy Chairman of the State Duma and the leader of parliamentary group Our Home – Russia. He is a candidate of historical sciences, a professor of the Higher School of Economics, and an anchorman of a number of Echo of Moscow radio programs.

Vladimir Ryzhkov was a deputy head of administration of Altai Krai in 1991-1993 and represented the city of Barnaul in the State Duma in 1993-2007. Since 2006 Vladimir Ryzhkov is a co-chair of registered political party Republican Party of Russia – People's Freedom Party (RPR-PARNAS). He was one of members of The Other Russia coalition and a participant of Dissenters' Marches and other meetings. He was also an active speaker during 2011–2013 Russian protest rallies.

== Career ==
Ryzhkov was first elected in 1993 and later headed a group of deputies from Russia's Choice (Выбор России), the main pro-Kremlin party under Russian president Boris Yeltsin. In 1997, he was elected Deputy President of the State Duma, becoming the youngest Speaker in its history. On 19 September 1998, Ryzhkov was appointed Deputy Prime Minister of the Russian Federation on social issues, but turned down the offer only days later. In the general elections of 1999, he ran as an independent, but later joined the pro-Yeltsin coalition Unity Party of Russia. After Vladimir Putin's election in 2000, Ryzhkov was dismissed from the coalition. In 2003 general election, Vladimir Ryzhkov successfully ran as an independent, becoming one of the last liberal voices to remain in parliament. He cofounded the Democratic Alternative association with another independent deputy Mikhail Zadornov in 2004.

In 2005, Ryzhkov became head of the Republican Party of Russia (Республиканская партия России), which in 2007 was refused registration for the parliament elections later that year. In 2011, party's dissolution was held to be unlawful by the European Court of Human Rights. In January 2012, following the entry into force of the ECtHR’s judgment, the Supreme Court of the Russian Federation quashed its 2007 decision to dissolve the party. On 8 February 2014, Ryzhkov left People's Freedom Party and joined Civil Initiative party later this year. In 2016, Ryzhkov left Civil Initiative party and joined Yabloko.

Since 2006, Ryzhkov has been affiliated with the Other Russia opposition coalition. Vladimir Ryzhkov represented the city of Barnaul in the Siberian Altai Region in the Russian State Duma in 1993-2007. He was first elected in 1993 and worked in a group of deputies from "Vibor Rossii", the main reformists party under Russian President Boris Yeltsin. In 1997, he was elected first Deputy President of the State Duma, becoming the youngest Speaker in its history. In the general election of 1999, he was elected as an independent deputy. After Vladimir Putin's election in 2000, Ryzhkov soon became one of the leading opposition figures. In the 2003 general elections, Vladimir Ryzhkov successfully ran as an independent deputy, becoming one of the last liberal voices to remain in parliament. In 2005, he became head of the Republican Party of Russia which in 2007 was refused registration for the parliament elections later this year. Because of a recent law requiring all candidates be nominated by political parties, Ryzhkov could not run as an independent. He became professor of Higher School of Economics (Moscow), writing political analysis in the independent 'Novaya Gazeta' and the English-language 'The Moscow Times' and 'The St. Petersburg Times', presenting a political talk show on Echo of Moscow radio, the chairman of the public organization "Vibor Rossii". He is the author of the books Fourth Republic and The Granted Democracy and the co-coordinator of the international public committee "Russia in the United Europe".

In 2021, Ryzhkov won the by-elections to the Moscow City Duma.

== See also ==
- Yevgeny Primakov's Cabinet
