= Elena Osipova =

Elena Osipova may refer to:

- Elena Osipova (archer) (born 1993), Russian archer
- Elena Osipova (sociologist) (1927–2018), Russian philosopher and sociologist
- Elena Tchaikovskaia (born 1939), née Osipova, Russian figure skating coach and choreographer
- Yelena Osipova (Russian activist) (born 1945), Russian artist and activist
