= Yav (disambiguation) =

Yav is one of the three dimensions or qualities of the cosmos.

Yav may also refer to:

- Mayne Island Water Aerodrome, by IATA code
- Yangben language, by ISO 639 code
- Yav (album), a 2014 album by the Russian pagan metal band Arkona
- Yav Art Group, street art group from Russia
