= Elena Osipova (sociologist) =

Russian philosopher and sociologist (1927–2018)

Elena Vladimirovna Osipova is a Russian philosopher and sociologist.

== Education and career ==
Elena Osipova graduated from the Lomonosov University in 1950, where she went on to obtain a candidate degree in 1954. For her candidate degree, she performed research in the philosophy of Enlightenment in Poland. In 1974, she successfully defended her thesis “Sociology of Émile Durkheim” and became a Doctor of Sciences. She led research at the Institute of Philosophy of the Russian Academy of Sciences. Her publications have to do mainly with the history of Western sociology, the problems of power, and the question of the relationship between personality and society.

== Membership in learned societies ==
Elena Osipova has been a full member of the Russian Academy of Social Sciences since 1995.

== Bibliography ==
- Осипова, Елена Владимировна // Осипов Г.В. (общ. ред.) Российская социологическая энциклопедия (Russian Sociological Encyclopaedia). М., Норма-Инфра-М, —1998. — 672 с. (Page 355)
- Осипова, Елена Владимировна // Большая биографическая энциклопедия (Great Biographical Encyclopaedia)
