= Decommunization (Russian political movement) =

Russian opposition anti-communist political movement

Decommunization Декоммунизация
- Leader: Dmitry Tsorionov
- Founder: Dmitry Tsorionov
- Founded: 2017
- Dissolved: 4 March 2022 (temporarily)
- Ideology: Anti-communism; Anti-Sovietism; Anarcho-capitalism; Right-libertarianism
- Political position: Right-wing
- Colours: Black
- Slogan: «Our goal is the complete #decommunization of Russia.» (Russian: «Наша цель — полная #Декоммунизация России.»)

Party flag

Website
- VK page

The Decommunization (Russian: Декоммунизация, romanized: Dekommunizatsiya) is a Russian opposition and anti-communist political movement founded by right-libertarian orthodox activist Dmitry "Enteo" Tsorionov. It seeks the renaming of streets named after Bolshevik leaders and the dismantling of monuments to Soviet leaders.

== History ==
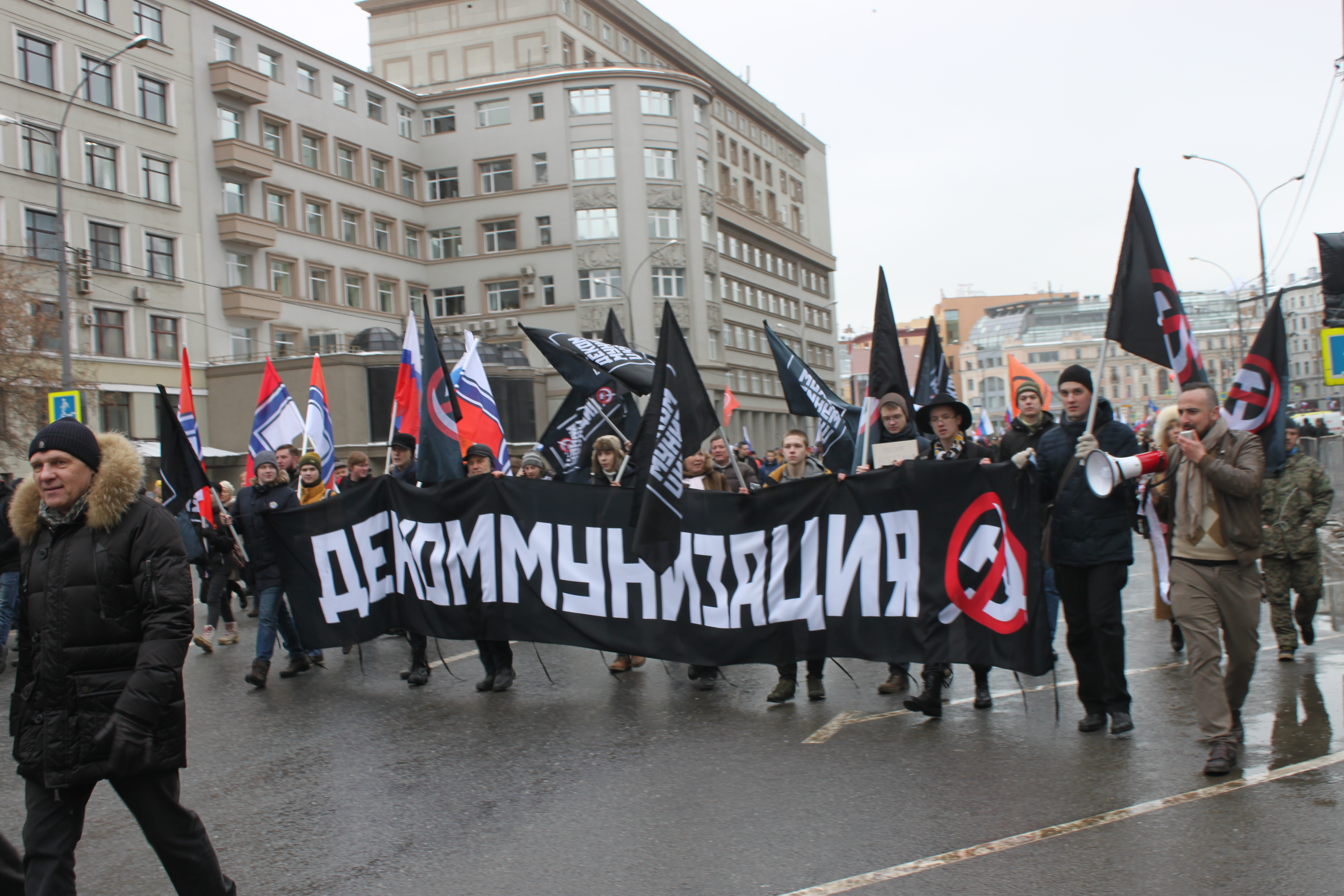
2019 column of movement at a rally in memory of Boris Nemtsov

The movement was founded in the summer of 2017 by Dmitry Tsorionov and a number of supporters of the ideas of the White movement.

On 7 August 2018, the movement held a joint action with Pussy Riot against the torture of prisoners "FSIN = GULAG". A few days later, the action participants were detained.

On April 22, 2019, the birthday of Vladimir Lenin, Decommunization activists held actions in Moscow and Yekaterinburg. As reported on the project page on VKontakte, a poster was hung on the monument to Lenin on Kaluga Square in Moscow with the inscription "Subject to dismantling as part of decommunization."

On November 8, 2019, the movement, together with Pussy Riot, held a rally near the Kremlin in support of political prisoners. Then the activists of the two projects posted a banner "Stop Gulag" on the Bolshoy Moskvoretsky Bridge. Shortly after the action, the participants were detained.

The movement also participated in rallies in memory of Boris Nemtsov.

With the beginning of the Russian invasion of Ukraine, the movement temporarily suspended its activities, saying that "despite all our efforts, the country has finally returned to its totalitarian past".

== See also ==
- Decommunization in Russia
