= Elena Kovalskaya =

- Occupation: Curator, theatre critic, teacher
- Employer: Russian Institute of Theatre Arts

Elena Kovalskaya (Russian: Елена Ковальская) is a Russian theatre critic, curator, and teacher. She teaches the history of foreign theatre at the Russian Institute of Theatre Arts (GITIS), and directs a master's program there in social theatre. Until she resigned in protest at the 2022 Russian invasion of Ukraine, she was artistic director at the Meyerhold Theatre and Cultural Center (TsIM).

== Life ==
Kovalskaya graduated in theatre science from GITIS in 1998. From 1999 to 2012 she was a reviewer for the magazine Afisha, and from 2006 she curated the Lyubimovka New Playwrights Festival.

From 2012 she and Victor Ryzhakov created an educational project, 'The School of Theater Leader', at the Meyerhold Center. In 2013 she was appointed art director at the Meyerhold Center. At the start of 2019 Kovalskaya was interviewed about her hopes and fears for the arts in 2019. She looked forward to the official Year of Theater in Russia, and the coming of the Theatre Olympics to Saint Petersburg. "It looks like the government is trying to tame the obstinate theater with carrots and sticks."

In 2020 Kovalskaya became director of the Meyerhold Center.

When the Russian military invaded Ukraine in February 2022, Kovalskaya resigned her position as director of the state-owned Meyerhold Center in protest. She wrote that it was "impossible to work for a murderer and receive salary from him". She was replaced by Serbian director Emir Kusturica.

== Works ==
- Novaja drama : [pʹesy i statʹi ; zamoe zametnoe javlenie na sovremennoj russkoj scene. (tr. "New Drama; the most notable statement on the modern Russian stage") Saint Peterburg: Seans, 2008.
