= SERB =

Russian Liberation Movement «SERB» Русское освободительное движение «SERB»
- Abbreviation: SERB
- Leader: Igor Beketov (Gosha Tarasevich)
- Founded: 26 March 2014; 12 years ago
- Ideology: Loyalism; Russian nationalism Russophilia; Anti-liberalism; Anti-Americanism; Anti-globalism
- Political position: Far-right
- Colours: Red; Blue
- Slogan: "Talk less — do more" (Russian: "Меньше говори — больше делай"), "More action — less words" (Russian: "Больше дела — меньше слов"), "We are not tolerant!" (Russian: "Мы не толерантны!")

Party flag

Website
- vk.com/serb_ru

The Russian Liberation Movement «SERB» (Russian: Русское освободительное движение «SERB»; Russkoye osvoboditel'noye dvizheniye «SERB»), formerly known as South East Radical Block (Russian: Юго-восточный радикальный блок; Yugo-vostochnyy radikal'nyy blok) is a radical Russian nationalist political group operating in Russia and Ukraine.

== History ==
The first mentions of a "South-Eastern Block" on social networks date back to March 2014, when the movement's founders announced the group's participation in the storming of the Kharkiv regional administration. Since its creation, the movement has espoused "anti-Maidan" ideology. SERB supports a move towards federalization with Ukraine and was in favor of the Crimean referendum.

The movement criticized the use of military force in Eastern Ukraine, called for a boycott of the May 2014 presidential election and supported the creation of a "South-eastern Ukrainian republic".

At the time of the election, the movement consisted of around 300 direct supporters and a similar number of sympathizers in Dnipro, Zaporizhzhia and Kryvyi Rih. Its main leader was Russian actor Igor Beketov, who operated under the pseudonym Gosha Tarasevich.

At the end of summer 2014, SERB activists moved from Ukraine to Russia, fearing for their safety following the initiation of a criminal case against Tarasevich by the Security Service of Ukraine. According to Tarasevich, the movement continued to operate in Ukraine after his departure.

In the winter of 2014-2015, the movement became involved in domestic Russian political life, fighting against the Russian opposition under the slogan "We will not allow a Russian Maidan". According to its leaders, the SERB movement was entirely financed by its members.

According to Oleg Chursin, a former member of SERB, the movement was supervised by Russian Major Aleksey Okipny, who worked for the Interior Ministry's Counter-Extremism Center and who was spotted by Solidarity activists during some of the movement's actions. Chursin himself was an acting police major at the time of his activities within the SERB movement.

== Activities ==
SERB activists were reportedly involved in:

- The disruption of anti-war and anti-Putin actions in Moscow
- Denouncing anti-Kremlin protesters and initiating police shutdowns of anti-Kremlin rallies and protests
- Launching attacks on activists, politicians and public figures including Alexei Navalny and Yulia Latynina for "insulting Russia, the President and Crimea"
- The destruction of memorials and the removal of a plaque at the site of Boris Nemtsov's assassination
- Disruption of cultural and public events deemed immoral
- Attacks on the Turkish and Ukrainian embassies
- Filling lawsuits against members of the Russian political oppositions and organizers of art events
- Participating as witnesses in trials against anti-Kremlin protesters

== Response by authorities ==
While a number of SERB activists have been detained by Russian police, no formal prosecution took place. Gosha Tarasevich himself was reported to have attacked a policeman during a rally. He was later beaten by unknown individuals in September 2016. Tarashevich and Aleskandr Petrunko, another SERB activist, were sentenced to 7 days of administrative arrest for their attack on Yulia Latynina and the Jock Sturges exhibition in Moscow.

Russian authorities opened a criminal case against SERB on 29 April 2017 for the violation of Article 116 of the Russian Criminal Code (beatings or other violent acts causing physical pain) after unknown individuals attacked politician Alexei Navalny during which brilliant green, a non-toxic dye, was thrown in his eyes (see Zelyonka attack).

Four different video recordings of the attack were shown on the REN TV channel, depicting SERB activists Aleksandr Petrunko and Aleksey Kulakov among the assailants. The case was eventually dropped by government prosecutors, who argued that the assailants could not be definitively identified from the videos.
