= Biysultan Khamzaev =

Russian politician

- Бийсултан Хамзаев
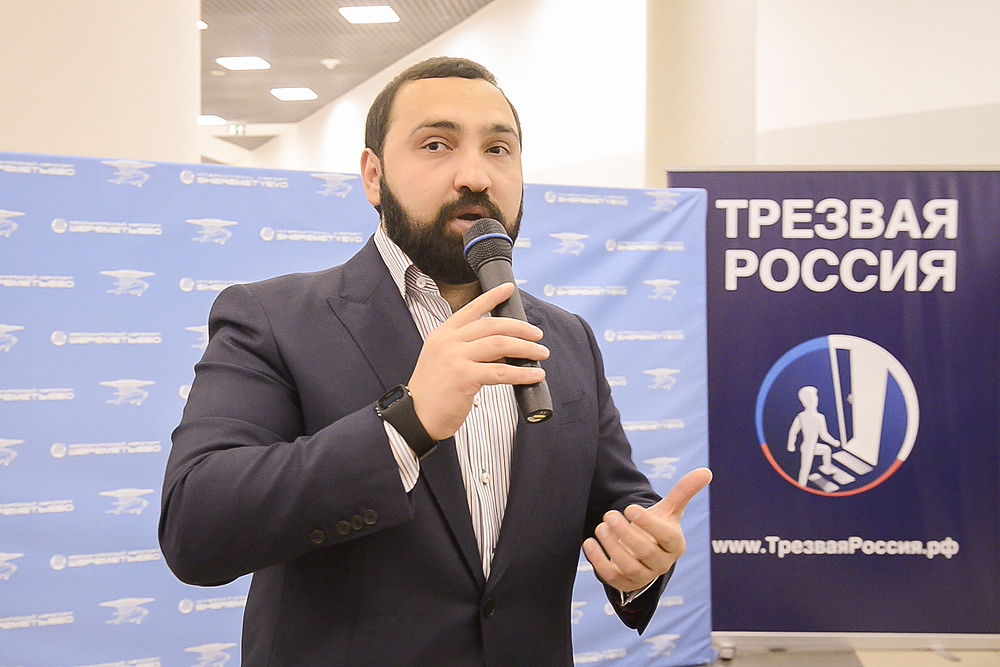

Deputy of the 8th State Duma
- Incumbent
- Assumed office 19 September 2021

Personal details
- Born: 24 May 1982 (age 44) Khasavyurt, Dagestan Autonomous Soviet Socialist Republic, USSR
- Party: United Russia
- Education: Academy of Labour and Social Relations

Biysultan Khamzayev (Russian: Бийсултан Султанбиевич Хамзаев; born 24 May 1982, Khasavyurt, Dagestan Autonomous Soviet Socialist Republic) is a Russian political figure and deputy of the 8th State Duma.

In 2012, Khamzayev initiated and created the project "Sober Russia" that aimed to popularize a healthy lifestyle and fight alcohol, drug, and tobacco addictions. From 2014 to 2021, he was a member of the Civic Chamber of the Russian Federation of the 5th, 6th, and 7th convocations. In 2014–2017, he was the First Deputy Chairman of the Commission of the Civic Chamber of the Russian Federation for Support of Youth Initiatives. Since September 2021, Khamzayev has served as a deputy of the 8th State Duma from the Dagestan constituency.

Khamzayev advocates for prohibiting selling alcohol during the weekends, tightening penalties for counterfeiting alcohol, introducing the death penalty for pedophiles, repeat offenders and murderers, and prohibiting selling tobacco to people born after 2014.

== Sanctions ==
Khamzayev was sanctioned by the UK government in 2022 in relation to the Russo-Ukrainian War. On 24 March 2022, he was sanctioned by the United States Treasury.
