= Free Yakutia Foundation =

Free Yakutia Foundation (Russian: Фонд «Свободная Якутия») is a civil society organization founded in early 2022 in response to Russia’s full-scale invasion of Ukraine. It positions itself as an anti-war Indigenous movement advocating for the rights of the Sakha people (also known as Yakuts), the preservation of their language and culture, and the demilitarization of the Republic of Sakha (Yakutia), a vast region in Russia’s Siberia and Far East.

== History ==
The Foundation was established by a group of Sakha activists in exile, with Sargylana Kondakova, a native of the republic residing in Australia, playing a prominent role in its formation. In February 2022, she published online statements addressed to residents of Sakha opposing Russia’s invasion of Ukraine. These messages attracted attention both within the republic and among the Sakha diaspora. The initiative subsequently developed into an organized movement with a growing network of participants and supporters inside and outside Sakha.

=== Anti-Mobilization Activism ===
One of the Free Yakutia’s main goals is to resist Russia’s military mobilization efforts, which disproportionately affect Indigenous populations. During the first wave of mobilization in September 2022, an estimated 8,000 men were conscripted from Sakha, a republic with a population under one million. Among those drafted, hundreds were later confirmed killed. Free Yakutia has provided legal, psychological, and logistical support to people refusing conscription, helping many escape military service and flee to neighboring countries such as Kazakhstan, Mongolia, and Kyrgyzstan.

=== "Terrorists" Designation in Russia ===
In late December 2024, Russia’s Supreme Court classified the Free Nations of Post-Russia Forum as a terrorist organization and officially listed over 170 affiliate groups, including the Free Yakutia Foundation, as its "structural subdivisions." This action marked a significant escalation of state repression, as the authorities justified the designation by alleging indirect links between the Foundation and forum advocacy for regional autonomy despite denials of any formal connection from the groups involved. Human rights advocates and indigenous activists have criticized the move, calling it a sweeping tactic to silence dissent and constrain independent civic movements among Russia's ethnic republics.
