= Yelena Osipova (Russian activist) =

Russian artist and political activist

- Елена Андреевна Осипова
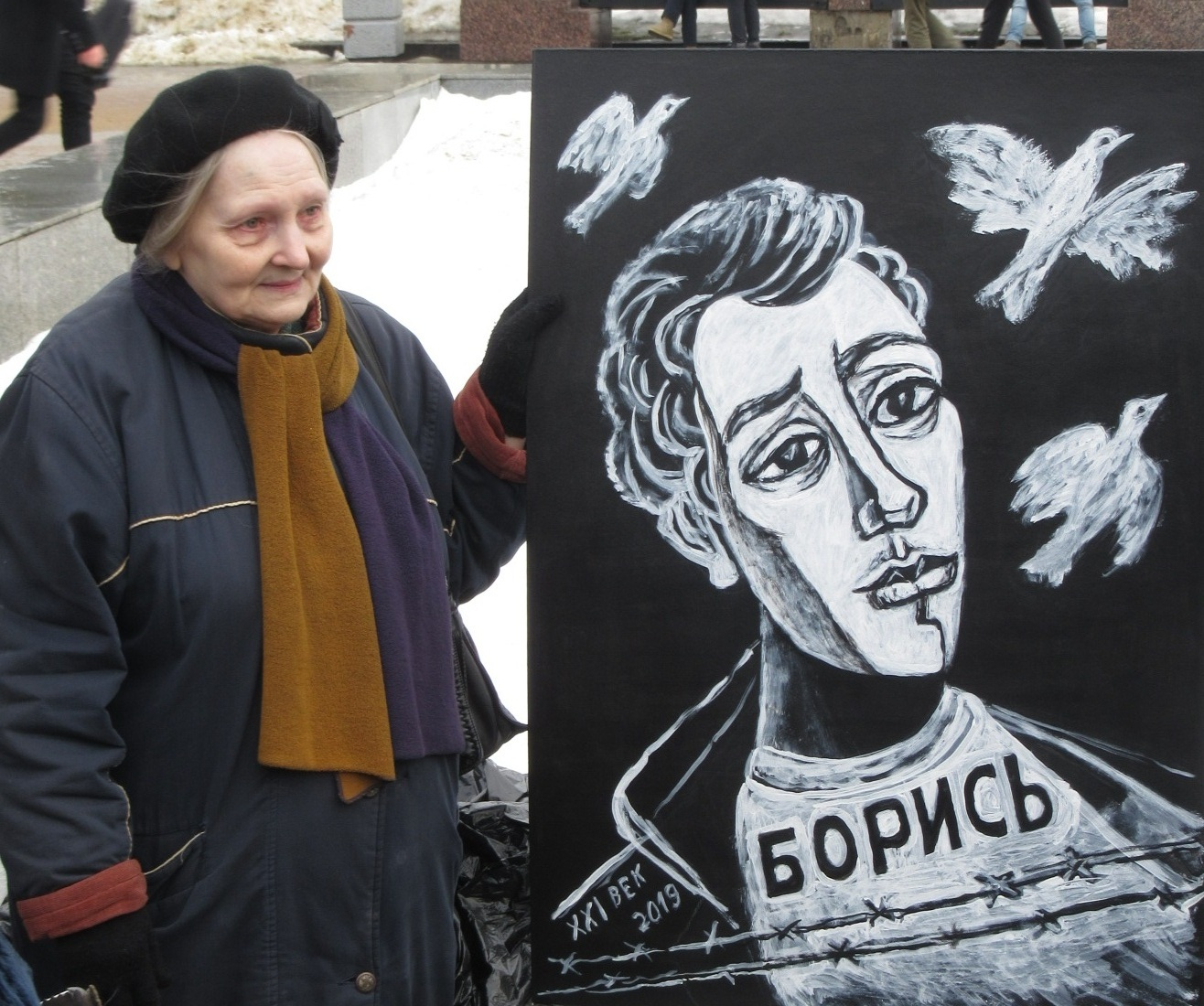
- Osipova at Nemtsov memorial meeting, 2019
- Born: 11 November 1945 (age 80); Leningrad, Russian SFSR, Soviet Union
- Education: Tavricheskaya Art School

Yelena Andreyevna Osipova (Russian: Елена Андреевна Осипова; born November 11, 1945) is an artist and political activist from Saint Petersburg. She became known for her active civic stance — she draws placards on topical political issues and expresses her support for all victims of violence and state repression. Her distinctive artistic style is close to the primitivism and originates in Andrei Rublev's and Dionisy's frescoes.

== Biography ==
Yelena Andreyevna Osipova was born on November 11, 1945, in Leningrad (now Saint Petersburg). Her mother was a veteran of the World War II, a senior sergeant in the medical service, a chevalier of the medal "For Combat Merit". Her father is a radiologist. Yelena's parents met at the war front. Her mother was discharged from the army due to pregnancy, she worked as an accountant at a bread factory in Leningrad, while her father left for the war with Japan and came to see his daughter only once afterwards.

Osipova's parents survived the Siege of Leningrad, but her grandfather died from hunger. Her grandmother had previously worked as a security guard in the Russian Museum. Osipova studied at the Tavricheskaya Art School.

In 1962, at the second attempt, she enrolled in the pedagogical department of Tavricheskaya Art School. Her diploma work was completed in 1965-1967 and dedicated to Tovstonogov Bolshoi Drama Theater which she had been fond of since her youth, however, the committee considered her painting "redolent" and "too surreal". Later she made four unsuccessful attempts to continue artistic education and tried to enroll in Repin Imperial Academy of Arts and Saint Petersburg Stieglitz State Academy of Art and Design.

In 1967, she started working as an art teacher in a village school in Vaganovo. Later she transferred to Metallostroy, after some time she got to work at an evening art school in Saint Petersburg. She also worked for ten years in an art studio at the Yusupov Palace, which she considers to be her most fruitful years as a painter. She retired in 2009.

Osipova was married to Gennady Harvardt, who died prematurely during a trip to Sweden. Their mutual son Ivan (1981-2009) worked as a stagehand for the Lensovet Theater, the Komissarzhevskaya Theater, and the Baltic House. He died in 2009 at the age of 28 of tuberculosis, a consequence of drug abuse.

As of 2023, Osipova lives alone in a communal apartment on Furshtatskaya Street, where the second room is used as a storage for paintings. She receives a pension of 6,000 a month, due to which she no longer receives fines after street arrests, as she has nothing to pay them from. She refuses to sell her own work, including political posters, or accept monetary aid, lest she be seen as selling her beliefs.

== Social activism ==
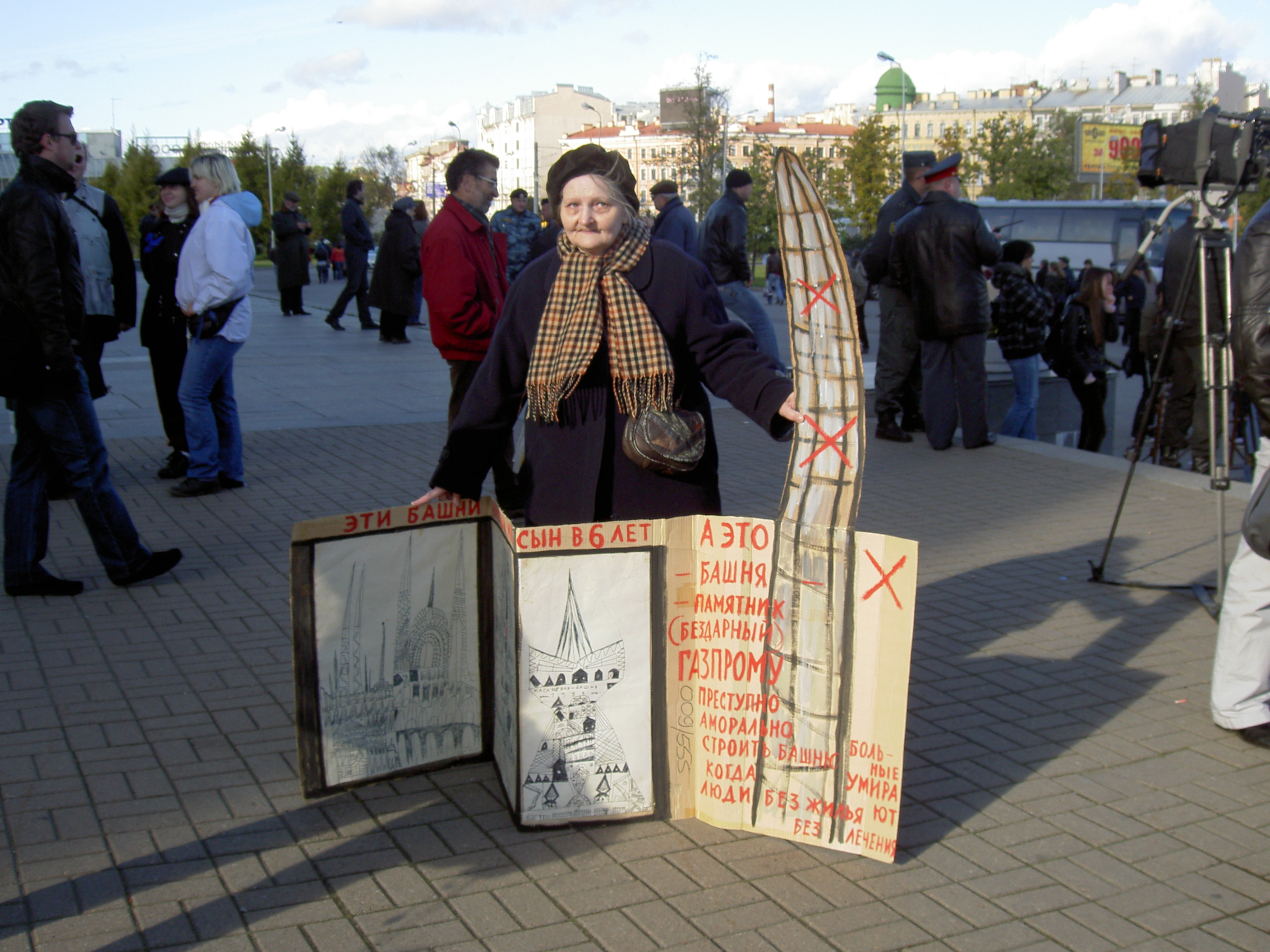
Protesting again construction at Okhta Center, 2009

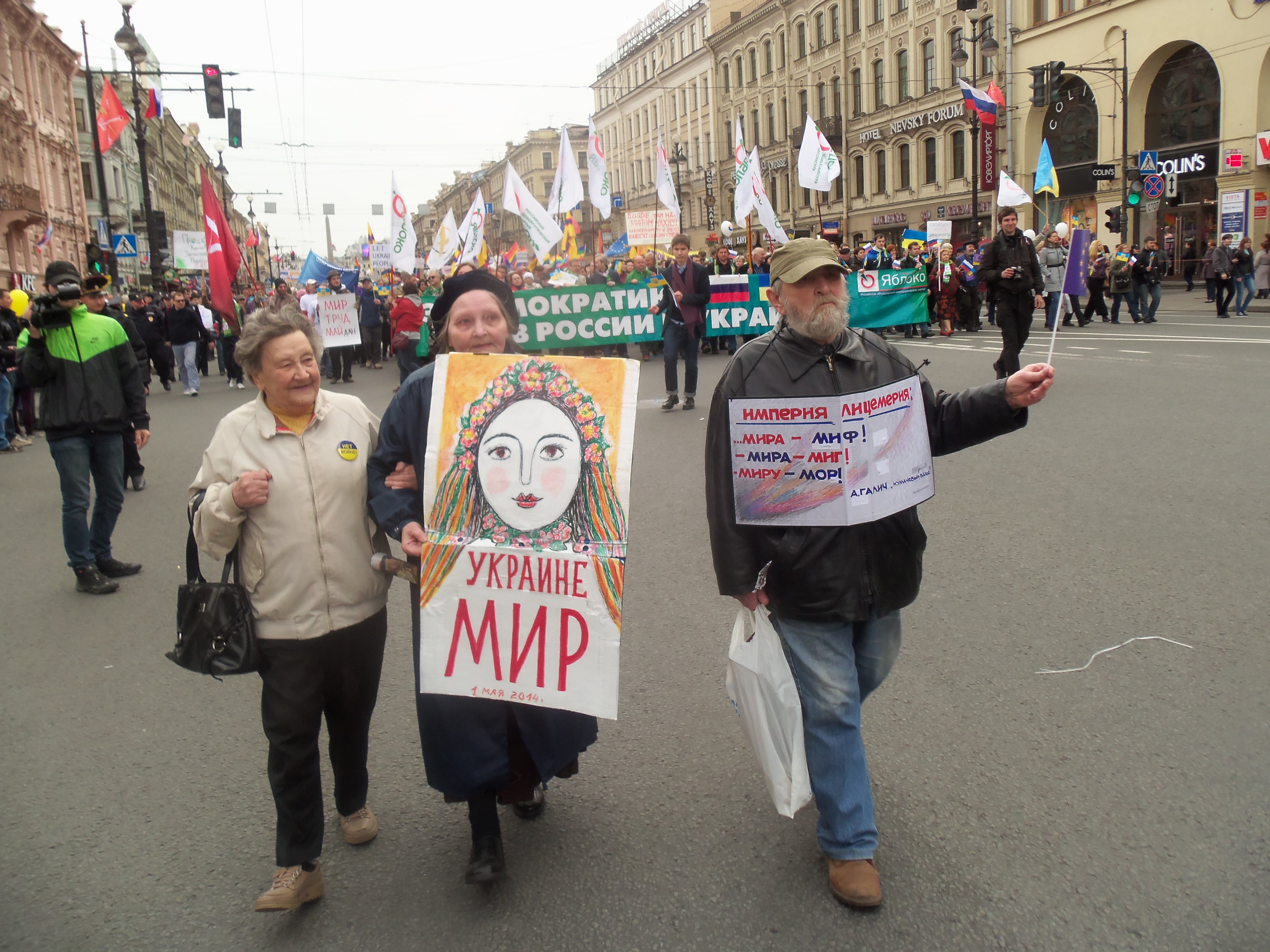
Antiwar Democratic March in Saint Petersburg on 1 May 2014

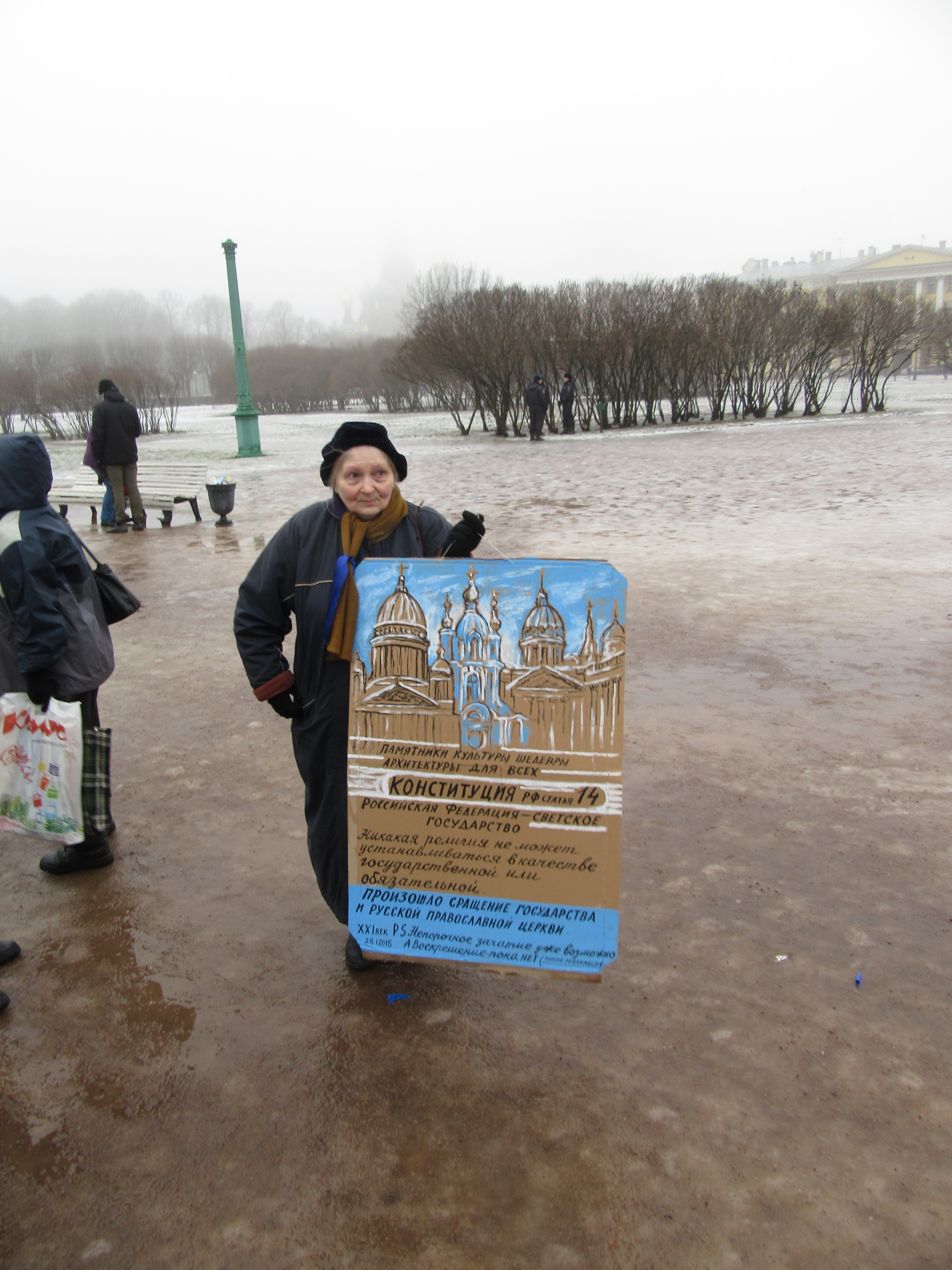
Rally against cession of St Isaac Cathedral to The Russian Orthodox Church, 2017

The first time she made a political poster of her own work was in 2002, during the second Chechen war and after the terrorist attack on Dubrovka. Writing the phrase "Mister President, urgently change course!" on a piece of paper, Osipova marched with the poster to the Saint Petersburg Legislative Assembly in the Mariinsky Palace on Isaac's Square. Her protest went unnoticed at the time. Since then, however, she has taken to the streets with new posters constantly, and her activities have become visible to residents as well as police officers.

Osipova is known for participation in virtually all protest rallies with placards denouncing injustice and crime, warning of danger, and sympathizing with someone's distress, be it natural disasters or violations of political freedoms. She tried to attract public attention to Beslan school siege, Iraq War, November 2015 Paris attacks, Bolotnaya Square case, Annexation of Crimea by the Russian Federation, War in Donbas. She honoured memory of Boris Nemtsov. For some time, she was detained at every rally, but then brought home by the police officers. For her active civic stance, the artist has come to be referred to as "The Conscience of Saint Petersburg".

On April 18, 2017, when she protested against wars in Ukraine and Syria, she was offended and aggressively shouted at by the mob. Passersby tried to tear up her posters, called the old woman a "Navalny scum" and her picket a "Jewish Masonic provocation," and shouted: "Shame on you, you're ruining our party!", "Let us kill her!", "If you don't like Russia - get out of here!"

=== After 2022 Russian invasion of Ukraine ===
On 2 March 2022, Osipova was amongst those arrested in Saint Petersburg for protesting against the Russian invasion of Ukraine. Footage of her arrest was widely shared on social media. On 24 March 2022, she told the BBC's Russia Editor, Steve Rosenberg, that "after Russia attacked Ukraine, she was so shocked, she didn't eat for three days. Then, filled with anger, she'd taken to the streets to protest".

On May 9, 2022, Osipova was attacked by two young men who took her anti-war posters and ran away, as she was exiting her home to go to the Immortal Regiment celebrations. After that she grew internationally famous and was granted honorary citizenship of Milan.

On January 31, 2023, Osipova's political placards exhibition opened at the Yabloko party office on Shpalernaya Street in Saint Petersburg, but the very next day the works were confiscated by the police and then sent for psychological and linguistic expertise under a criminal article about "fakes" about the Russian army.

== Style ==
Osipova has a distinctive artistic style, gentle and fluid but also bold and sometimes cartoon-like. Her political placard is characterized by its satirical orientation, a response to "the issues of the day," but artistically it is close to the primitivism and originates in Andrei Rublev's and Dionisy's frescoes. In addition to political works, Osipova's work includes cityscapes, portraits, including portraits of children. Osipova's portraits are similar to those political posters, but differ from them in their greater emphasis on a person's personal history, nature, relationships, and self-perception. The artist's landscapes, often executed in the impressionistic style, are almost always filled with the presence of man, his detachment from everyday life and enjoyment of the beauty of the world around him. The center of all works of this kind is Saint Petersburg, its recognizable views, panoramas and landmarks, the images of which practically transmit to the viewer the general mood of the city.

Osipova's first-ever exhibition of her work took place in 2015 in Saint Petersburg office of Open Russia.

One of her exhibitions was described as "a cozy basement with uncomfortable images". It included one poster, showing a mother with a dead infant. The painting was about a Tajik boy named Umarali Nazarov, who died in Saint Petersburg after being forcibly taken from his mother. In 2019, the album "Standing Artist with Placard," named after a line from a poem by Mikhail Novitsky, was published.

In 2021, an exhibition of Osipova's cityscapes on the theme of Saint Petersburg was held at Anna Akhmatova Literary and Memorial Museum.
