= Yav Art Group =

- Founded: 2014
- Purpose: Street art, political art, cyberpunk
- Location: Saint Petersburg
- Leader: Anastasia Vladychkina

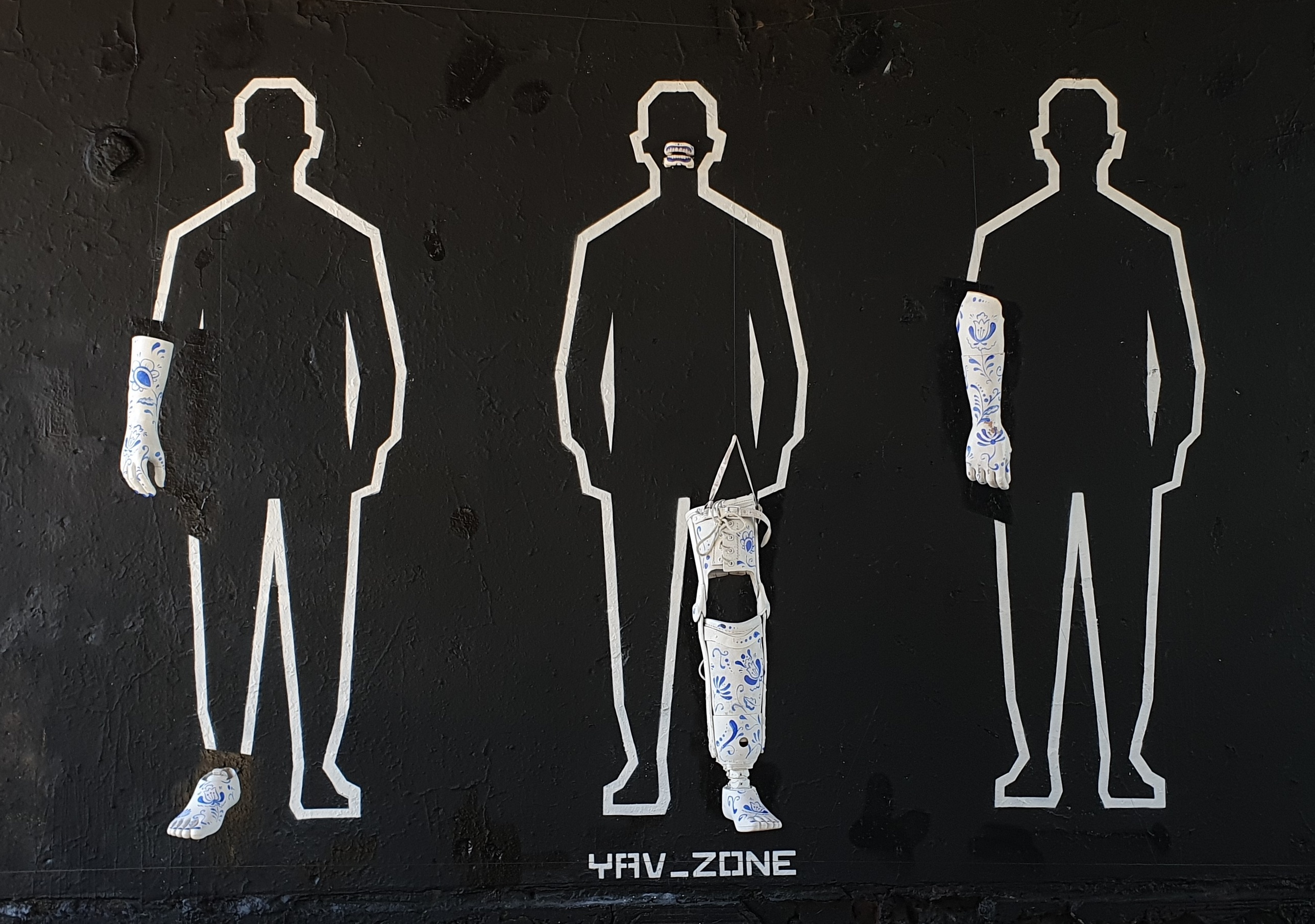
Russian Cyberpunk

Yav Art Group is a Russian street art collective known for its works on the topics of politics, censorship, and social injustice. The group has been active in Saint Petersburg since 2014. The group's members are known for their actions in the genre of street art and installations. The frontwoman of the group is the artist and activist Anastasia Vladychkina.

== History and Activities ==
The Yav art group gained notoriety for its provocative street works, which often touch on sensitive political and social issues. The members of the group strive to express their protest against censorship and human rights violations in Russia through art. In their works, "Yav" actively uses elements of cyberpunk and acute social themes. Since February 24, 2024, the main theme of the works has been the Russian invasion of Ukraine.

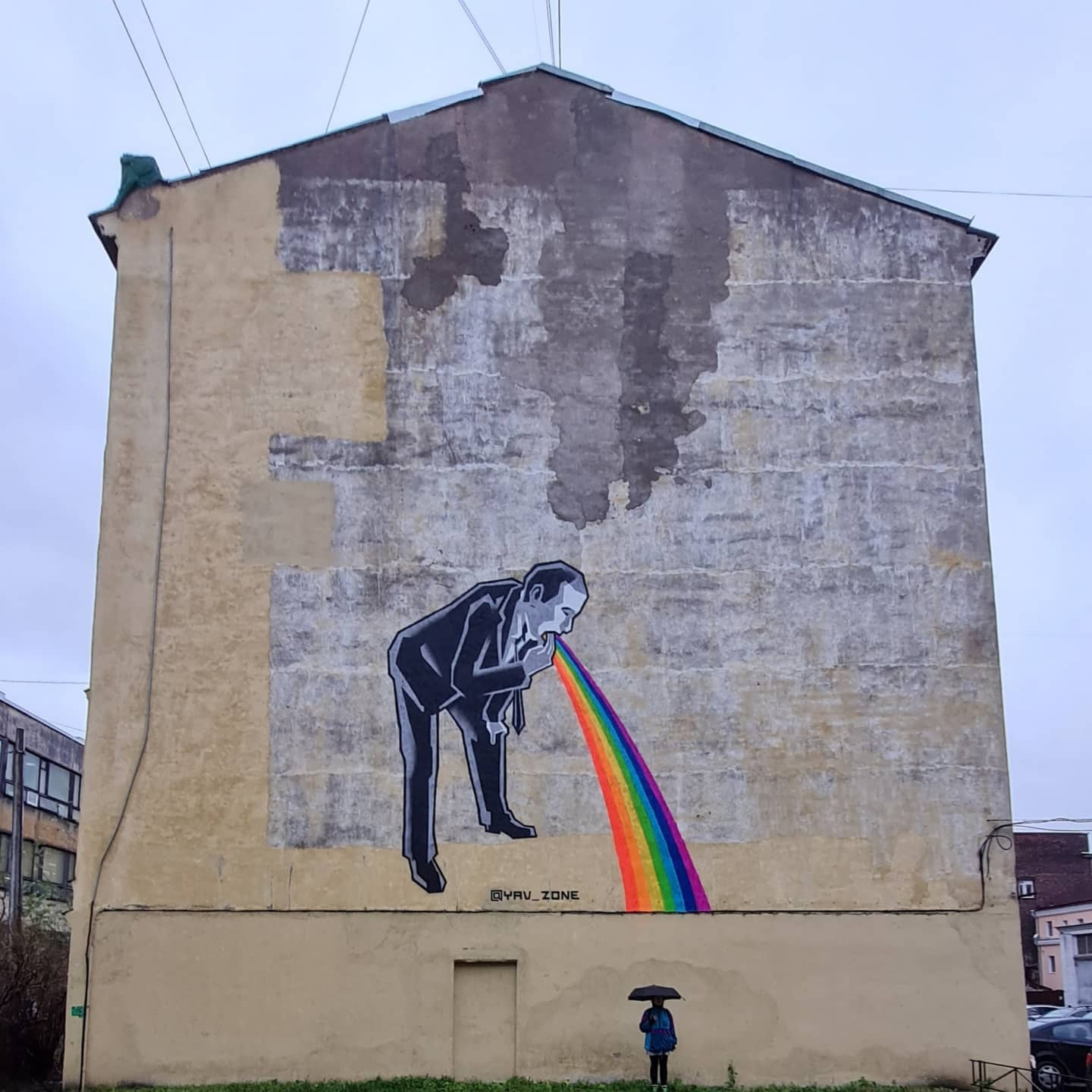
Vomit

== Notable Works and Actions ==
- "Russian cyberpunk" — an installation where prostheses painted to look like Gzhel were attached to the silhouettes of people. The project was quickly dismantled by the authorities after installation.
- "Vomit" — an action implemented on the streets of Moscow. The group's participants placed images of people "spewing" streams of propaganda, thus criticizing the state's information policy and drawing attention to the problems of freedom of speech in Russia.
- "Gulag" — a work dedicated to political repression (graffiti "Goolag. How to get out?" in the style of the main page of Google), partially executed on the street in St. Petersburg. During the creation of the work, the artists were detained by police, but after a short arrest, all were released.
- "Patience" — a street art object depicting the symbol of a dying smartphone battery, which has become a metaphor for the emotional and psychological state of society in Russia. The work was painted over a few hours after its appearance.

== Persecution and Arrests ==
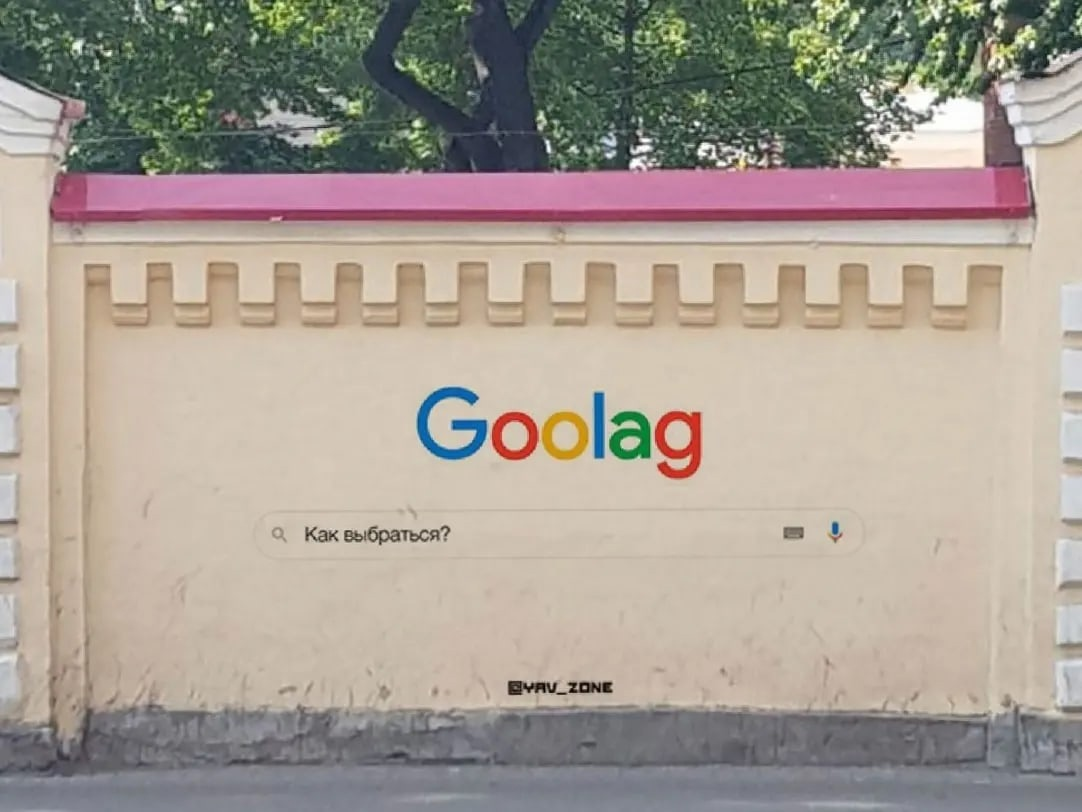
Gulag

Members of the Yav art group are often detained and fined for their work. In August 2022, all members of the group were detained for creating the work "Gulag," but were later released with a fine for petty hooliganism. Despite the pressure, the artists continue to be actively involved in street art and express their views through art.

== Recognition and Awards ==
In 2021, the Yav art group won the "TOP 50. The Most Famous People of St. Petersburg" award in the "Art" category for the work "Patience".

== Personalities ==
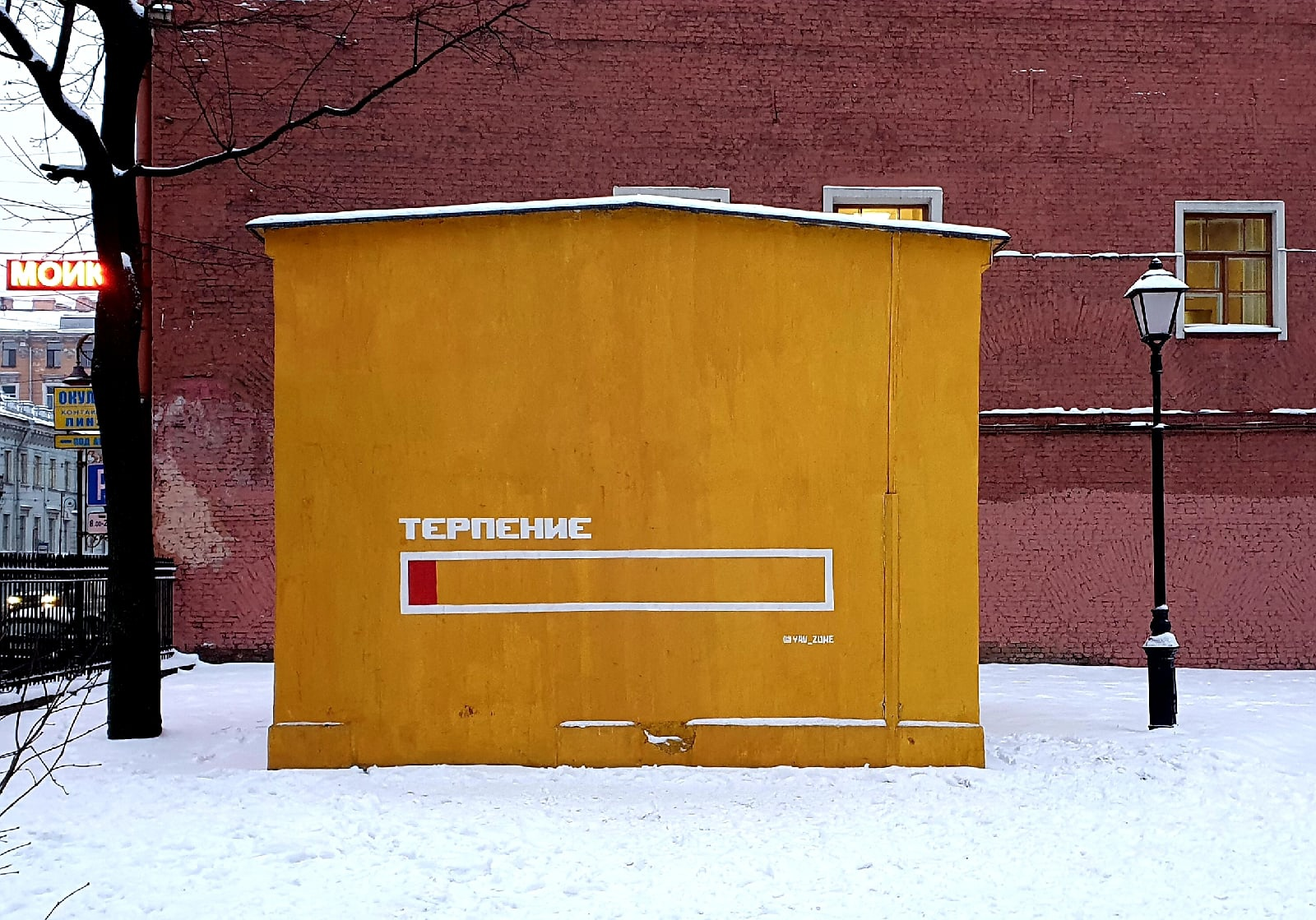
Patience

=== Anastasia Vladychkina ===
Anastasia Vladychkina is the founder and leader of the Yav group, an artist, and an activist. She began to study art in her youth and actively uses street art as a means of expressing protest. In her interviews, Vladychkina emphasizes that her works are not just art, but a way to convey important political and social messages. Anastasia combines elements of activism and modern culture in her work, which makes her one of the most prominent figures in Russian street art.
