= Political activities of Garry Kasparov =

After his retirement from chess in 2005, Garry Kasparov — a former World Chess Champion — turned to politics and created the United Civil Front, a social movement with the stated goal of restoring democracy and the rule of law in Russia. A year later, the movement was absorbed by The Other Russia, an opposition coalition to the United Russia party. In 2007, Kasparov entered the 2008 Russian presidential election, and was nominated as the candidate for The Other Russia, but later withdrew his candidacy.

Kasparov was named Chairman of the Human Rights Foundation in 2011, serving in this position until 2024. In August 2012, he was beaten and arrested on charges of participating in an unauthorized protest; he was later cleared of these charges. Three months later, he fled Russia, citing fears of political persecution. He continued to be an outspoken critic of the Putin administration from exile, including the Russian annexation of Crimea and Russian invasion of Ukraine, and has been vocal about a number of other international conflicts.

== Russia ==
=== Early political activities ===
Kasparov's grandfather was a staunch communist, but the young Kasparov gradually began to have doubts about the Soviet Union's political system at age 13 when he travelled abroad for the first time in 1976 to Paris for a chess tournament. In 1981, at age 18, he read Aleksandr Solzhenitsyn's The Gulag Archipelago, a copy of which he bought while abroad. Nevertheless, Kasparov joined the Communist Party of the Soviet Union (CPSU) in 1984, and was elected to the Central Committee of Komsomol in 1987. In 1990, he left the party. In May 1990, Kasparov took part in the creation of the Democratic Party of Russia. He left the party on 28 April 1991, after its conference. Kasparov was also involved with the creation of the "Choice of Russia" bloc of parties in June 1993. He took part in the election campaign of Boris Yeltsin in 1996. In 2001, he voiced his support for the Russian television channel NTV.

After his retirement from chess in 2005, Kasparov turned to politics and created the United Civil Front, a social movement whose main goal is to "work to preserve electoral democracy in Russia." He has vowed to "restore democracy" to Russia by restoring the rule of law. A year later the United Civil Front became part of The Other Russia. Kasparov was instrumental in setting up this coalition, which opposes Putin's government and the United Russia party. The Other Russia was boycotted by the leaders of Russia's mainstream opposition parties, Yabloko and Union of Right Forces, due to its inclusion of both nationalist and radical groups. Kasparov has criticised these two parties as being secretly under the auspices of the Kremlin.

In April 2005, Kasparov was in Moscow at a promotional event when he was struck over the head with a chessboard he had just signed. Immediately before the attack, the assailant was reported to have said: "I admired you as a chess player, but you gave that up for politics." Kasparov has been the subject of a number of other episodes since, including police brutality and alleged harassment from the Russian secret service.

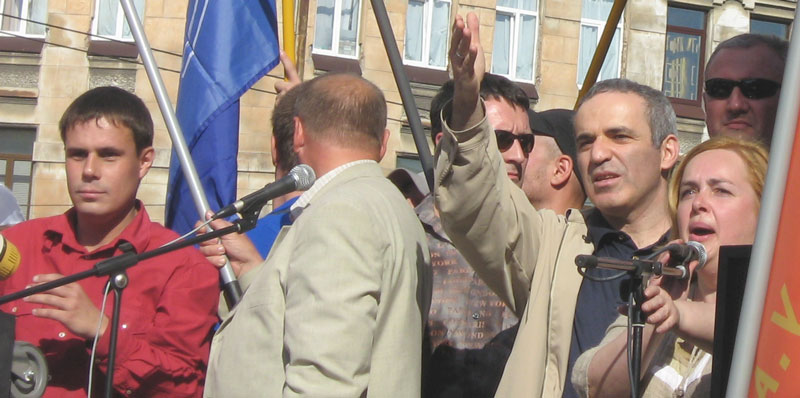
Kasparov at the third Dissenters March in Saint Petersburg on 9 June 2007

Kasparov helped organise the Saint Petersburg Dissenters' March on 3 March 2007 and The March of the Dissenters on 24 March 2007, both involving several thousand people rallying against Putin and Saint Petersburg Governor Valentina Matviyenko. Kasparov led a pro-democracy demonstration in Moscow in April 2007. Soon after it started, however, over 9,000 police descended on the group and seized almost everyone. Kasparov, who was briefly arrested, was warned by the prosecution office on the eve of the march that anyone participating risked being detained. He was held for some ten hours and then fined and released. He was later summoned by the FSB for violations of Russian anti-extremism laws.

Speaking about Kasparov in 2007, former KGB defector Oleg Kalugin remarked: "I do not talk in details – people who knew them are all dead now because they were vocal, they were open. I am quiet. There is only one man who is vocal, and he may be in trouble: world chess champion Kasparov. He has been very outspoken in his attacks on Putin, and I believe that he is probably next on the list."

=== Presidential candidate (2008) ===
On 30 September 2007, Kasparov entered the 2008 Russian presidential election, receiving 379 of 498 votes at a congress held in Moscow by The Other Russia. In October 2007, Kasparov announced his intention of standing for the Russian presidency as the candidate of the "Other Russia" coalition and vowed to fight for a "democratic and just Russia". Later that month he travelled to the United States, where he appeared on several popular television programmes.

In November 2007, Kasparov and other protesters were detained by police at an Other Russia rally in Moscow, which drew 3,000 demonstrators to protest against election rigging. Following an attempt by about 100 protesters to march through police lines to the electoral commission, which had barred Other Russia candidates from parliamentary elections, arrests were made. The Russian authorities stated a rally had been approved but not any marches, resulting in several demonstrators being detained. Kasparov was subsequently charged with resisting arrest and organising an unauthorised protest, and was given a jail sentence of five days. Kasparov appealed the charges, citing that he had been following orders given by the police. He was released from jail on 29 November. Putin castigated Kasparov at the rally for his use of English when speaking rather than Russian.

In December 2007, Kasparov announced that he had to withdraw his presidential candidacy due to inability to rent a meeting hall where at least 500 of his supporters could assemble. With the deadline expiring on that date, he explained it was impossible for him to run. Russian election laws required sufficient meeting hall space for assembling supporters. Kasparov's spokeswoman accused the government of using pressure to deter anyone from renting a hall for the gathering and said that the electoral commission had rejected a proposal that would have allowed for smaller gathering sizes rather than one large gathering at a meeting hall.

=== Opposition to Putin administration (2010–2013) ===
Kasparov was among the 34 first signatories and a key organiser of the online anti-Putin campaign "Putin Must Go", started on 10 March 2010. Within the text is a call to Russian law enforcement to ignore Putin's orders. By June 2011, there were 90,000 signatures. While the identity of the petition author remained anonymous, there was wide speculation that it was indeed Kasparov. On 31 January 2012, Kasparov hosted a meeting of opposition leaders planning a mass march on 4 February 2012, the third major opposition rally held since the disputed State Duma elections of December 2011. Among other opposition leaders attending were Alexei Navalny and Yevgeniya Chirikova.

Kasparov was arrested and beaten outside a Moscow court on 17 August 2012 while attending sentencing in the case involving the all-female punk band Pussy Riot. On 24 August, he was cleared of charges that he had taken part in an unauthorised protest against the conviction of three members of the band. Judge Yekaterina Veklich said there were "no grounds to believe the testimony of the police." Kasparov later thanked all the bloggers and reporters who provided video evidence that contradicted the testimony of the police. Kasparov wrote in February 2013 that "fascism has come to Russia. ...Project Putin, just like the old Project Hitler, is but the fruit of a conspiracy by the ruling elite. Fascist rule was never the result of the free will of the people. It was always the fruit of a conspiracy by the ruling elites"!

Kasparov denied rumours in April 2013 that he was planning to leave Russia for good. "I found these rumors to be deeply saddening and, moreover, surprising", he wrote. "I was unable to respond immediately because I was in such a state of shock that such an incredibly inaccurate statement, the likes of which is constantly distributed by the Kremlin's propagandists, came this time from Ilya Yashin, a fellow member of the Opposition Coordination Council (KSO) and my former colleague from the Solidarity movement." He also accused prominent Russian journalist Vladimir Posner of failing to stand up to Putin and to earlier Russian and Soviet leaders.

However, Kasparov subsequently fled Russia less than three months later. On 6 June 2013, he announced that he had left his homeland on account of fear of persecution for his political views. Further, at the 2013 Women in the World conference, Kasparov told The Daily Beast's Michael Moynihan that democracy no longer existed in what he called Russia's "dictatorship".

=== Opposition to Putin from exile (2013–) ===
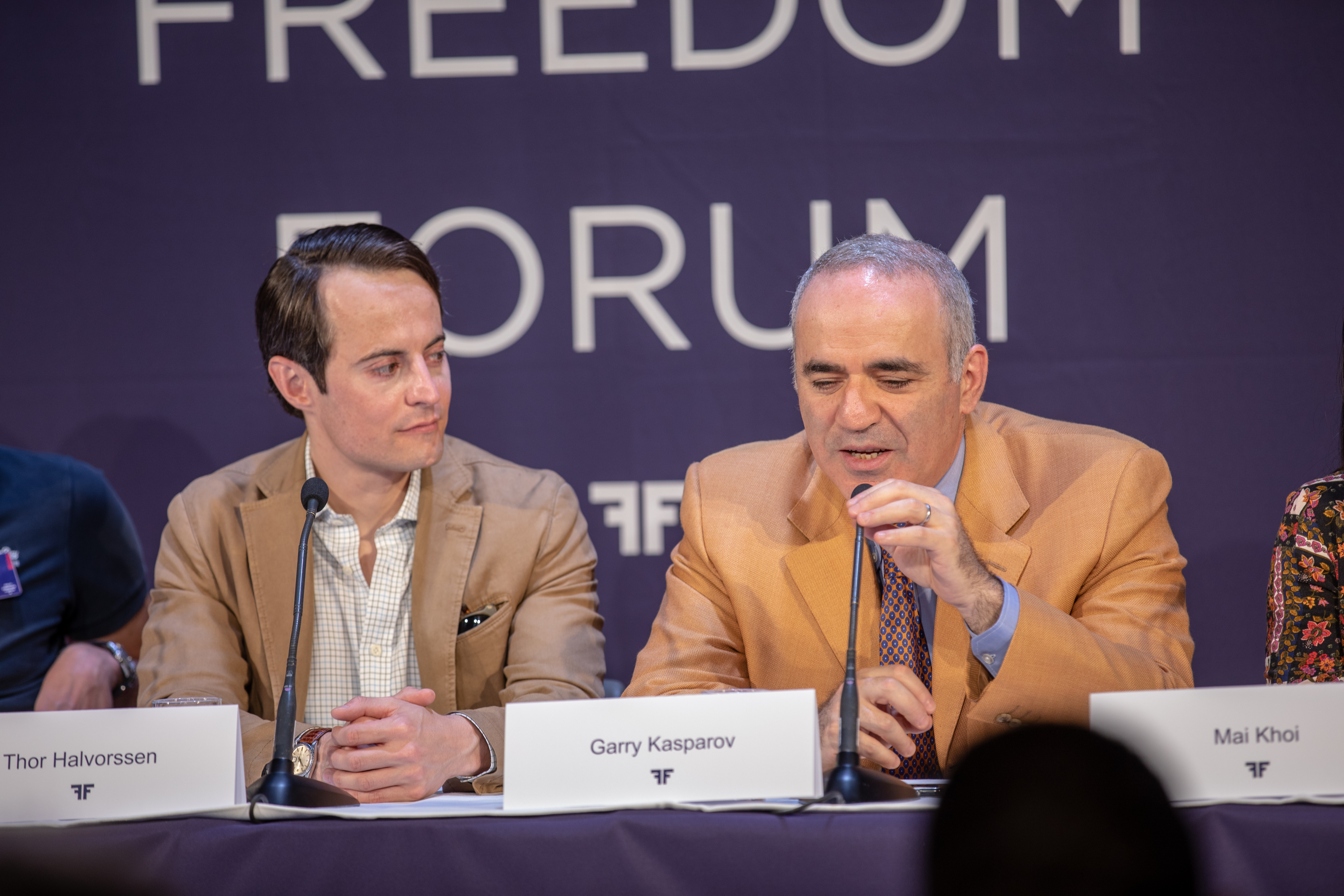
Kasparov at the 2018 Oslo Freedom Forum

Kasparov said at a press conference in June 2013 that if he returned to Russia, he doubted he would be allowed to leave again, given Putin's ongoing crackdown on dissenters. "So for the time being", he said: "I refrain from returning to Russia." He explained shortly thereafter in an article for The Daily Beast that this had not been intended as "a declaration of leaving my home country, permanently or otherwise", but merely an expression of "the dark reality of the situation in Russia today, where nearly half the members of the opposition's Coordinating Council are under criminal investigation on concocted charges." He noted that the Moscow prosecutor's office was "opening an investigation that would limit my ability to travel", making it impossible for him to fulfil "professional speaking engagements" and hindering his "work for the non-profit Kasparov Chess Foundation, which has centres in New York City, Brussels and Johannesburg, to promote chess in education."

Kasparov further wrote that the mass protests in Moscow 18 months earlier against fraudulent Russian elections had been "a proud moment for me". He recalled that after joining the opposition movement in March 2005, he had been criticised for seeking to unite "every anti-Putin element in the country to march together regardless of ideology". Therefore, the sight of "hundreds of flags representing every group from liberals to nationalists all marching together for 'Russia Without Putin' was the fulfillment of a dream." Yet most Russians, he lamented, had continued to "slumber" even as Putin had "taken off the flimsy mask of democracy to reveal himself in full as the would-be KGB dictator he has always been."

Kasparov wrote in July 2013 about the trial in Kirov of fellow opposition leader Navalny, who had been convicted "on concocted embezzlement charges", only to see the prosecutor, surprisingly, ask for his release the next day pending appeal: "The judicial process and the democratic process in Russia are both elaborate mockeries created to distract the citizenry at home and to help Western leaders avoid confronting the awkward fact that Russia has returned to a police state." Still, Kasparov felt that whatever had caused the Kirov prosecutor's about-face, "my optimism tells me it was a positive sign. After more than 13 years of predictable repression under Putin, anything different is good."

Kasparov has been outspoken regarding Putin's antigay laws, describing them as "only the most recent encroachment on the freedom of speech and association of Russia's citizens", which the international community had largely ignored. Regarding Russia's hosting of the 2014 Winter Olympics, Kasparov explained in August 2013 that he had opposed Russia's bid from the outset, since it would "allow Vladimir Putin's cronies to embezzle hundreds of millions of dollars" and "lend prestige to Putin's authoritarian regime." Kasparov did not support the proposed Sochi Olympics boycott—writing that it would "unfairly punish athletes"—but called for athletes and others to "transform Putin's self-congratulatory pet project into a spotlight that exposes his authoritarian rule" to the world. In September, Kasparov called upon politicians to refuse to attend the games and the public to pressure sponsors and the media, such that Coca-Cola, for example, could put "a rainbow flag on each Coca-Cola can" and NBC could "do interviews with Russian gay activists or with Russian political activists." Kasparov also emphasised that although he was "still a Russian citizen", he had "good reason to be concerned about my ability to leave Russia if I returned to Moscow."

Kasparov spoke out against the 2014 Russian annexation of Crimea and has stated that control of Crimea should be returned to Ukraine after the overthrow of Putin without additional conditions. Kasparov's website was blocked by the Russian government censorship agency, Roskomnadzor, at the behest of the public prosecutor, allegedly due to Kasparov's opinions on the annexation of Crimea. Kasparov's block was made in unison with several other notable Russian sites that were accused of inciting public outrage. Reportedly, several of the blocked sites received an affidavit noting their violations. However, Kasparov stated that his site had received no such notice of violations after its block. In 2015, a whole note on Kasparov was removed from a Russian language encyclopaedia of greatest Soviet players after an intervention from "senior leadership".

In October 2015, Kasparov published a book titled Winter Is Coming: Why Vladimir Putin and the Enemies of the Free World Must Be Stopped. In the book, Kasparov likens Putin to Adolf Hitler and explains the need for the West to oppose Putin sooner, rather than appeasing him and postponing the eventual confrontation. According to his publisher, "Kasparov wants this book out fast, in a way that has potential to influence the discussion during the primary season." In 2018, he said that "anything is better than Putin because that eliminates the probability of a nuclear war. Putin is insane." Following reports of Russian ransomware attacks against American agencies and companies in 2021, Kasparov stated that "the only language that Putin understands is power, and his power is his money", arguing that the United States should target the bank accounts of Russian oligarchs to force Russia to rein in its criminals' cyberattacks.

Kasparov spoke out against the invasion of Ukraine by Russia on Twitter: "The only way this really ends is the fall of Putin's regime by collapse of Russian economy and defeat in Ukraine." He also believed that "pressure must be kept up" in terms of sanctions and condemnations against Russia's actions and joined with other prominent Russian figures-in-exile to form the Anti-War Committee of Russia. He said that Russia should be "thrown back into the Stone Age to make sure that the oil and gas industry and any other sensitive industries that are vital for survival of the regime cannot function without Western technological support." On 20 May 2022, Kasparov was designated as "foreign agent" by the Ministry of Justice of the Russian Federation.

In May 2023, along with a large group of fellow exiles, Kasparov participated in the drafting of Mikhail Khodorkovsky's "Declaration of Russia's Democratic Forces". On 4 August 2023, Kasparov participated in the radio show Open to Debate. In a debate with Charles Kupchan, he argued for Ukrainian admission into NATO and against any form of appeasement towards Putin.

In March 2024, Russia placed Kasparov on its list of "terrorists and extremists". On 24 April 2024 an arrest warrant was issued by a court in Russia's Komi region charging Kasparov with creating and leading a "terrorist" group.

In 2026, Kasparov was selected to be a participant in the PACE Platform for Dialogue with Russian Democratic Forces. The platform met in Strasbourg for its first session in January 2026.

== United States ==
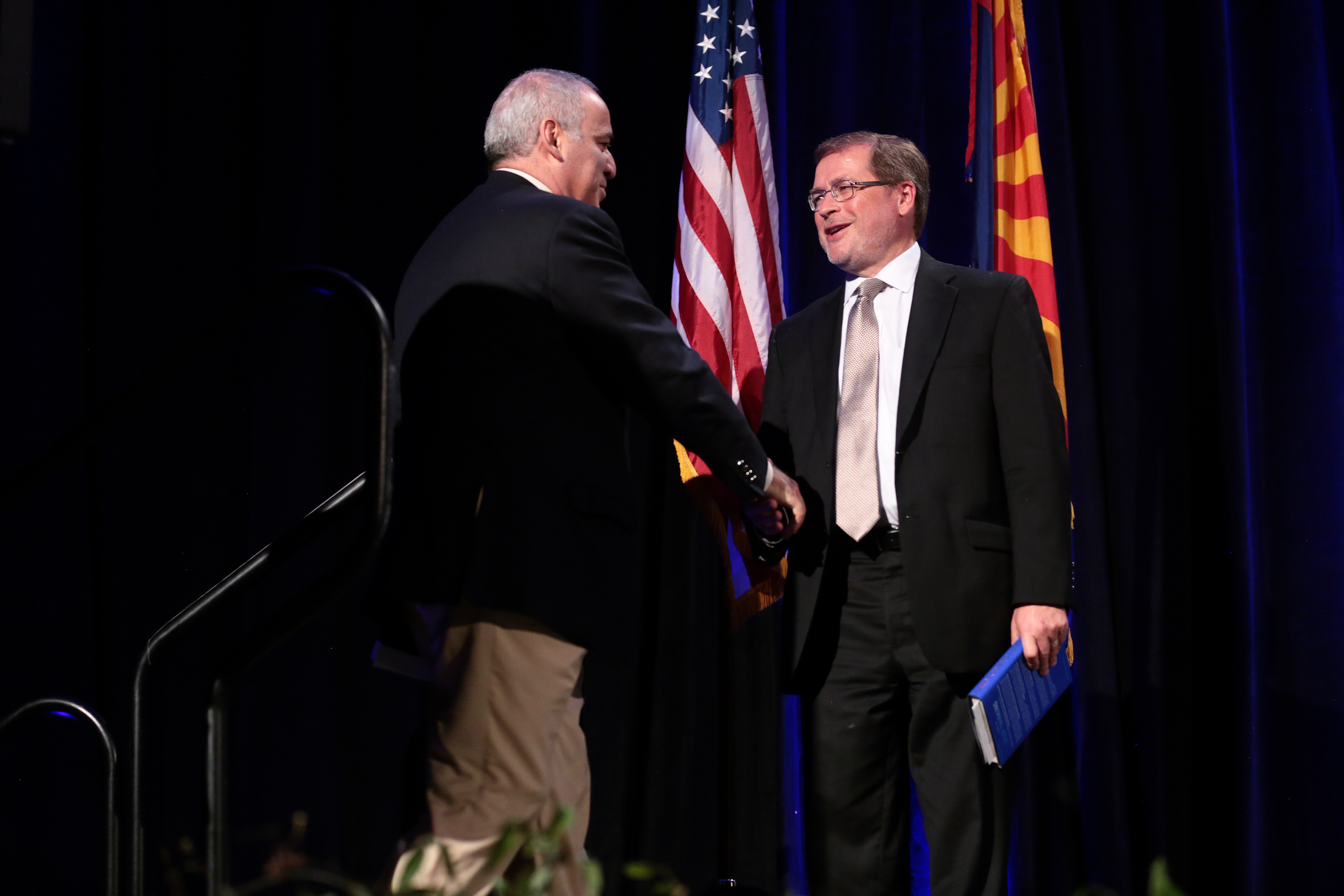
Kasparov and American political activist Grover Norquist in 2017

Kasparov received the Keeper of the Flame award in 1991 from the Center for Security Policy, a Washington, D.C.-based far-right, anti-Muslim think tank. In his acceptance speech, Kasparov lauded the defeat of communism while also urging the United States to give no financial assistance to central Soviet leaders. Kasparov gave speeches at other think tanks such as the Hoover Institution.

In a 12 May 2013 op-ed for The Wall Street Journal, Kasparov questioned reports that the Russian security agency, the FSB, had fully cooperated with the FBI in the matter of the Boston bombers. He noted that the elder bomber, Tamerlan Tsarnaev, had reportedly met in Russia with two known jihadists who "were killed in Dagestan by the Russian military just days before Tamerlan left Russia for the U.S.". Kasparov argued, "If no intelligence was sent from Moscow to Washington" about this meeting, "all this talk of FSB cooperation cannot be taken seriously." He further observed, "This would not be the first time Russian security forces seemed strangely impotent in the face of an impending terror attack", pointing out that in both the 2002 Moscow theater hostage crisis and the 2004 Beslan school siege, "there were FSB informants in both terror groups – yet the attacks went ahead unimpeded." Given this history, he wrote, "it is impossible to overlook that the Boston bombing took place just days after the U.S. Magnitsky List was published, creating the first serious external threat to the Putin power structure by penalising Russian officials complicit in human-rights crimes." In sum, Putin's "dubious record on counterterrorism and its continued support of terror sponsors Iran and Syria mean only one thing: common ground zero."

In the 2016 United States presidential election, Kasparov described Republican Donald Trump as "a celebrity showman with racist leanings and authoritarian tendencies" and criticised him for calling for closer ties with Putin. After Trump's running mate, Mike Pence, called Putin a strong leader, Kasparov said that Putin is a strong leader "in the same way arsenic is a strong drink". He also disparaged the economic policies of Democratic primary candidate Bernie Sanders, but showed respect for Sanders as "a charismatic speaker and a passionate believer in his cause". Kasparov opined that Henry Kissinger "was selling the Trump Administration on the idea of a mirror of 1972 [Richard Nixon's visit to China], except, instead of a Sino-U.S. alliance against the U.S.S.R., this would be a Russian-American alliance against China." In a 2024 interview, Kasparov expressed concern over Elon Musk potentially running the Department of Government Efficiency: "Musk could be the first oligarch", he stated.

== Armenia ==
In a 2020 interview discussing the Nagorno-Karabakh conflict, Kasparov stated that the Republic of Artsakh has a right to independence and that Azerbaijan has no sovereign right over it. He considers this stance to be objective and without bias, as Soviet law allowed for autonomous republics (such as the Nagorno-Karabakh Autonomous Oblast) to vote for independence separately and were given an equal right for self-determination, a factor he felt often went ignored. Kasparov recalled that he was criticised by Armenians for not taking a strong stance when the Karabakh movement began in 1988, explaining that he was living in Baku with 200,000 other Armenians at the time and did not want to increase tensions. Kasparov and his family later fled Baku in January 1990 to escape pogroms against Armenians. Kasparov has declined invitations back to visit Baku, stating he would only return "if every other Armenian born there can do it without a problem and without special favors from the government." He welcomed the Velvet Revolution in Armenia in 2018. Kasparov supports Armenian genocide recognition.

== Other international affairs ==
During the Yugoslav Wars, Kasparov advocated for the Western world to destroy the Yugoslav People's Army and accused Slobodan Milošević of creating a "siege mentality" to maintain control over Serbia. In 1997, he was awarded the title of "honorary citizen of Bosnia and Herzegovina" for his support of the Bosnian people during the Bosnian War. Kasparov was named Chairman of the Human Rights Foundation in 2011; he served in this position until 2024, being succeeded by Yulia Navalnaya. In addition, Kasparov was presented with the Morris B. Abram Human Rights Award, UN Watch's annual human-rights prize, in 2013. The organisation praised him as "not only one of the world's smartest men" but "also among its bravest".

Before the first Gulf War, Kasparov expressed an unconventional viewpoint, recommending the United States to consider the use of an atomic bomb against Saddam Hussein in Iraq. In 2002, supporting military action against Iraq, he also recommended planning for military action against Iran, Syria and Saudi Arabia.

In April 2013, Kasparov joined in an HRF condemnation of Kanye West for having performed for the leader of Kazakhstan in exchange for a payment of $3 million, saying that West "has entertained a brutal killer and his entourage" and that his fee "came from the loot stolen from the Kazakhstan treasury." Further, in September 2013, Kasparov wrote in Time magazine that in Syria, Putin and Bashar al-Assad "won by forfeit when President Obama, Prime Minister Cameron and the rest of the so-called leaders of the free world walked away from the table." Kasparov lamented the "new game at the negotiating table where Putin and Assad set the rules and will run the show under the protection of the U.N.". Kasparov said in September 2013 that Russia was now a dictatorship. In the same month he told an interviewer that "Obama going to Russia now is dead wrong, morally and politically", because Putin's regime "is behind Assad."

Kasparov was critical of the violence unleashed by the Spanish police against the 2017 independence referendum in Catalonia and accused the Spanish PM Mariano Rajoy of "betraying" the European promise of peace. After the Catalan regional election held later the same year, Kasparov wrote: "Despite unprecedented pressure from Madrid, Catalonian separatists won a majority. Europe must speak and help find a peaceful path toward resolution and avoid more violence." Kasparov recommended that Spain look to how Britain handled the 2014 Scottish independence referendum, adding: "look only at how Turkey and Iraq have treated the separatist Kurds. That cannot be the road for Spain and Catalonia."

On the occasion of the 2015 centennial of the Armenian genocide, Kasparov reflected that in 2002 he had called for Turkey to be admitted to the European Union if Turkey recognised the genocide. He condemned the assassination of Saudi journalist Jamal Khashoggi. In October 2018, Kasparov wrote that President Erdoğan's regime in Turkey "has jailed more journalists than any country in the world and scores of them remain in prison in Turkey. Since 2016, Turkey's intelligence agency has abducted at least 80 people in operations in 18 countries."

The second series of Rise of the Nazis, broadcast by the BBC in February 2022, featured Kasparov's views on the Soviet leader Joseph Stalin. Kasparov stated: "Stalin, ruthless dictator, didn't hesitate to eliminate opposition, didn't hesitate to send millions of people to die. It's recorded that Stalin had very high opinion about the Night of the Long Knives, Hitler's ruthlessness. And, of course, in 1940 Stalin admires Hitler because he succeeded in destroying France and almost bringing up England on her knees. It's a very special love story."

In the wake of the Gaza war, Kasparov vigorously called on the Biden administration for the destruction of Hamas and Hezbollah. He further demanded the US to set up regime change in Russia and Iran.
