= Oborona =

Russian Youth Movement "Oborona" Российское молодёжное движение «Оборона»
- Leader: Council of Oborona
- Founders: Ilya Yashin; Sergey Zhavoronkov; Dmitry Kokorev
- Founded: 12 March 2005
- Dissolved: 4 February 2013
- Preceded by: Union of Right Forces; Yabloko
- Succeeded by: Solidarnost; Vesna (Russia)
- Headquarters: Saint Petersburg
- Ideology: Liberalism; Social liberalism Social democracy Libertarianism
- Political position: Catch-all
- Colours: Black; White

Website
- oborona.org

Russian Youth Movement "Oborona" (Russian: Российское молодёжное движение «Оборона»; Rossiyskoye molodozhnoye dvizheniye «Oborona») (Russian for "Defense") is a non-partisan civic youth movement in Russia. The movement was established in 2005 and has no leader or centralized structure. Instead, it is based on the network principle and mostly horizontal relations.

The movement opposes what they call an authoritarian vector of Russian policy. They claim that president Vladimir Putin destroys democracy institutions and aims to establish an authoritarian police state in Russia. The movement espouses nonviolent resistance to the authorities.

The Moscow branch of Oborona has several hundred activists. The movement also has branches in 25 Russian cities.

The movement has been widely inspired by the Orange Revolution in Ukraine in 2004 and especially the Ukrainian youth organizations Pora! and Znayu! as well as by Belarus Zubr.

One of this organization leaders, Oleg Kozlovsky has been arrested, and, according to several oppositional sites illegally sent as a private conscript to the Russian Army. Eight other members of the movement who tried to arrange demonstrations in support of Kozlovsky have been arrested as well, one of them daughter of writer and radio host Victor Shenderovich. One of arrested was severely beaten and taken to a hospital.

Leadership of "Oborona" believed that Kozlovsky has been arrested for publishing in LiveJournal photos of governmental special forces officers who recently killed activist of Other Russia Yuriy Chervochkin. However Oleg Kozlovsky himself said that he was conscripted in order to isolate him from his colleagues in Oborona for a period of presidential elections. Indeed, he was released from the Army on March 4, 2008, two days after the elections. The military officials confirmed that his draft had been illegal.

== Symbolism ==
The group used the same symbol of clenched fist in a circle as the 1998-2004 Serbian anti-Milošević movement Otpor! Their logo was created by Nenad "Duda" Petrović.

== History ==
In January 2007, Moscow Oborona held meetings with the leader of the United Civil Front, Garry Kasparov, and the chairman of the Federal Political Council of the Union of Right Forces, Nikita Belykh.

On 11 February 2007, the next general meeting of the Moscow Oborona was held, at which the task of preparing a non-violent democratic revolution was proclaimed since, as stated in the statement, regime change through elections had become impossible.

On 18 February 2007, Oborona activists held a direct action against censorship on television. They blocked the approaches to the main entrance of the Ostankino television center, unfurled a banner that read "Stop lying!" and handcuffed themselves to the fence of the television center. They demanded the return of live broadcasting to socio-political programs, the abolition of "black lists" and "temniki" (closed instructions for covering current events in media), and the privatization of all but one TV channel. Four protesters were detained.

On 3 March 2007, Oborona participated in the Dissenters' March in St. Petersburg. With several thousand St. Petersburg residents, Oborona activists marched from the site in front of the Oktyabrsky Concert Hall on Ligovsky Avenue to Dumskaya Square. During the action, nine Oborona members were detained.

On 14–15 April 2007, Oborona activists again participated in the Dissenters' Marches held in Moscow and St. Petersburg. 23 Oborona participants were detained, including four coordinators. Trials of the detainees took place in April and May 2007. St. Petersburg Oborona activist Pavel Yeremeyev was the only protest participant who won the trial and proved his innocence.

On 27 April 2007, Oborona members in St. Petersburg spoke out against censorship on television. They asked passersby to choose the most deceitful TV channel and shoot the TV with the logo of this channel with a paintball gun. Then, the members smashed the televisions with sledgehammers.

On 11 June 2007, Moscow Oborona participated in the next Dissenters' March. They managed to participate without clashes with the police or arrests: the city authorities allowed the "dissenters" to gather on Pushkinskaya Square, but the procession had to be abandoned. Oborona coordinator Oleg Kozlovsky promised that opposition supporters would take the route of their choosing next time.

On 25 July 2007, the creation of a federal structure for the movement was announced. This structure consists of the Oborona Council and the All-Russian Oborona Committee. Before, all regional organizations were autonomous. The creation of interregional structures was justified by the need to coordinate Oborona's actions on the eve of the presidential elections.

On 16 September 2007, Oborona organized an action of solidarity with oppositionists in Belarus. Having begun with a picket authorized by the authorities, the action resulted in an unauthorized march through the streets of Moscow.

On 20 September 2007, Oborona activists hung a 12-meter banner on the Taras Shevchenko embankment in Moscow, opposite the White House, saying, "We don't need vile power!" The action was timed to coincide with the first government meeting under the leadership of the new Prime Minister, Viktor Zubkov. None of the protesters were detained.

On 7 October 2007, Oborona participated in the Dissenters' March organized at the initiative of the Russian People's Democratic Union on the anniversary of the assassination of Anna Politkovskaya and the birthday of Vladimir Putin. Despite the ban on the march, Oborona activists, together with members of the People's Democratic Youth Union, the National Bolshevik Party, and others, marched from Malaya Dmitrovka to house No. 8 on Lesnaya Street, where Politkovskaya lived and was killed. Oborona members carried a "Constitution or Revolution" banner and lit flares.

On 22 October 2007, Oborona activists spoke out against amendments to the law "On the Referendum of the Russian Federation" introduced by United Russia deputies. According to the action participants (they also referred to the point of view of the Constitutional Court and the Legal Department of the State Duma), these amendments violate the right of citizens to a referendum, making it possible to prohibit a plebiscite on almost any issue. Activists of the movement unfurled a banner in front of the main entrance to the State Duma saying, "United Russians are freaks, the referendum is for the people!", lit firecrackers, and scattered leaflets. Three protesters and four journalists were detained; another activist managed to escape.

On 24 November 2007, during a Dissenters' March in Moscow, several dozen Oborona activists were detained. Two of them were sentenced to 5 days of arrest for "failure to comply with the legal demands of police officers."

On 3 December 2007, Oborona announced that it did not recognize the results of the parliamentary elections held the day before. The movement argued that the elections were not democratic, fair, or free. This statement was submitted to the Central Election Commission.

On 20 December 2007, one of the coordinators of the Moscow Oborona, Oleg Kozlovsky, was detained on the street and, on the same day, drafted into the armed forces as a private. He spent two and a half months in the armed forces. Kozlovsky himself and his associates claimed that the purpose of the conscription was to isolate him for the period of the presidential election campaign, and they accused the FSB of organizing the conscription. Kozlovsky was dismissed from the army on 4 March 2008 - two days after the elections and the day after the next Dissenters' March.

== Structure ==
Oborona has a network structure in which each regional organization retains significant autonomy, and horizontal links prevail over vertical ones. The largest regional organizations are managed by coordinating councils, others by coordinators.
