= Solidarnost =

Solidarity Солидарность Solidarnost
- Abbreviation: ODD «Solidarnost» (English); ОДД «Солидарность» (Russian)
- Leader: Federal Political Council
- Founders: Garry Kasparov; Boris Nemtsov; Nikita Belykh; Ilya Yashin; Vladimir Bukovsky; Lev Ponomaryov; Vladimir Milov; Roman Dobrokhotov; Maksim Reznik
- Founded: 12 December 2008; 17 years ago
- Preceded by: Union of Right Forces; United Civil Front; Oborona; The Other Russia
- Succeeded by: People's Freedom Party "For Russia without Lawlessness and Corruption"; Democratic Choice; 5th of December Party; Vesna
- Headquarters: Moscow
- Ideology: Liberalism (Russian); Liberal democracy
- National affiliation: Opposition Coordination Council (2012–2013)
- Colours: Orange; Grey
- Slogan: "Change requires solidarity. Solidarity requires change." (Russian: "Перемены требуют солидарности. Солидарность требует перемен.")
- Anthem: My zhdyom peremen

Party flag

Website
- https://www.rusolidarnost.ru/

United Democratic Movement "Solidarnost" (Russian: Объединённое демократическое движение «Солидарность»; ОДД «Солидарность»; Obyedinonnoye demokraticheskoye dvizheniye «Solidarnost», ODD "Solidarnost"), abbreviated ODD "Solidarnost" (Russian for "Solidarity", named after the Polish Solidarność), is a Russian liberal democratic political movement founded on 13 December 2008 by a number of well-known members of the liberal democratic opposition, including Garry Kasparov, Boris Nemtsov, Lev Ponomaryov and others from the Yabloko and Union of Right Forces (which had just merged with two pro-Kremlin parties, the Democratic Party of Russia and Civilian Power, to form the pro-Kremlin liberal democratic Right Cause) parties, leaders of the Dissenters March events, the Committee 2008, the People's Democratic Union, the United Civil Front, The Other Russia and other politicians and political groups.

In an apparent attempt to weaken the movement immediately before its foundation, President Dmitri Medvedev nominated former leader of the Union of Right Forces Nikita Belykh to become governor of the Kirov Oblast. (Belykh agreed to take the position.) As reported by the International Herald Tribune Belykh "sought to explain his decision by arguing that he could do more good by working with the Kremlin. He said he would prove that someone with progressive ideas could succeed in the government", while saying that "When you have nothing at all, when you cannot even get close in the elections, when all your paths are being cut off, then you just can't have a political party."

== History ==
Previously, attempts to unite the opposition were undertaken by the organizations of the Committee 2008, the United Civil Front, the Other Russia, the National Assembly of the Russian Federation, and many years of attempts to establish a dialogue between the SPS and Russian United Democratic Party "Yabloko".

== Participants ==
Solidarnost movement includes the following forces:

- Anti-war club, unifying protesters against war and torture at the Caucasus
- Former members of the Union of Right Forces
- Free Radicals libertarian movement (Либертарное движение «Свободные радикалы»
- Oborona movement
- Union of solidarity with political prisoners
- "For human rights" movement
- other democratic and human rights organizations.
- United Civil Front led by Garry Kasparov

Regional branches

== See also ==
- Hungarian Solidarity Movement
- Solidarity
