= Putin Must Go =

Russian website and public campaign

- Screenshot
- Website type: Signature collection
- Available in: Russian
- Website: putinavotstavku.org
- Commercial: No
- Launched: 10 March 2010
- Current status: Active: 153,331 people signed up as of 17 August 2019

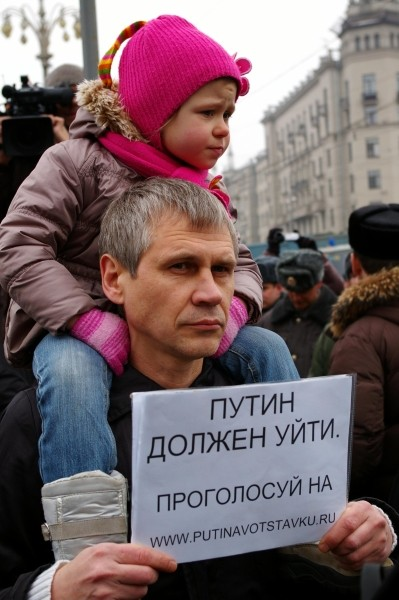
A demonstrator urges to sign the appeal "Putin Must Go". The photo from the banned rally in Moscow on 20 March 2010, called "The Day of Wrath".

"Putin Must Go" (Russian: "Путин должен уйти", romanized: "Putin dolzhen uyti", IPA: [ˈputʲɪn ˈdolʐɨn ʊjˈtʲi]) is a Russian website and public campaign organised for the collection of signatures to an open letter demanding the resignation of Vladimir Putin, who at the time was Prime Minister (currently President). The campaign was started on the Internet on 10 March 2010 by Russian opposition activists, including several Russian artists.

== Contents of the petition ==
The text of the petition, addressed to the "citizens of Russia", contains a sharply negative assessment of Vladimir Putin's activity. It says in part:

We state that the sociopolitical construction that is killing Russia and has now bound the citizens of our country has one architect, one custodian, and one guardian. His name is Vladimir Putin. We declare that no essential reforms can be carried out in Russia today as long as Putin controls real power in the country. [...] Ridding ourselves of Putinism is the first, obligatory step on the path to a new, free Russia.

The petition lists Putin's failed reforms ("everything that could be ruined has been ruined") and alleged crimes, such as the Second Chechen War and the Russian apartment bombings.

The petition also criticises the late president Boris Yeltsin and the circle of his advisers and relatives ("the Family"), who promoted Putin to the presidency in order to guarantee their own security. The petition calls Dmitry Medvedev, the president at the time, "an obedient placeholder", "a modern Simeon Bekbulatovich".

The authors appeal to law enforcement and security agency officers not to stand against their nation and not to carry out criminal orders.

The actual author of the text was not named, but according to early sources it was a group headed by Garry Kasparov. Later Kasparov said about the work on the text of the petition:

A key role was played by the text itself, on which our group of authors worked almost two weeks. My main function was to gather comments and get approvals of the text from all the signatories — from Vladimir Bukovsky to Yury Mukhin. This work required meticulous selection of words and positioning semantic accents. It was not easy to formulate the main message of the petition. At first two variants were examined: "Putin must resign!" and "Down with Putin!". The first variant was brushed away, because it was a clear appeal to Medvedev; the second one smacked of Bolshevism. Two days before the launch of the project I came up with the phrase "Putin must go" (literally, "Putin, to the Exit!"), which suited everybody. Another delicate issue was the characterisation of the 1990s. When expressing negative sentiment toward that period, it was necessary not to overdo it and thus cause rejection from such people as, for example, Boris Nemtsov. Our collaboration turned out to be very successful, because we created a text, with which we managed to overcome the atomisation of society.

The main part of the text was written by Andrei Piontkovsky. He mentioned his authorship during an interview with Radio Liberty on 7 June 2010:

As is known, I was the initiator and the author of the letter "Putin must go".

== Signatories ==
At the time of the publication, the petition was signed by 34 prominent public figures of various ideological orientations: activists Yelena Bonner, Vladimir Bukovsky and Lev Ponomarev, politicians Garry Kasparov and Boris Nemtsov, popular conspiracy theorist Yury Mukhin, economist Andrey Illarionov, writers Zakhar Prilepin and Victor Shenderovich, musician Mikhail Borzykin (Televizor), political thinker Geydar Dzhemal and others. Many of them are members of the opposition organisation, the National Assembly of the Russian Federation.

Opposition politicians Mikhail Kasyanov, Vladimir Ryzhkov and Eduard Limonov have supported the campaign, even though they have not signed the petition.

== Publication of the petition ==
On 10 March 2010 the petition appeared in the online magazine Ezhednevnyi Zhurnal and the collecting of signatures started. On the same day the magazine's website was attacked by hackers. Later on 10 March the collecting of signatures was transferred to the specially created website PutinaVotstavku.ru (in January 2011 it was moved to PutinaVotstavku.org). Also on 10 March the petition was re-published by the online publications Grani.ru and Kasparov.ru. Then it was mentioned by several other liberal mass media, including the radio station Echo Moskvy and the news website Newsru.com.

During the first day of the campaign no e-mail confirmation was required by Ezhednevnyi Zhurnal. The site PutinaVotstavku did require a confirmation, but signatures were added automatically. This was used by ill-wishers, who left a large number of fake signatures, calling themselves Obama, Timoshenko, Medvedev, Putin etc. On 11 March these "signatures" were deleted and the process of adding new signatures began to be moderated.

== Course of the campaign ==
During the first month of the campaign the number of signatures grew at the average rate of about 1000 per day. In late summer the speed of signature collection dropped to about 2000 per month. In December 2010 it increased to about 4000.

- 16 March 2010: 10,000
- 27 March: 20,000
- 9 April: 30,000
- 28 April: 40,000
- 14 June: 50,000
- 1 October: 60,000
- 6 January 2011: 70,000
- 12 March: 70,000
- 6 June: 90,000

On 17 March the United Civil Front started to hold pickets in Moscow in support of the campaign. Since May 2010 several organisers of the campaign have held meetings with supporters in a number of Russian cities. On 23 October, 12 December 2010 and 19 February 2011 rallies were held in central Moscow for Putin's dismissal.

=== March 2010 ===
On 15 March the site PutinaVotstavku started giving updates on the progress of the campaign. The first message said that the number of signatures could have been larger, if confirmations from the site had not been blocked by some popular e-mail services. However, the organisers expressed a belief that no counteraction would stop people and the appeal would be signed by millions of citizens.

Valeria Novodvorskaya's signature was added only a week later, after her two video-addresses to the organisers. In them she expressed her displeasure with the delay and supposed that organisers did want to include her and Konstantin Borovoy's signatures.

Konstantin Borovoy's signature was added only on 5 April. In his blog entry of 16 March the politician attributed this delay to the fact that he and Novodvorskaya were not allowed to join the Solidarity movement. He expressed a hope that it was a misunderstanding and asked Garry Kasparov and Boris Nemtsov to settle the issue with the Solidarity membership.

Starting on 17 March, members of the United Civil Front held pickets in Moscow, some of them in dormitory districts, to collect signatures for the petition.

Paper signatures were also collected during the protest actions on 20 March 2010 (the "Day of Wrath"). In particular, members of Solidarity collected signatures at rallies in Moscow and St. Petersburg.

On 22 March organisers announced the creation of two online communities for those who signed the petition—on LiveJournal (putinvotstavku.livejournal.com) and Twitter (twitter.com/putinavotstavku/). They also proposed to discuss the creation of a separate social network in which every signatory would automatically get an account.

On 26 March, during a press-conference organized by the site's editorial board, Garry Kasparov announced that the petition had been signed by about 30 thousand people—with 19 thousand having been approved by the moderators.

During that March the website developed rapidly with the creation of a campaign banner (with a counter), banners of media partners (Grani.ru, Novaya Gazeta, Kasparov.ru, etc.), links to campaign communities in social networks, as well as a form for filling in signatures offline. The sections News, Publications, Selected (signatures), Video and FAQ were added as well.

=== April 2010 ===
In April the already-created sections of the site were being filled in. Also a Facebook group was added.

On 13 April the signatories received an e-mail message in which the organisers informed them about the creation of a social network. The message contained a web link to receive a newsletter and join the internet community, "Putin must go."

On 28 April the organisers announced that a third of the signatories had confirmed interest in joining the social network. They also discussed the plan to create groups of participants on the site and to also then visit cities in which a certain number of participants were located.

=== May 2010 ===
At the May Day rally in Moscow Garry Kasparov declared that the campaign would go on until Putin leaves and Russia becomes free.

On 12 May the first meeting of signatories took place in Moscow, attended by about 70 people. Several leaders of Solidarnost, including Garry Kasparov, were also present.

Advertising of the site Putinavotstavku using Google was started and account numbers for donations were published on the main page of the site.

=== June 2010 ===
On 14 June Boris Nemtsov and Vladimir Milov presented their report, "Putin. Results. 10 years", which was published with a total print run of 1 million copies. On its last page it provided information about the "Putin must go" campaign. They were distributed the same day near Moscow's metro stations.

On 15 June the website of the report, as well as the personal websites of Boris Nemtsov and Vladimir Milov, were subjected to DDoS attacks.

On 16 June the St. Petersburg police detained a truck with 100,000 copies of the report. On the next day secret service officers seized 100,000 more copies at the printing plant and blocked further printing. On 18 June in St. Petersburg five activists of the United Civil Front were detained, when they attempted to distribute the report to participants of the St. Petersburg International Economic Forum.

On 25 June the authorities reported that extremism in the report had not been found, but activists could not get the report back, because the power of attorney had expired.

The UCF held "Putin must go" pickets in Moscow on 8 and 22 June. During the picket on 22 June activists handed out texts of both the "Putin must go" petition and the "Putin. Results. 10 years" report. According to the head of the UCF Moscow branch, Lolita Tsaria, policemen tried to impede the distribution of materials.

The website "No to the mandarin", created with the support of the "Putin must go" campaign, appeared on the Internet. It contains signatures of citizens against the appointment of the Kaliningrad regional governor Georgy Boos for a second term and for general elections of governors and heads of municipalities.

=== July 2010 ===
On 5 July it became known that Pavel Pakhayev, assistant head of the Altai Republic, threatened to murder the founder of an Altai newspaper Listok Sergei Mikhailov, because of the content of the newspaper and the fact that the counter of the campaign "Putin must go" had been placed on the newspaper website.

On 6 July 100,000 brochures of the report "Putin. Results. 10 years" (out of the 300,000 that were seized) were returned to the opposition. On 8 July Boris Nemtsov presented the report in the town of Vladimir.

On 11 July in Novosibirsk, on 12 July in Tomsk and on 28 July in Nizhny Novgorod meetings took place of supporters of the campaign "Putin must go" with the executive director of the Solidarity movement Denis Bilunov.

A new subsection "Blogs" (in the section "Publications") appeared on the site of the campaign.

=== August 2010 ===
In August the distribution of the report "Putin. Results. 10 Years" continued. About 1/3 of the published 400,000 copies were distributed by the end of the month.

=== September 2010 ===
On 7 and 21 September United Civil Front held pickets in Moscow for Putin's dismissal.

=== October 2010 ===
15 October activists of the youth movement Oborona held a banner "Putin, go away!" on the fence of the White House in Moscow and on the roof of an auxiliary building next to it.

==== Committee of Five Demands and the rally of 23 October ====
In the beginning of October activists of UCF, Solidarity and other opposition organisations created the Committee of Five Demands. The committee put forward the following demands:

1. Resignation of the government headed by Vladimir Putin.
2. Dissolution of the two chambers of the Federal Assembly.
3. Holding pre-term elections, free and competitive.
4. A radical overhaul of the police and secret service personnel.
5. A transparent budget for the benefit of the people and development of the country.

Members of the committee took part in several protest actions in Moscow. They also submitted an application to Moscow mayor's office for holding a rally for Putin's dismissal. Their application was approved.

The rally, held on 23 October on Pushkin square, was attended by about thousand people. Among the speakers were the UCF leader Garry Kasparov, the Left Front coordinator Sergei Udaltsov, leader of the movement "For Human Rights" Lev Ponomarev and others.

=== November 2010 ===
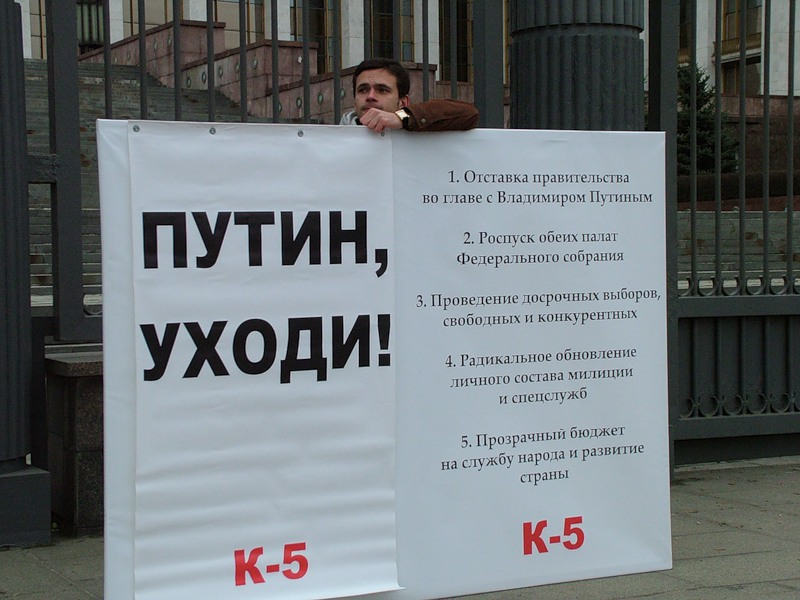
The picket by Ilya Yashin in front of the White House in Moscow on 18 November 2010

18–19 November in front of the White House in Moscow a series of single pickets was held by activists of Solidarity and the Committee of Five Demands. The first picket was held by Ilya Yashin, but he was beaten and detained by agents of the Federal Protective Service. Journalists were obliged to delete their photo and video recordings. Yashin was sentenced to a fine of 1000 roubles for "coarse language in a public place". Other pickets went without incidents.

=== December 2010 ===
==== The rally of 12 December ====
The second Moscow rally for Putin's resignation was held under the motto "I am for Russia without Putin!" on 12 December on the same place – Pushkin square.

The mayor's office sanctioned this rally but refused to sanction the action "Day of Wrath" against the Moscow government, which was to be held on a neighbouring square immediately after the anti-Putin rally.

The organiser was again the Committee of Five Demands. According to various sources, the rally was attended by 1500 – 2500 people. Among the speakers were Boris Nemtsov, Garry Kasparov, Ilya Yashin, Andrei Piontkovsky, Vladimir Ryzhkov, Sergei Udaltsov, leader of the Khimki forest defence movement Yevgenia Chirikova and other prominent public figures.

At 6 pm the action "Day of Wrath" was to be held near the Moscow mayor's office. However, after an appeal of the Left Front coordinator Sergei Udaltsov to the participants to go without slogans and banners to the mayor's office in order to hang on its wall the list of demands, the police started to push away the crowd and seized Udaltsov. Among the aggrieved was a photographer of Izvestia, whose clavicle was broken. The indignant participants went to the mayor's house on their own, where they held an unsanctioned protest action.

Udaltsov was sentenced to 15 days of arrest "for hooliganism and disobedience to police officers".

The next rally for Putin's dismissal was planned for 19 February 2011.

==== Other events ====
On 18 December in Voronezh a rally was held for the dismissal of Putin's government. Among the speakers was a leader of Solidarity Ilya Yashin.

On 26 December, a few days before passing a new sentence to the imprisoned Mikhail Khodorkovsky and Platon Lebedev, activists of Oborona unrolled near the White House a banner "Freedom to Khodorkovsky! Put Putin on bread and water!". One of the participants bore Putin's mask and was held in a mock cage. After a few minutes agents of Federal Protective Service detained several journalists and photo correspondents.

=== January 2011 ===
On 11 January 2011 the website was completely moved to the domain .org. On the start page of the old address the organisers published a message, containing a link to the new address. In the message they state that at the new address they are going to open a web community for the supporters.

=== February 2011 ===
==== The rallies of 19 February ====
The Moscow authorities approved the application of the Committee of Five Demands to hold a rally "I'm for Russia without Putin!" on 19 February on Pushkin Square in Moscow.

On 18 February three activists handing out leaflets with an invitation to the rally were detained; the reasons for their detention were not explained.

The Moscow rally was attended by 400–600 people. Among them were representatives of "Solidarity", the United Civil Front, the Left Front, the "Other Russia" and other opposition movements. The decline in attendance compared with previous rallies was partly due to a severe frost.

Among the speakers were the leader of the United Civil Front Garry Kasparov, activists of the Solidarity movement, as well as a representative of the movement of defrauded real estate investors. Over 13,000 roubles were collected in favour of political prisoners. The date of next rally was not announced.

At the same time a similar rally was held in Kaliningrad. It was organised by self-nominated candidates who had not been admitted to the March elections.

A picket for Putin's dismissal was also held in Voronezh.

==== Other events ====
In February a beta version of the Political network of direct electronic democracy was launched on the website. The information about the network was sent to the signatories in Moscow and the Krasnodar Territory.

On 20 February activists of the movement "We" stretched a banner with the slogan "It's time to change" on a bridge near the Kremlin. On the one side the banner depicted Mikhail Khodorkovsky, on the other – Vladimir Putin behind bars. After a half an hour the banner was removed by guards of the Baltschug hotel.

=== March 2011 ===
On 11 March, the first anniversary of the start of the campaign, the organizers sent a new message to all signatories informing about the opening of the direct electronic democracy network and urging them to join.

On 26 March 2011 the Solidarity movement held an event to coincide with the 11th anniversary of the election of Vladimir Putin as president of the country. The activists handed out ballots with the question to people whether they would vote for or against Vladimir Putin. Polls were held in Moscow and 10 other cities. In total 1,563 people participated and 76.6 percent of them voted against the prime minister. In addition, the activists handed out the report "Putin. Results. 10 years", while in Moscow they also held a contest of anti-Putin posters.

== Political network of direct electronic democracy ==
The creation of an online community (social network) of signatories was suggested by the organisers early in the campaign – in their messages in March and April 2010. However, the project has been launched with a significant delay due to a number of technological challenges and its volunteer nature.

The network has been created at https://web.archive.org/web/20110827152258/http://sos.putinavotstavku.org/. Its testing began in late December 2010. In February information about a beta version was distributed to the signatories living in Moscow and the Krasnodar Territory.

On 11 March 2011 information about the creation of the network was sent to all signatories. Within one day, about 1700 people registered for the network. Then registration of new members slowed down. In April, only 48 people joined the network, and by May 2011 the network had 2,098 participants.

Well-known opposition politicians, such as Garry Kasparov, Boris Nemtsov and Ilya Yashin, began to publish records from their blogs. Participants also post messages in thematic communities, their own blogs, and take part in polls. However, the activity in the network remains low.

According to sociologist Igor Eidman, who has proposed the idea of the network, the project remains unfinished. Eidman wonders what prevents the organisers (and specifically, the group led by Kasparov) to develop the project in accordance with the specifications which he has provided. In case of lack of funds, Eidman proposes to organize fundraising from the signatories.

== Media coverage ==
The campaign was covered in a number of Russian and foreign media, including

- Russian media: Echo Moskvy, Novaya gazeta, Polit.ru, Izvestia, Nezavisimaya Gazeta, Pravda, Delovoy Petersburg, Sobesednik, Expert, The Moscow Times
- foreign media: BBC (UK); Radio Liberty, The Weekly Standard (U.S.); Deutsche Welle, Frankfurter Rundschau (Germany); AFP, Courrier International (France); First Caucasian (Georgia); Svenska Dagbladet (Sweden); Ekstra Bladet, Dagbladet Information (Denmark); Adevarul (Romania); Libertópolis (Guatemala); L'Occidentale (Italy).

On 11 March Radio Liberty published an English translation of the entire text of the petition.

== Statistical analyses of signatories ==
On 15 March 2010 the magazine NewTimes.ru published a statistical analysis of signatories according to their places of residence and professions, concluding that the petition was signed mostly by the middle class.

On 22 March the magazine published its second analysis, on a larger base of signatures (7500). The article said that signatures had come from all over the country. The exceptions were ethnic republics, especially in the North Caucasus. The most active were Moscow 28.8% and St. Petersburg 11.3%. A relatively large number of signatures had been provided by residents of Siberian and Urals federal districts, where the recession-hit industries concentrated. The Russian diaspora had given 11%. As to signatories' professions, the leading segment are white collars (jurists, economists, IT-specialist, managers) — 21%. Most of the signatories were men — 83%.

Two months later the magazine published the third analysis, which used 35,018 signatures received on the site since the second analysis. Significant changes in statistics were found. In April compared with March, the number of those who revealed their places of residence had doubled. The proportion of women increased from 17% to 21% and the proportion of blue-collar workers increased from 15% to 23%. Among the regions, Moscow (and its region) and St. Petersburg (with the Leningrad region) continued to occupy leading positions: their share was nearly half (45%) of the total number of signatures. However, the fastest growing was the Volga Federal District, showing an increase of 6.9 times.

== Counter-campaign "Putin must not go" ==
Russian writer and opinion journalist Nikolai Starikov organized a vote on the Internet with a plea that Putin must stay. He motivated his move with the suggestion that everybody must have a choice, while the website "Putin must go" did not provide an option to vote for Putin's staying. Starikov's website "Putin must not go" gathered 6,616 signatures in five days (1,648 more could not be confirmed because of technical troubles). After that, that website was hacked and defaced by unknown hackers.

== See also ==
- Opposition to Vladimir Putin in Russia
