= Freedom Nation =

Freedom Nation Нация свободы
- Spokesperson: Roman Popkov; Dmitry Bakhur
- Founded: 7 September 2009
- Dissolved: 2012
- Split from: National Bolshevik Party
- Headquarters: Moscow
- Ideology: Russian nationalism National democracy National liberalism Social nationalism Civic nationalism
- Political position: Syncretic
- National affiliation: The Other Russia
- Colours: Red; Black
- Slogan: "Resistance is everything, the rest is nothing!" (Russian: "Сопротивление - всё, остальное - ничто!")

Party flag

Website
- freedomnation.ru

The Freedom Nation (Russian: Нация свободы; Natsiya svobody) was a Russian social and political movement. Its creation was announced in September 2009.

The movement was formed by a group of former supporters of Eduard Limonov, who left his community, as «they came to the conclusion that the political course chosen by Limonov and his entourage was not a road to victory».

In addition to the main group in Moscow, there are branches in Yaroslavl and Sergiyev Posad.

The Freedom Nation was formally a member of The Other Russia coalition (at present this coalition has ceased to exist, although it has not been officially dissolved), several members of the movement are members of the National Assembly of the Russian Federation.

== Ideology ==
The ideology of the Freedom Nation is a socially oriented national democracy.

In the national question Freedom Nation relies on enlightened nationalism, on the priority of self-awareness over origin («Russian is a person who considers Russian as his language, Russian history as his history, ready to shed his own and other people's blood, defending Russia»)

The concept of "nation" is interpreted by the ideologists of the movement as "a set of people united by a common historical will, who feel themselves as a link in the chain of generations and understand the extent of responsibility - both to their ancestors, and to their descendants, and to their contemporaries."

In terms of the state structure, the Freedom Nation advocates the reform of the administrative division of Russia, the elimination of the national republics and the creation of an equal federation of "Krais endowed with broad powers. In the future, it is planned to form "a system of self-government based on network technologies (...) The functions of the renewed state will be limited to solving the issues of external security of the Nation, as well as investing in large-scale construction and science-intensive projects."

The movement proclaims the territorial integrity of Russia as one of the priorities.

"Exchanges", "concessions", "carve-up with neighbors" are unambiguously inadmissible. The borders of Russia can only change in one direction - towards the expansion of the territory.— Нация Свободы: Самое необходимое The movement requires the maximum realization of democratic freedoms (freedom of movement, speech, assembly, public associations) while minimizing state control over public life.

Freedom Nation stands for "equal access of all citizens to information, universal free education and the possession of individual weapons", since these factors will exclude "the possibility of social inequality."

Movement advocates for the introduction of a progressive scale of taxation, government subsidies for housing and communal services and transport, for a comprehensive reform of the judicial and law enforcement systems, for the formation of a professional army.The program of the movement pays special attention to the need to overcome the technological backwardness of Russia.

«Alternative energy, environmentally friendly technologies, high-speed transport, construction of new types of cities, ecovillages, aquatauns - all this (...) will turn the uninhabited expanses of our vast Motherland into the most attractive land on the planet.»

== Symbolics ==
The traffic banner is a rectangular red cloth cut in the center with a white wedge. In the center of the wedge there is a stylized black rocket. The rocket symbolizes "the progressiveness of our undertakings, striving for the future, energy and perseverance, unswerving striving for the goal - a great and free Russia. The rocket is a symbol of the intellectual, scientific and technical potential of the Nation, which was almost destroyed during the years of the rule of Yeltsin's temporary workers and Putin's oil and gas oligarchy. Potential, which we will certainly revive, since without it the survival of Russia in the terrible 21st century is unthinkable. The rocket is also a symbol of the power of the Nation of the future, a symbol of a threat to those who dare to encroach on our freedom"

== Political actions ==
On September 21, 2009, the first public action took place with the participation of the newly formed movement. Activists of the movements Freedom Nation, Oborona and Smena conducted a campaign raid on the Moscow Metro.

On October 19, 2009, activists of the movement hung a poster on the fence of the Chinese Embassy in Moscow "Our resources are great and abundant, but there are no brains in the Kremlin!", And also "shared" symbolic "last shirts". It was a protest against the Russian-Chinese agreement on the joint development of the natural resources of the Far East.

On October 21, 2009, activists of the movement Vladimir Titov and Dmitry Konstantinov symbolically "closed" the building of the Moscow City Duma with the help of bicycle locks in protest against violations during the election of deputies of the city parliament. The protesters were arrested for three days.

On November 29, 2009, activists of the Freedom Nation, Smena and Oborona movements carried out a campaign raid on suburban electric trains. The topic of the event is the problem of law enforcement agencies and ways to solve it.

On January 25, 2010, activists of the Freedom Nation hung posters in front of the building of the Ministry of Internal Affairs "Nurgaliev - to resign", "Stop killing people", "Stop contract cases" and "Freedom for political prisoners".

On March 2, 2010, the Freedom Nation held a similar action in front of the Ministry of Sports, Tourism and Youth Policy, placing posters "Mutko, go away!" On nearby houses and "Ate the country - f$ed up the Olympics" (the action was dedicated to the unsuccessful performance of the Russian team at the Winter Olympics in Vancouver).

On April 25, May 30 and September 12, 2010, Freedom Nation participated in rallies against tax increases and the state economic dictatorship organized by the Libertarian Party and the National Democratic Alliance.
