= Russian People's Democratic Union =

Russian People's Democratic Union Российский народно-демократический союз
- Abbreviation: RNDS (English); РНДС (Russian)
- Leader: Mikhail Kasyanov
- Founded: July 1, 2006
- Dissolved: June 16, 2012
- Merger of: Democratic Party of Russia; Yabloko; Union of Right Forces; Our Choice
- Merged into: RPR–PARNAS
- Headquarters: Moscow
- Youth wing: People's Democratic Youth Union
- Ideology: Liberalism
- Political position: Centre to centre-right
- National affiliation: The Other Russia (2006-2007)
- European affiliation: Alliance of Liberals and Democrats for Europe Party (2008-2012)
- Colours: White; Red

Party flag

Website
- http://nardemsoyuz.ru/

The Russian People's Democratic Union (RNDS; Russian: Российский народно-демократический союз; РНДС; Rossiyskiy narodno-demokraticheskiy soyuz, RNDS), initially named as People for Democracy and Justice (NDS; Russian: Народ за демократию и справедливость; НДС; Narod za demokratiyu i spravedlivost, NDS) was a liberal opposition political party in Russia, founded in 2006. The party was a member of the opposition coalition The Other Russia and was founded by former Prime Minister Mikhail Kasyanov after he failed to win the leadership of the Democratic Party of Russia. The Union was one of the founding parties of the People's Freedom Party, in which the RNDS merged into in 2012.

== History ==
RNDS was created at a congress in Moscow on 8 April 2006, drawing delegates from the Union of Right Forces, Yabloko and Irina Khakamada’s “Our Choice” movement. The Ministry of Justice repeatedly declined to register the party, prompting Kasyanov to re-brand the project several times under names such as “People for Democracy and Justice.” Unable to contest elections, RNDS became a founding member of the opposition coalition The Other Russia and helped organise the Dissenters' Marches in 2006–07, rallies that were repeatedly broken up by police. The U.S. State Department’s 2008 human-rights report documented arrests of RNDS activists during these protests, including that of a regional organiser Aleksandr Bragin.

=== 2008 presidential campaign ===
At a party congress on 23 July 2007 RNDS formally nominated Kasyanov as its candidate for the 2 March 2008 presidential election. After collecting the required two million signatures, he filed his paperwork in January 2008, but the Central Election Commission ruled that a significant share of the endorsements were invalid and removed him from the ballot. The Supreme Court later rejected Kasyanov’s appeal against the exclusion.

=== People's Freedom Party ===
In September 2010 RNDS opened negotiations with the pro-democracy movement Solidarnost and other liberal groups on forming a united opposition party. The talks culminated in the launch of the People’s Freedom Party “For Russia without Lawlessness and Corruption” on 13 December 2010, with Kasyanov, Boris Nemtsov, Vladimir Ryzhkov and Vladimir Milov as co-chairs.

Following liberalisation of party-registration rules, RNDS dissolved its structures and in June 2012 completed a merger into the newly registered Republican Party of Russia – People’s Freedom Party (RPR-PARNAS).

== See also ==
- Dissenters' March
- The Other Russia
- United Civil Front
- Mikhail Kasyanov
- Yabloko
