= Vesna (Russia) =

Youth political movement in Russia

Youth Democratic Movement "Vesna" Молодёжное демократическое движение «Весна»
- Leader: Federal Coordinating Council
- Founder: Maxim Reznik
- Founded: 3 February 2013
- Merger of: Youth Yabloko branch Oborona; Youth Solidarnost branch
- Split from: Yabloko
- Headquarters: Saint Petersburg
- Ideology: Liberal democracy Human rights Anti-corruption
- Political position: Big tent
- European affiliation: European Liberal Youth
- International affiliation: International Federation of Liberal Youth
- Colours: Green
- Slogan: "Freedom, Equality, Adequacy!" (Russian: «Свобода, равноправие, адекватность!»)

Party flag

Website
- vesna.democrat

The Youth Democratic Movement "Vesna" (Russian: Молодёжное демократическое движение «Весна», romanized: Molodozhnoye demokraticheskoye dvizheniye "Vesna", lit. 'Spring') is a Russian liberal democratic youth movement based in Saint Petersburg.

The movement has full membership in the International Federation of Liberal Youth and European Liberal Youth.

== History ==
=== Foundation ===
The movement originated in early 2013, when a number of members of the Saint Petersburg branch of the Youth Yabloko, after they were expelled from the party, with the support of deputy Maxim Reznik, formed a new democratic movement, uniting with other youth liberal forces - the regional youth branch of the Solidarnost movement and the youth movement "Oborona". As was approved at the founding meeting, the movement will not officially have a single leader - instead, the governing and program functions will be carried out by the Federal Coordinating Council, consisting of five people. Immediately after the creation of the movement, the movement received criticism from Yabloko representatives for the "linguistic deafness of the organizers"

The movement was originally called the Young Democrats. Under this name, they held several actions, including against the Dima Yakovlev Law and the destruction of the children's hospital, and then renamed "Vesna".

=== Activities ===
In 2013, the Vesna movement was engaged in a public campaign to develop night public transport in the city, called "Metro-24". In March 2013, activists of the movement took to Palace Square with a banner "Sudari, you will fail with your registration" in support of Moscow activists who opposed the "propiska law". In December 2013, the Vesna movement held a campaign dedicated to the Olympics in Sochi. Movement participant Alexander Gudimov held a relay race with a home-made torch - a design made from a saw and improvised materials.

In February 2014, Vesna activists went to the Ukrainian consulate in Saint Petersburg and the monument to Taras Shevchenko to express support for the "fraternal people". Participants of the pickets were holding a poster "Yanukovych, come to your senses! Your hands are covered in blood!".

On 5 April 2015, Vesna applied for membership in the International Federation of Liberal Youth, and on 17 April 2016, at the next annual meeting, received full membership status. In the same year, Vesna, having achieved fame in Saint Petersburg, moved to the regions. As a result, by 2018 the movement already had 10-12 active regional branches, among which there are city branches of Orenburg, Chelyabinsk, Ufa, Cheboksary and Yuzhno-Sakhalinsk.

In June 2015, activists of the movement installed a new "headstone" on the Field of Mars near the burial places of the victims of the revolutions and the civil war, the inscription on which reads: "An unknown soldier died in the Donbass in "peaceful" time. We do not abandon our own, but these were not ours. V.Putin».

In 2017, the movement supported the protests against corruption by the Prime Minister and ex-President of Russia Dmitry Medvedev, which took place after the release of the film "He Is Not Dimon to You".

Also, activists of the movement participated in the campaign for the admission of Alexei Navalny to the 2018 presidential election, and after his non-admission, they participated in the "Voter Strike". The protests were followed by pressure on the movement in the form of arrests of its members. Some of them had to leave the country.

Also in 2017, the movement organized the "Territory of Freedom" summer democratic camp and an action in support of Ruslan Sokolovsky, in which young men dressed as a priest and an FSB officer tried to catch the Pikachu Pokémon using pink butterfly nets.

In March 2019, police officers detained Navalny Headquarters employee and Mikhail Borisov, an activist of the Vesna movement. A protocol was drawn up against him under part 3 of Article 20.2 of the Code of Administrative Offenses. According to the policemen, the report on Borisov was drawn up for a rally near the government of Saint Petersburg, but it was not specified for which one. The day before, next to the building of the Smolny Institute, a toilet bowl with a fork and a poster "Your place is at the bucket" was placed. It also had the words "Beglov, clean" and "This fountain is for you" written on it.

Later in 2019, the Arte documentary Re: Die Unerschrockenen – Russlands Jugend rebelliert followed several Vesna activists, including Pavel Chuprunov, during his campaign in the Saint Petersburg municipal elections. In November 2019, police visited Chuprunov's home and served him with a summons to the prosecutor's office; administrative proceedings were subsequently opened under Article 20.33 of the Russian Code of Administrative Offences, concerning participation in an “undesirable organisation”. In 2020, he was among seven Vesna supporters who faced administrative proceedings over participation in an authorised Saint Petersburg memorial event for Boris Nemtsov.

On 30 March 2021, in Saint Petersburg, police detained four members of the Vesna movement, who, wearing balaclavas and carrying torches, were carrying flags with the Roskomnadzor logo in protest against the Twitter slowdown. They carried the flags along Shahumyan Avenue for several minutes, after which about 30 police officers jumped out at them. In the same year, Skat media was founded in the St. Petersburg branch of Vesna.

In 2022, the movement became one of the organizers of protests in Russia against the Russian invasion of Ukraine. The movement coordinated protest actions on 27 February (about 2,800 detainees across Russia), 13 March (more than 800 detainees across Russia) and 2 April (more than 200 detainees across Russia). On 3 May, Vesna announced the action "They fought not for this", associated with the procession of the Immortal Regiment. The movement proposed to come out on May 9 with portraits of its veterans, anti-war slogans, photos of dead Ukrainians and destroyed cities. In response, according to Vesna, the organizers of the Immortal Regiment in the regions began to send instructions to counter the transformation of the procession into a political action against Russia's invasion of Ukraine.

With the beginning of mobilization in Russia, the Vesna movement began to organize all-Russian rallies under the slogan "No to mogilization (grave-isation)". Actions were held on 21 and 24 September.

In 2023, Bjørnar Moxnes, then leader of Norway's Red Party, publicly announced that he had nominated Vesna for the 2023 Nobel Peace Prize. Pavel Chuprunov, described by the Norwegian newspaper Dagsavisen as one of the movement's leaders, visited Norway at the party's invitation. Dagsavisen also described Vesna as having played a leading role in the Russian anti-war movement both inside Russia and abroad.

=== Repressions against Vesna ===
In May 2022, a criminal case was opened against members of the Vesna movement under the article on the creation of an NPO that infringes on the personality and rights of citizens (Article 239 of the Criminal Code). On 8 May, the homes of Vesna activists in St. Petersburg, Yevgeny Zateev, Valentin Khoroshenin, and Roman Maksimov, a former member of the movement in Veliky Novgorod, were searched, after which they were detained and brought to Moscow for interrogation. Also, searches were carried out at the parents of the Viasna coordinator Bogdan Litvin, who left the country, activist Polina Barabash, former members of the movement in St. Petersburg Alexei Bezrukov and Artyom Uymanen. In Moscow, public defender Timofey Vaskin, Skat media employee Angelina Roshchupko and former Anti-Corruption Foundation employee Ivan Drobotov were searched. All three were detained after the search as suspects in the Vesna case, which they never belonged to. Also in the capital, searches were carried out at the home of activist Daria Pak. By that time, Park had already left the country. Most of the participants in the Vesna movement have never heard her last name. As it turned out later, as part of the investigation of the case under the article on the creation of an NPO that infringes on the personality and rights of citizens (Part 3 of Article 239 of the Criminal Code), at least 13 people were searched.

On the morning of May 9, Zateev, Khoroshenin and Maximov were brought to the Basmanny Court. There they had to choose a measure of restraint. A support group gathered at the court, which was not allowed to attend an open court session, due to the fact that the court did not work on a holiday. The persons involved in the case, who were taken to the courtroom, had their detention in the temporary detention facility extended for another 72 hours. Roshchupko's lawyer, Mikhail Biryukov, went to court along with his colleagues in the case, but was detained halfway through: the police said that the lawyer was on the wanted list and should be taken to the Dorogomilovo police department. As a result, a measure of restraint, identical for all defendants, was chosen for two days in a row. On May 10, a ban on certain actions was appointed for Timofey Vaskin, Ivan Drobotov and Angelina Roshchupko. On May 11, similar restrictions were imposed on Roman Maksimov, Evgeny Zateev and Valentin Khoroshenin. In the Vesna case, the Basmanny Court chose a softer measure than the investigator had previously requested: the defendants cannot use the Internet, communicate with the defendants in the case and members of the Vesna movement, and also leave the house from 20:00 to 8:00. The defendants in the case are accused of "disagreeing with the political decisions of the country's leadership, including the decision to conduct a special military operation, they led a non-profit organization whose activities are associated with inciting citizens to commit unlawful acts"

In May, supporters of Vesna created a petition in support of the defendants in the case; at the beginning of June 2022, about 6,500 people signed it. In the same month, the Committee to Protect Journalists recognized the defendants in the criminal case of Vesna, who work for Skat media, as persecuted by media workers.

In December 2022, Russian authorities designated Vesna an extremist organisation. Six former members were arrested in June 2023 in a case concerning posts on the movement's social media accounts, including announcements of anti-war and anti-mobilisation protests. On 8 April 2026, the Saint Petersburg City Court sentenced the six to prison terms ranging from six years and two months to twelve years. Memorial recognised them as political prisoners.

== Reactions ==
In February 2013, when the movement was announced, Alexander Kobrinsky, deputy of the Legislative Assembly of Saint Petersburg from the Yabloko party, criticized it. The deputy called the participants in the movement "Veshnyaks", drawing an analogy with "a mill that operates only during the spring flood of waters", and with "the corpses of drowned people who floated up by spring".

Vesna received the most significant media coverage due to the organization and holding of protests on the territory of the Russia. According to Bogdan Litvin, one of the movement's coordinators, "theater" has always been preferred to single pickets, banners and rallies in the movement. He says that his "political teachers" at Yabloko told him: "10 people will see the picket, and if they write about the action, then 10,000 people".
