= The Other Russia (coalition) =

The Other Russia Другая Россия
- Founders: Garry Kasparov; Eduard Limonov; Mikhail Kasyanov
- Founded: 11 July 2006
- Dissolved: 10 July 2010
- Preceded by: Committee 2008
- Succeeded by: Solidarnost (2008); The Other Russia of E. V. Limonov (2010); For Russia without Lawlessness and Corruption (2010), Russian Opposition Coordination Council (2012)
- Headquarters: Moscow
- Ideology: Anti-Putinism; Factions: Liberal democracy National democracy Social democracy Social liberalism Marxism–Leninism; Communism; Civic nationalism National Bolshevism; Soviet patriotism
- Political position: Big tent (Non-system opposition)
- Member parties: United Civil Front; National Bolshevik Party; Russian People's Democratic Union; Republican Party of Russia; Labour Russia; Oborona; Vanguard of Red Youth; People's Will Army; Freedom Nation
- Colours: White; Blue; Red
- Slogan: "We need Another Russia!" (Russian: "Нам нужна другая Россия!") "Russia without Putin!" (Russian: "Россия без Путина!")

Website
- www.theotherrussia.ru

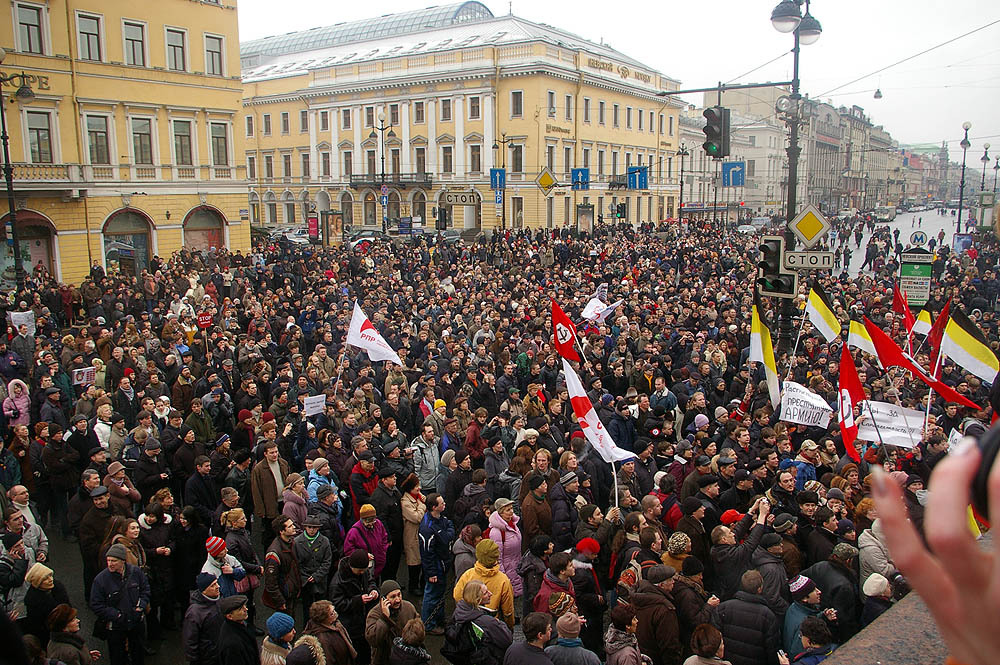
15,000 people in St. Petersburg on March 3, 2007. Dissenters' Marches were main events of the Other Russia.

The Other Russia (Russian: Другая Россия, romanized: Drugaya Rossiya), sometimes cited as Another Russia, was an umbrella coalition (2006–2008/2009/2010) that gathered opponents of President Vladimir Putin and was known as an organizer of Dissenters' Marches. The coalition brought together representatives from a wide variety of political and human rights movements, liberals, nationalists, socialists and communists (though the CPRF was absent), as well as individual citizens. The last Dissenters' March took place in 2008.

The group included both far-left, centre, and far-right opposition leaders as well as mainstream liberals such as former world chess champion and United Civil Front leader Garry Kasparov (in 2006–2007), the radical National Bolshevik Party leader Eduard Limonov, and the far-left Vanguard of Red Youth. In 2010, the coalition was dissolved.

== History ==
The Other Russia was formed during a constitutional meeting in July 2006, (during the G8 summit) in Moscow. Western diplomats, including British Ambassador to Russia Anthony Brenton, U.S. Assistant Secretary of State for Democracy, Human Rights, and Labor Barry Lowenkron, and U.S. Assistant Secretary of State for European and Eurasian Affairs Daniel Fried, were attending the conference. The two main liberal parties, Yabloko and the Union of Rightist Forces, were boycotting the event over the participation of what they consider to be nationalist and extremist groups.

During the summer of 2006, the society prepared a "coalition of national harmony", designed to accumulate common positions among its members. Work on several agenda items are discussed in specialized work groups. The final text was presented for a general discussion at a meeting on November 22, 2006. On September 25, 2006, The Other Russia was declared a "national forum".

On December 16, 2006, the first joint political rally took place in Moscow, named the "Dissenters' March". The name was first used by Garry Kasparov in 2005. Later, on March 3, 2007, the next "Dissenters' March" took place in Saint Petersburg, which was the largest opposition rally made in recent years in Russia.

A further "Dissenters' March" took place on April 14, 2007 in Moscow. Several people, including Garry Kasparov and former prime minister Mikhail Kasyanov, were arrested, but released some hours later. Another rally was held on April 15 in Saint Petersburg.

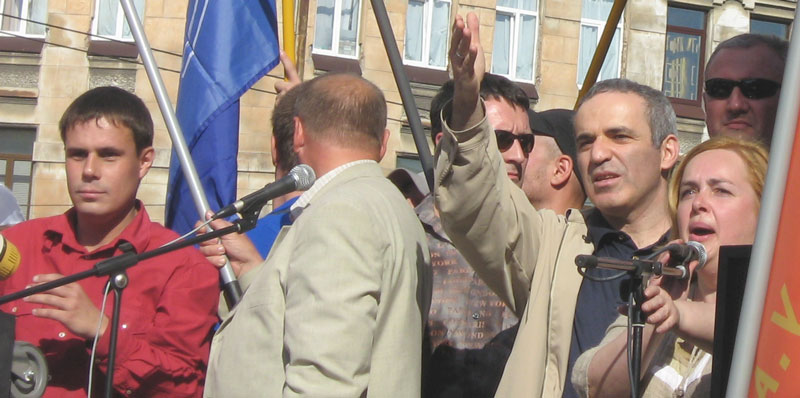
Leaders of the Other Russia Andrei Dmitriev and Garry Kasparov on march

== Key people ==
- Lyudmila Alexeyeva (Moscow Helsinki Group)
- Mikhail Delyagin (Institute for Globalization Issues)
- Yuri Dzhibladze (Center for Development of Democracy and Human Rights)
- Viktor Gerashchenko (Rodina, former chairman of the Soviet and Central Bank of Russia)
- Andrei Illarionov (Former senior economic advisor to the president)
- Garry Kasparov (United Civil Front)
- Eduard Limonov (National Bolshevik Party)
- Yelena Lukyanova (Law Professor at Moscow State University)
- Vladimir Ryzhkov (Republican Party of Russia)
- Georgy Satarov (Information Science for Democracy - INDEM)
- Sergei Udaltsov (Vanguard of Red Youth/Left Front/Russian United Labour Front)

=== Former members ===
- Mikhail Kasyanov (Russian People's Democratic Union, former prime minister); due to The Other Russia failure to agree on a single presidential candidate, Kasyanov left The Other Russia in July 2007.

== See also ==
- Dissenters' March
- National Bolshevism
- Liberalism in Russia
- Russian nationalism
- Radical nationalism in Russia
