= Our Choice (Russia) =

Russian Democratic Party «Our Choice» Российская демократическая партия «Наш выбор»
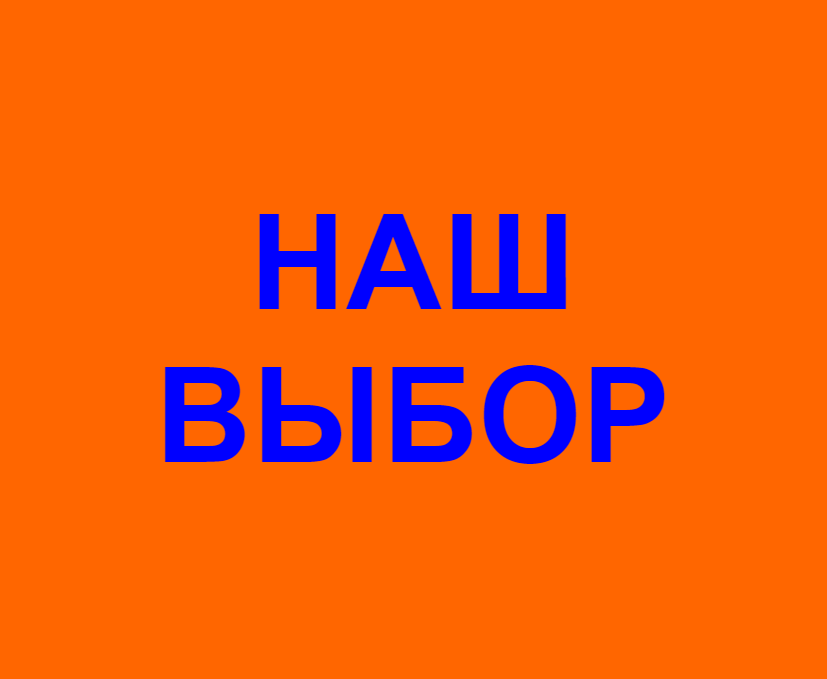
- Abbreviation: RDP Our Choice (English); РДП Наш выбор (Russian)
- Leader: Irina Khakamada
- Founded: 30 October 2004
- Dissolved: 8 April 2006
- Split from: Union of Right Forces
- Merged into: Russian People's Democratic Union
- Headquarters: 13th Building, Armyansky Lane, Moscow, Russia. 101990
- Membership (2004): 52,000
- Ideology: Liberalism; Social liberalism
- Political position: Centre to centre-right
- National affiliation: Committee 2008 (2004-2005)
- Colours: Orange; Blue
- Slogan: "Modern people - Modern power" (Russian: "Современным людям — Современную власть")

Party flag
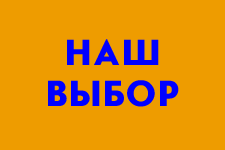

Website
- nashvibor.ru

Russian Democratic Party «Our Choice» (RDP Our Choice; Russian: Российская демократическая партия «Наш выбор», romanized: Rossiyskaya demokraticheskaya partiya «Nash vybor»)—was a liberal opposition unregistered political party in Russia, existed from 2004 to 2006 under the chairmanship of the former co-chair of the Union of Right Forces - Irina Khakamada

== History ==
The founding congress of the party was held on October 30, 2004 in Moskovsky. A decision was made to create a party, the charter and the "Manifesto of a Free Man" (Party Program) were adopted. Irina Khakamada was elected chairman of the party.

176 delegates from 58 constituent entities of the Russian Federation were elected to the party congress. The guests at the congress were members of the Committee 2008 - A Free Choice: Boris Nemtsov, Sergei Ivanenko, editor-in-chief of Moskovskiye Novosti Yevgeny Kiselyov, members of the leadership of the Union of Right Forces party Boris Nadezhdin, Leonid Gozman and others.

Irina Khakamada began to develop the idea of building a party after she left the Union of Right Forces.

On October 9, 2005, for the elections to the Tomsk City Duma, the Republican Party of Russia and the RDP "Our Choice" nominated a single electoral bloc to the City Duma, which was subjected to pressure from the authorities.

At the end of 2005, Irina Khakamada announced that it was inexpedient to submit documents for registration of the RDP Our Choice, urging its members to join the Democratic Party of Russia (DPR) to elect former Prime Minister of Russia Mikhail Kasyanov as the party leader.

On December 17, 2005, two alternative congresses of the DPR were held, but the Ministry of Justice did not recognize the legitimacy of the congress, at which Kasyanov was elected leader.

On April 8, 2006, the founding conference of the Russian People's Democratic Union movement was held, Mikhail Kasyanov was elected chairman, Irina Khakamada became a member of the Presidium of the movement, after which the activities of the party RDP Our Choice finally ceased to exist.

In 2004, the party had 52,000 members in 52 regions of Russia.
