= Committee 2008 =

Committee 2008: A Free Choice Комитет 2008: Свободный выбор
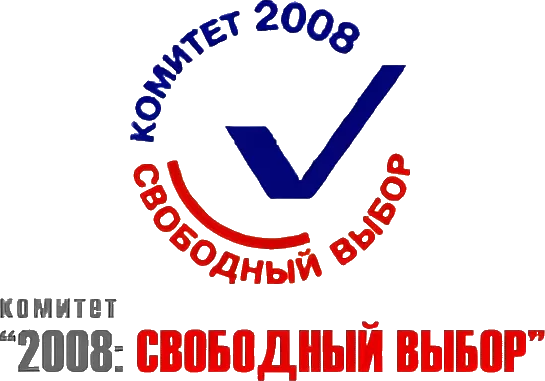
- Leader: Garry Kasparov
- Founded: 17 January 2004
- Dissolved: June 2005
- Succeeded by: United Civil Front; The Other Russia
- Headquarters: Moscow
- Ideology: Liberalism; Liberal democracy
- Political position: Big tent
- Member parties: Yabloko; Union of Right Forces; Our Choice; Republican Party of Russia
- Colours: Grey; Blue; Red
- Slogan: "We need Another Russia!" (Russian: "Нам нужна другая Россия!") "Russia without Putin!" (Russian: "Россия без Путина!")

Website
- www.theotherrussia.ru

"Committee 2008: A Free Choice" (Russian: Комитет 2008: Свободный выбор; Komitet 2008: Svobodnyy vybor) was an umbrella organization of the Russian democratic opposition chaired by Garry Kasparov. The Committee opposed Russian President Vladimir Putin and its goal was to facilitate free and democratic presidential elections in 2008; it existed for less than two years, launching on 29 January 2004 and disbanding in the spring of 2005.

== History ==
The Committee was formed in response to the failure of Yabloko and the Union of Right Forces to gain any seats in the 2003 elections to the State Duma, and to the growing authoritarianism of President Vladimir Putin who was re-elected in March 2004 with over 70% of the votes cast.

The Committee's goal was to ensure free and fair presidential elections in 2008. Putin was due to step down as President, after serving two terms, and the Committee intended to work against the election of his chosen successor, whoever that might be. The chairman of the 2008 Committee was Garry Kasparov; the original signatories of the 2004 declaration were Mikhail Berger, Vladimir Bukovsky, Alexander Golts, Igor Irtenyev, Vladimir Kara-Murza, Yevgeny Kiselyov, Yulia Latynina, Dmitry Muratov, Boris Nemtsov, Sergey Parkhomenko, Alexander Ryklin, Viktor Shenderovich, and Irina Yasina. Others who joined later included politicians Sergey Ivanenko, Vladimir Ryzhkov, and Irina Khakamada.

The Committee was short-lived, holding its last meeting in summer 2005. A number of its members subsequently helped to set up the United Civil Front and the much broader Other Russia coalition (2006-2010) which were actively engaged in protest activities in 2007 and 2008.
