= Georgy Satarov =

Russian mathematician and politician

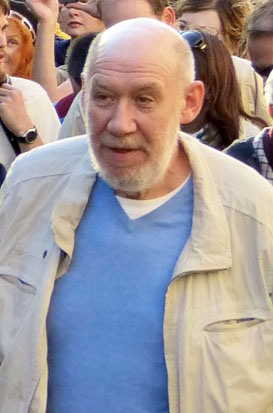
Satarov in 2014

Georgy Aleksandrovich Satarov (Russian: Георгий Александрович Сатаров; born August 22, 1947, in Moscow), is a Russian mathematician, politician, political scientist and a former aide to Russian president Boris Yeltsin (1994–1997). He has the federal state civilian service rank of 1st class Active State Councillor of the Russian Federation. Since October 1997, he has headed the InDem Foundation and specializes in researching Russia's political corruption.

== Biography ==
In 1972, he graduated from the Moscow Lenin Pedagogical Institute, Mathematics Department, where he stayed on as a researcher until 1990. In 1993, he participated in devising a new Russian Constitution, which was adopted in December that year. From February 1994 until September 1997, he was an aide to President Boris Yeltsin as a member of the Presidential staff.

Starting in December 2004, Satarov, along with Lyudmila Alexeyeva and Garry Kasparov, co-chaired the All-Russian Civic Congress, which Alexeyeva and Satarov left due to disagreement with Kasparov in January 2008. From July 2006 until July 2007, Satarov was one of the key members of Russia's pro-democracy movement The Other Russia.
