= Dissenters' March =

Series of Russian opposition protests

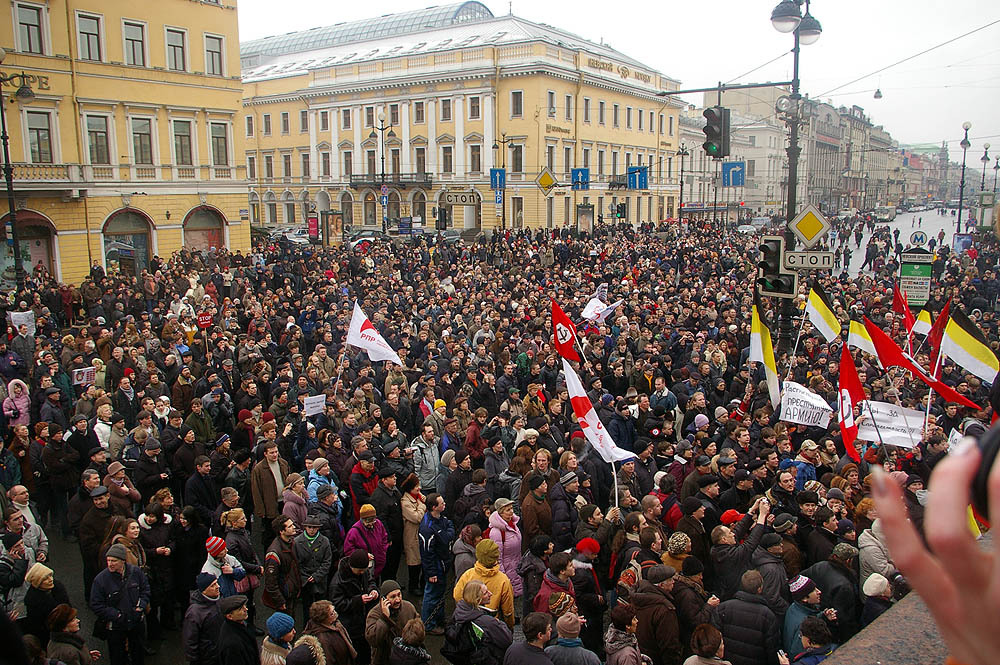
- Protesters at the meeting near Gostiny Dvor, Saint Petersburg, March 3, 2007
- Native name: Марш несогласных
- Date: December 16, 2006 – May 19, 2007
- Location: Moscow, Saint Petersburg, Nizhny Novgorod, Samara, Chelyabinsk
- Organised by: Garry Kasparov; Mikhail Kasyanov; Eduard Limonov
- Filmed by: Alyona Polunina (The Revolution That Wasn't)
- Participants: Coalition The Other Russia; National Bolshevik Party; United Civil Front; Vanguard of Red Youth; Russian People's Democratic Union

The Dissenters' March (Russian: Марш несогласных) was a series of Russian opposition protests that took place on December 16, 2006, in Moscow, March 3, 2007 in Saint Petersburg, March 24, 2007 in Nizhny Novgorod, April 14, 2007 for the second time in Moscow, April 15, 2007, again in Saint Petersburg, May 18, 2007, in Samara, and May 19, 2007, in Chelyabinsk. Some of them were featured in various media outlets.

It was preceded by opposition rallies in Russian cities in December 2005 which involved fewer people.

Most of the protests were unsanctioned. Usually, the authorities of the cities where the march was expected to take place have proposed protesters to meet at some more peripheral place and forbade processions. However, according to Russian legislation (prior to the Russo-Ukrainian War), organizers of a march should merely inform the authorities of the upcoming event and do not need a sanction, while the authorities have no right to prohibit a march in the specific places where it has been planned by the opposition, and demonstrators have usually defied the ban (apart from the rally in Saint Petersburg on April 15, 2007).

Since 2009, instead of dissenters marches, Russian opposition has held Strategy-31 rallies, though some of them have been accompanied by attempts of processions.

== Marches ==
=== Moscow, December 16, 2006 ===
The first march of the series took place in Moscow on December 16, 2006.

=== Saint Petersburg, March 3, 2007 ===
The first march in Saint Petersburg took place on Saturday, March 3, 2007.

==== Political context and organization ====
Taking place a year before the presidential election scheduled on March 2, 2008, the St. Petersburg protest also came ahead of the local elections to the Saint Petersburg Legislative Assembly to be held on March 11, 2007. While leaders of Communist party and democratic Union of Right Forces which were going to contest for votes didn't take part in the march (as well as other major parties), the action was joined by St. Petersburg department of social-liberal party Yabloko which had been eliminated from the upcoming local legislative election for technical reasons earlier in February.

The unsanctioned protest rally was organized by The Other Russia, a broad umbrella group that includes both left and right-wing opposition leaders, including National Bolshevik Party with its leader Eduard Limonov, far-left Vanguard of Red Youth, and far-left Labour Russia of Viktor Anpilov, as well as right-wing liberal people such as former world chess champion and United Civil Front leader Garry Kasparov and former Prime Minister of Russia and People Democratic Union leader Mikhail Kasyanov. Sergey Gulyayev, Mikhail Amosov and Natalya Yevdokimova, Democratic faction deputies in the Saint Petersburg Legislative Assembly who represented Yabloko, and Maxim Reznik, leader of the party in Saint Petersburg, took part in the protest, as well as other Saint Petersburg citizens of different ages and political persuasions. Gulyayev was elected chairman of the organizing committee.

==== Preventive countermeasures ====
Governor Valentina Matviyenko, appearing on Channel 5 news bulletins on Friday evening (March 2), warned people not to join those she called extremists. Warnings were broadcast on public address systems in the underground advising people to stay away from the rally.

The police raided apartments of Saint Petersburg opposition activists early on Saturday morning and quite a few were pulled out of trains heading for St. Petersburg from Petrozavodsk and Murmansk.

==== Number of demonstrators ====
The rally became one of the biggest demonstrations of the opposition in recent years.

Police stated that 800 participated in the march. According to correspondent of Vedomosti newspaper, there were more than 2,000 participants. Interfax news agency estimated the number of participant between 2,000 and 3,000. Saint Petersburg internet newspaper Fontanka.ru wrote that from 2,000 to 5,000 took part in the march. Newsru reported that the rally collected about 4,000 to 6,000 demonstrators. According to claims by Garry Kasparov the total number was around 6,000 protestors. On the article written at Daily Journal (ej.ru), Garry Kasparov stated that he believes around 7,000 individuals were taking part in the March, and on Nevsky Prospect, the main avenue of St. Petersburg, around 4,500 marched. Liberal opposition news website Grani.ru alleged that around 8,000–10,000 were participating in the march. The largest number was claimed by the leader of NDSM, Yulia Malysheva, who claimed there were 15,000 participants.

Russian police dispersed the protesters, detaining 113 people. According to police, all of the detainees were released shortly except for two bodyguards of Eduard Limonov, who got 15 days of arrest for "organization of mass disorders". Most of the detainees were convicted and given money penalties.

==== Course of events ====
Despite the fact that the organizers had been denied permission for the rally by the city authorities, several thousand people defied the ban, facing about 3,000 police officers and OMON summoned up from St. Petersburg, the Republic of Karelia, Pskov, and Vladimir. They broke through several OMON cordons and marched from the Oktyabrsky Concert Hall down the city's main avenue, Nevsky Prospekt, as far as Gostiny Dvor and the building of the pre-1917 Saint Petersburg City Duma. Dozens of people were beaten by OMON with truncheons. Automobile traffic was blocked by the police cordons and protesters.

After his speech, Kasparov declared the march to be over and stated that everyone should leave. At the same time, Michail Kasyanov left the march on a blue minibus.

People shouted "Russia without Putin!", "Shame!", "Give the elections back!", "This is our city!" and "Out with the corrupt authorities!" as well as slogans against the Gazprom City skyscraper construction project. They called for the dismissal of Governor Matviyenko, a close Putin ally, accusing her of corruption and interference with small businesses in favor of large state-owned corporations.

Tatyana Voltskaya, a journalist working for Radio Free Europe who witnessed the protest, said, "When I came I saw a very tight police cordon. The police had left only two very narrow corridors for people. I would say that to be inside it was very unsafe because of a possible stampede. Police officers were speaking through megaphones. They urged people to leave the square and not to disturb the public order. It was not possible to hear what they were saying because the crowd was shouting 'Disgrace, disgrace!'"

Resolutions adopted by the March included: demands on federal policy (to allow opposition to participate in elections, reforms of judiciary, trials against corruptioners, restoration of direct gubernatorial elections abolished on Vladimir Putin's initiative in 2005); protests against actions of St. Petersburg Governor (mayor) Valentina Matviyenko and demands to dismiss her; and a block of social claims (such as usage of the stabilization fund to enhance pensions, or demonopolizing the market of public transportation).

Sergey Gulyayev, a member of the Saint Petersburg Legislative Assembly, said, "The government is afraid of the slightest disturbance. The government is fragile and scared, and will collapse with one push." Interior Ministry police moved through the protesters, taking Gulyayev's bullhorn, throwing it against a nearby building, and putting Gulyayev into a squad car in a headlock. As they did so protesters chanted, "Shame! Shame!"

==== Official reaction and media coverage ====
Valentina Matviyenko called the protesters "guest stars from Moscow" and "youths of extremist persuasion", accusing them of stirring turmoil ahead of the legislative elections, venting their discontent with the city's perceived dynamic development, and receiving financial support from dubious sources, such as imprisoned Mikhail Khodorkovsky and emigrated Boris Berezovsky.

Since February 27, 2007 the official website of Dissenters' March has been DDoS-attacked several times.

According to Garry Kasparov, the major informational resource of the March was the radio station "Echo of St. Petersburg", which informed people in a timely manner on the progress of the march.

The march was covered on BBC, CNN and EuroNews. On Russian television the event was most fully described on national channel Ren-TV. The pictures showed violent clashes of OMON with protesters.

Gazprom Media-owned NTV gave only a brief account of the event (Photo), and in a special report about strategies of contention of the major parties prior to elections mentioned the March as a minor political event (Video).

Channel One described the rally as "a clash with police, provoked by hooligans".

State-owned Russia channel reported on the March: "Authorities of St. Petersburg called an attempt to carry out unsanctioned action of protest in centre of the city a provocation. Radicals of all kinds — from fascists to leftists, calling themselves "uncompromising opposition", carried out the 'March of the Discontented' at Nevsky. The Governor of the "Northern Capital" Valentina Matviyenko has issued assurances that it was backed by the people who are against the political stability in the city before elections." "Valentina Matviyenko was outraged that organizers of the March called on the people to bring children and old men with them; many did so. Ranks of marching people completely blocked traffic at Ligovsky Prospect. Despite precautions and appeals to break up, the mass of extremist persuasion moved to Nevsky, provoking militia to use force."

=== Nizhny Novgorod, March 24, 2007 ===
The protest in Nizhny Novgorod scheduled for March 24 was banned by the city authorities and effectively prevented by police, as many of its leaders and expected participants had been arrested in advance and cordons had sealed off the expected meeting place, Gorky Square. Many OMON (riot police) troops arrived there from other regions of Russia. Although a group of protesters defying the ban managed to get through the barriers, they all have been detained. In all, 102 people were detained during the protest at the square or on their way there according to the official figures, 11 of them from Moscow, 6 from St. Petersburg and one from Latvia.

=== Moscow, April 14, 2007, and Saint Petersburg, April 15, 2007 ===
==== Moscow ====
On Saturday, April 14, 2007, dissenters marched in central Moscow. Roughly 9,000 police and OMON (riot police) forces were deployed in Moscow on Saturday according to the official figures, outnumbering the demonstrators by far. The troops arrived from Ryazan Oblast, Kaluga Oblast, Voronezh Oblast, Rostov Oblast, Lipetsk Oblast, Tver Oblast, North Ossetia, Udmurtia, Mordovia, Bashkortostan, and Mariy-El. Former Russian Prime Minister Mikhail Kasyanov, libertarian economist and former economic policy adviser to President Vladimir Putin Andrey Illarionov, National Bolshevik Party leader Eduard Limonov, former world chess champion and United Civil Front leader Garry Kasparov, screenwriter Viktor Shenderovich, opposition State Duma deputy Vladimir Ryzhkov, Union of Right Forces leader Nikita Belykh, as well as Georgy Satarov, Irina Hakamada, and many others took part in the rally.

Demonstrators were going to start the march at Pushkin Square, a prominent public space, but were denied permission by the authorities as Molodaya Gvardiya, youth wing of United Russia, had been given a permission to meet there for the same time. The authorities suggested the march organizers to hold their rally at Turgenev Square, a more peripheral spot. The pro-Kremlin youth group, which had obtained the permit in order to deny the central square to the protesters, did not hold a rally there, but the square was cordoned off by police on the night before the protest.

Defying the ban, participants of the anti-government protest, however, attempted to march about 2 km along the Boulevard Ring from Pushkin Square to Turgenev Square. Police dispersed about a half of them on their way there and detained some people, including Garry Kasparov, Yabloko youth wing leader Ilya Yashin, Yes! Youth Movement leader Maria Gaidar, Vanguard of Red Youth leader Sergei Udaltsov, People Democratic Youth Union leader Yuliya Malysheva, and National Bolshevik Party leader Eduard Limonov. Kasparov yelled out of a police van to a Canadian television crew "Tell your leaders this is a police state!" Police attempted, but failed to detain Mikhail Kasyanov, surrounded with bodyguards. Protesters chanted: "We need another Russia!", "Russia without Putin!", "No to the police state!", "Beasts! Fascists! Shame!", "This is our city!" From about 1,000 to 2,500 demonstrators managed to get through several OMON cordons and reach Turgenev Square, where Mikhail Kasyanov gave a speech. Kasyanov claimed that the protesters will seek free and fair elections.

As the demonstration ended, the remaining participants headed for the nearby metro station, but riot police formed a gauntlet on their way. Scores of demonstrators was beaten by police with truncheons and detained, as well as Russian and foreign journalists covering the event and passersby. According to police, about 170 or 250 protesters were detained during the event.

Kasparov was fined 1,000 rubles (about $40) by a court late in the evening and released.

Andrey Illarionov, former economic policy adviser to President Vladimir Putin and now a participant of the rally, claimed later on Saturday in an interview to the Echo of Moscow radio station that the authorities' treatment of the march had to be considered a criminal offense under Article 31 of the Russian Constitution.

The Moscow authorities called the protest attempt at provocation, successfully contained by the police.

==== Saint Petersburg ====
The Sunday, April 15, 2007, rally in Saint Petersburg was organized for the second time in the city by the local subdivision of the Other Russia organization, led by Sergey Gulyayev, and supported by the local branch of Yabloko and its leader Maxim Reznik. This time the city authorities sanctioned the rally to be held between the noon and 2 p. m., but nevertheless refused to permit protesters to march to City Hall. President Vladimir Putin visited the city on the night before the event together with former Italian Prime Minister Silvio Berlusconi and American film actor of Belgian origin Jean-Claude Van Damme to watch a martial arts contest, but did not comment on the protest. Berlusconi noted that the number of anti-Putin protesters had been exaggerated by the media.

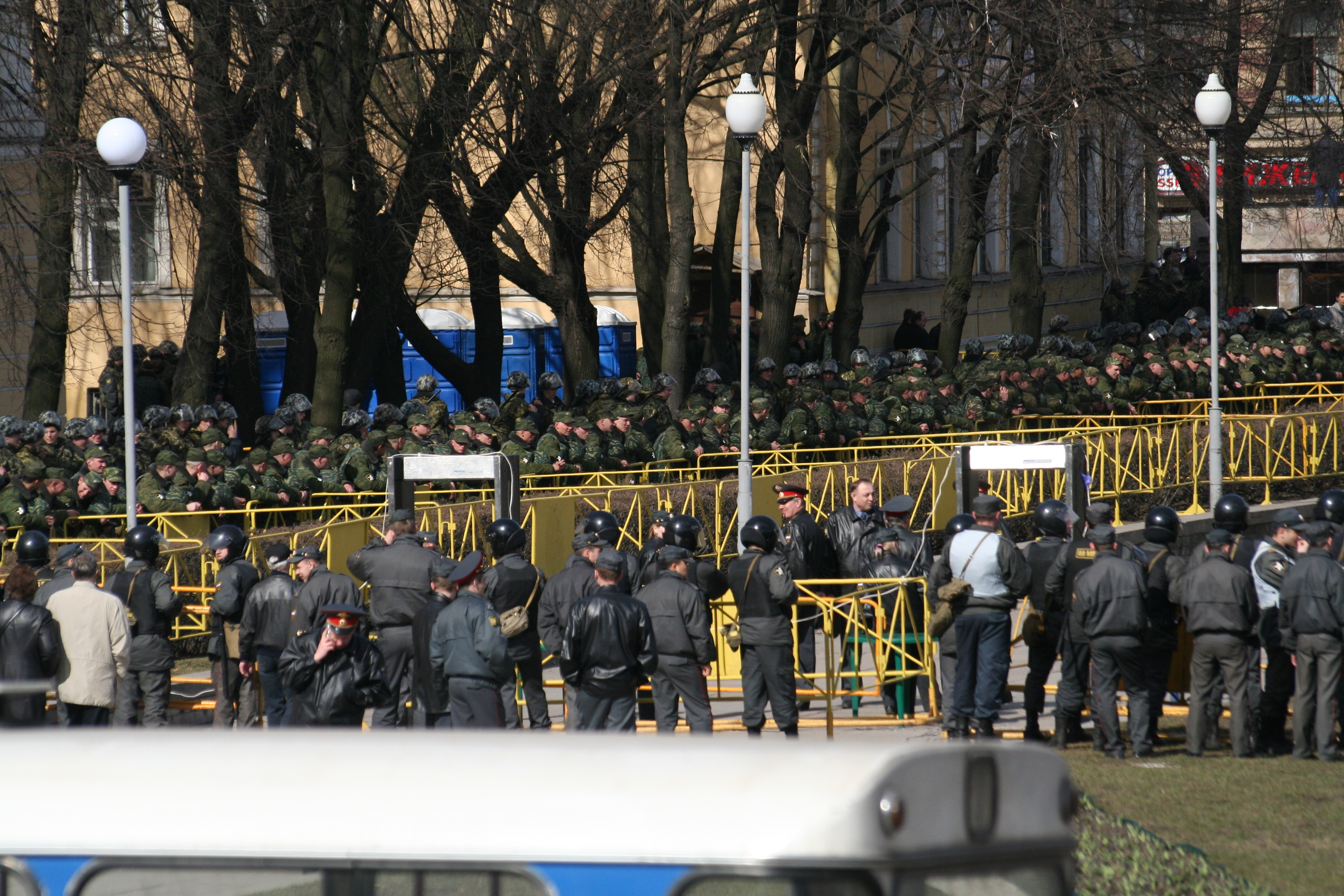
Some of the 3000 police officers cordoning off the square in Saint Petersburg

The protest in Saint Petersburg started at noon on Sunday at Pionerskaya Square, under heavy police surveillance, including a hovering helicopter and scores of OMON (riot police), both local and summoned from Pskov, Novgorod, Tver, and Arkhangelsk, cordoning off the area. Neighboring quarters were also closed to traffic and pedestrians. There were at least 1,500 police according to the march organizers. Only those protesters who had come by 12 p. m. were allowed to enter the square, leaving a number of others outside the barriers. The total number of demonstrators gathered was estimated as over 3,000 by the organizers and about 500 according to the police. Earlier, on Friday and Saturday, police raided Saint Petersburg Yabloko headquarters to confiscate publicity material about the march, demanded information about those involved in the printing and distribution of it and detained several distributors. There were some speculation that Garry Kasparov failed to take part in the Saint Petersburg event because he had been released from police detention too late in the aftermath of the Saturday rally in Moscow.

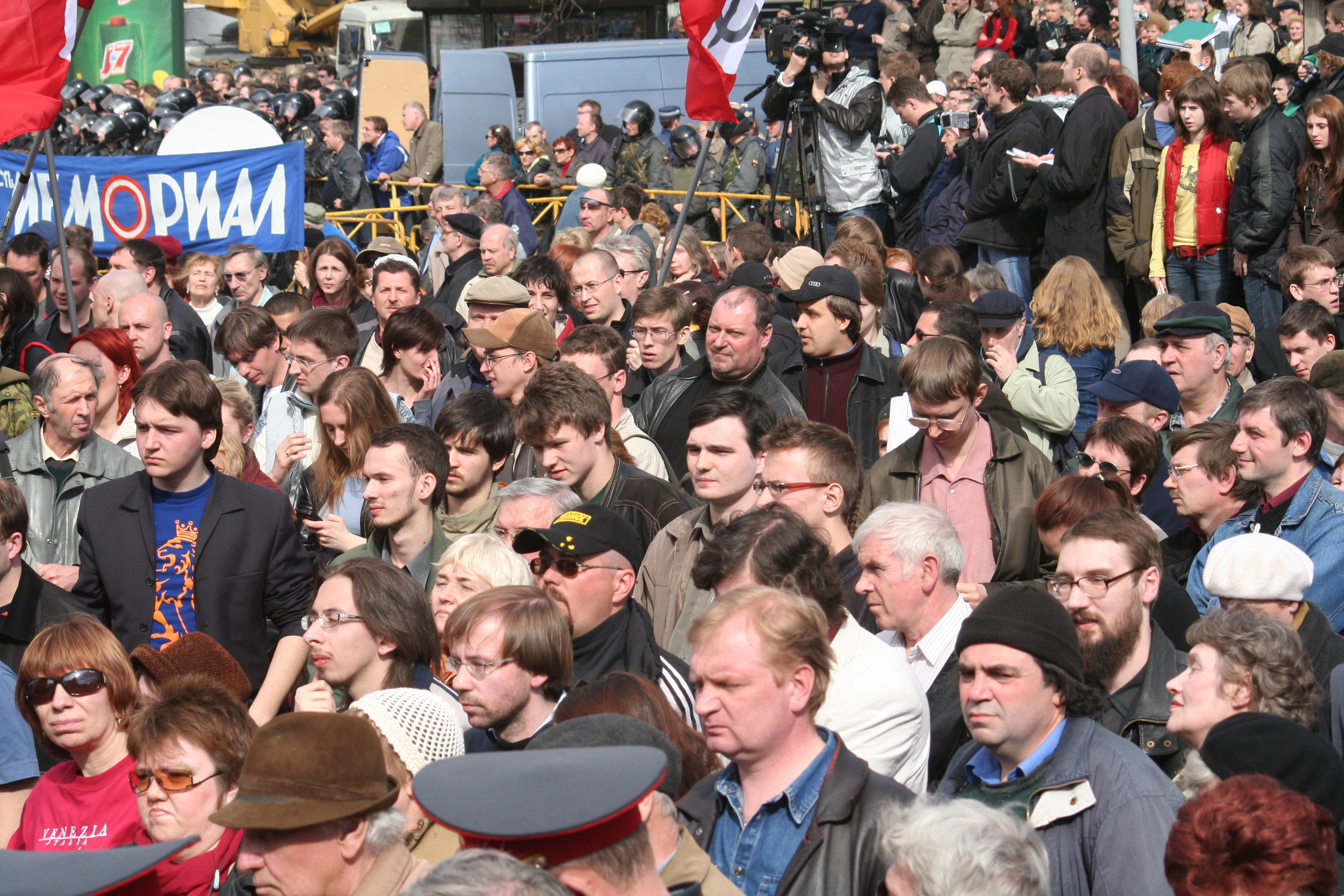
Pionerskaya Square, Saint Petersburg, April 15, 2007

During the meeting protesters chanted slogans targeting policies of President Vladimir Putin and Governor Valentina Matviyenko, demanding an end to corruption and police violence against dissenters, greater accountability of the authorities, as well as free mass media and elections, and claiming that they were not afraid. As in two hours protesters had begun to disperse, heading toward the nearby Pushkinskaya metro station, OMON started beating them as well as some passersby with truncheons. Some of the victims were later hospitalized. Police detained about 120 participants (according to official figures) including Eduard Limonov, Maxim Reznik and Sergey Gulyayev himself, with his left arm broken in the clash.

==== Reaction ====
On Sunday evening, Russia TV Channel broadcast a shortened and recut version of a French documentary alleging that the recent revolutions in Eastern Europe (Serbia, Georgia and Ukraine) had been masterminded by the U.S. government, which had been heavily advertised and has been perceived by many as an effort to counter effects of the Saturday and Sunday protests. The protests themselves enjoyed little attention from the state-owned television channels.

In an interview on Russia Today TV aired on April 17, President Vladimir Putin's spokesman Dmitry Peskov called Dissenters Marches of the weekend extremely insignificant. On April 16, European Commission spokeswoman Christiane Hohmann expressed concern over the police response and said that EU foreign ministers would raise the issue at talks with Russia in Luxembourg next week. U.S. White House spokeswoman Dana Perino also voiced concern over "an emerging pattern of use of excessive force" by the authorities with special reference to police's treatment of journalists.

However, opinions varied. On April 21, pro-Kremlin political analyst Gleb Pavlovsky claimed in his weekly program Real Politics aired on NTV that the OMON troops that had dispersed the protesters last week were to be considered heroes.

=== May 29, 2007: Voronezh ===
A smaller march was held in Voronezh on May 29, 2007.

According to Garry Kasparov the authorities took maximum efforts to break the march and fulfilled their goals. The destination of the March was planned to be on Lenina Square in city center, but at the last hours city authorities transferred the meeting to Admiralteiskaya Square. Around 40 participants started movement from the city center. By 6:30 pm OMON had displaced the participants from the square and cleaned it.

=== June–October 2007 ===
- June 12: Murmansk
- June 9: Saint Petersburg (3rd)
- June 11: Moscow (3rd)
- June 30: Ryazan
- October 7: Moscow (4th)

=== November 2007: Saint Petersburg and Moscow ===
Other marches took place on November 24 in Moscow (5th), on November 25 in Saint Petersburg (4th), and in several smaller cities.

Police broke up anti-Putin demonstrations in Moscow, detaining former world chess champion Garry Kasparov, who had become an outspoken critic of the government. Kasparov was sentenced on Saturday to five days imprisonment for organising an unsanctioned rally and refusing to obey police orders. He told reporters the charges were "unfounded" and accused the Russian leader of having recourse to scare tactics. In Saint-Petersburg Russian authorities geared for fresh protests on Sunday.

Human rights activist Lev Ponomarev, who was also arrested, accused the authorities of a "completely exaggerated reaction".

The Moscow march of November 24 was accompanied by actions in Ryazan, Kaluga, Rostov-on-Don and Nizhniy Novgorod.

On November 25 marches took part in Saint-Petersburg, where hundreds gathered as police moved in to make arrests, and also in Yaroslavl and Vladimir.

=== 2008 marches ===
- March 3: Protest rallies after presidential elections in Moscow, Saint-Petersburg, and more than 20 big cities
- December 14: Marches in Moscow and Saint-Petersburg; protest rallies in Kaliningrad and Vladivostok

== Media depictions ==
=== Films ===
- This is Our City (2007), by Aleksandr Shcherbanosov
- The Revolution That Wasn't (2008), by Alyona Polunina

=== Books ===
- 12 Who Don't Agree (2009), non-fiction book by Valery Panyushkin

=== Music ===
- Музыка НЕсогласных 1 (2007)
- Музыка НЕсогласных 2 (2008)
- Музыка НЕсогласных 3 (2009)

== See also ==
- Russian March
- Strategy-31
- 2011–13 Russian protests
