= Andrey Illarionov =

Russian economist and political scientist (born 1961)

Andrey Illarionov L.d'H. GC
- Андрей Илларионов
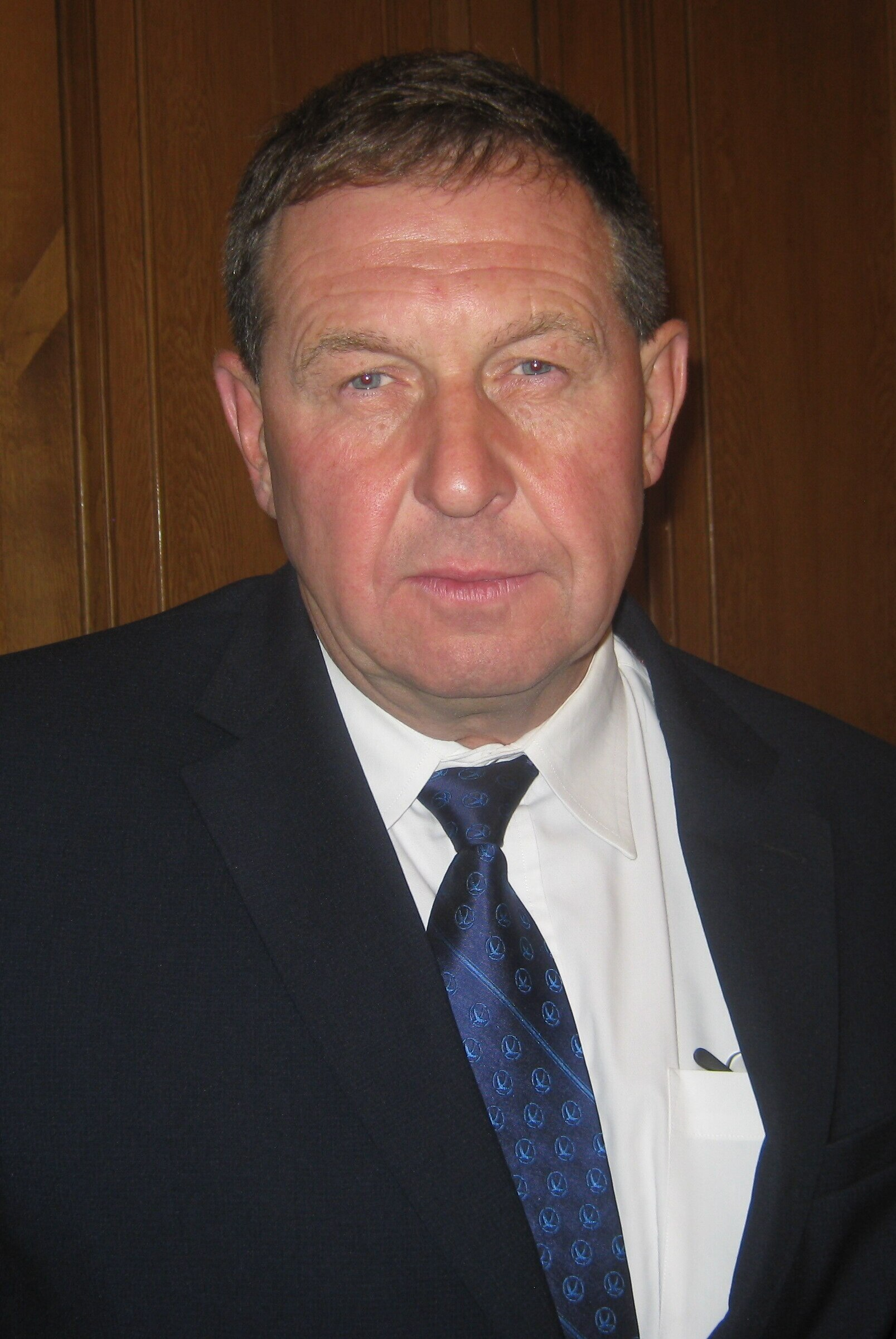
- Illarionov in 2017
- Born: 16 September 1961 (age 65); Sestroretsk, Leningrad oblast, USSR
- Known for: Sherpa of Russian president in G8 group, 2000–2005; Index of Freedom in the World design idea

Academic background
- Education: Candidate of Sciences, 1987, Macroeconomics, Leningrad University
- Alma mater: Economics Dept. (Note: [[Economics Faculty of Saint Petersburg State University (Q4530466)]]) of Leningrad University
- Influences: Ludwig von Mises; Austrian school; Libertarian economics

Academic work
- Institutions: Cato Institute, 2006–21; Senior fellow, Center for Security Policy, 2021–present, Washington, D.C.
- Awards: Legion of Honour, Grand'croix, France; St. George's Order of Victory, Georgia
- Website: Andrey Illarionov at LiveJournal

Andrey Nikolayevich Illarionov (Russian: Андрей Николаевич Илларионов, born 16 September 1961) is a Russian economist and former senior policy advisor to Vladimir Putin, the President of Russia, from April 2000 to December 2005. Since April 2021, he is a senior fellow at the non-governmental organization Center for Security Policy, which is based out of Washington, D.C. in the United States.

== Early life ==
Andrey Illarionov was born on 16 September 1961, in Sestroretsk, a municipal town of Saint Petersburg. At fifteen he started working at a communications office (telephone and postal services) in the town of Sestroretsk. He then went on to study economics at the Leningrad State University, graduating in 1983, and receiving a Ph.D. in economics in 1987.

From 1983 to 1984, and again from 1988 to 1990 Illarionov taught for the International Economic Relations Department of Leningrad State University. From 1990 to 1992 he was senior researcher at the Regional Economic Research Department of the Saint Petersburg State University of Economics and Finance.

== Career ==
From 1992 he became economic adviser to the Russian Deputy Prime Minister and Acting Prime Minister Yegor Gaidar and (until 1993) the first deputy head of the Economic Reform Centre of the Russian Government. From 1993 to 1994 Illarionov was the head of the Analysis and Planning Group of the Chairman of the Council of Ministers and the Government of Russia, Viktor Chernomyrdin, after which he went on to become the vice-president of the Leontyev International Social and Economic Research Centre, and director of the Moscow division. He created the Institute for Economic Analysis and was its director from 1994 to 2000.

Illarionov had predicted 1998 financial crisis and called for a devaluation of the Russian ruble in order to avoid the August 1998 financial meltdown.

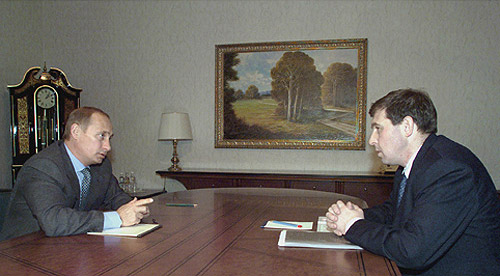
Illarionov with President Putin in 2000

On 12 April 2000, Illarionov was invited by Vladimir Putin to be his senior economic adviser and in May 2000 he became the personal representative of the Russian president (sherpa) in the G8. He played an important role in introducing the 13% flat income tax in Russia, in earlier repayment the Russian foreign debt, in creation the petroleum revenues-based Stabilization Fund of the Russian Federation and in bringing Russia's full-fledged membership into the political G8.

While he was a Kremlin economic adviser, he served on the supervisory board of the Central Bank of Russia and accessed the accounts of the Russian foreign state banks. He found that in 1992 the $1 billion IMF loan to Russia was used to prevent the default of the KGB- associated Eurobank in Paris, that Yegor Gaidar was behind the scam, and that Boris Fyodorov, who was the finance minister of Russia and a close associate of Illarionov, was not told of the scam. Eurobank was one of the most important finance centers of the Soviet Union and Russia for foreign intelligence operations of the KGB and GRU. Allegedly, in 1990, the Soviet Union had a $1.75 billion loan from Saudi Arabia, United Arab Emirates, and Kuwait as payment for the Soviet Union's veto of Desert Storm. Allegedly, after the failure of Vnesheconombank (VEB) resulting in its accounts frozen on 1 January 1992, this was the first debt that the Russian government had to pay through "Eurobank" in Paris ("Banque Commerciale pour l'Europe du Nord") and the Russian network of Roszagranbanks to the Soviet and Russian foreign intelligence associated finance centers including Evrofinance (Moscow), RTD France (Paris), Eurogrefi (Paris), and others. (Note: In 1992, the Russian government's official budget was only $148 million.)

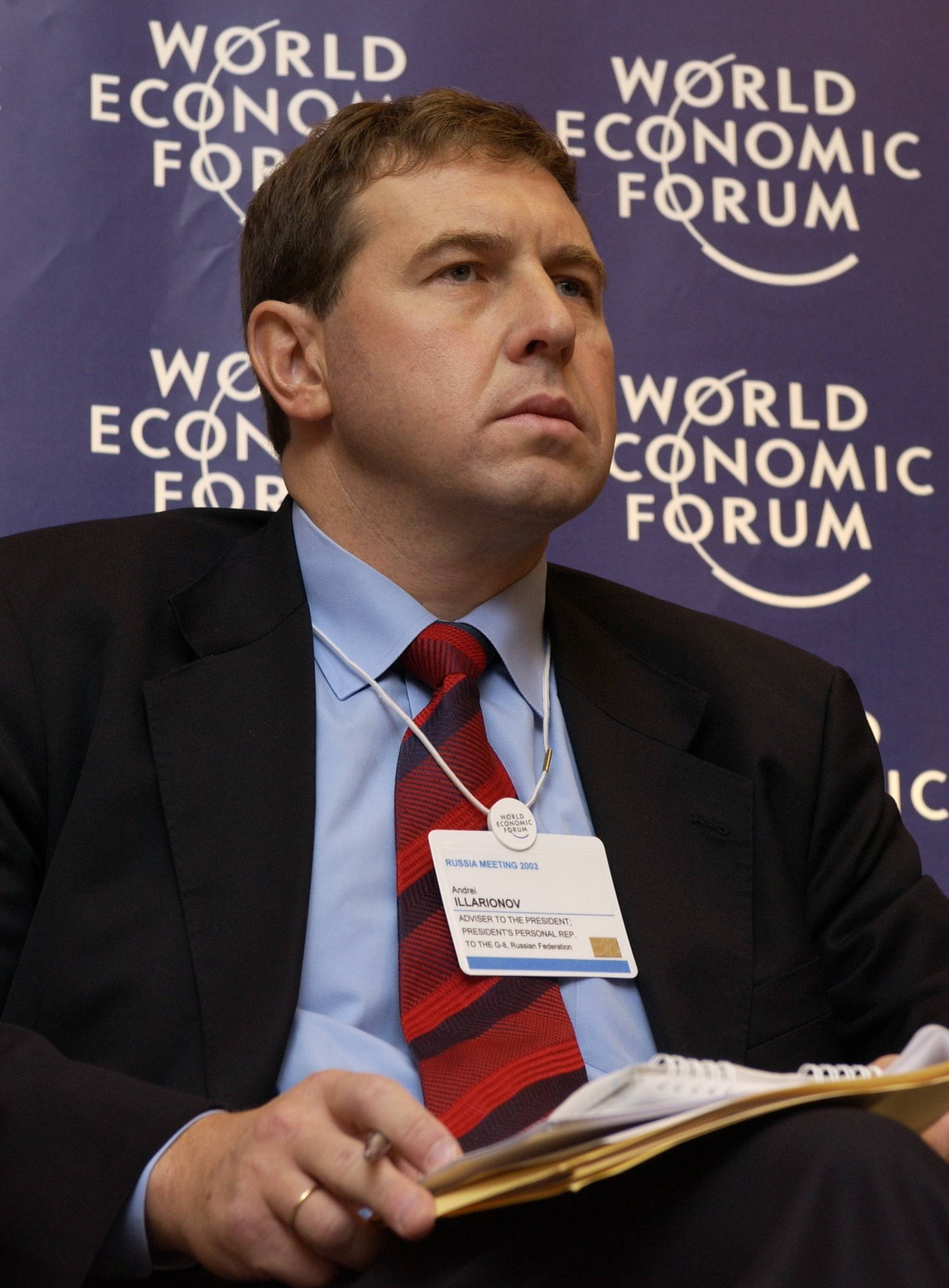
Illarionov as Putin's economic advisor at the World Economic Forum in Moscow, 2003

On 3 January 2005 Illarionov resigned from his position as presidential representative to the G8 because of the government troops' storm of the Beslan school on 3 September 2004 leading to death of 333 children, their parents and teachers. On 21 December 2005, Illarionov declared "This year Russia has become a different country. It is no longer a democratic country. It is no longer a free country". The Washington Post reported that he had cited a recent report by the human rights observer Freedom House. On 27 December 2005, Illarionov offered his resignation as economic adviser in protest against the stealing of billions of dollars by Putin's inner circle from the Russian state via the IPO of state-owned company Rosneft. He claimed that Russia was no longer politically free and was run by an authoritarian and corrupt elite. "It is one thing to work in a country that is partly free. It is another thing when the political system has changed, and the country has stopped being free and democratic," he said. He also claimed that he had no more ability to influence the government's course and that Kremlin put limits on him expressing his point of view. Illarionov was openly critical to such elements of the Russian economic policy as the Yukos affair, increasing influence of government officials on private sector and civil rights, as well as the Kremlin pressure on Ukraine in the Russia-Ukraine gas dispute. Illarionov has also been a proponent of recognition of Chechnya's independence.

== Dissident life ==
In October 2006, Illarionov was invited to be senior fellow at the Center for Global Liberty and Prosperity of the US libertarian think tank Cato Institute in Washington, D.C. In this position, he has stated that "[Russia's] new corporate state in which state-owned enterprises are governed by personal interests and private corporations have become subject to arbitrary intervention to serve state interests" as well as "new ways in which political, economic and civil liberties are being eliminated."

In October 2006, the same week as Putin declared the Assassination of Anna Politkovskaya "abominable in its brutality", Illarionov took up a position with the Cato Institute.

On 14 April 2007, and 9 June 2007, Illarionov took part in opposition Dissenters' Marches in Moscow and Saint Petersburg, respectively. He then observed that the repression was "brutal" and that in "a comparison with the 15 former Soviet republics, Russia is now third to last when it comes to economic growth."

While the Cato Institute is based in Washington, DC, Illarionov did not then plan to immigrate but rather to commute. He stopped travelling to Russia in 2017.

Illarionov is one of the 34 first signatories of the online anti-Putin manifesto "Putin must go", published on 10 March 2010.

In 2012 Illarionov wrote a book chapter entitled "A Few Theses on the Theory of Freedom and on Creating an Index of Freedom" for the Fraser Institute. His work was developed into the Index of Freedom in the World, and later the annual Human Freedom Index.

As a well known opponent to Vladimir Putin and his policies, in December 2014 he criticized former Czech president Václav Klaus' view that the European Union and the United States did more to escalate the war in Donbas than Vladimir Putin did.

In January 2015 Illarionov clashed with Mikhail Khodorkovsky over the 2014 Annexation of Crimea. Even then there was discussion of the Kremlin's "hybrid war". He was then living full-time in Washington.

In March 2016 Illarionov was frustrated at the label of Russia by dissidents as a "hybrid régime". Masha Gessen wrote that he felt that it was a pure dictatorship, and that "This is not a hybrid regime! Thinking about it that way is a mistake, and analytical mistakes like that can have long-term tragic consequences."

In January 2018 Illarionov was listed with others as an advisor to the US Treasury on the régime of sanctions over Crimea. This followed on from a 17 November 2017 article that he had co-authored along with Anders Åslund, Daniel Fried and Andrei Piontkovsky for the Atlantic Council entitled "How to Identify the Kremlin Ruling Elite and its Agents".

In April 2023 Illarionov co-authored the Declaration of Russia’s Democratic Forces.

== Views ==
=== Putin's rise to power ===
Illarionov, who was an advisor to Boris Yeltsin as well as to Putin, says that "Putin is an outstanding politician, and he carried out a very successful operation to win the trust of the" tightly knit group of men that then surrounded power in Russia in that era.

=== Climate change ===
In 2004 Illarionov likened the Kyoto Protocol to a "concentration camp for the world economy", the Soviet-era GULag forced penal labour camps, and called the Protocol "an international Auschwitz for economic growth".

=== 2008 Russo-Georgian war ===
Illarionov has questioned the official Russian version of the Russian-Georgian war that led to the Russian occupation of Georgia's provinces South Ossetia and Abkhazia. He has provided evidence that the war was launched by the Russian leadership that started aggression against Georgia on 6 August 2008 by bringing its military into South Ossetia and escalating the situation before the Georgian side was forced to respond in the night of 8 August.

=== 2008 Russian financial crisis ===
Illarionov has also stated that Moscow's intervention into Georgia scared away investors and was in part responsible for the 2008 Russian financial crisis. He has criticized the Russian government attacks on private sector in summer of 2008 that contributed to financial crisis.

=== 2010 Smolensk air disaster ===
In 2010 Illarionov criticised the official Russian investigation about the Smolensk air disaster and called the official version "naive". He was invited into an investigative commission created by Polish parliament.

=== Russian invasion of Ukraine in 2014 ===
On 4 February 2014, before the Russian intervention in Crimea, Illarionov predicted that Vladimir Putin was going to implement a military operation to effectively establish political control over Ukraine. In a 10 October 2013 interview with Serhiy Leshchenko, Illarionov revealed many of Putin's viewpoints during the early 2000s and that Putin desired to have Kuchma use force to put down the Orange Revolution but Kuchma refused, that Putin has an imperialist vision with respect to Ukraine, and that, similar to other tyrants such as Adolf Hitler, Putin is a tyrant and will leave as Russia's leader only in death.

In late March 2014, following the Revolution of Dignity and the annexation of Crimea by Russia, speaking to Svenska Dagbladet, Illarionov suggested that Vladimir Putin would seek to incorporate Ukraine, Belarus, parts of Georgia and the Baltic states into Russia.

On 9 June, he said that the beginning of the ceasefire and negotiations between the newly elected Ukrainian president Poroshenko and separatists of break-away republics at the East of Ukraine would ultimately result in a Russian attempt of establishing political control over the entirety of Ukraine.

=== Inevitable dissolution of the Russian Federation ===
In November 2018, Andrey Illarionov said in the chat of the Ukrainian portal GlavRed that the dissolution of Russian Federation is inevitable which is a natural process for multinational empires. Later in the same interview, when he was asked to name the thing that terrifies him the most in modern Russia, Illarionov listed political dictatorship, suppression of civil and political rights of citizens, and Kremlin's neo-imperial policies towards other countries, neighbors or not.

=== 2021 US Capitol attack ===
After the events of the 2021 United States Capitol attack in Washington D.C., Illarionov wrote on his blog that the Capitol police did not provide any resistance to demonstrators and quickly fell back into the building. The blog post is named "Reichstag fire" stating it as a trigger for the party in power to limit civil liberties. Following his post, the libertarian Cato Institute fired Illarionov for expressing his views about 6 January 2021 events.

=== 2022 Russian invasion of Ukraine ===
On 1 February 2022, Illarionov said that "Biden saves ratings with myths about "Russian Armed Forces' invasion" of Ukraine". He was quoted by RIAFAN.

In April 2022, Illarionov remarked during an interview with the BBC News agency that if Western countries "would try to implement a real embargo on oil and gas exports from Russia", then, in response, "probably within a month or two, Russian military operations in Ukraine, probably will be ceased, will be stopped". He stated that decisions involving Russian energy markets involved "very effective instruments" in terms of influencing senior leaders' behavior. Illarionov additionally declared that change in the Kremlin would happen "sooner or later" given that "it is absolutely impossible to have any positive future for Russia with the current political regime".

In June 2024 Illarionov was interviewed by the Kyiv Post. He proposed that the beginning of Putin's Ukrainian campaign occurred on 17 September 2003. In front of his high-level ministers on this day Putin laid claim to the territory of Ukraine. This was when Putin began his expansion, with the 2003 Tuzla Island conflict. Illarionov repeated this claim, which was made by him as early as summer 2014.

== See also ==
- Energy policy of Russia

== Bibliography ==
- Belton, Catherine (2020). Putin's People: How the KGB Took Back Russia and Then Took on the West. Farrar, Straus and Giroux. ISBN 978-0-374-23871-1.
- Illarionov, Andrey (4 May 2011). "Трудный путь к свободе" Часть вторая [The Hard Road to Freedom Part Two] (PDF). Kontinent 2010 (in Russian) (146). Archived (PDF) from the original on 25 March 2022. "See chapter 18. Missing billion pp. 150–153"
