= Viktor Shenderovich =

Russian satirist, writer, scriptwriter and radio host (born 1958)

- Виктор Шендерович
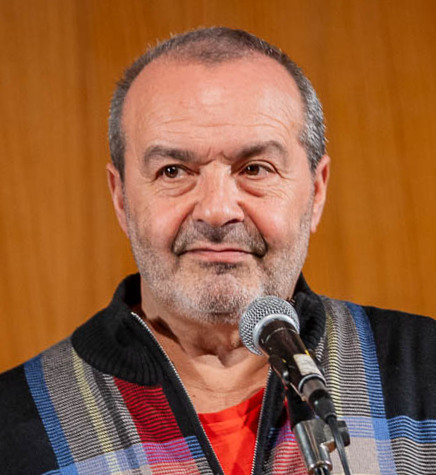
- Shenderovich in 2023
- Born: Viktor Anatolyevich Shenderovich; August 15, 1958 (age 68); Moscow, RSFSR, Soviet Union
- Education: Moscow State Art and Cultural University

Viktor Anatolyevich Shenderovich (Russian: Ви́ктор Анато́льевич Шендеро́вич; born August 15, 1958) is a Russian satirist, writer, scriptwriter and radio host.

== Biography ==
Shenderovich, born in Moscow into a family of Belarusian Jewish origin, graduated in 1980 from the Moscow State Art and Cultural University, specializing in "direction of volunteer theatrical groups". He is best known as a scriptwriter of the popular political puppet-show Puppets, which aired on NTV from 1994 to 2002. He hosted the satirical author program ''Total'' on NTV from 1997 to 2001 and on TV-6 in 2002. From 2003 to 2008 Shenderovich ran a weekly ''Processed Cheese'' program, on the Echo of Moscow radio-station. The texts of this program's editions were later collected in his 2010 book Better Two Heads Than One (Russian: Одна голова хорошо, а две лучше), with implied reference to Dmitry Medvedev (President of Russia from 2008 to 2012) and to Vladimir Putin (Prime Minister of Russia during the same period). Shenderovich was a columnist of The New Times, a liberal Russian weekly, from 2007 to 2020.

He is known as an outspoken critic of Vladimir Putin's rule and of the Russian government's stance on the war in Chechnya of 1994-1996. Shenderovich is among the 10 first signatories of the online anti-Putin manifesto "Putin Must Go" published in March 2010. On 26 December 2010, Shenderovich played a major role in organizing a "Moscow for Everyone" (Russian: Москва для всех) rally in the capital of Russia, in response to race riots which had occurred earlier in the month.

On November 27, 2021, Shenderovich announced that he had begun to apply for Israeli citizenship. On 30 December 2021, Russia's Ministry of Justice added Shenderovich to its list of "foreign agents".

On January 11, 2022, Shenderovich left Russia because of a pressure campaign against him by officials, including his controversial designation as a "foreign agent." As of 13 January 2022 he lived in Poland.

In June 2023, when flying to Tbilisi from Tel Aviv on an Israeli passport, Shenderovich was not allowed to enter Georgia. He was turned around at border control and put on a flight back to Israel without any explanation. He had been to Georgia several times before, most recently, just a few months previously.

=== Candidate ===
In 2005, Shenderovich ran as an independent candidate for a seat in a December 4 Moscow by-election to the State Duma, but came in second to the popular filmmaker Stanislav Govorukhin. The winner took 38% of votes and Shenderovich took 17%. Before the election, Shenderovich protested the "widely illegal and immoral practices" of Govorukhin in court, but the judge rejected his suit as unfounded.

In 2006, he published the book Nedodumets, in which he summarized his experience as a Duma candidate.
