= United Civil Front =

United Civil Front Объединённый гражданский фронт
- Abbreviation: UCF (English); ОГФ (Russian)
- Leader: Garry Kasparov
- Founded: May 18, 2005; 21 years ago
- Preceded by: Committee 2008
- Headquarters: Moscow
- Ideology: Liberal democracy Federalism
- National affiliation: The Other Russia (2006–2007); Opposition Coordination Council (2012-2013)
- Colours: White; Blue; Red
- Slogan: "We need Another Russia!" (Russian: "Нам нужна другая Россия!") "Down with the power of the Chekists!" (Russian: "Долой власть чекистов!") "No to the police state!" (Russian: "Нет полицейскому государству!")

Website
- www.rufront.ru

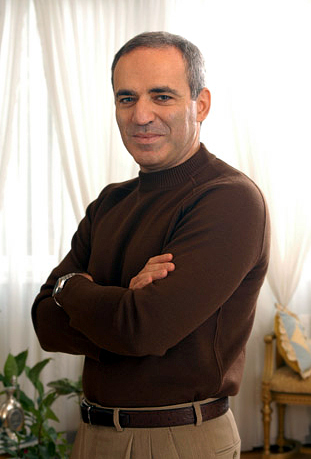
Garry Kasparov

United Civil Front (UCF; Russian: Объединённый гражданский фронт; ОГФ; Obyedinonnyy grazhdanskiy front, OGF) is a social movement in Russia founded and led by chess grandmaster Garry Kasparov. In 2006–2007 it was part of The Other Russia, an opposition coalition active in Moscow.

Upon the organization's founding, in 2005, Kasparov stated that the UCF "will work to preserve electoral democracy in Russia." Kasparov concluded the press conference by stating that, "The primary goal of the systemic opposition is to dismantle the currently existing system and create a free political floor on which free elections can be held in 2007–2008. The bottom line is to preserve the Russians’ right to elect a responsible government, both in presidential and parliamentary elections."

== Programme ==
The programme was accepted at the 3rd conference on February 25, 2006. it is founded on the four principles.

Fair democratic elections

1. Competition of electoral programmes, removability and responsibility of the power.
2. Equal access of the parties to mass-media.
3. Change electoral system from party-list proportional representation to majoritarian.

Restoration of federalism

1. To restore federal mechanism of the government.
2. To liquidate a dangerous disbalance in population incomes between Moscow and other regions.
3. To return democratic local self-government.
4. The democratic solution of problems in the national republics.

Elimination of Nomenklatura system

1. Reduction of presidential powers.
2. Liquidation of system of privileges and preferences for civil servants of all echelons.
3. Liquidation of the Presidential Administration, reduction of staff and functions of the president office.
4. Enact into law for secret services' intrusion in a social life and government.
5. Act of disqualification for the present high-ranking officials and secret services chiefs.
6. Enact into law the criminal liability for illegal enrichment of public persons and civil servants according to the United Nations Convention against Corruption.

Government for people, but not people for government

1. To repay old government debts to the citizens.
2. To establish social priority of the state budget.
3. To implement the constitutional and human rights.
4. To extirpate social discrimination.
5. To cancel compulsory military service; to make army professional. Discontinue internal military forces.
6. To ensure access of citizens to all information on activity and decisions of the state and local governments.

== Events ==
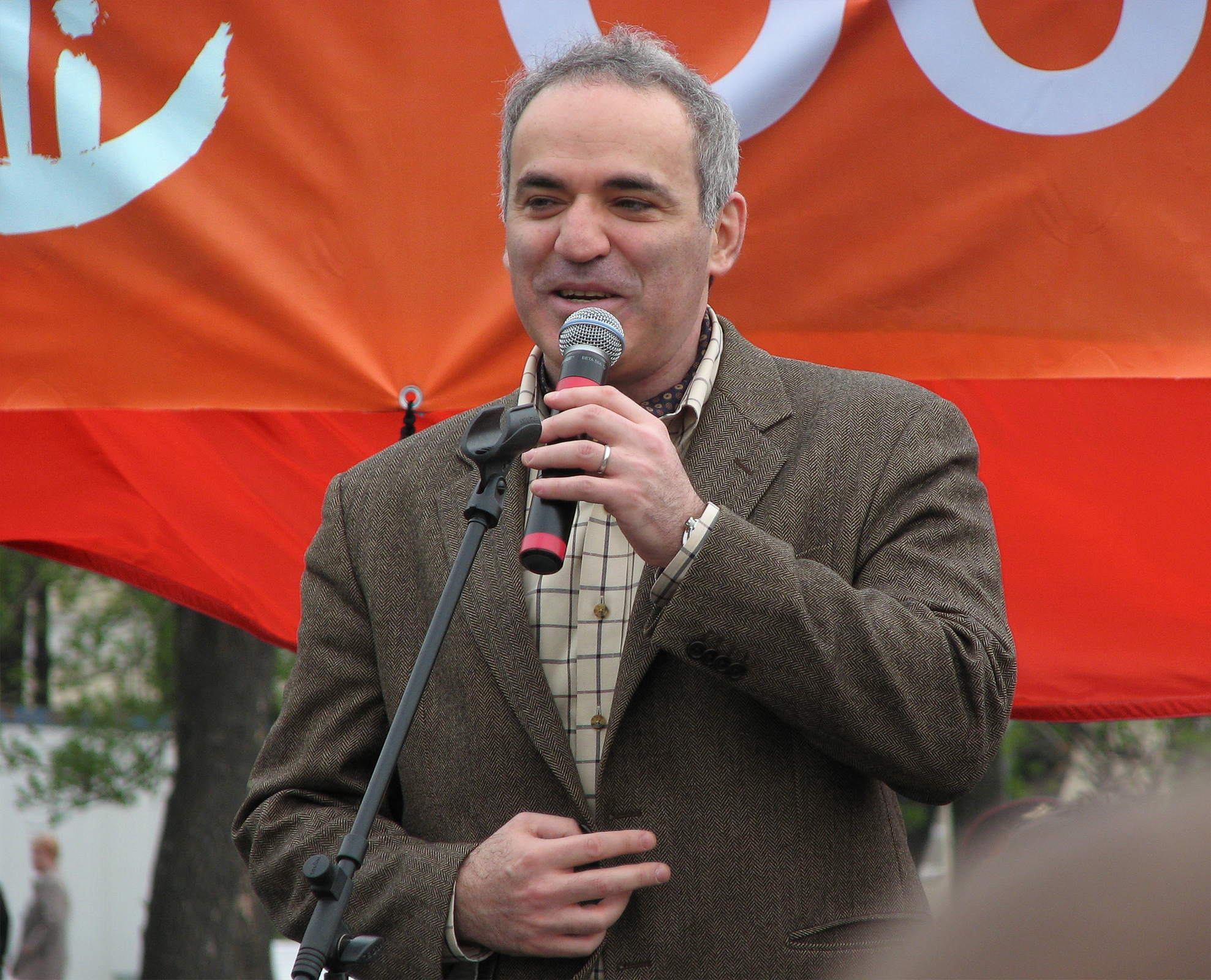
Garry Kasparov at a "Russia without Putin" event in 2010

The UCF participated in the organisation of almost all the Dissenters Marches.

One member of the Murmansk branch of the United Civil Front, Larisa Arap, is believed to be victim of psychiatric abuse.

In 2010 UCF activists held pickets in Moscow to support the Internet campaign Putin must go.
