= Galina Starovoytova =

Russian academic and politician (1946-1998)

- Галина Старовойтова
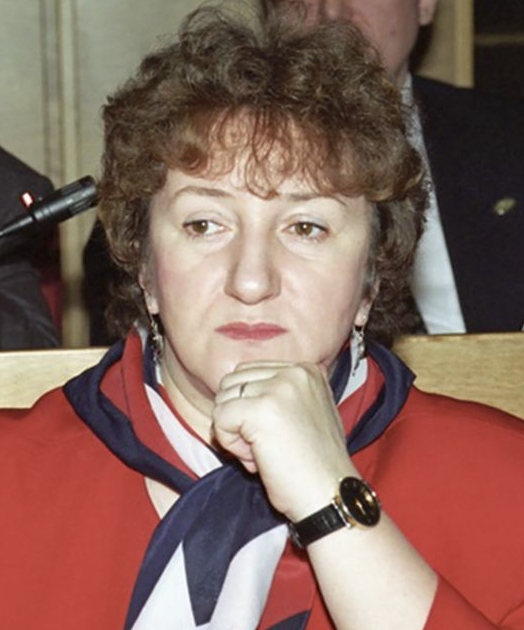
- Starovoytova in 1996
- Born: Galina Vasilyevna Starovoitova; 17 May 1946; Chelyabinsk, Russian SFSR, Soviet Union
- Died: 20 November 1998 (aged 52); Saint Petersburg, Russian Federation
- Cause of death: Murder by shooting
- Education: Leningrad College of Military Engineering; Leningrad University; Institute of Anthropology and Ethnography
- Known for: human rights activism with participation in the Moscow Helsinki Group
- Awards: Commander's Grand Crosses of the Order of the Cross of Vytis

Galina Vasilyevna Starovoitova (Russian: Гали́на Васи́льевна Старово́йтова; 17 May 1946 – 20 November 1998) was a Soviet dissident, Russian politician and ethnographer known for her work to protect ethnic minorities and promote democratic reforms in Russia. She was murdered in 1998.

== Early life and academic career ==
Galina Vasilyevna Starovoitova was born in the Ural Mountains city of Chelyabinsk on 17 May 1946 to a Belarusian father and a Russian mother. She earned an undergraduate degree from the Leningrad College of Military Engineering in 1966 and an MA in social psychology from Leningrad University in 1971. In 1980, she earned a doctorate in social anthropology from the Institute of Ethnography, USSR Academy of Sciences, where she worked for seventeen years. She conducted PhD research at the end of the 1970s, focusing on a sensitive topic at that period, specifically on the role of ethnic groups in Soviet cities. The data of her study were drawn mainly from Leningrad. Her PhD thesis, published in 1987, was a study of the Tatars of Leningrad. She also published extensively on anthropological theory, cross-cultural studies, and Caucasian anthropology—with fieldwork notably in the areas of Nagorno-Karabakh and Abkhazia. In early 1988, after the birth of the Armenian national-democratic movement, she became a supporter of the self-determination of the Nagorno-Karabakh region. In December 1988, she accompanied Academician Andrei Sakharov on a fateful trip to Armenia, Azerbaijan and the Karabakh region in an attempt at mediation and reconciliation. From 1994 to 1998, she was a visiting professor at the Watson Institute for International Studies of Brown University in Providence, Rhode Island, lecturing on the politics of self-determination for ethnic minorities.

== Political career ==
Galina Starovoitova began her political career in 1989, when she was elected as a representative to the Congress of People's Deputies of the Soviet Union from Armenia. In the USSR Congress, she became a member of the reformist faction, the Inter-Regional Group of People's Deputies, which was led by Sakharov and included other notables such as Yuri Shchekochikhin, Sergei Yushenkov, and Boris Yeltsin. In the Congress, her work centered mostly around nationalities' problems, plans for the new federation, and the drafting of a new Soviet constitution. She also advocated for the Armenians in Nagorno-Karabakh during the Armenian-Azerbaijani conflict. In June 1990, Starovoitova also won a seat in the new RSFSR Congress of People's Deputies (Russian Federation) from Leningrad (now St. Petersburg), where she served until the dissolution of the Congress in September 1993. As with the USSR parliament, she won her seat in the Russian parliament by a landslide over a competing slate of male candidates.

In the summer of 1991, Starovoitova served as spokesperson for Yeltsin in his successful campaign for the presidency of the Russian Federation. At that time, Starovoitova had been promoted by several democratic forces for the post of either vice president or minister of defense. Instead, she became presidential advisor on interethnic issues until the end of 1992, when she was dismissed by Yeltsin apparently under pressure from conservative elements for criticizing Moscow's support for Ossetians in their ethnic cleansing campaign against the Ingush in the North Caucasus.

Before re-launching her legislative career in 1995, Starovoitova spent her time at the Institute for the Economy in Transition in Moscow, as co-chair of the Democratic Russia Movement, and as a fellow in the Washington-based United States Institute of Peace. With former political prisoner Sergei Grigoryants, and funding from George Soros, she co-organized a series of international conferences in Moscow in the mid-1990s around the theme "The KGB: Yesterday, Today, Tomorrow".

In 1995, she was elected to the Russian State Duma from the political movement "Democratic Russia - Free Workers Union". The movement was led by her and two prominent members of the Moscow Helsinki Group: Lev Ponomarev and the dissident Orthodox priest Gleb Yakunin.

Galina Starovoitova was a strong defender of ethnic minorities. She said, "If in accordance with international standards we recognize the rights of nations to self-determination, we must recognize it also within Russia." Together with Sergei Kovalev and others she negotiated with Dzhokhar Dudaev in attempt to prevent the First Chechen War. They convinced Dudaev to sign a protocol where he agreed to withdraw his demands for immediate Chechen independence and begin official negotiations, according to another Duma member Valery Borschov. Sergei Stepashin, then FSK director, and others convinced Yeltsin that military operations were necessary and would be very quick and successful. When the war began, Starovoitova called Yeltsin "Boris the Bloody" and said: "The historic time of Yeltsin the reformer has passed, and his new regime can turn out to be dangerous not just for Russia".

She was an editorial board member of Demokratizatsiya: The Journal of Post-Soviet Democratization, a peer-reviewed scholarly journal published in cooperation with the American University and Moscow State University.

Over the years, Galina Starovoitova attended numerous international meetings and discussions, where she had conversations with world leaders including Margaret Thatcher, Jacques Chirac, Václav Havel, Henry Kissinger and Lech Wałęsa.

Starovoitova was strongly against the omnipresence of security services in Russia and believed that lustration was necessary but none of the other elected representatives supported her. Starovoitova has drafted a law on lustration and presented it to the Duma at least 5 times. Her subsequent murder has been linked by some to her work towards making lustration a law in Russia and her opposition to revanche of KGB into power. She said, "I propose a decision to order a medical examination of deputies of the State Duma, especially in the light of yesterday's voting on the battle against anti-semitism, when many of our colleagues gave us reason to doubt their mental health".

In April 1998, she became the leader of "Democratic Russia", then registered as an official party, in order to prepare for State Duma elections that were to be held in December 1999. State security people took the post of Prime Minister in succession at the time. Cabinet of GRU-connected Sergei Kiriyenko was replaced in August 1998 by cabinet of SVR veteran Yevgeny Primakov. New leadership also came to the state security services as Vladimir Putin was appointed as head of FSB in July 1998. Galina Starovoitova tried to prevent such people from coming to power using her personal connections with different political figures and with Yeltsin's wife, according to Valeriy Borschov.

Starovoitova opposed the broad mandate of FSB. She made this part of her political platform in "Democratic Russia". She voted against nominating Yevgeny Primakov for Prime Minister.

== Death ==
Starovoitova was shot dead in the entryway of her apartment building in St. Petersburg on 20 November 1998. Her aide, Ruslan Linkov, was wounded in the attack. The murder investigation took place under the personal control of Interior Minister Sergei Stepashin, a prominent member of the pro-Western Yabloko party, former reformist FSB boss under Yeltsin and future Prime Minister of Russia. In June 2005, two hitmen, Yuri Kolchin and Vitali Akishin, were convicted of murder and sentenced to 20 and 23 years of imprisonment respectively. Akishin was named as the one who pulled the trigger and Kolchin as one who had organized the attack. On 28 September 2006, Vyacheslav Lelyavin was sentenced to 11 years in prison for his role in organizing the murder. Sergey Musin, Oleg Fedosov and Igor Bogdanov are still wanted for the investigation.

According to official investigation, the murder was organized by former GRU hitman Yuri Kolchin. However, the people who ordered this assassination and paid for it have never been found. Valeria Novodvorskaya claimed that the Russian state security services murdered Starovoytova to eliminate her influence on Boris Yeltsin and her resistance in appointing former KGB general Yevgeny Primakov as Prime Minister of Russia. Novodvorskaya suggested that FSB general Viktor Cherkesov accompanied Starovoitova just before the murder because he knew that she was due to be killed.

== Award and tomb ==
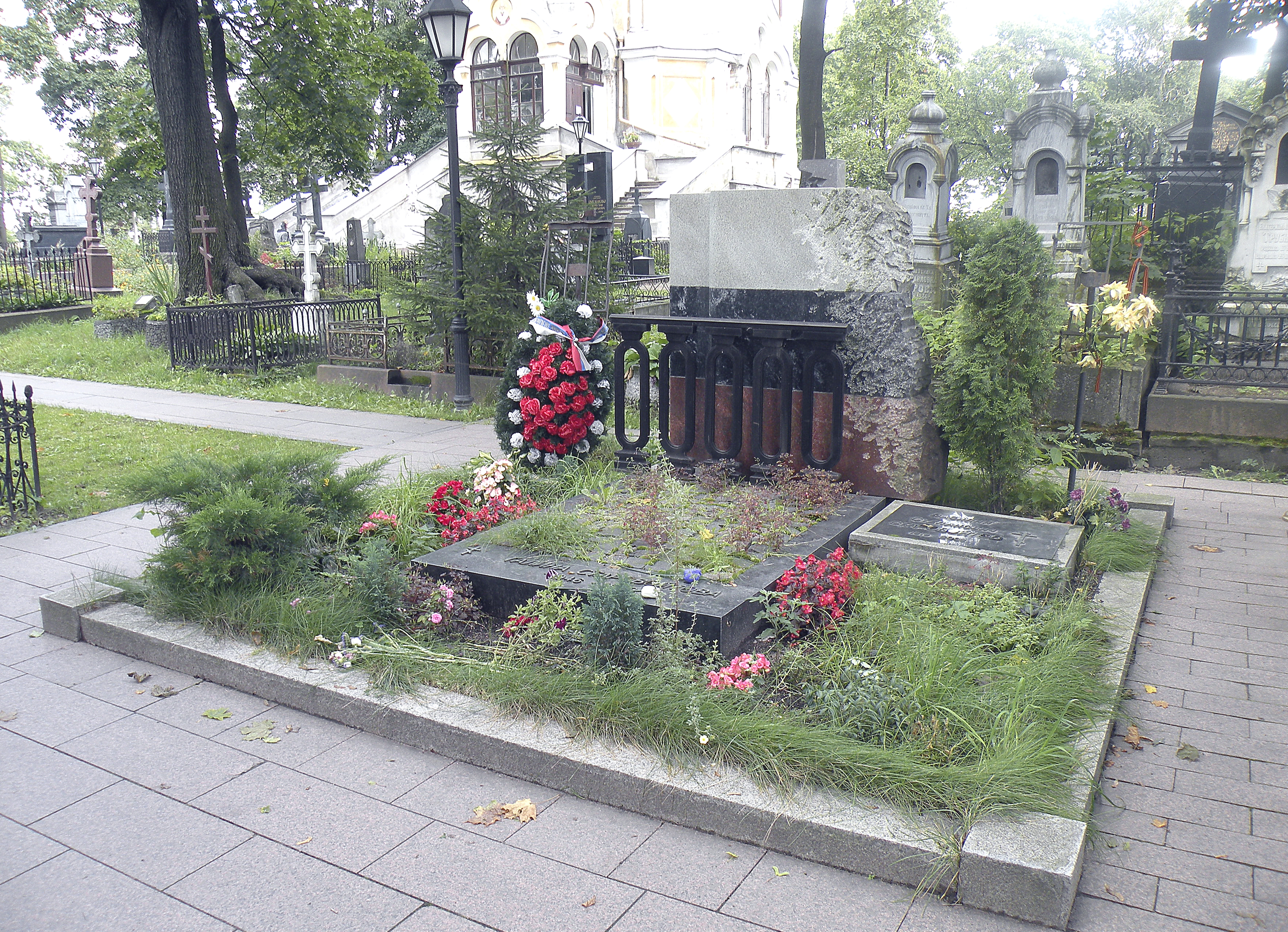
The headstone on Starovoytova's tomb at the Nikolskoye Cemetery of the Alexander Nevsky Lavra in Saint Petersburg, 2009

Shortly before her death, Galina Starovoitova established an award "for contributions to the protection of human rights and consolidation of democracy in Russia".

The award was sponsored by Irina Thomason and the Fund for the Protection of the Rights of Children and Women. The recipients so far have been:

- Gleb Yakunin, a Russian Orthodox priest
- Moscow Helsinki Group founder Larisa Bogoraz
- Former St. Petersburg Mayor Anatoly Sobchak,
- The Soldiers' Mothers of St. Petersburg
- Former deputy of the State Duma, Yuli Rybakov
- Leader of the Democratic Union, Valeria Novodvorskaya.

Starovoitova was buried in a prominent tomb (pictured here in 2009) in the Nikolskoe Cemetery at the Alexander Nevsky Lavra in St. Petersburg. The monument depicts a tattered Russian flag and purportedly uses the pavement from where she was assassinated to cover the grave.

== See also ==
- List of unsolved murders (1980–1999)
- List of members of the State Duma of Russia who died in office
