= Marina Salye =

Russian politician (1934–2012)

- Марина Салье
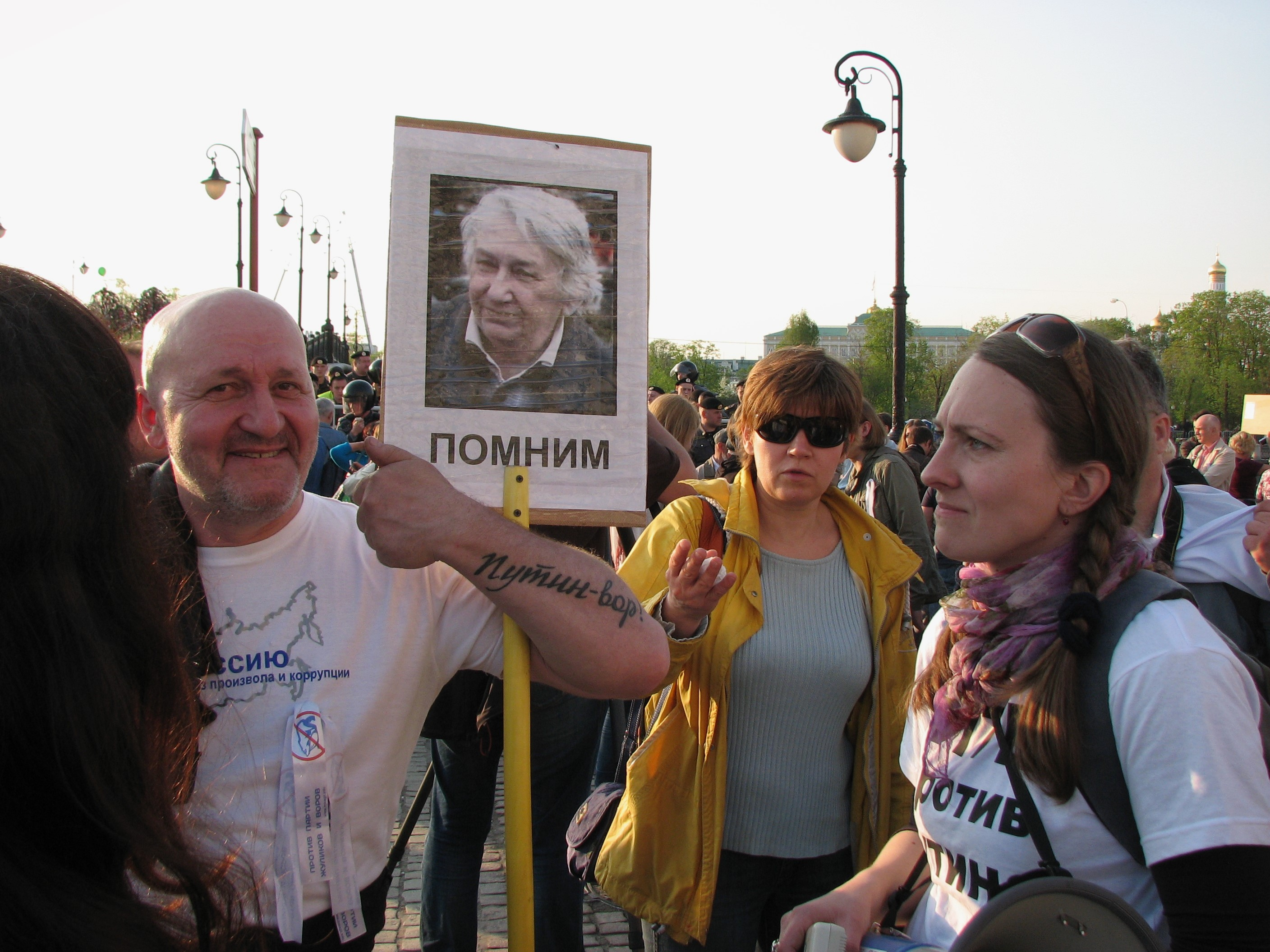
- A portrait of Salye during the 2012 protests following the 2011 Russian elections
- Born: 19 October 1934; Leningrad, Soviet Union
- Died: 21 March 2012 (aged 77); Ostrov, Russia
- Resting place: Serafimovskoe Cemetery
- Political party: PARNAS (2012)
- Other political affiliations: Leningrad People's Front (1989-1990)

Marina Yevgenyevna Salye (Russian: Мари́на Евге́ньевна Салье́; 19 October 1934 – 21 March 2012) was a Russian geologist and politician, being the former deputy of the legislative assembly of Leningrad (renamed St. Petersburg on 6 September 1991). She was also a people's deputy in the Congress of People's Deputies of the RSFSR until September 1993, when the congress was dissolved. Salye was one of the leaders of the radical pro-reform group called Radical Democrats.

Salye was known as an engaging leader and to have been first to accuse Vladimir Putin of corruption, during her tenure with the Legislative Assembly of Saint Petersburg in the mid-1990s. In March 2010 Salye signed the online anti-Putin manifesto of the Russian opposition "Putin must go". Shortly before her death in March 2012, she had also joined the People's Freedom Party. She claimed that the years 1990–93 Lensovet members found that Vladimir Churov, head of the Russian election committee, and Igor Artemyev, head of the Antimonopoly service, worked for the KGB.

== Early life ==
Salye was born into a distinguished St. Petersburg family, and her great-great-grandfather was a watchmaker to the tsar. She earned a doctorate of geology and became a research scientist at Leningrad's Institute of Geology until 1990. She studied rocks across the Soviet Union, but during Mikhail Gorbachev's attempted political openness, or glasnost, in the late 1980s, Salye rose as a leader of a new group of democratic activists.

== Political career ==
In 1988-1990, Salye was one of the leaders of Leningrad People's Front (LNF), one of the largest and most pro-perestroika local political clubs in the country. She also co-founded Inter-Regional Association of Democratic Organizations (MADO), a national association of groups in support of the Inter-Regional Deputies Group that was led in the USSR Congress of People's Deputies by Boris Yeltsin, Andrei Sakharov, and others. In 1990, she was elected to Russia's legislature and co-founded, with Lev Ponomarev, the Free Democratic Party of Russia (SvDPR), which, in turn, became a founding member organization of the Democratic Russia Movement. Salye was prominent on the radical flank of this movement and in 1991-92 joined forces with Yury Afanasyev and his followers in calling for the movement to take a more critical stance toward the Yeltsin administration and the mayors of Moscow and St.Petersburg in their pursuit of rapid neoliberal market reforms and shadow privatization of industries. They also called for the convocation of a national Constituent Assembly to replace both Yeltsin and the legislature. Even though in January 1992 both Afanasyev and Salye were elected co-chairs of Democratic Russia's Coordinating Council, they ended up in a minority and soon resigned from their positions within the movement. Salye created her own organization and a coalition around it to advocate for a Constituent Assembly, but these efforts were neutralized by the Yeltsin administration, including though its own constitutional consultative assembly and the eventual imposition of a new constitution via referendum in 1993. Salye and her party, SvDPR, were unable to participate in the elections to the newly created legislature. In 1995, she was one of the leading candidates on a slate led by then-Governor elect of the Sverdlovsk Region, Eduard Rossel, which failed to gain seats in the Duma.

In March 2010 Salye gave an interview to Radio Liberty. Over time she had written some memoirs and completed a large portion of them. The memoirs are based on an archive of documents containing illegal decisions of the city administration including Vladimir Putin.

== Salye investigatory commission ==
In 1992, Salye headed a special commission in St. Petersburg, which found that on the basis of documents signed by Vladimir Putin, then chairman of the city's Foreign Relations Committee, and his deputy, the city had exported rare earth metals, oil products, and other raw materials for over 100 million dollars. These were barter contracts. In return, the city, where there were food shortages, should have received deliveries of foodstuffs, but the foodstuffs never materialised. Salye suspected that Putin and his deputy had granted the export permits to companies that disappeared after receiving the materials. Putin denied that he did anything wrong and that the companies were to blame. Salye began an inquiry into the misappropriation that was approved by the city council for prosecutors to investigate Putin. The investigation was stopped by the mayor, Anatoly Sobchak, who was a mentor of Putin.

After the investigation was dismissed, Salye concentrated her efforts on liberal causes. She spoke out in the media against Putin's candidacy in the presidential elections of 2000 and endorsed Konstantin Titov. After Putin's victory she moved to a remote village and did not speak to journalists for 10 years. The village was located in the Pskov region and she rarely returned to St. Petersburg. It is speculated that she assumed the traditions of a Russian rural exile. In interviews, Salye feared Putin's power and her friends' mysterious deaths.

== Personal life ==
Salye was known to have lived with a female partner whom she called her "sister". Salye's partner followed her to exile shortly after Putin's election as president in 2000.

She died from a heart attack on 21 March 2012.

== Honours and awards ==
- Jubilee Medal "50 Years of Victory in the Great Patriotic War 1941-1945"
- Jubilee Medal "60 Years of Victory in the Great Patriotic War 1941-1945"
- Jubilee Medal "65 Years of Victory in the Great Patriotic War 1941-1945"
- Medal "In Commemoration of the 300th Anniversary of Saint Petersburg"
- Medal "In Commemoration of the 250th Anniversary of Leningrad"
- Commemorative decoration "Citizen of the siege of Leningrad"
