= Choice of Russia =

Choice of Russia:

- Choice of Russia (electoral bloc), a bloc founded in 1993 and headed by Prime Minister Yegor Gaidar
  - Democratic Choice of Russia, a political party
  - Democratic Choice of Russia – United Democrats, a bloc founded before Russian legislative election of 1995
- Choice of Russia (parliamentary group), a liberal political group of State Duma in 1993-1996 headed by Yegor Gaidar
- Choice of Russia (political movement), an organization founded in 1993 and headed by Vladimir Ryzhkov

== See also ==
- Democratic Party of Russia
- Democratic Russia
