= 1989 Soviet Union legislative election =

- 26 March 1989 (first round) 2 April–23 May 1989 (runoffs)

All 2,250 seats in the Congress of People's Deputies 1,126 seats needed for a majority
- Turnout: 89.8%
	First party	Second party
		Ind
Leader	Mikhail Gorbachev
Party	CPSU	Independents
Seats won	1958	292
- Results by Republic: CPSU: 60–70% 70–80% 80–90% 90–100% 100% Independent: 50–60% 60–70% 70–80%
Chairman of the Council of Ministers before election
Nikolai Ryzhkov
CPSU
Elected Chairman of the Council of Ministers
Nikolai Ryzhkov
CPSU

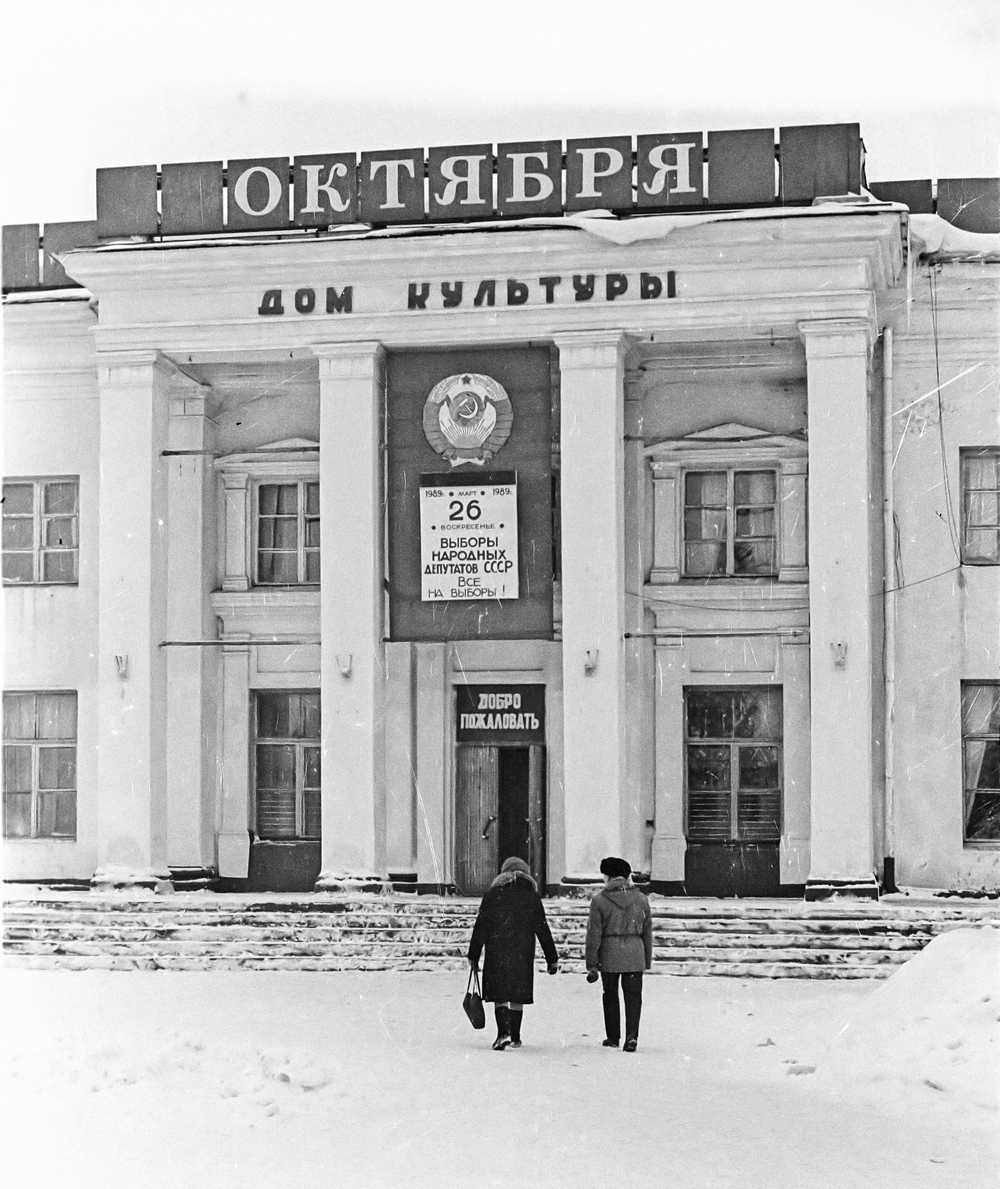
Culture Hall is prepared for legislative election in Pereslavl

Legislative elections were held in the Soviet Union on 26 March 1989 to elect members of the Congress of People's Deputies, with run-offs on 2, 9 and 20 April and 14 and 23 May. They were the first partially free nationwide elections held in the Soviet Union, and would be the last national elections held in that country before its dissolution in 1991. The elections were followed by regional elections in 1990, which would be the last regional elections to take place in the country.

== Background ==
In January 1987 Communist Party (CPSU) General Secretary Mikhail Gorbachev announced the new policy of demokratizatsiya (democratization). Under this concept the electorate would have a choice between multiple candidates per constituency, although CPSU would effectively remain the ruling party (in the absence of other parties). The concept was introduced by Gorbachev to enable him to circumvent the CPSU hardliners who resisted his perestroika and glasnost reform campaigns, while still maintaining the Soviet Union as a one-party communist state.

== Electoral system ==
In December 1988 the 1977 Soviet Constitution was amended to create a new legislative body, the Congress of People's Deputies, which replaced the old Supreme Soviet of the Soviet Union as the highest organ of state power. The Congress of People's Deputies consisted of 2,250 deputies, who would elect a 542-member Supreme Soviet from among its members to serve as the "working" parliament.

The 2,250 members of the CPD consisted of:

- 1,500 directly elected from single-member constituencies by the two-round system.
- 750 reserved for public bodies.

The 1,500 members directly elected consisted of:

- 750 were elected by "Territorial Districts" of equal population.
- 750 were elected by "National Territorial Districts" based on republics and autonomous regions irrelevant of population (32 from each Soviet Socialist Republic, 11 from each Autonomous Soviet Socialist Republic, 5 from each Autonomous Oblast and 1 from each Autonomous Okrug). Voters had two ballots, one for their Territorial District and one for their National Territorial District.

The 750 members reserved for public bodies consisted of:

- 100 were elected by the All-Union Central Council of Trade Unions.
- 100 were elected by the CPSU.
- 75 were elected by the Committee of Soviet Women.
- 75 were elected by Komsomol.
- 75 were elected by the Academy of Sciences, the All-Union Voluntary Temperance Society, artistic unions and collective farm associations.
- 325 were elected by other bodies.

== Campaign ==
Candidates were required to be nominated by organisations and had to be supported at a meeting of at least 500 voters. This was followed by a caucus meeting, at which candidates had to receive support from at least 50% of those present, before proceeding to the final stage, where they had to be approved by district electoral assemblies formed by worker collectives.

A total of 7,531 candidates nominated themselves for the directly elected seats, of which 5,074 were registered to contest the elections, around 90% of which were CPSU members. Amongst those blocked from standing were Boris Nemtsov, who had attempted to run in Nizhegorodsky District 158 in Gorky. 399 constituencies had only one candidate. Around 85% of candidates were CPSU members.

The 750 reserved seats were contested by 880 candidates.

== Results ==
Voter turnout by republic: >95% 90–95% 85–90% 80–85% 70–75%

Of the 1,500 directly elected seats, 1,226 were won in the first round. Voter turnout was 89.8% overall, with around 172,840,130 voters voting from the 192,575,165 registered. Turnout ranged from 71.9% in the Armenian SSR to 98.5% in the Azerbaijan SSR. Of the 274 remaining seats, 76 went to a second round on 2 and 9 April while voting in 198 had to be repeated due voter turnout being below 50%, with repeat voting on 20 April, 14 May and 23 May. Around 162 million people voted in the contests for the 750 reserved seats, a turnout of 84%. Repeat elections were required for five reserved seats.

Although the CPSU candidates won 87% of the seats, 38 CPSU regional secretaries lost in their constitutencies. Yuri Soloyov, head of the CPSU in Leningrad lost despite being the only candidate, as did leader of Kyiv City Council Valentyn Zghursky. In the Lithuanian SSR the nationalist popular front won around three-quarters of the seats, while in the Estonian SSR the Popular Front won around half the seats and in Latvian SSR Popular Front of Latvia won 40 of the 56 seats.

Among the dissidents elected were Boris Yeltsin, who won over the CPSU-endorsed candidate to represent Moscow's district with 89% of the vote. It was Yeltsin's first return to political power after resigning from the Politburo in 1987. On a union republic level Yeltsin was also later elected to the RSFSR's Congress and then, indirectly, to its Supreme Soviet. Anti-corruption prosecutor Telman Gdlyan, trapeze artist Valentin Dikul, ethnographer Galina Starovoytova, lawyer Anatoly Sobchak, physicist Andrei Sakharov, weightlifter Yury Vlasov, and hockey player Anatoli Firsov were among the other non-endorsed candidates who were elected to the CPD.

All in all, while the majority of seats were won by endorsed candidates, one Politburo member, five Central Committee members lost re-election to non-endorsed candidates. Gorbachev hailed the elections as a victory for perestroika and the election was praised in state media such as TASS and Izvestia, despite the strong opposition of hardliners within the Politburo and Central Committee.

Party	Votes	%	Seats
Communist Party of the Soviet Union			1,958
Independents			292
Total			2,250
Total votes	172,840,130	–	
Registered voters/turnout	192,575,165	89.75	
Source: Izvestia

== Aftermath ==
The first session of the new Congress of People's Deputies opened on 25 May 1989. Although hardliners retained control of the chamber, the reformers used the legislature as a platform to debate and criticize the Soviet system, with the state media broadcasting their comments live and uncensored on television. Yeltsin managed to secure a seat on the working Supreme Soviet, which was elected in the first session on 25 May and met for the first time on 3 June. and in the summer formed the first opposition, the Inter-Regional Deputies Group, formed of Russian nationalists and liberals. As it was the final legislative group in the Soviet Union, those elected in 1989 played a vital part in continuing reforms and the eventual fall of the Soviet Union two years later.
