= 1990 Soviet Union regional elections =

Regional elections in the Soviet Union

In 1990, elections were held for the Congress of People's Deputies of Russia and the Supreme Soviets of 14 other republics of the Soviet Union.

== Background ==
The proposal to create a "two-story" system for the formation of the legislative branch (with a directly-elected Congress of People's Deputies and a Supreme Soviet elected by the Congress of People's Deputies) in the USSR and its constituent and autonomous republics was put forward by Mikhail Gorbachev at the 19th Conference of the Communist Party in summer of 1988. On 1 December, the corresponding changes were made to the Constitution of the USSR.

Most of the republics except for Russia and its autonomous region of Dagestan ignored this requirement of the Union Constitution. Under the constitutional reform of 1989–90, they retained direct elections to their Supreme Soviets, but unlike the campaigns of preceding 50 years, republican branches of the CPSU now were facing significant opposition from the nationalist forces, represented in organizations such as Lithuania's Sąjūdis and numerous "Popular Fronts" (Estonia, Latvia, Moldavia, Azerbaijan).

== List ==
Republic	Date	Communist Party	Result	Opposition Parties	Result	Independents
Armenia	20 May	Communist Party of Armenia	136 / 259	–		123 / 259
Azerbaijan	30 September	Azerbaijan Communist Party	280 / 360	Azerbaijani Popular Front	45 / 360	15 / 360
Byelorussia	4 March	Communist Party of Byelorussia	302 / 360	Belarusian Popular Front	26 / 360	–
Estonia	18 March	Communist Party of Estonia	27 / 105	Popular Front of Estonia	43 / 105	10 / 105
Estonia	18 March	Communist Party of Estonia	27 / 105	Joint Soviet of Work Collectives	25 / 105	10 / 105
Georgia	28 October	Communist Party of Georgia	64 / 250	Round Table—Free Georgia	155 / 250	9 / 250
Georgia	28 October	Communist Party of Georgia	64 / 250	People's Front	12 / 250	9 / 250
Georgia	28 October	Communist Party of Georgia	64 / 250	Democratic Georgia Bloc	4 / 250	9 / 250
Georgia	28 October	Communist Party of Georgia	64 / 250	All-Georgian Rustaveli Society	1 / 250	9 / 250
Georgia	28 October	Communist Party of Georgia	64 / 250	Liberation and Economic Revival Bloc	1 / 250	9 / 250
Kazakhstan	25 March	Communist Party of Kazakhstan	342 / 360	–		18 / 360
Kirghizia	25 February	Communist Party of Kirghizia	315 / 350	–		35 / 350
Latvia	18 March	Communist Party of Latvia	55 / 201	Popular Front of Latvia	131 / 201	15 / 201
Lithuania (Note: In December 1989, majority of the Communist Party of Lithuania led by Brazauskas proclaimed it separate from the CPSU. Burokevičius headed pro-Union branch.)	24 February	Communist Party of Lithuania (CPSU)	7 / 141	Lithuanian Social-Democratic Party	9 / 141	64 / 141
Lithuania	24 February	Communist Party of Lithuania (CPSU)	7 / 141	Lithuanian Green Party	4 / 141	64 / 141
Lithuania	24 February	Communist Party of Lithuania (independent)	46 / 141	Lithuanian Democratic Party	3 / 141	64 / 141
Lithuania	24 February	Communist Party of Lithuania (independent)	46 / 141	Lithuanian Christian Democratic Party	2 / 141	64 / 141
Lithuania	24 February	Endorsed by Sąjūdis (Note: The leading Sąjūdis opposition movement in Lithuania did not formerly run as a political party, but rather endorsed individual candidates of other parties, primarily independents and members of the independent branch of the Communist Party)			91 / 141	
Moldavia	February–March	Communist Party of Moldavia	177 / 380	Popular Front of Moldova	101 / 380	102 / 380
Russia	4 March	CPSU (Note: Since the creation of the Soviet Union, Russia was the only constituent republic without its own Communist Party. The short-lived CP RSFSR would be created three months after the 1990 election.)	920 / 1,068	–		148 / 1,068
Russia	4 March	Endorsed by Democratic Russia (Note: The opposition Democratic Russia movement did not run as a political party, but rather endorsed certain Communist Party and independent candidates)			350 / 1,068	
Tajikistan	25 February	Communist Party of Tajikistan	221 / 230	–		9 / 230
Turkmenistan	7 January	Communist Party of Turkmenistan	157 / 175	–		18 / 175
Ukraine	4 March	Communist Party of Ukraine	331 / 450	Democratic Bloc	111 / 450	–
Uzbekistan	18 February	Communist Party of Uzbekistan	456 / 500	Unity	40 / 500	4 / 500

== See also ==
- 1989 Soviet Union legislative election
- Demokratizatsiya
