= Farewell, Unwashed Russia =

1841 poem by Mikhail Lermontov

- by Mikhail Lermontov
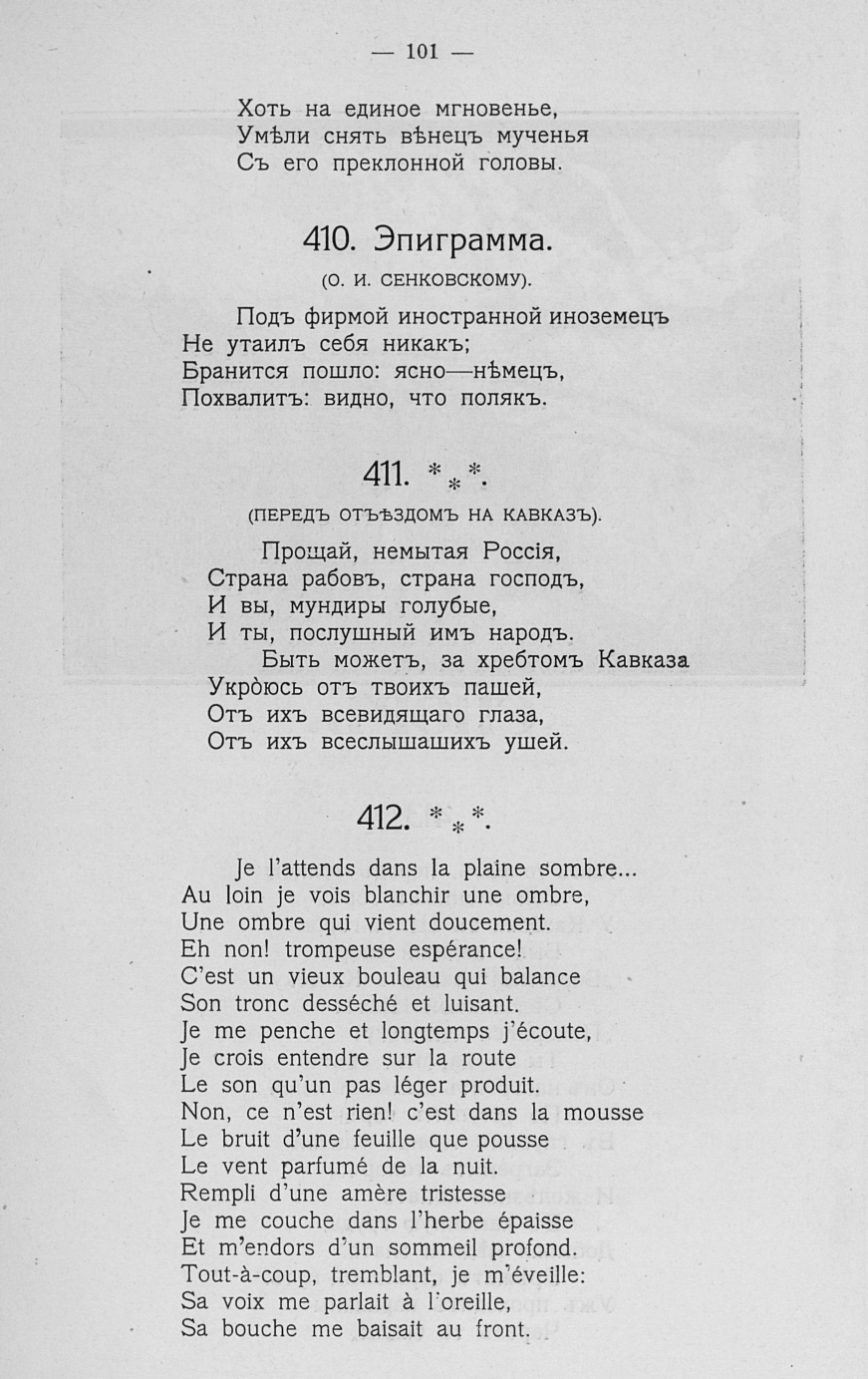
- Original title: Прощай, немытая Россiя
- Translator: Anatoly Liberman
- Written: April 1841; 184 years ago
- First published in: Russkaya Starina
- Country: Russia
- Language: Russian
- Genre(s): Invective
- Form: Lyric poetry
- Meter: Iambic tetrameter
- Rhyme scheme: ABAB
- Publisher: Pavel Viskovatov
- Publication date: 1887; 138 years ago
- Lines: 8
- Pages: 738—739

Full text
- "Farewell, Farewell, Unwashed Russia" at Wikisource

Farewell, Unwashed Russia (Russian: Прощай, немытая Россiя, romanized: Proshchay, nemytaya Rossiya) is a poem by Mikhail Lermontov, written in connection with his last exile from Russian capital cities. The poem was not published by the author himself, as well as Lermontov did not put his autograph on it, the first mention of it appeared 32 years after the author's death, which caused a controversy around authorship.

== Text ==
Third publication and its literal translation:

Прощай, немытая Россiя,
Страна рабовъ, страна господъ,
И вы, мундиры голубые,
И ты, имъ преданный народъ.

Быть можетъ, за стѣной Кавказа
Сокроюсь отъ твоихъ пашей,
Отъ ихъ всевидящаго глаза,
Отъ ихъ всеслышащихъ ушей.

—Published by Russky Arkhiv. Historical and literary collection (1890)

Farewell, unwashed Russia,
Land of slaves, land of masters,
And you, blue uniforms,
And you, people, devoted to them.

Perhaps beyond the wall of the Caucasus,
I will hide from your pashas,
From their all-seeing eye,
From their all-hearing ears.

—Anatoly Liberman

The poem is written in the genre of political invective and aimed at people in "blue uniforms" and "people, devoted to them". "Blue uniforms" is metonymy used to refer to the Russian Special Corps of Gendarmes.

The text in the third publication is probably the most original version of the poem. The text in the first and second publications is identical, but is different in comparison with the third publication. Instead of "стѣной, stenoy, 'wall'" it says "хребтомъ, hrebtom, 'ridge'" and instead of "пашей, pashey, 'pashas'" it says "вождей, vozhdey, 'overlords'. There are also variants with "послушный, poslushny, 'obedient'" or "покорный, pokorny, 'submissive'" instead of "devoted" and "царей, tsarey, 'tsars'" instead of "pashas". The poem criticizes the lack of freedom in Russia and calls the tsarist servants pashas, pointing to the Turkish, despotic nature of life in Russia.

== History ==
The poem was written in April 1841, when Lermontov was exiled to the Caucasus from St. Petersburg. However, it was first mentioned only on March 9, 1873 in a letter from Pyotr Bartenev to Pyotr Efremov and first published in 1887 in the journal Russkaya Starina by Pavel Viskatov.

In the 20th century, the poem received a rise in popularity. A number of literary critics have expressed doubts about the authorship of the poem. Philologists note inconsistencies in the text, as Lermontov allegedly "hid behind the wall of the Caucasus," although he was sent to the North Caucasus, which means he did not cross its ridge. Members of the Russian Humanitarian Science Foundation are skeptical about Lermontov's authorship. In 2017, an international round table dedicated to the issue of authorship was assembled, which included more than twenty leading Lermontovedians. As a result of the round table, a resolution was adopted that confirmed the authorship.

== Reception and use ==
The poem is included in the Russian school curriculum.

In 1890, Vladimir Korolenko, speaking about the poem, wrote: "Bright and strong. Lermontov knew how to feel like a free man, he knew how to portray these feelings. In our time, this is already an anachronism, this does not happen anymore! ... Now, even behind the wall of the Caucasus, you can't hide from the all-seeing eyes!" Larissa Volpert said that the poem is "the pinnacle of Lermontov's political lyrics".

Russian politician and historian Yuri Afanasyev:

Our great poet Mikhail Lermontov, who was exiled to the then war with Chechnya (in 1840), wrote when he left for the army: 'Farewell, unwashed Russia.' Isn't it a very figurative and accurate description of the state of 'universal slavery'? Especially considering that the 'blue uniforms' were worn by the ranks of the Gendarme Corps, the forerunner of the Russian secret police (later the tsarist security departments of the Ministry of Internal Affairs, even later the Cheka, the KGB and their current heirs).

References to the poem were made by various Russian composers. The line "Farewell, unwashed Russia" is used in Nikolay Kolyada's play "Oginsky's Polonaise" (Russian: Полонез Огинского). Zelimkhan Yandarbiyev in his 1995 article writes: "You were unwashed, and remain unwashed" referring to the first verse of the poem.

In 2017, the poem was quoted by the then President of Ukraine, Petro Poroshenko.
