= 1990 Russian Supreme Soviet election =

- 4 March 1990 (first round); 14–18 March 1990 (second round)

All 1068 seats to the Congress of People's Deputies 535 seats needed for a majority
- Turnout: 76.4% (first round, ▼23.57 pp); 65.8% (second round)

	First party	Second party
Leader	Mikhail Gorbachev	Boris Yeltsin (main)
Party	CPSU	Other candidates (Democrats, nationalists, independents et cetera)
Leader since	11 March 1985	29 July 1989
Seats won	920 (Note: Although 920 of the elected members were members of the CPSU, around 350 of those elected (CPSU or independents) were deemed to be in the democratic bloc and supportive of the Democratic Russia programme)	148
- Election turnout by region: 60–70% 70–80% 80–90% >90%
Chairman of the Supreme Soviet before election
Nikolai Gribachev
CPSU
Elected Chairman of the Supreme Soviet
Boris Yeltsin
CPSU (Note: Boris Yeltsin was elected as a member of the CPSU. In the elections for Chairman of the Supreme Soviet, he was nominated by the Democratic Russia electoral bloc against the CPSU candidates. Yeltsin left the CPSU at the 28th Congress on 12 July 1990.)
Premier before election
Aleksandr Vlasov
Elected Premier
Ivan Silayev

Legislative elections were held in the Russian SFSR in March 1990 as part of the regional elections across the Soviet Union. The first round was held on 4 March, and the second round on 14, 17 and 18 March. Members of the Communist Party of the Soviet Union (CPSU) won 920 of the 1,068 seats, although several were supporters of the Democratic Russia movement.

They were the first and only free elections to the Congress of People's Deputies of the RSFSR. The legislature became the Congress of People's Deputies of the Russian Federation after the dissolution of the Soviet Union, and was dissolved by Yeltsin in October 1993 during the constitutional crisis of 1993 and replaced by the Federal Assembly.

== Electoral system ==
The electoral system was changed following criticism of the 1989 Soviet Union legislative election. The seats for social organisations were abolished and candidate nomination criteria were relaxed, with the local electoral commission screening stage scrapped.

The elections were held using the two-round system; to be elected in the first round, a candidate had to receive over 50% of the vote and voter turnout be at least 50%. Of the 1,068 seats in the Congress of People's Deputies, 900 were elected in territorial constituencies and 168 in national-territorial constituencies (84 from krais, oblasts and the cities of Leningrad and Moscow, 64 from 16 autonomous republics, 10 from five autonomous oblasts and 10 from autonomous okrugs).

The elected members of the Congress of People's Deputies in turn elected members of the Supreme Soviet.

== Campaign ==
A total of 6,705 candidates contested the elections. The CPSU was the only party to contest the elections, but was challenged by independent opposition candidates in nearly every seat, with only 33 uncontested. There were four main categories of candidates; Traditional Leninist communists, reformist communists supporting Mikhail Gorbachev's policies, Russian nationalists/neo-Stalinists, and democrats.

== Conduct ==
While fraud was not widespread, several independent candidates were arbitrarily blocked from standing by having their registration refused, while some candidates' names were omitted from ballot papers. Vote counting was rigged in some areas where independent observers were unable to attend. With the media still dominated by the CPSU, the elections were deemed to be "semi-free".

== Results ==
Only 121 seats were filled in the first round, with 947 going to a second round. Seven seats were left unfilled due to the turnout threshold requirement not being met. Voter turnout was 77% in the first round and 69% in the second.

Although 920 of the elected members were members of the CPSU, around 350 of those elected (CPSU or independents) were deemed to be in the democratic bloc and supportive of the Democratic Russia programme.

Party	Seats
Communist Party of the Soviet Union	920
Non-partisans	148
Total	1,068

== Aftermath ==
The elected Congress began its first session on 16 May. Among the elected deputies from the CPSU was Boris Yeltsin, who was then elected by the Congress as Chairman of the Supreme Soviet of RSFSR, effectively the leader of Russia. Many CPSU members, including Yeltsin, subsequently resigned from the CPSU. The CPSU was temporarily banned by Yeltsin in August 1991 in the aftermath of the August Coup, and the CPSU, along with the Soviet Union, collapsed completely by December of the same year.
