= Viktor Sheynis =

Russian politician (1931–2023)

- Виктор Шейнис
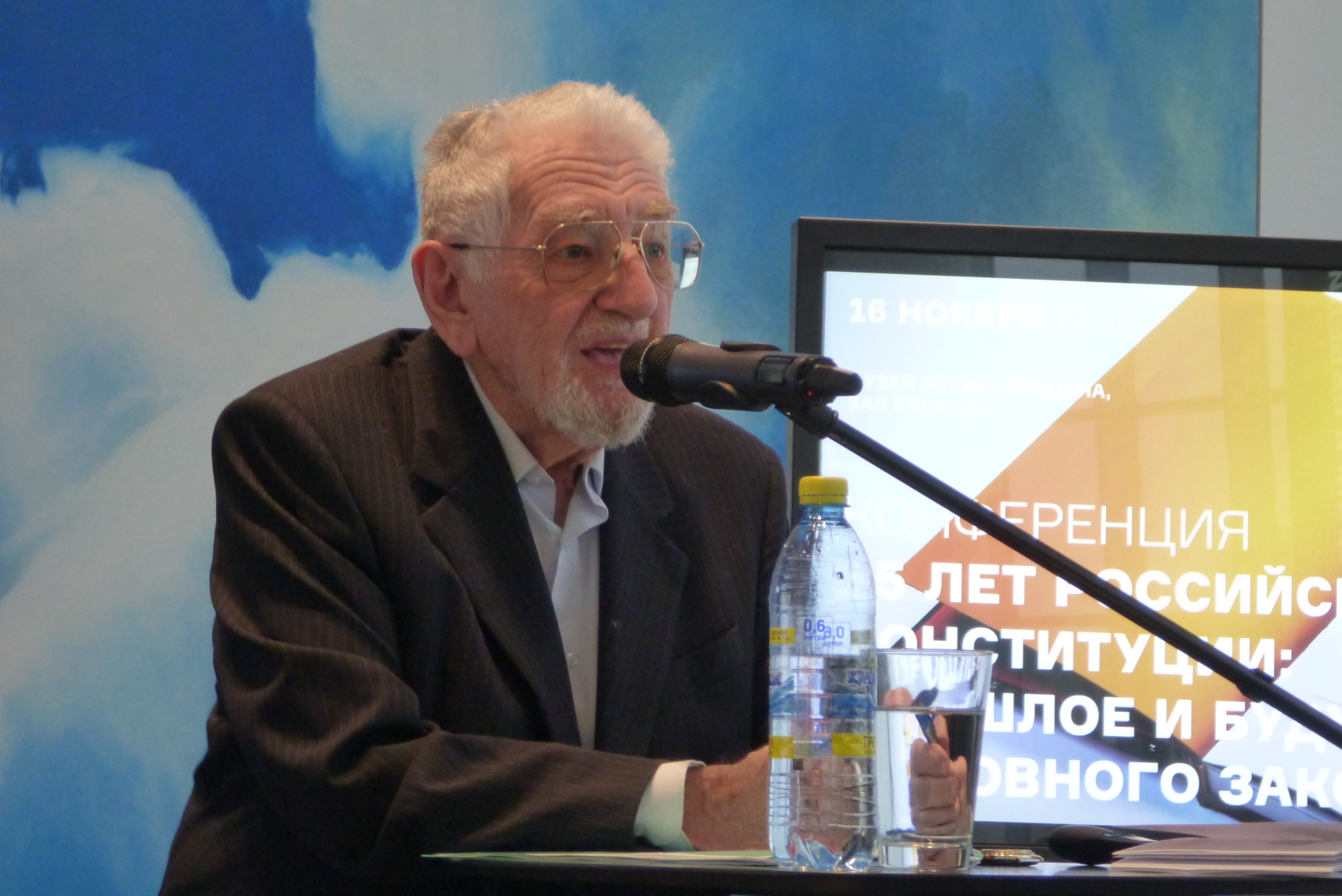
- Sheynis in 2018

State Duma deputy
- In office 11 January 1994 – 18 January 2000

Congress of People's Deputies deputy
- In office 16 May 1990 – 4 October 1993

Personal details
- Born: 16 February 1931 Kyiv, Ukrainian SSR, Soviet Union
- Died: 25 June 2023 (aged 92) Moscow
- Resting place: Khovanskoye Cemetery
- Party: Yabloko
- Other political affiliations: CPSU (until 1991)
- Education: Leningrad State University
- Awards: Medal "Defender of a Free Russia"; Hungarian Order of Merit

Viktor Leonidovich Sheynis (Russian: Виктор Леонидович Шейнис; 16 February 1931 – 25 June 2023) was a Soviet and Russian politician, economist, political scientist, and member of the Political Committee of the Yabloko Party. He held a doctorate in economics.

== Biography ==
Born into a Jewish family, in Kiev, Ukrainian SSR, Sheynis graduated from the History Department of Leningrad State University. In 1966, he earned his PhD in Economics from the Economics Department of Leningrad State University, with a dissertation titled "Portuguese Colonialism in Africa: Economic Problems and Development Trends in the Postwar Period". In 1982, he earned his Doctor of Economics from the Institute of World Economy and International Relations of the Soviet Academy of Sciences, with a dissertation titled "Economic Growth, Social Processes, and Differentiation of Developing Countries: Problems and Contradictions". He was also a professor.

=== Work and political protest ===
From 1954 to 1957, Sheynis worked as a history teacher at Leningrad School No. 107. From 1957 to 1958, he was a graduate student at the Institute of Oriental Studies of the Soviet Academy of Sciences.

In 1957, Sheynis, along with other authors, wrote the article "The Truth About Hungary," criticizing the Soviet invasion of Hungary. In 1958, he was expelled from the Komsomol and graduate school for this action.

From 1958 to 1964, he worked at the Kirov (formerly Putilov) factory in Leningrad.

=== Academic activity ===
From 1964 to 1975, Sheynis was a graduate student, then an assistant, and then an associate professor in the Department of Economics of Contemporary Capitalism at Leningrad University. He taught the economics of foreign countries. He was forced to leave his teaching position at the university due to political "unreliability."

From 1975 to 1977, he was a senior researcher at the Institute of Socio-Economic Problems of the USSR Academy of Sciences (Leningrad). From 1977, he became a senior researcher, leading researcher, and chief researcher at the IMEMO of the USSR Academy of Sciences (before being elected to the State Duma). From 2000, he again served as a chief research fellow at the IMEMO.

=== Political career ===
From 1988, Sheynis was a member of the Moscow Tribune club.

In 1990, he was elected as a People's Deputy of the RSFSR for Sevastopol Electoral District No. 47 in Moscow after his rival, Igor Surikov, withdrew under pressure from the electoral commission. In 1991, he was an active opponent of the State Committee on the State of Emergency. From 1991 to 1993, he was a member of the Soviet of the Republic of the Supreme Soviet of Russia and Deputy Executive Secretary of the Constitutional Commission of the Supreme Soviet of Russia. At the Congress of People's Deputies of Russia, he was one of the organizers of the "Consent for Progress" faction, which generally supported Boris Yeltsin's policies but opposed the unconstitutional dissolution of parliament.

On 12 December 1991, as a member of the Supreme Soviet of the RSFSR, he voted to ratify the Belovezha Accords on the Dissolution of the Soviet Union. From 1993 to 1994, he was Deputy Chairman of the Commission on Legislative Proposals under the President of Russia. He was one of the authors of the Constitution of the Russian Federation.

In the December 1993 parliamentary election, he was elected to the State Duma on the federal list of the Yavlinsky-Boldyrev-Lukin Bloc electoral association, of which he was one of the founders. He joined the Yabloko faction and was a member of the Committee on Legislation and Judicial-Legal Reform.

In the December 1995 parliamentary election, he was elected to the State Duma on the federal list of the Yabloko electoral association. He joined the Yabloko faction and was a member of the State Duma Committee on Legislation and Judicial-Legal Reform.

During the Soviet era, he was a member of the Communist Party of the Soviet Union. He later became a member of Yabloko. He was a theorist and practitioner of Russian parliamentarism.

On 23 May 2010, he participated as an observer in the parliamentary elections in the unrecognized Nagorno-Karabakh Republic, after which he was included by the Ministry of Foreign Affairs of Azerbaijan on the list of personae non gratae for violating the "Law on the State Border" of the Republic of Azerbaijan; Baku considers the territories controlled by the NKR to be "occupied". Sheynis himself commented on this fact: "I will survive this.".

He died on 25 June 2023, at the age of 92, after a long illness. He is buried in the Khovanskoye Cemetery.

Sheynis wrote about his political experience:

The years spent in politics were the most interesting and, probably, the most controversial of my life. I regret almost nothing I did during those years. I'm glad we've settled accounts (even if incompletely and inconsistently) with one of the worst chapters of Russian history—Stalinism and its continuation—a period dubbed by the ridiculous euphemism "stagnation". I regret, however, the many things I and my political friends failed to accomplish. We lacked the wisdom (and sometimes just common sense) and strength to direct domestic economic development along a different path—like that taken by, say, Poland or Brazil. As a result, the country is where it is at the beginning of the new millennium. Much of this probably didn't depend on us.

He was married to sociologist and PhD candidate in economics Alla Konstantinovna Nazimova (born 1932).
