= Democratic Choice of Russia – United Democrats =

Democratic Choice of Russia – United Democrats Демократический выбор России — объединённые демократы
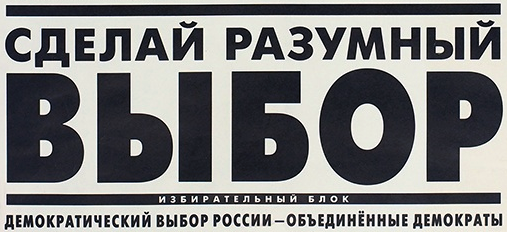
- Abbreviation: DVR–UD (English); ДВР–ОД (Russian)
- Leader: Yegor Gaidar
- Founded: August 1995
- Dissolved: 17 December 1995
- Headquarters: 23th Building, Profsoyuznaya Street, Moscow, Russia
- Newspaper: "Democratic Choice", magazine "Open politics"
- Ideology: Liberal conservatism Anti-communism
- Political position: Centre-right
- Member parties: Democratic Choice of Russia; Russian Party of Social Democracy; Peasant Party of Russia
- Colours: White; Blue; Red
- Slogan: "Make the smart choice!" (Russian: "Сделай разумный выбор!")
- Seats in the State Duma 2 convening (1995-2000): 9 / 450

Democratic Choice of Russia – United Democrats (Russian: Демократический выбор России — Объединенные демократы) was a bloc that contested the 1995 Russian legislative election, winning 3.86% of ballots and getting 9 candidates (all members of the Democratic Choice of Russia party) elected through majoritarian districts. The bloc included Democratic Choice of Russia, the Russian Party of Social Democracy, the Peasants' Party of Y. Chernichenko, the Congress of National Associations of A.Rudenko-Desnyak. Additionally, the bloc was joined by organizations Women for Solidarity (Iren Andreeva) and Military People for Democracy (of Vladimir Smirnov). In the 1995 election, the bloc received 2,674,084 votes, or 3.86% of the party-list vote, and won nine seats in single-member constituencies.
