= 1990 Turkmen Supreme Soviet election =

Supreme Soviet elections were held in the Turkmen SSR on 7 January 1990. Multi-party politics had been introduced but the Communist Party of Turkmenistan (CPT) remained the only registered party. With a voter turnout of 94%, the CPT won around 90% of the 175 seats.

== See also ==
- 1990 Soviet Union regional elections
