= Russian Party of Social Democracy =

Russian Party of Social Democracy Российская партия социальной демократии
- Abbreviation: RPSD (English); РПСД (Russian)
- Leader: Alexander Yakovlev (1994–2000), Konstantin Titov (2000–2002)
- Founders: Alexander Yakovlev; Yevgeny Shaposhnikov
- Founded: 15 September 1994
- Dissolved: 26 November 2001
- Merger of: Social Democratic Party of Russia (1990) (Factions); Democratic Initiative; Russian Free Labor Party; Russian Democratic Reform Movement; Peasant Party of Russia
- Merged into: Social Democratic Party of Russia (2001)
- Headquarters: Moscow, Russia
- Membership (1995): 4,700
- Ideology: Social democracy
- Political position: Centre-left
- National affiliation: Union of Right Forces (1999)
- Colours: Purple; Blue

Russian Party of Social Democracy (RPSD; Russian: Российская партия социальной демократии; РПСД; Rossiyskaya partiya sotsialnoy demokratii, RPSD), initially United Movement of Social Democracy (UMSD or EDSD; Russian: Единое движение социал-демократии; ЕДСД; Yedinoye dvizheniye sotsial-demokratii, YeDSD) was a political party in Russia. It was founded in February 1995 on the initiative of Alexander Nikolaevich Yakovlev, the 'architect of perestroika', who in 1994 had called for forming a united movement of Russian social democrats. At first it seemed that many notable perestroika era politicians with social-democratic or 'generally democratic' views would join the new organization. Among them were A. Golov (leader of the Social Democratic Party of Russia), P.Bunich (Party of Democratic Initiative), I. Kivelidi (leader of the Russian Party of Free Labor), G. Popov (Movement of Democratic Reforms), Y.Chernichenko (Peasant Party of Russia).

However, hardly any of them joined the party when its congress took place on 18 February 1995. Alexander Yakovlev was elected as the chairman, the party's programme emphasised 'social partnership', and at the same time supported constructive co-operation with the government and president Yeltsin. In August 1995, the Party of Social Democracy joined Democratic Choice of Russia, Peasant Party of Russia and similar organisations, forming the Democratic Choice of Russia - United Democrats bloc. No RPSD members were elected. At the moment of registration (April 1995) the party had 4,700 members with little support outside Moscow.
