= Peasant Party of Russia =

Peasant Party of Russia Крестьянская партия России
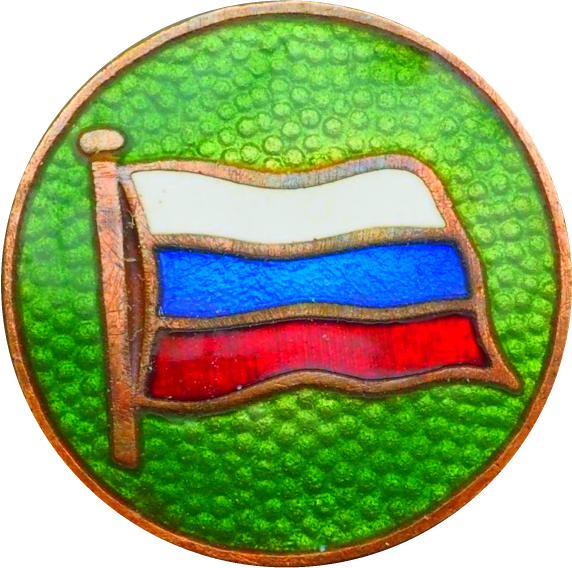
- Abbreviation: KPR (English); КПР (Russian)
- Leader: Yuri Chernichenko
- Founded: September 4, 1990
- Dissolved: August 1999
- Split from: Inter-regional Deputies Group
- Merged into: Republican Party of Russia; Union of Right Forces
- Headquarters: Moscow
- Membership (1992): 4,000
- Ideology: Liberalism; Agrarianism; Anti-communism
- Political position: Centre-right
- Colours: Green

The Peasant Party of Russia (KPR; Russian: Крестьянская партия России; КПР; Krestyanskaya partiya Rossii, KPR) was a minor pro-reform party active in Russia during the 1990s. It was led by Yuri Chernichenko. It eventually merged with like-minded groups to form the Republican Party of Russia

The party was founded in 1990, with the aim of resurrecting peasants-proprietors. From 1992 to 93, two Peasant Party members (Anatoliy Mostovoy and Viktor Shinkaretsky) were people's deputies of the Russian Federation. The party participated in the Democratic Russia coalition and took part in the 1993 election within the list Choice of Russia. In 1995, it participated in the parliamentary election within the Democratic Russia-United Democrats list, which failed to cross the 5 per cent barrier. It supported Boris Yeltsin's candidature for presidency in 1996. In 1998, the Peasant Party of Russia participated of the Right Cause coalition; thereafter on informal basis in the Union of Right Forces.
