= Gleb Yakunin =

Soviet-Russian Orthodox Christian priest and human rights activist

- Глеб Павлович Якунин
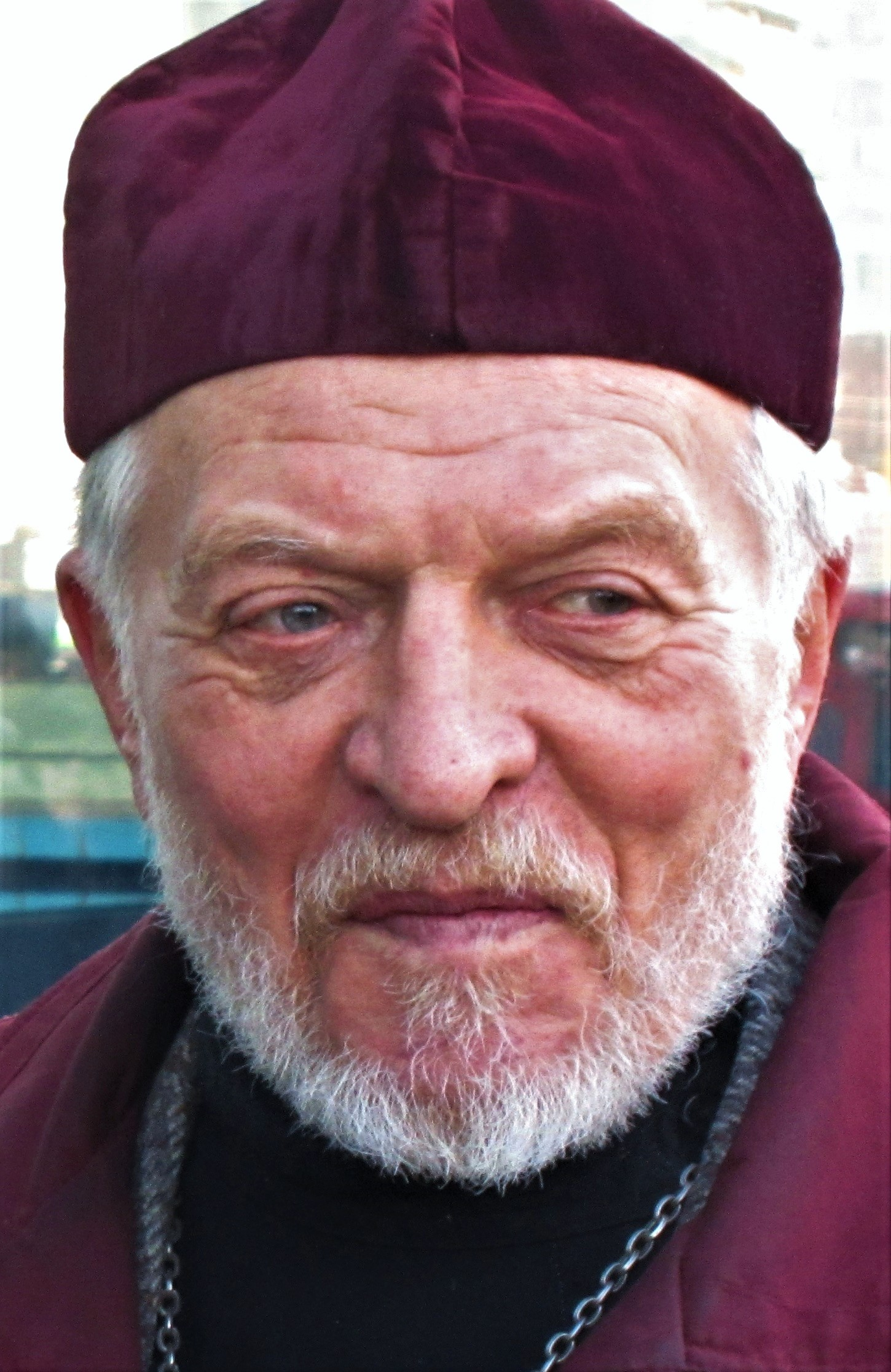
- Gleb Yakunin at a pro-democracy rally in Moscow, November 2012

Member of the Supreme Soviet of Russia
- In office 1990 – 12 December 1993
- Succeeded by: Position abolished (Himself as a member of the State Duma)

Member of the State Duma
- In office 12 December 1993 – 17 December 1995
- Preceded by: Position established (Himself as a member of the Supreme Soviet of Russia)

Personal details
- Born: 4 March 1936 Moscow, Russian SFSR, Soviet Union (now Russia)
- Died: 25 December 2014 (aged 78) Moscow, Russia
- Party: Democratic Choice of Russia

Gleb Pavlovich Yakunin (Russian: Глеб Па́влович Яку́нин; 4 March 1936 – 25 December 2014) was a Russian priest and dissident, who fought for the principle of freedom of conscience in the Soviet Union. He was a member of the Moscow Helsinki Group, and was elected member of the Supreme Soviet of Russia and State Duma from 1990 to 1995.

== Biography ==
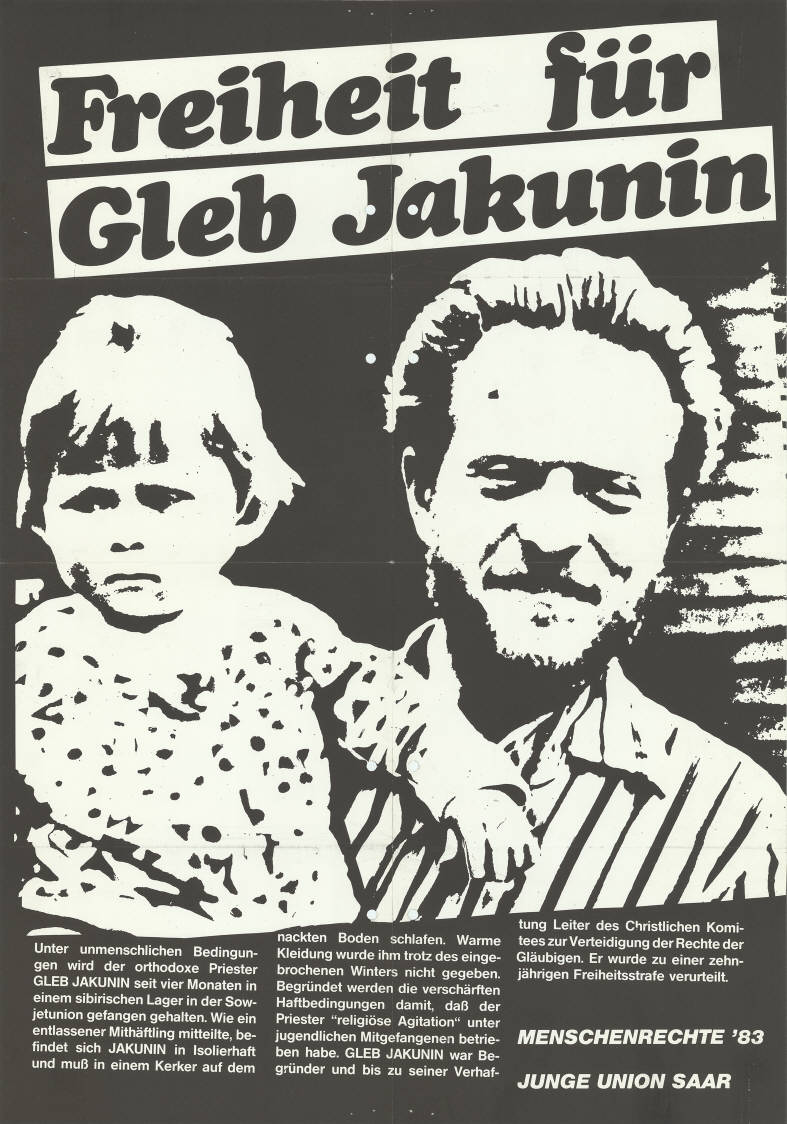
The 1983 German poster reads: freedom for Gleb Yakunin

Gleb Pavlovich Yakunin was born into a musical family. He studied biology at Irkutsk Agricultural Institute. He converted from atheism to Eastern Orthodox Christianity at the end of the 1950s, after coming into contact with Alexander Men, and graduated from the Moscow Theological Seminary of the Russian Orthodox Church in 1959. In August 1962 he was ordained a priest and was appointed to the parish church in the city of Dmitrov, near Moscow.

Together with the priest Nikolai Eschliman, Yakunin wrote an open letter in 1965 to the Patriarch of Moscow, Alexius I, where he argued that the Church must be liberated from the total control of the Soviet state. The letter was published as a samizdat ("self-published", i.e., underground press). In retaliation for this, he was forbidden to continue his priestly ministry in the parish in May 1966. Aleksandr Solzhenitsyn supported Gleb Yakunin and Nikolai Eschliman in his letter to Patriarch Alexius.

In 1976 he created the Christian Committee for the Defense of the Rights of Believers in the USSR. He published several hundreds of articles about the suppression of religious freedom in the Soviet Union. These documents were used by dissidents of all religious denominations. Yakunin was arrested and convicted for anti-Soviet agitation on 28 August 1980. He was kept in the KGB Lefortovo prison until 1985, and then in a labor camp known as "Perm 37". Later, he was punished by involuntary settlement in the Yakut Autonomous Soviet Socialist Republic.

Gleb Yakunin was given amnesty in March 1987 under Mikhail Gorbachev. He was allowed to return to Moscow and worked again as a priest until 1992. He was rehabilitated in 1991. In 1990 Yakunin was elected to the Supreme Soviet of the Russian Federation and worked as deputy chairman the Parliamentary Committee for the Freedom of Conscience. He was co-author of the law concerning "freedom of all denominations" that was used for the opening of churches and monasteries throughout the country.

Gleb Yakunin was a member of the committee created for the investigation of the Soviet coup attempt of 1991 and chaired by Lev Ponomaryov, and thereby gained the access to secret KGB archives. In March 1992 he published materials about the cooperation between the Moscow Patriarchate and the KGB. He published code names of several KGB agents who held high-rank positions in the Russian Orthodox Church including Patriarch Alexius II, Metropolitans Filaret of Kyiv, Pitrim of Volokolamsk, and others. The Russian Orthodox Church defrocked Yakunin in 1993.

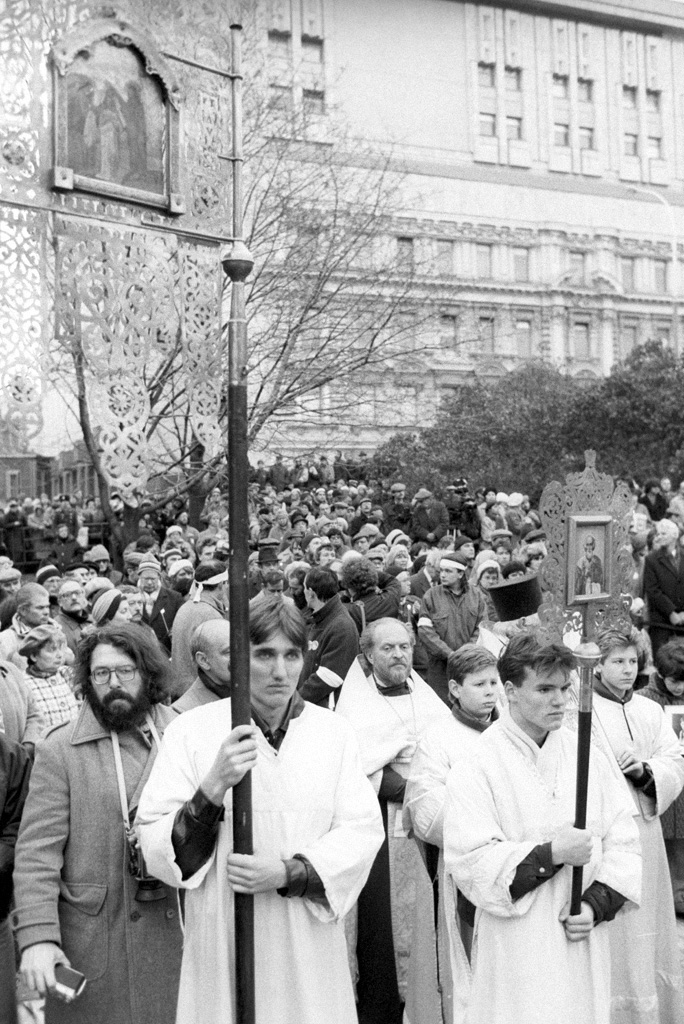
“Opening of monument to victims of political repressions”. Yakunin (center of the second row) performing a service for the victims of the Stalinist political repressions at Solovetsky Stone from the then Solovetsky special-purpose camp (the Solovetsky Monastery) set up in front of the KGB headquarters in Lubyanka Square, Moscow, on October 30, 1990.

Gleb Yakunin was one of the organizers of the Democratic Choice of Russia political alliance in 1993, prior to the opening of the Constituent Assembly of Russia called by the Russian president Boris Yeltsin. He became a State Duma delegate representing the party "Democratic Russia" in 1996. He created the Committee for Defense of Freedom of Conscience in 1995. He criticized the law "On Freedom of Conscience and Religious Associations" adopted by the Duma and made numerous statements in support of human rights in Russia.

As is traditional for Orthodox parish priests, Gleb Yakunin was married, and had three children: Maria, Alexander and Anna.

He died at the age of 78 after a long illness on 25 December 2014.

== Writings ==
=== Books ===
- Yakunin, Gleb; Regelson, Lev (1978). Letters from Moscow: religion and human rights in the USSR. Keston & San Francisco: Keston College, Centre for the Study of Religion and Communism.
- Yakunin, Gleb; Regelson, Lev (1978). Christians under communist rule: how shall we answer the call? Appeal at D. 5. Plenary assembly D. Ökumeni advice D. Churches. Faith in the Second World. Küsnacht.
- Yakunin, Gleb (1979). O sovremennom polozhenii Russkoi Pravoslavnoi Tserkvi i perspektivakh religioznogo vozrozhdeniya Rossii: Doklad Khristianskomu Komitetu zashchitu prav veruyushchikh v SSSR. Frankfurt am Main: Posev.
- Pushkarev, Sergei; Rusak, Vladimir; Yakunin, Gleb (1989). Christianity and government in Russia and the Soviet Union: reflections on the millennium. Boulder/London: Westview press. ISBN 978-0-8133-7524-3.

=== Articles and interviews ===
- Yakunin, Gleb (January 1994). "First open letter to Patriarch Aleksi II". Religion, State and Society. 22 (3): 311–316. doi:10.1080/09637499408431652.
- Yakunin, Gleb (January 1994). "Second open letter to Patriarch Aleksi II". Religion, State and Society. 22 (3): 320–321. doi:10.1080/09637499408431655.
- Shafarevich, Igor; Yakunin, Gleb; Regelson, Lev (January 1976). "Fr. Dmitri Dudko: an eye-witness account". Religion in Communist Lands. 4 (2): 21–31. doi:10.1080/09637497608430763.
- Масюк, Елена (29 January 2014). Священник Глеб ЯКУНИН: Патриарх Кирилл функцию КГБ взял как бы на себя [Priest Gleb Yakunin: Patriarch Kirill took over as it were the KGB function]. Novaya Gazeta (in Russian). No. 9.

== See also ==
- Persecution of Christians in the Soviet Union
- Human rights in the Soviet Union
