= Yury Afanasyev =

Russian historian and politician (1934–2015)

- Юрий Афанасьев
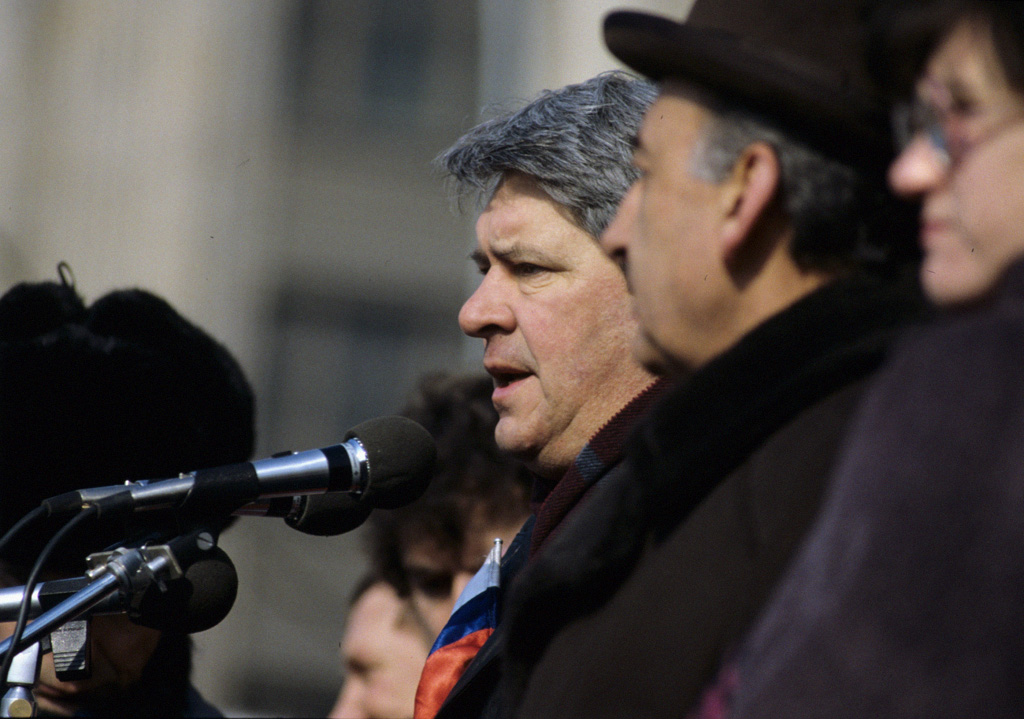
- Afanasyev speaking at a rally in 1991
- Born: Yury Nikolayevich Afanaseyev; 5 September 1934; Russia, Soviet Union
- Died: 14 September 2015 (aged 81); Moscow, Russia
- Citizenship: Soviet Union; Russian
- Yury Afanasyev's voice From the Echo of Moscow program, 4 October 2007

Yury Nikolayevich Afanasyev (also spelled Yuri Afanasiev; Russian: Юрий Николаевич Афанасьев; 5 September 1934 – 14 September 2015) was a Soviet/Russian historian and one of the leaders of Russia's democratic movement in the late 1980s – early 1990s. He was also the rector of the Moscow State Institute of History and Archives which he transformed in 1991 into the Russian State University of Humanities (RSUH) and led until 2003, making it into one of Russia's most internationally prominent educational institutions.

== Biography ==
Born in a village in the Volga region, Yury Afanasyev graduated from the history department of the Moscow State University (1957) and defended his kandidat and doktor (doctoral and post-doctoral) dissertations in French historiography, specializing in the Annales school. He did a part of his postdoc studies in Sorbonne in the 1970s. In between his studies, he worked as a Komsomol functionary in Siberia (near Krasnoyarsk) and later as a professor and a dean at the Komsomol educational institution. Since 1983, he was a member of the editorial board of the CPSU magazine, 'Kommunist'. In 1986, he was appointed rector of the Moscow State Institute of History and Archives.

During Gorbachev's perestroika, Afanasyev gained prominence as a major critic of the officially accepted narrative of Soviet history, especially of the Stalin era. In March 1989 he was elected from a single-mandate district in the Moscow region to the USSR's newly created legislature, the Congress of People's Deputies. He became widely known for his speeches in one of which he lambasted the Congress' "aggressively submissive majority", as he called it (an expression that became one of the catchphrases of this period). In June 1989, along with Boris Yeltsin, Andrei Sakharov, and other members of Congress, he launched an opposition faction within it, called The Inter-Regional Group of Deputies, and was elected one of its five co-chairs.

In 1990, Afanasiev quit the CPSU and took part in the formation of the Democratic Russia Movement. In 1991-92, he served as one of the co-chairs of its Coordinating Council. In June 1991, he was elected to Russia's Congress of People's Deputies, also newly formed. In the same year, he transformed the Moscow State Institute of History and Archives into the Russian State University of Humanities.

In August–September 1991, in the wake of the victory over the coup, Afanasyev launched the Independent Civic Initiative, a political club of prominent academics and human rights figures which included Yelena Bonner, Leonid Batkin, Lev Timofeyev and others. With it, he tried to set the Democratic Russia Movement on a path of radical democratic critique of Yeltsin and the newly elected mayors of Moscow and St.Petersburg, Gavriil Popov and Anatoly Sobchak, criticizing them for top-down approach to economic reforms, authoritarian style and nationalistic pronouncements. He called for an accelerated dismantling of the Soviet Union and for convening a Constituent Assembly in Russia. In January 1992, he failed to gain the support of the majority of the Democratic Russia leadership which opted for closer relations with the Kremlin and ended up with a minority of votes in its leadership. In response, he suspended his co-chairmanship of the movement and announced, along with his supporters, that they were going to continue to fight for the support its grassroots membership, but soon had to abandon these attempts.

In June 1993, Afanasyev resigned from his seat in Russia's legislature and never ran for office again but continued to criticize Yeltsin's policies. In 1996, he supported Grigory Yavlinsky's candidacy for Russia's presidency and subsequently sided with him and his Yabloko Party on many issues. In 2003, he ceded his position as RSUH rector to Mikhail Khodorkovsky's collaborator and RSUH major donor Leonid Nevzlin, who, however, in a few months was compelled to resign from this job and flee to Israel under pressure from the authorities. Afanasyev stayed at RSUH as it president. In the same year, he held an appointment as a distinguished visiting scholar at the U.S. Library of Congress. In 2005, he openly attacked Vladimir Putin in Novaya gazeta, accusing him of "destroying politics in the country" and "concentrating all the administrative power and financial flows in a narrow circle". These statements led to an upheaval at RSUH; a year later, Afanasyev retired as its president.

Afanasyev was awarded honorary degree by Amherst College (1990).
