= Lev Ponomaryov =

Russian political and civil activist

- Лев Пономарёв
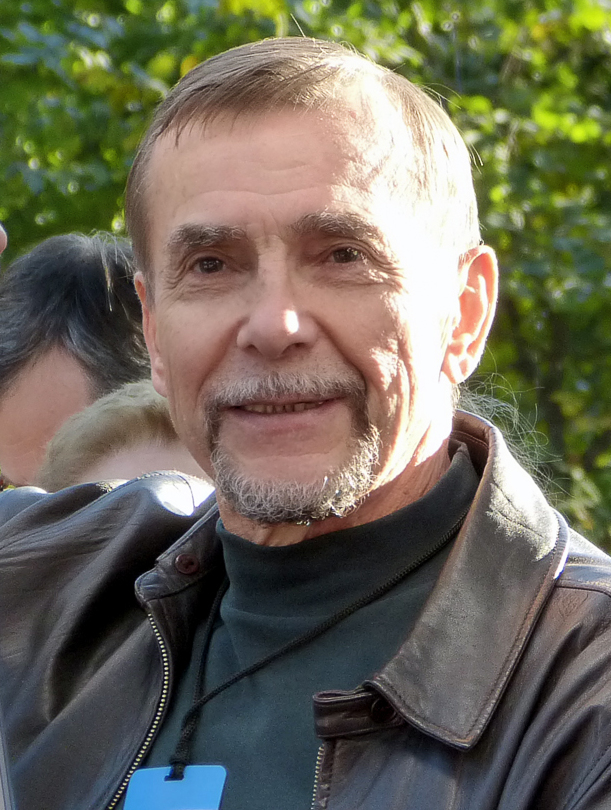
- Ponomaryov in 2014
- Born: 2 September 1941 (age 85); Tomsk, Soviet Union
- Education: the Moscow Institute of Physics and Technology
- Occupations: physicist, mathematician, human rights activist, member of the Moscow Helsinki Watch Group and Democratic Russia

Lev Aleksandrovich Ponomaryov (Russian: Лев Алекса́ндрович Пономарёв, 2 September 1941) is a Russian political and civil activist. He is an executive director of the all-Russian movement "For Human Rights." He is a member of the Federal Political Council of Solidarnost, and was deputy to the State Duma in its first period.

== Education and early career ==
Ponomaryov graduated from the Moscow Institute of Physics and Technology (MFTI) in 1965 and from the doctorate program of the same institute in 1968, becoming a doctor of physics and mathematics. He worked in the Theoretical and Experimental Physics Institute of the Russian Academy of Sciences and simultaneously taught at MFTI in the general physics department.

== Human rights and political activities ==
=== 1980s ===
In 1988, Ponomaryov helped create the human rights organization Memorial.

In 1989, Ponomaryov filled the place of academic Andrei Sakharov in the Congress of People's Deputies of the Soviet Union after he died suddenly from a heart attack. Ponomaryov took part in the Coordination Council of Moscow Union of Electors and in the initiative group for the creation of the Civil Action Committee.

=== 1990s ===
In 1990, he was elected a People's Deputy of the Russian Soviet Federative Socialist Republic. From 1990 to 1993, Lev Ponomaryov was a People's Deputy of the Russian Federation; a member of the Council of Nationalities of the Supreme Soviet of the Russian Federation; a member of the Committee on Mass Media relating to public organizations, mass movement of citizen and public opinion research; and a member of the political movement Democratic Russia and the deputies group Army Reform (Reforma armii).

In the autumn of 1991, he presided over the parliamentary commission for investigation of GKChP activities and the KGB’s role in the 1991 Soviet coup d'état attempt.

In 1993, he lost the elections to the State Duma in a single-mandate constituency and in the list of the electoral union Democratic Choice of Russia. Ponomaryov entered the Parliament only after the death of deputy Vasilii Seliunin. From 1994 to 1996 Ponomaryov was a deputy of the State Duma, a member of the committees for CIS Affairs and relations with nationalities.

In 1997, Ponomaryov founded the Russian human rights society "For Human Rights" (Za prava cheloveka), becoming its executive director and a member of the Council on Motion. Also in 1997, Ponomaryov was one of the founders of the "Hotline" (Goriachaia liniia) and founded and is one of the most active members of the group Common Action (Obshchee deistvie).

=== 2000s ===
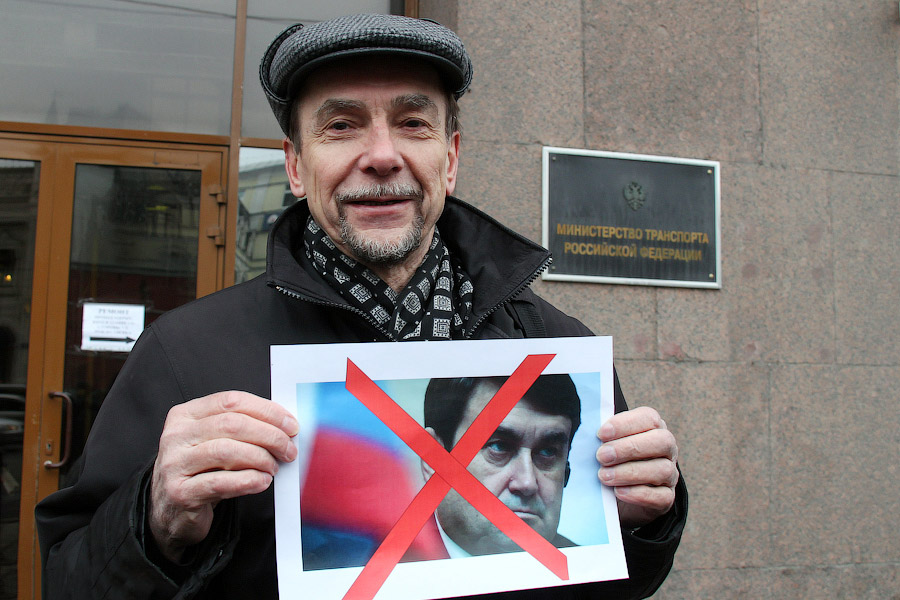
Ponomaryov at a rally at the Ministry of Transport in Moscow on 15 March 2011

He has been a member of The Other Russia coalition since its foundation in 2006 and also a member of its executive committee.

In 2007, he lost a case of defence of honour and dignity against Yury Kalinin, the Director of the Federal Service of Execution of Penalties (FSIN). The court obliged Ponomaryov to refute the unreliable information about Kalinin that he had made public.

He actively defended the ex-owner of YUKOS Mikhail Khodorkovsky and the other persons sentenced for economical offences in the YUKOS case. Some human rights activists consider that these persons are persecuted for political reasons (making them political prisoners) and that the charges against them are fabricated. In 2007, he appealed to President Putin to release Khodorkovsky. In 2009, together with other Solidarnost activists, Roman Dobrokhotov, Oleg Kozlovsky, Aleksander Rykline, Sergey Davidis, Mikhail Schneider, Vladimir Milov, Garry Kasparov and Boris Nemtsov, Lev Ponomaryov took part in a series of individual pickets in front of Meschansky district court and held a slogan "Freedom to Mikhail Khodorkovsky and Platon Lebedev".

Lev Ponomarev is a member of the United Democratic Movement "Solidarnost". On 13 December 2008, at the first Solidarnost congress, he was elected as a member of the political council of this movement.

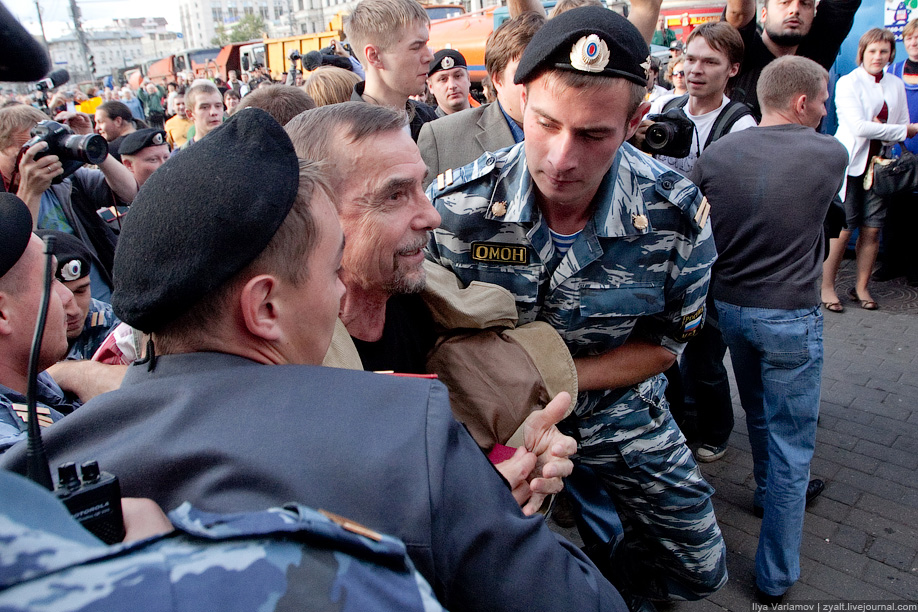
Protest action in defense of Article 31 (Freedom of assembly) of the 1993 Russian Constitution, Moscow, 31 August 2009

Late in the evening on 31 March 2009, he was physically assaulted near his home. Ludmila Alekseeva thinks that this attack was connected with his political and human rights activities within the "Solidarnost" movement. At the meeting of Russian and US Presidents on 1 April 2009, Barack Obama, according to his assistants, mentioned the attack against Ponomarev among the main US concerns about Russia.

=== 2010s ===
On 10 March 2010 he signed an appeal of the Russian opposition stating "Putin must go".

On 14 July 2010, he declared that he considered it necessary to maintain article 282 of the Penal Code.

On 25 August 2010 he was sentenced to a 3-day arrest for attempting to carry the state flag of the Russian Federation along Arbat Street on State Flag Day, 22 August. The day before, Boris Nemtsov was acquitted in the same case.

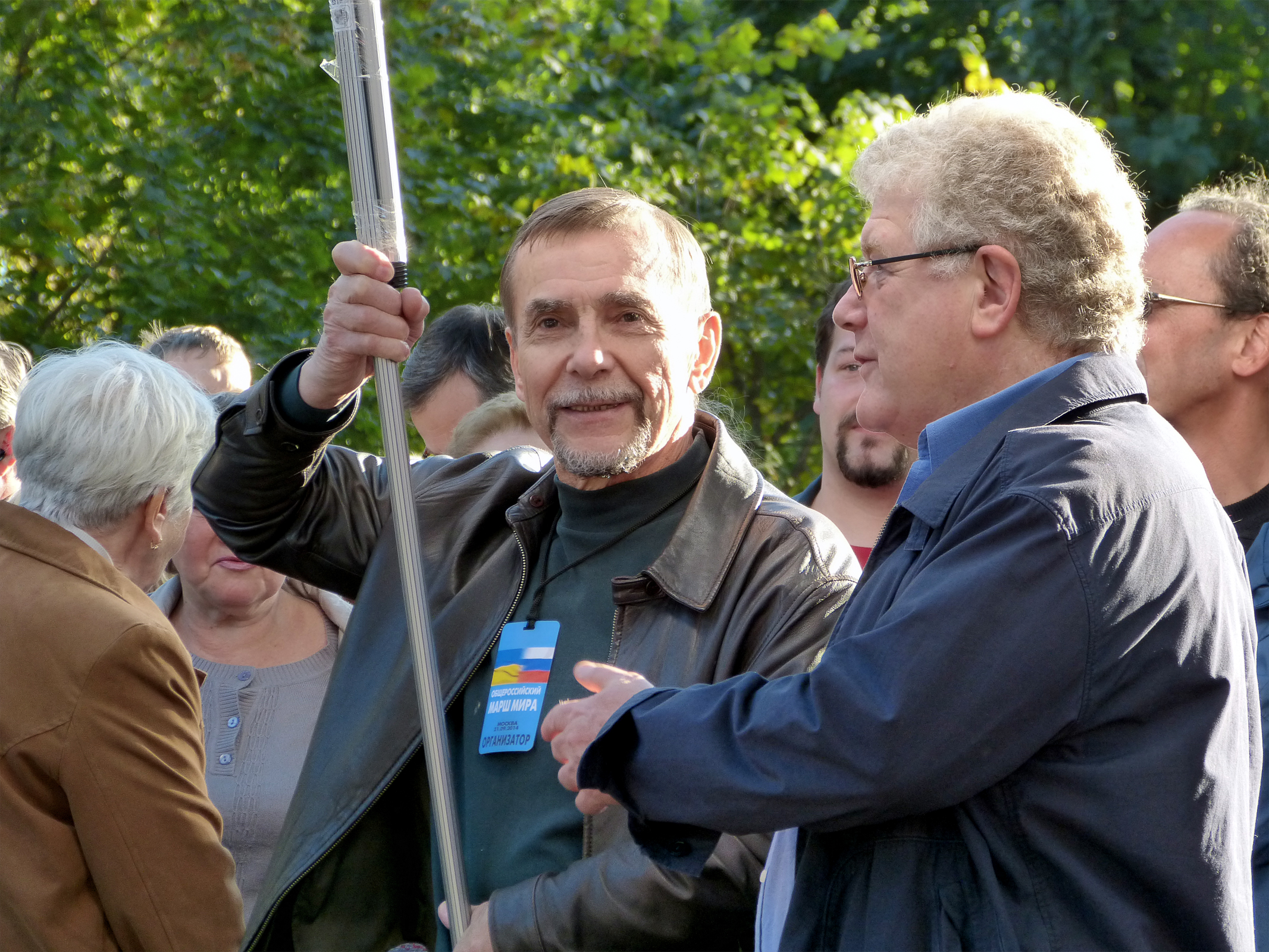
2014 anti-war protests in Russia

On 7 September 2010 he was sentenced to a 4-day arrest for disobedience of the police.

Ponomaryov was sentenced to at least 25 days of detention in December 2018 in because of a Facebook post publicising an unauthorised rally that was to take place at Lubyanka square in Moscow on 28 October. The aim of that protest was to demonstrate solidarity with certain young activists being charged with alleged anti-terrorism and anti-extremism offences.

=== 2020s ===
On 28 December 2020, Ponomaryov was added to the list of media "foreign agents" by the Russian government alongside four other persons. No reason however was provided as to why they were added to the list.

On 30 January 2022, during the prelude to the Russian invasion of Ukraine, Ponomaryov led a public declaration published in Echo of Moscow opposing the Russian threat to further invade Ukraine. By 7 February 5000 people had co-signed the declaration. On 20 February 2022, Ponomaryov and seven others, including Yuri Samodurov, held solitary street protests in Moscow against the Russian threat to attack Ukraine and were arrested.

Ponomaryov also initiated a Нет войне petition on change.org called "Stop the war with Ukraine! - No to war." By 4 March 2022, more than 1.18 millions had signed the petition already.

After the Russian invasion of Ukraine, he left Russia and lives in exile in Paris.

== Decorations and awards ==
- 2010—Ponomaryov was decorated with a Commandor's Cross of the Order of Merit of the Republic of Poland by a decree of the President of Poland Lech Kaczyński "for outstanding results in the defence of human rights and promotion of civil freedoms".

== See also ==
- Gleb Yakunin
