= Democratic Russia =

Political entity

Democratic Russia Демократическая Россия
- Leader: Boris Yeltsin; Yury Afanasyev; Lev Ponomaryov; Galina Starovoitova; Gavriil Popov; Gleb Yakunin; Nikolay Travkin; Sergei Kovalev; Viktor Sheynis; Valeriya Novodvorskaya
- Founder: Valeriya Novodvorskaya
- Founded: 8 May 1988
- Dissolved: 4 October 1993
- Headquarters: Moscow
- Ideology: Anti-communism; Liberal democracy Liberalism (Russian); Civic nationalism Economic liberalism Westernization (Russian); Anti-Sovietism
- Political position: Centre-left to centre-right (Note: On Soviet citizen rights' issues, the Democratic Russia movement was considered radical far-left in comparison to reformists under Mikhail Gorbachev who occupied centre to centre-left and conservative Communist Party hardliners who occupied the right. On the economic issues, the movement supported right-leaning economic liberalism in contrast to Gorbachev's centrist market socialist and Communist hardliners' view to retain an economically leftist planned economy. However, by Western standards, the movement occupied various positions from centre-left to centre-right.)
- Colors: White; Blue; Red
- Anthem: "The Patriotic Song" (Note: Official anthem of the Russian SFSR in 1990–1991 and of the independent Russian Federation in 1991–2000; it also became a symbol of opposition to Communist rule and culture in the early 1990s)
- Congress of People's Deputies (1990–1993): 350 / 1,068 (peak)
- Supreme Soviet (1990–1993): 90 / 252 (peak)

Democratic Russia (Russian: Демократическая Россия, romanized: Demokraticheskaya Rossiya; abbreviation: ДемРоссия, DemRossiya; ДР, DR), was the generic name for several political entities and a social movement that played a transformative role in Russia's in opposition to and transition from Communist rule between 1988 and 1993, as well as in the dissolution of the Soviet Union.

Its members were often called "radical democrats" (Russian: радикальные демократы, romanized: radikal'nyye demokraty) or simply "Democrats" (Russian: Демократы, romanized: Demokraty) In 1991–1993, the Democratic Russia movement was the largest political organization in the country and Boris Yeltsin's base of political support from his early dissent against the Communist establishment in the late 1980s until the 1993 constitutional crisis, after which the official political parties sat in the new State Duma.

== Political entities ==
1) Democratic Russia Election Bloc, association of candidates and their supporters in the 1990 election for the Congress of People's Deputies (CPD), the legislature of RSFSR (Russian Soviet Federal Socialist Republic, Russia's official name within Soviet Union), and for the regional and municipal Soviets. The bloc was formed in January 1990 at a conference of about 150 candidates for the Congress and local elections and their campaign workers. The conference adopted a Declaration drafted by Lev Ponomaryov, Sergei Kovalev, Viktor Sheynis et al. The bloc's platform included a call for equal rights for all forms of property ownership and for the freezing of retail prices during the period of transition to the market (which was directly opposite to the liberalization of prices eventually implemented by Yeltsin and Yegor Gaidar at the start of the transition). The authorship of the bloc's name is attributed to one of its founding members and leaders, Mikhail Astafyev (subsequently one of the leaders of nationalist opposition to Boris Yeltsin), who insisted upon including "Russia" in its name. Gavriil Popov, Sergei Stankevich and Nikolay Travkin were elected as coordinators of the bloc.

In the run-up to the elections, the bloc spearheaded mass rallies in Russia's cities, campaigning for the removal of Article 6 from the Soviet Constitution that codified the CPSU's one-party rule (in spite of the fact that many of its candidates still retained their membership in the CPSU). This pressure was a major factor leading to the decision of the USSR Supreme Soviet in March 1990 to drop Article 6 from the Constitution.

The bloc won the plurality of seats in the election on 4 March 1990 (about 300 out of 1,068), but many of those elected on its slate initially did not join its caucus in the CPD. The bloc also won majorities in key local Soviets, including Moscow and Leningrad, as well as Sverdlovsk and other major cities, which enabled it to form municipal governments in Russia's major cities.

2) Democratic Russia Caucus, or faction, in CPD, formed from the core membership of the bloc upon the opening of the Congress in May 1990. Its initial membership stood at around 60, but it had the support of allied factions ("Democratic Platform" and "Left Center") set up by other deputies elected with the support of the DR bloc; together, they wielded large influence over unaffiliated deputies. It played the key role in the election of Boris Yeltsin as the Congress' Chairman (speaker) by a 4-vote majority in the third round of voting; the adoption of RSFSR Declaration of Sovereignty on 12 June 1990 (officially celebrated in today's Russia as Independence Day); and the passage of key legislation that transformed Russia's political and economic system in 1990–1992.

In March 1991, it set up an umbrella coalition with allied factions – "Democratic Platform", "Joint Faction of Social Democrats and Republicans" (formerly "Left Center"), "Radical Democrats", "Independents" and "Labor Union". This coalition, under the name of Democratic Russia Parliamentary Bloc and other names, held sway in the Russian parliament until spring 1992.

In 1992–1993, the faction, led by Ponomaryov, lost members and allies mostly as a result of growing opposition to economic reforms and the shift of power toward the executive. Many of Yeltsin's erstwhile supporters in the parliament gradually abandoned him, moving either in a more social-democratic and socialist or in a more nationalist, anti-Western direction. The faction's biggest defeat was the ousting of Acting Prime Minister Yegor Gaidar by parliamentary majority in December 1992. It remained staunchly in Yeltsin's camp until the destruction of the parliament in September–October 1993. A number of formerly DR deputies won seats in subsequent elections to the new parliament, the Federal Assembly, where they joined new factions across the political spectrum, from pro-Yeltsin "Russia's Choice" (Lev Ponomaryov and Gleb Yakunin) to the pro-Communist Agrarian Party.

Democratic Russia caucuses or blocs were also formed in the spring of 1990 in regional and local Soviets by deputies that won their seats with the support of the DR Election Bloc. These factions controlled the majority of votes in key cities, including Moscow and Leningrad. Their subsequent history mirrored the path of the DR caucus in the federal parliament.

3) Democratic Russia Movement (DRM) was a political organization formed by October 1990 by Democratic Russia MPs, their allies in the Soviet parliament, grassroots pro-democracy and/or anti-communist organizations and unaffiliated political personalities. It was constituted as an umbrella organization to include both collective and individual members, including political parties. It was the largest and most influential democratic organization in Russia's contemporary history.

The organizing committee of the movement was set up in June 1990. DRM held its first, constituent congress in Moscow on 20–21 October 1990. It was governed by two bodies, a Council of Representatives, of over 250 people delegated by regional affiliates and collective members; and a smaller Coordinating Council (40-50 members representing functional units, collective members, and popular politicians). It was led by five to six co-chairs, a group that at different times included Ponomaryov, Yury Afanasyev (head of Russian State University for Humanities), Gavriil Popov (Chairman of the Moscow City Soviet who left DRM after his election as Mayor in 1991), Gleb Yakunin, Galina Starovoitova, Marina Salye et al. Some of the leaders, like Afanasyev and Popov, were recently senior career members of the CPSU; a few, like Yakunin, came from dissident underground and had never joined CPSU. The movement's leadership established a number of subsidiary organizations carrying its brand, including Democratic Russia Fund and a weekly newspaper Democratic Russia.

The overall political orientation of its leadership was liberal and united around the common goal of removing the CPSU from power, but internal factions immediately emerged both on the left and on the right. DRM actively supported Yeltsin in his struggle against Soviet leadership, including Gorbachev. It was much more divided over local politics, particularly the high-speed privatization initiated by Moscow and St.Petersburg authorities (including its own former leaders and candidates) that many viewed as rigged in favor of Communist-era establishment and "the mafia". In foreign policy, DRM was pro-Western, supportive of foreign minister Andrey Kozyrev, and advocated closer relations with European institutions. It was neutral or supportive with regard to independence movements in Soviet republics. In November 1991, DRM's 2nd Congress protested against an early attempt to dispatch Russian troops to Chechnya to overthrow its breakaway government, after which this operation was aborted.

DRM played the key role in organizing mass rallies in Russia's major cities that pushed forward democratic political reforms and liberal economic agenda, bringing 100,000 people in the streets of Moscow for its largest rally in February 1991. It also played a central role in mobilizing grassroots resistance to the abortive August 1991 hardline coup against Gorbachev and Yeltsin and defeating it. By this time, membership in DRM reached 300,000, which made it the largest nationwide political organization when CPSU ceased to exist in the aftermath of the coup in late August 1991. It was also the closest to Yeltsin's administration and played a significant role in the events that led to the formation of Yegor Gaidar's government in November 1991 and subsequent dissolution of the USSR.

At that point, it rapidly began to lose influence and membership. In the fall of 1991, its members of more nationalistic orientation distanced themselves from Yeltsin's policies that led to the dissolution of the USSR and his encouragement of more autonomy for ethnic republics within Russia proper. Most of them walked out of DRM's 2nd Congress in November 1991 and left the DR Faction by the end of the year. This included DRM's largest constituent member at the time, Democratic Party of Russia (DPR), that was part of the moderate opposition to Yeltsin in 1992–1995; as well as smaller parties, such as Russian Christian Democratic Movement and Constitutional Democratic Party – Party of People's Freedom, that in 1992 joined the hardline National Salvation Front and other radical opposition groups and ceased to exist by 1994.

On the other hand, a number of liberal democrats, such as Yuri Afanasyev and his Independent Civic Initiative, a team of radical intellectuals (Leonid Batkin, Yury Burtin et al.), developed a critique of Yeltsin's economic policies and what they saw as his excessive authoritarian and nationalist bent after 1991. They wanted DRM to present Yeltsin with conditions of its continued support for his policies, a view that the rest of the leadership opposed. This led to their departure from DRM leadership in early 1992. After a brief struggle to regain control over DRM, Afanasyev and his one-time ally Marina Salye tried to build an alternative nationwide movement, but had to abandon this effort by late 1992.

Meanwhile, DRM and all factions within it were rapidly losing activists and economic resources as market reforms progressed and most of DRM and Yeltsin's grassroots supporters became impoverished and overwhelmed with material concerns. DRM rallies attracted fewer and fewer participants, and it was soon outperformed in this regard by the nationalist and leftist opposition. The rump organization remained one of the most consistently pro-Yeltsin during the 1992–1993 power struggle between Yeltsin and the legislature. This led to the withdrawal of SDPR that took part, together with RPRF, in the creation of the future Yabloko in the fall of 1993. DRM tried to compensate for its decline by setting up short-lived umbrella associations, such as "Democratic Choice" and "Joint Committee of Democratic Organizations of Russia". Galina Starovoitova, who became one of its co-chairs after leaving the Yeltsin administration, tried to revive the movement by making it adopt a platform focused upon banning former senior CPSU and security services officers from public service. In the 1993 election to the newly created Federal Assembly, DRM participated as a collective founding member of "Russia's Choice", the most pro-Yeltsin bloc, led by Gaidar. However, it was not viewed as a significant partner, and its top leaders ended at the bottom of "Russia's Choice" list of candidates. Thus, Ponomaryov, DRM's preeminent leader after Afanasyev's departure, was listed under no. 67 and ended up without a Duma seat until he was able to fill the slot of a deceased Duma member in 1994. Eventually he and Yakunin left Russia's Choice over Chechnya War. Other DRM founders and former leaders, such as Viktor Sheynis and Vladimir Lysenko, were elected to the Duma as candidates of other formations, such as "Yavlinsky-Boldyrev-Lukin" election bloc, the future Yabloko. DPR formed its own faction in the Duma, winning 5.5% of the vote, but soon also became split over Yeltsin's economic policies and failed to win seats in the 1995 and subsequent elections.

DRM ceased to exist as an independent political force by 1994. A rump organization, led by Ponomaryov, Starovoitova et al., maintained its presence on the margins of national politics (both as DRM and as its short-lived subsidiary, Federal Party Democratic Russia). Its members remained divided between supporting Yeltsin vs. Yavlinsky, until it was de facto absorbed by the pro-Yeltsin Union of Rightist Forces in the 1999 election. The parties and most of the NGOs that were its collective founders and members also ceased to exist, de facto and in most cases de jure, by the early years of Vladimir Putin's presidency.

== Political parties – collective members of DRM ==
- Democratic Union (DS); liberal, Atlanticist, led by Valeriya Novodvorskaya, a first official political opposition party in the Soviet Union
- Republican Party of the Russian Federation (RPRF); liberal, internationalist; led by Vladimir Lysenko, Igor Chubais et al.; withdrew from DRM in Oct. 1993
- Democratic Party of Russia (DPR), led by Nikolay Travkin, Georgy Khatsenkov et al., a group that until May 1991 included Garry Kasparov; joined DRM in Jan., withdrew in Nov. 1991
- Social Democratic Party of Russia (SDPR), led by Oleg Rumyantsev, Alexander Obolensky, Pavel Kudyukin et al.; withdrew from DRM in April 1993. (Not to be confused with a smaller Social Democratic Party of Russia (United) led in 2001–2004 by Mikhail Gorbachev or with even smaller Russian Party of Social Democracy led by Alexander Nikolaevich Yakovlev.)
- Free Democratic Party of Russia (SvDPR); populist anti-Communist; led by Lev Ponomaryov, Marina Salye et al.
- Peasant Party of Russia (KPR); liberal, internationalist; led by Yury Chernichenko
- Russian Christian Democratic Movement (RKhDD); moderate nationalist; led by Viktor Aksyuchits et al.; withdrew in Nov. 1991
- Constitutional Democratic Party – Party of Popular Freedom (KDP-NS); nationalist; led by Mikhail Astafyev and Dmitry Rogozin; withdrew in Nov. 1991
- Party of Constitutional Democrats (PKD); liberal; led by Viktor Zolotarev
- Party of Free Labor (PST); liberal; led by Igor Korovikov

Other collective members: Memorial Society; Independent Miners' Union; Moscow Voters' Association (MOI); Voters' Club of the Academy of Sciences (KIAN); Moscow Tribune; Shield – Association of Afghan War Veterans; The Holocaust Fund; Moscow Anti-Fascist Committee; Union of Russia's Youth (SMR); Young Russia Union; Association of Ethnic Communities of Moscow; etc.

== Sources ==
- Brudny, Yitzhak M. "The Dynamics of 'Democratic Russia,' 1990-1993." Post-Soviet Affairs 9, no. 2 (April–June 1993): 141–176.
- Michael McFaul, Sergei Markov. The Troubled Birth of Russian Democracy: Parties, Personalities, Programs. Stanford CA: Hoover Institution Press Publication, Vol 415, 1993
- Michael Urban, with Vyacheslav Igrunov and Sergei Mitrokhin. The Rebirth of Politics in Russia. Cambridge University Press, 1997
- Richard Sakwa. Russian Politics and Society. London; New York : Routledge, 1993, 1996
- Peter Reddaway, Dmitri Glinski. The Tragedy of Russia's Reforms: Market Bolshevism Against Democracy. Washington DC: US Institute of Peace Press, 2001
- http://www.panorama.ru/works/vybory/party/dvizhdr.html
- http://partinform.ru/ros_mn/rm_4.htm
- Boris Yeltsin. Three Days That Changed The World. London : Chapmans Publishers, 1993.
- Boris Yeltsin. The Struggle for Russia / Translated by Catherine A. Fitzpatrick. New York : Belka Publications Corp. : Times Books, c1994
- Yu.G.Burtin, E.D.Molchanov, eds. God posle Avgusta : gorechʹ i vybor : sbornik stateĭ i interʹvi︠u︡. Moscow: Izd-vo "Lit-ra i politika", 1992 (in Russian)
- Yuri Afanasiev, Rossiia na rasputie (in Russian)
