= Inter-regional Deputies Group =

Political alliance in the Soviet Union

The Inter-Regional Deputies' Group (Russian: Межрегиональная депутатская группа, МДГ) was the first legal parliamentary opposition in the Soviet Union, a faction formed in 1989 within the 1st Congress of People's Deputies. It was the base of the formation of the Democratic Russia Election Bloc whose main political goal, suggested by Andrei Sakharov, was to remove the Communist Party from power, in particular to remove the declaration of its leading role from the constitution. The Inter-Regional Group operated until 1991. It was dissolved due to lack of the common constructive programme.

The first meeting took place on June 7, 1989. The first general conference took place from June 29 to June 30, where the group's leadership was solidified and elected. 316 deputies attended the conference.

The Inter-Regional Deputies' Group advocated for freedom of the press and democracy.
