= 2018 Russian presidential election =

- 18 March 2018
- Opinion polls
- Registered: 109,008,428
- Turnout: 67.50% (▲2.23 pp)
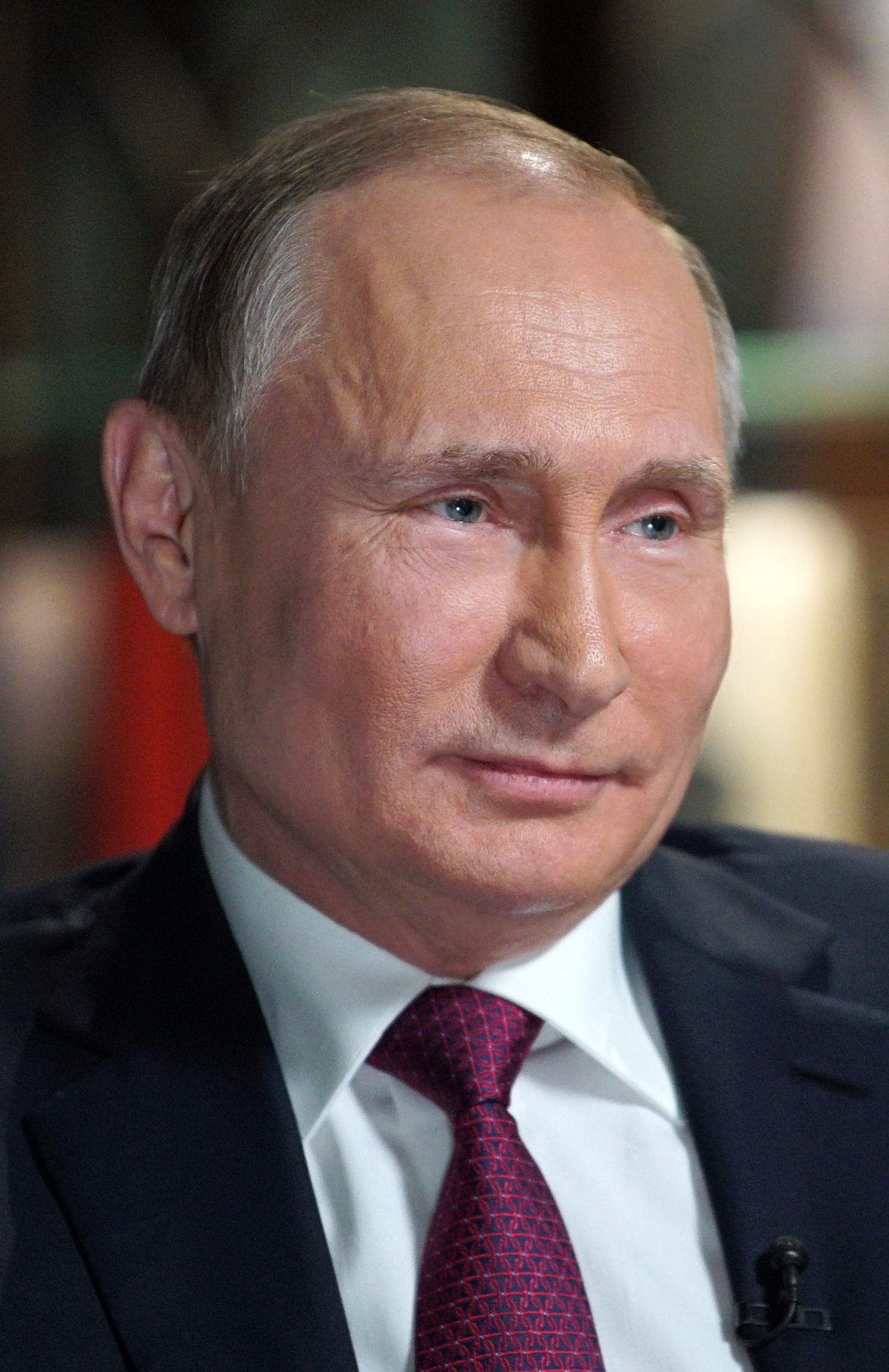

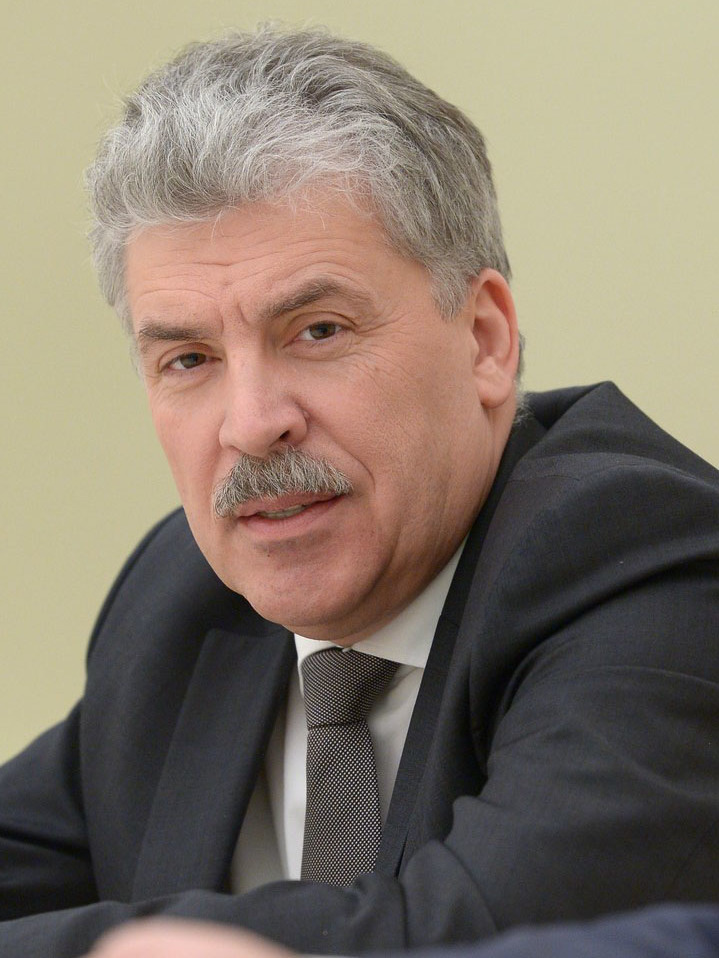

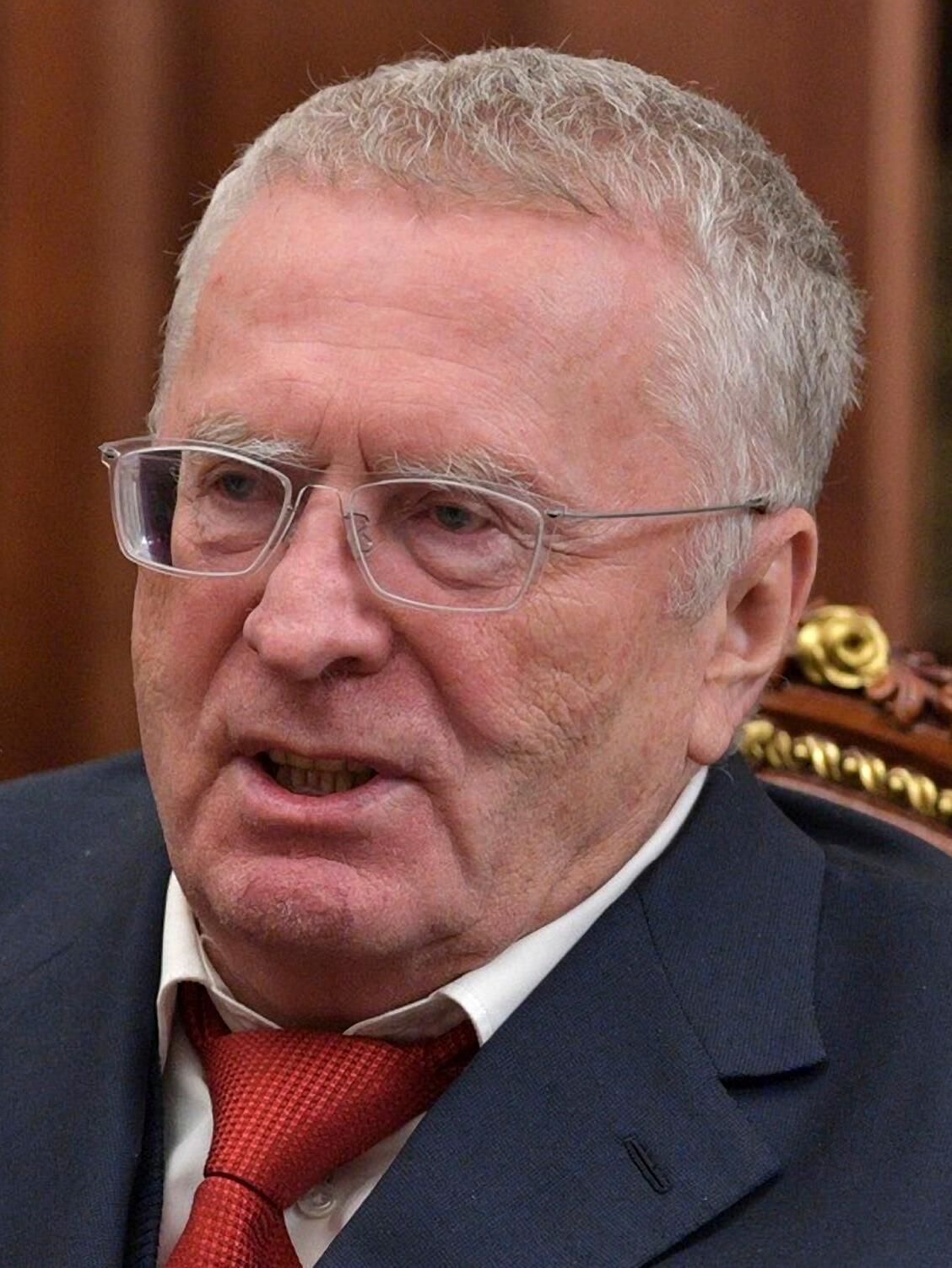
Nominee	Vladimir Putin	Pavel Grudinin	Vladimir Zhirinovsky
Party	Independent	CPRF	LDPR
Alliance	ONF
Popular vote	56,430,712	8,659,206	4,154,985
Percentage	77.53%	11.90%	5.71%
- Results by federal subject
President before election
Vladimir Putin
Independent
Elected President
Vladimir Putin
Independent

Presidential elections were held in Russia on 18 March 2018. Incumbent president Vladimir Putin was eligible to run. He declared his intent to do so on 6 December 2017 and was expected to win. This came following several months of speculation throughout the second half of 2017 as Putin made evasive comments, including that he had still not decided whether he would like to "step down" from the post of president, that he would "think about running", and that he "hadn't yet decided whether to run for another term". Different sources predicted that he would run as an independent to capitalize more support from the population, and although he could also have been nominated by the United Russia party as in 2012, Putin chose to run as an independent. Among registered voters in Russia, 67% voted in the election.

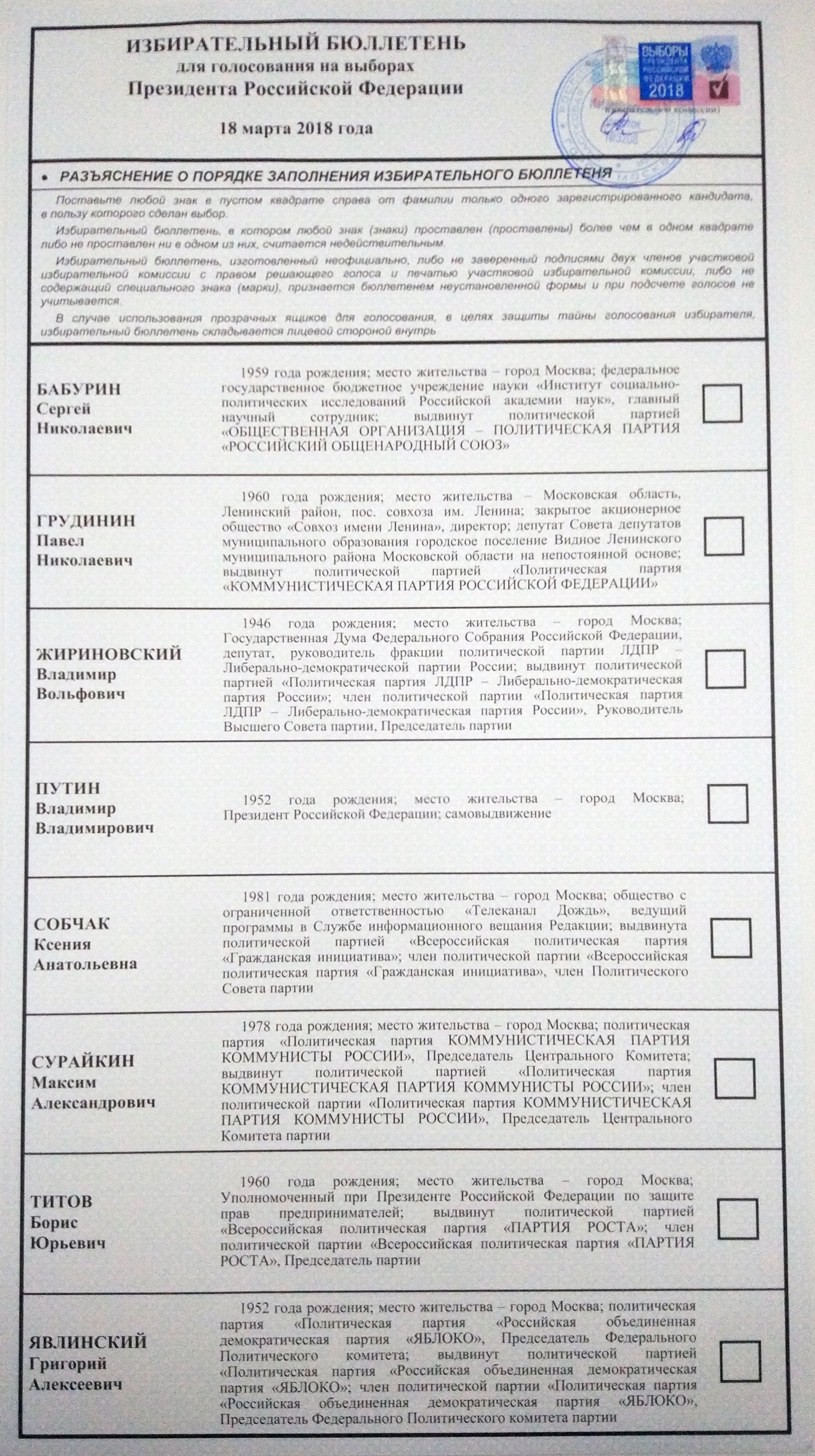
Ballot paper for the election

There were allegations of widespread electoral fraud, including ballot box stuffing, forced voting, and threats against election observers. A video widely shared online showed people stuffing papers into ballot boxes. In addition, critics of Putin were barred from running.

Putin was re-elected for his second consecutive term (and fourth overall) with 78% of the vote. Vladimir Zhirinovsky from the Liberal Democratic Party, a perennial candidate having unsuccessfully run in five previous presidential elections, finished third with 6% of the vote. Other candidates included Pavel Grudinin (Communist Party), Sergey Baburin (Russian All-People's Union), Ksenia Sobchak (Civic Initiative), Maxim Suraykin (Communists of Russia), Boris Titov (Party of Growth) and Grigory Yavlinsky (Yabloko). Anti-corruption activist Alexei Navalny announced his intent to run in December 2016 but was barred from doing so due to a prior criminal conviction for corruption, which was widely seen as politically motivated. Consequently, Navalny, who had previously organized several public rallies against corruption among members of Putin's government, called for a boycott of the election. He went on to die in a labor camp in 2024 after being poisoned, according to European sources.

== Background ==
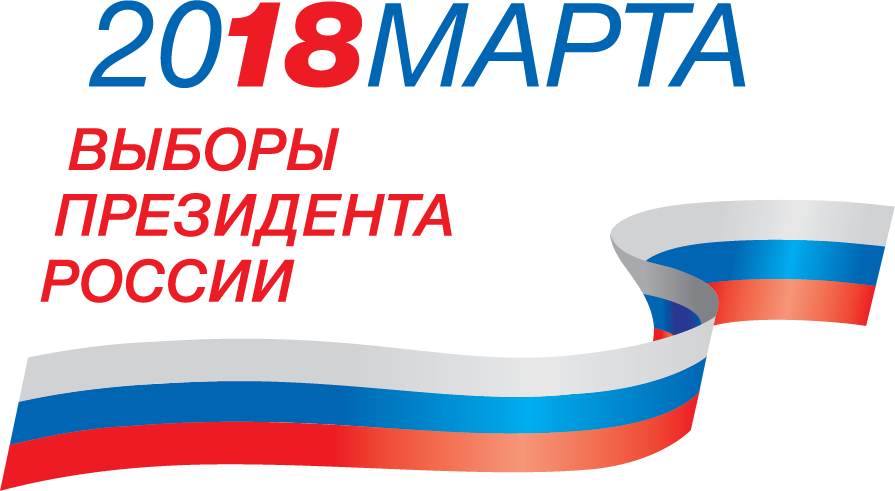
Election logo

The president of Russia is directly elected for a term of six years, since being extended from four years in 2008 during Dmitry Medvedev's administration. According to Article 81 of the Constitution of the Russian Federation, a candidate for president must be at least 35 years old, hold no dual nationality, have permanently resided in Russia for the past 10 years, and cannot serve more than two terms consecutively. Parties with representation in the State Duma can nominate a candidate to run for office while candidates from officially registered parties that are not in parliament have to collect at least 100,000 signatures. Independent candidates have to collect at least 300,000 signatures with no more than 7,500 from each federal subject of Russia and also from action groups made up of at least 500 people. The nomination process took place during Russia's winter holiday period, and 31 January 2018 was the last day for submitting signatures in support of contested access candidates.

=== Change of date ===
On 3 March 2017, senators Andrey Klishas and Anatoly Shirokov submitted to the State Duma draft amendments to the electoral legislation. One of the amendments involves the transfer of elections from the second to the third Sunday in March, i.e. from 11 to 18 March 2018. According to article 5, paragraph 7 of Russian Federal law No. 19-FZ, "If the Sunday on which presidential elections are to be held coincides with the day preceding a public holiday, or this Sunday falls on the week including a public holiday or this Sunday is declared to be a working day, elections are appointed on the following Sunday". The second week of March includes International Women's Day (8 March), which is an official holiday in Russia. The bill passed through the State Duma and Federation Council without delay in May 2017 and was signed into law by Vladimir Putin on 1 June 2017. On 15 December, the upper house of the Federal Assembly, the Federation Council, officially confirmed that 18 March 2018 will be the date of the election, officially beginning the process of campaigning and registration for candidates. This date is significant in the country as it is the fourth anniversary of Russian annexation of Crimea.

A total of 97,000 polling stations were open across the country from 08:00 until 20:00 local time.

=== Nomination of candidates ===
==== Free access ====
Political parties represented in the State Duma or the legislative bodies of not less than one-third of the federal subjects could nominate a candidate without collecting signatures. The following parties could nominate candidates without collecting signatures: Civic Platform, the Communist Party of the Russian Federation, the Liberal Democratic Party of Russia, A Just Russia, Rodina and United Russia.

On 1 July 2017, Chairman of Rodina Aleksey Zhuravlyov announced that his party would only support incumbent president Vladimir Putin in the election. On 11 December, the leader of Civic Platform Rifat Shaykhutdinov also said that his party would support Putin. On 24 December, the leader of A Just Russia Sergey Mironov stated that his party would not put forward a candidate. Senior party member Mikhail Yemelyanov confirmed that A Just Russia would support Putin's candidacy.

==== Contested access ====
Individuals belonging to a party without any seats in the State Duma had to collect 105,000 signatures to become candidates, while those running as independents had to collect 315,000 and also to form a group of activists made up of at least 500 people. Multiple political commentators, including former presidential hopeful Irina Khakamada, talked about the difficulty of gathering signatures without the support of a political party, a hurdle which cast doubt on many of the claims of the large number of people who said that they would run for president as independents. However, according to CEC Chairwoman Ella Pamfilova, the conditions for contested-access candidates were easier than ever because such potential candidates no longer had to collect 1,000,000 signatures. Pamfilova incorrectly predicted that there could be even more candidates in this election than there were in 2000, when 11 candidates contested the presidency (the largest number of candidates in the history of presidential elections in Russia).

=== Primaries ===
==== Party of Growth ====
In July 2017, the Party of Growth announced that it would hold primaries to nominate a presidential candidate. Four candidates participated in the primaries: Oksana Dmitriyeva, Dmitry Potapenko, Dmitry Marinichev and Alexander Huruji. Voting was conducted via the Internet from August to November 2017.

On 10 August 2017, the party's press secretary told the media that the results of the primaries will be taken into account at the party congress which will be held to decide the candidate for Party of Growth. However, the winner of the primaries would not guarantee themselves the right to run on behalf of the party.

On 26 November, it was announced that the party would nominate Boris Titov, who was not involved in the primaries. According to a person from the party leadership, none of the proposed candidates could obtain sufficient support.

==== Left Front ====
On 2 November 2017, the Left Front headed by Sergei Udaltsov started online primaries for the nomination of a single left-wing candidate. Primaries were held in two rounds, the first round took place from 2 to 23 November, and the second round – from 24 to 30 November.

The first round included 77 candidates, among whom were representatives of various left-wing political parties and organizations, including Pavel Grudinin, Yury Boldyrev, Gennady Zyuganov, Sergey Mironov (who later supported Vladimir Putin), Sergey Glazyev, Zakhar Prilepin, Viktor Anpilov, Valery Zorkin, Zhores Alferov, Sergey Baburin (who later was nominated as a candidate from the party Russian All-People's Union), Natalia Lisitsyna (who was later nominated as a candidate from the Russian United Labour Front), Maxim Suraykin (who was nominated as a candidate from the Communists of Russia) and others.

Boldyrev and Grudinin made it through to the second round, which was won by Grudinin, who garnered 4,086 votes (58.4%).

At the end of December 2017, Grudinin was officially nominated as the candidate from the Communist Party.

==== Third Force ====
The bloc Third Force held primaries among candidates from ten non-parliamentary parties to nominate presidential candidates. According to the organizers, the primaries would determine four presidential candidates representing different views.

The official presentation of the candidates was held on 30 October 2017. The candidates included: Andrei Bogdanov, Andrey Getmanov, Olga Onishchenko, Stanislav Polishchuk, Sirazhdin Ramazanov, Ildar Rezyapov, Vyacheslav Smirnov, Irina Volynets and Alexey Zolotukhin.

However, the block failed to identify a clear winner, then all candidates, except for Olga Onishchenko declared that they would participate in the elections. Later, however, all of the candidates refused to participate.

== Candidates ==
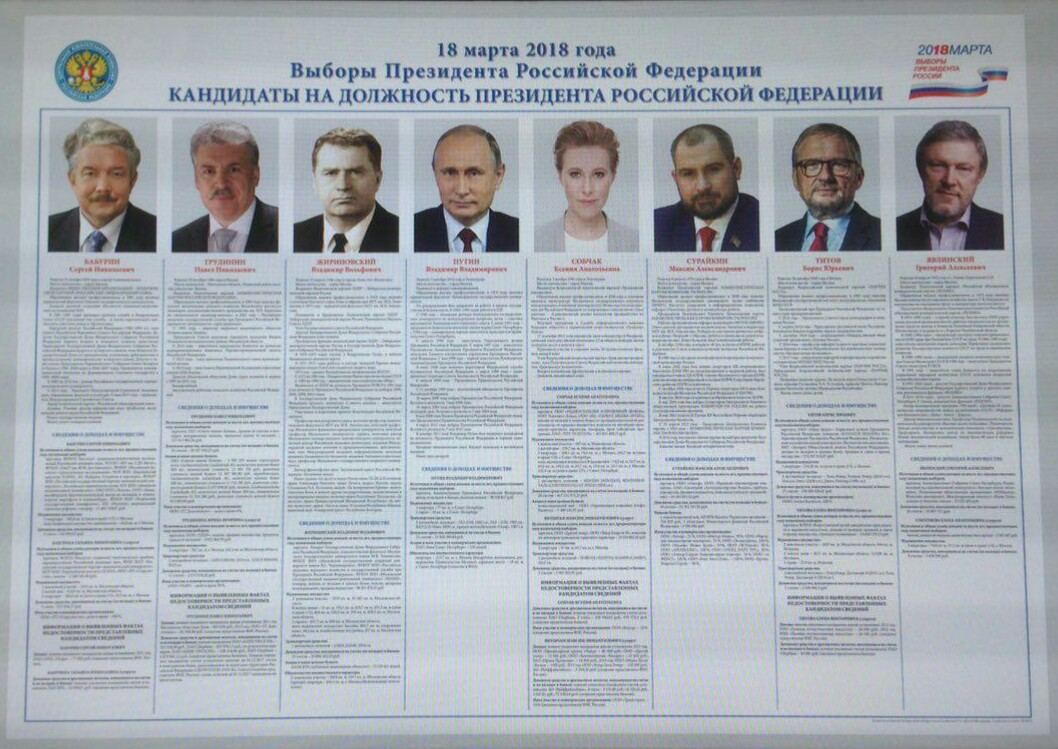
Poster with information about the officially registered candidates, placed at an electoral precinct

These candidates were officially registered by the CEC. Candidates are listed in the order they appear on the ballot paper (alphabetical order in Russian).

Candidate name, age, political party	Political offices	Campaign	Details	Registration date
Sergey Baburin (59); Russian All-People's Union	People's Deputy of Russia (1990–1993); Deputy of the State Duma (1994–2000, 2003–2007); Leader of the Russian All-People's Union (2011–present)	(Campaign • Website)	On 22 December 2017, the Russian All-People's Union nominated Baburin as its presidential candidate. On 24 December, Baburin filed registration documents with the CEC. The CEC rejected Baburin's bid on 25 December because it identified violations in the information provided regarding 18 of his party's 48 representatives. Baburin resubmitted the documents and they were approved by the CEC.	7 February 2018
Pavel Grudinin (57); Communist Party	Deputy of the Moscow Oblast Duma (1997–2011)	(Campaign • Website)	Although Communist Party leader and perennial candidate Gennady Zyuganov said all leftist forces supported his nomination and he would participate in the elections on behalf of the party, the Zhigulevsk branch of the party voted to support the candidacy of Grudinin, who also won the primaries of Left Front, a coalition of left-wing parties with no representation in the State Duma. Grudinin did not deny his nomination from the Communist Party. On 21 December 2017 it was reported that Zyuganov proposed to nominate Grudinin. Initially the Communist Party and the National Patriotic Forces of Russia (NPFR) planned to nominate a single candidate: Grudinin (supported by the Communists) or Yury Boldyrev (supported by the NPFR). Boldyrev also participated in the primaries of Left Front in which he lost in the second round to Grudinin. According to the Deputy Alexander Yushchenko, Zyuganov was still among the candidates for the nomination. He named the other candidates as Yury Afonin, Sergey Levchenko and Leonid Kalashnikov. On 22 December Zyuganov, Levchenko and Kalashnikov withdrew their bids, and Zyuganov rejected the candidacies of Afonin and Boldyrev, leaving Grudinin as the sole candidate. Grudinin was officially nominated at the party congress on 23 December. Zyuganov is the head of Grudinin's presidential campaign. Grudinin filed registration documents with the CEC on 28 December and 9 January 2018.	12 January 2018
Vladimir Zhirinovsky (71); Liberal Democratic Party	Deputy of the State Duma (1993–2022); Leader of the Liberal Democratic Party (1991–2022)	(Campaign)	In June 2015, Zhirinovsky said he plans to participate in presidential elections, but in July of the same year, the politician said that the Liberal Democratic Party, perhaps "will pick a more efficient person." Already in March 2016, he announced the names of those who were likely to be nominated as a candidate from the Liberal Democratic Party. This included Deputy Chairman of the State Duma Igor Lebedev or deputies Mikhail Degtyarev, Yaroslav Nilov and Alexei Didenko. On 28 October 2016, the LDPR's official website released a statement announcing that the party will nominate Zhirinovsky as their presidential candidate. This is the fifth time that he is running for president since the breakup of the Soviet Union (and sixth overall). Zhirinovsky was officially nominated by his party at its 31st congress on 20 December 2017. He submitted to the CEC some of the documents required for registration the next day, and the rest of them on 27 December. At 71, Zhirinovsky is the oldest person to run for president in Russia.	29 December 2017
Vladimir Putin (65); Independent	President of Russia (2000–2008 and 2012–present); Prime Minister of Russia (1999–2000 and 2008–2012); Leader of United Russia (2008–2012); Director of the Federal Security Service (1998–1999)	(Campaign • Website)	On 6 December 2017, Putin announced that he would run for a second consecutive term. Putin announced that he would run as an independent at his annual press conference on 14 December. Putin's action group officially put forward his nomination in Moscow on 26 December. Putin filed registration documents with the CEC the next day. The CEC approved his documents on 28 December. On 29 January, Putin handed over the signatures to the CEC. By 2 February, they had been verified – only 232 signatures were deemed invalid.	6 February 2018
Ksenia Sobchak (36); Civic Initiative	None	(Campaign • Website)	TV anchor, opposition activist, and journalist Ksenia Sobchak announced that she would run for president in October 2017. Sobchak is the first female candidate in 14 years and the youngest candidate to run since 2004. Sobchak was nominated by Civic Initiative at the party's congress on 23 December and became a member of the party. Sobchak filed registration documents with the CEC on 25 December. Her documents were approved by the CEC on 26 December.	8 February 2018
Maxim Suraykin (39); Communists of Russia	Chairman of the Central Committee of the Communists of Russia (2012–present)	(Campaign)	The Central Committee of the Communists of Russia party announced the nomination of its chairman Maxim Suraykin as its candidate for the election in February 2017. Suraykin stated that he aims to at least come in second place, and defeat Zyuganov's larger Communist Party of the Russian Federation. CR nominated Suraykin at the party congress in Moscow on 24 December. He filed registration documents with the CEC on the same day. Suraykin's documents were approved by the CEC on 25 December.	8 February 2018
Boris Titov (57); Party of Growth	Leader of the Party of Growth (2016–present); Presidential Commissioner for Entrepreneurs' Rights	(Campaign • Website)	The leader of the Party of Growth, Presidential Commissioner for Entrepreneurs' Rights Boris Titov declared that he would participate in the presidential election on 26 November 2017. Initially, the party conducted primaries in which Titov did not participate, however, according to the party leadership, none of the candidates received sufficient support. Titov was officially nominated by his party on 21 December. He submitted to the CEC the documents required for registration the next day. Titov's documents were approved by the CEC on 25 December.	7 February 2018
Grigory Yavlinsky (65); Yabloko	Chairman of Yabloko (1993–2008); Deputy of the State Duma (1993–2003); Deputy of the Legislative Assembly of St. Petersburg (2011–2016)	(Campaign • Website)	Suggestions that Yavlinsky would run for president in 2018 were first made in 2013, and he was announced as the candidate from the Yabloko party at a convention in February 2016, having been previously the party's candidate for the presidency in 1996 and 2000. In the weeks following the announcement he began campaigning for the election early by traveling to multiple cities across the country. Yabloko nominated Yavlinsky at its party congress on 22 December. He submitted to the CEC the documents required for registration the next day. Yavlinsky's documents were approved by the CEC on 25 December.	7 February 2018

== Campaigning ==
=== Sergey Baburin ===
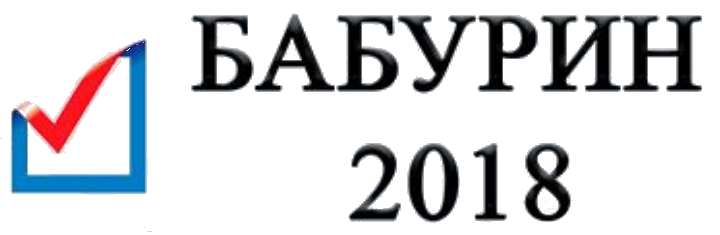
Baburin campaign logo

Sergey Baburin was nominated at the party congress on 22 December 2017. On 24 December, Baburin filed registration documents with the CEC, but the documents were rejected 25 December because the CEC identified violations in the information provided regarding 18 of his party's 48 representatives. On 29 December, Baburin resubmitted the documents and they were approved by the CEC.

Russian All-People's Union started to collect signatures in support of Baburin on 9 January 2018. Signatures were collected in 56 federal subjects. On 30 January 2018, Sergey Baburin handed over the signatures to the CEC. When testing revealed only 3.28% of invalid signatures, Sergey Baburin was admitted to the election.

=== Pavel Grudinin ===
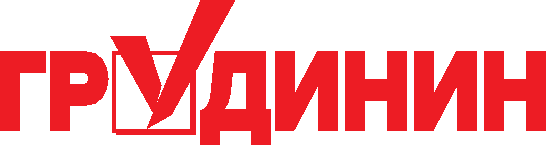
Grudinin campaign logo

At the end of November 2017, Pavel Grudinin won the primaries of Left Front, a coalition of left-wing parties with no representation in the State Duma. Some branch of the Communist Party voted to support the candidacy of Grudinin and did not deny his nomination from the Communist Party. Despite the fact that in early November the First Secretary of the Communist party, Gennady Zyuganov, said that his nomination is supported by all left-wing organizations, which the media felt was the official statement from Zyuganov to participate in the election, Zyuganov later denied this, saying that the official decision will be made at the party Congress in December. On 21 December, it was reported that Zyuganov proposed to nominate Grudinin.

Initially, the Communist Party and the National Patriotic Forces of Russia (NPFR) planned to nominate a single candidate: Grudinin, supported by the Communists, or Yury Boldyrev, supported by the NPFR. Boldyrev also participated in the primaries of the Left Front, where he lost in the second round to Grudinin. According to Deputy Alexander Yushchenko, Gennady Zyuganov was still among the candidates for the nomination. He named the other candidates as Yury Afonin, Sergey Levchenko, and Leonid Kalashnikov. On 22 December, Zyuganov, Levchenko, and Kalashnikov withdrew their bids, and Zyuganov rejected the candidacies of Afonin and Boldyrev, leaving Grudinin as the sole candidate. Grudinin was officially selected as the presidential candidate from the Communist Party at its congress on 23 December.

=== Alexei Navalny ===
Navalny campaign logo

Russian opposition figure and anti-corruption blogger Alexei Navalny started his presidential campaign on 13 December 2016. In early 2017, he traveled to different cities across Russia to open campaign offices and meet with his supporters, despite his involvement in legal cases that might have barred him from running. As noted in an article by Newsweek and by the former Russian presidential administration adviser Gleb Pavlovsky, the American-style campaign by Navalny was unprecedented in modern Russia as most candidates do not start campaigning until a few months before the election. The primary focus of Navalny's campaign was combating corruption within the current government under Vladimir Putin and Prime Minister Dmitry Medvedev. On 2 March, Navalny published a documentary on YouTube titled He Is Not Dimon To You, detailing the corrupt dealings of Prime Minister Medvedev. He then called for mass rallies to be held on 26 March to bring attention to this after the government did not respond to the documentary, which only about 150.000 people attended across Russia. 2017–2018 Russian protests 26 March rally was the largest protest held in Russia since the protests in 2011. Navalny called for another protest to be held on Russia Day, which is 12 June.

On his website, Navalny listed the main principles of his presidential program: combating government corruption, improving infrastructure and living standards in Russia, decentralizing power from Moscow, developing the economy instead of remaining in isolation from the West, and reforming the judicial system. His more specific economic proposals included instituting a minimum wage, lowering prices of apartments and reducing bureaucracy of home construction, making healthcare and education free, lowering taxes for many citizens, taxing the gains from privatization, decentralization of financial management and increase in local governance, increasing transparency in state-owned firms, implementing work visas for Central Asian migrants coming into the country for work, and increasing economic cooperation with western European states.

In April 2017, it was reported that Navalny's campaign staff had collected more than 300,000 pledged signatures from people across 40 regions of Russia electronically. More than 75,000 people signed up to volunteer for his campaign and nearly $700,000 has been donated. However, his eligibility was put into question by his five-year suspended sentence for embezzlement of timber from the company Kirovles, when Navalny was working as an aide to Governor Nikita Belykh of the Kirov Oblast. The Russian Supreme Court overturned his sentence in November 2016 after the European Court of Human Rights (ECHR) determined that Navalny's rights were violated, and sent the case back to a district court in the city of Kirov for review. In February 2017, the district court upheld Navalny's suspended sentence. The Constitution of Russia does not allow convicted criminals to run for office. Navalny promised to appeal the result to the ECHR, and said he would continue campaigning, while in early May the deputy head of the Russian Central Election Commission (CEC) commented that he would not be allowed to run unless the sentence is overturned. In August, the head of the CEC, Ella Pamfilova, reinforced this sentiment, saying that it would "take a miracle" for Navalny to be granted permission to run. She cited two scenarios in which Navalny could run: if his conviction was overturned, or if the federal election law was rapidly changed to allow those with criminal convictions to run. Pamfilova added that the probability of either scenario was "extremely low". Pamfilova later commented that Navalny could legally run for president by "some time in 2028", i.e., ten years after his sentence expires. The Memorial Human Rights Center recognized Navalny as a political prisoner.

Members of the Navalny campaign were harassed and detained by the police, including his chief of staff Leonid Volkov, who was sentenced to thirty days in jail in early December for organizing an unauthorized rally (requests for rallies in city centers are often denied in Russia) in Nizhny Novgorod.

Navalny published his election manifesto on 13 December 2017, two days before the official start of campaigning.

He officially submitted his documents for registration as a candidate on 24 December 2017 and was rejected by the CEC the following day due to his conviction. Later that same day, 25 December, Navalny called on his supporters to boycott the election in response. Mass street protests were planned for 28 January 2018.

=== Vladimir Putin ===
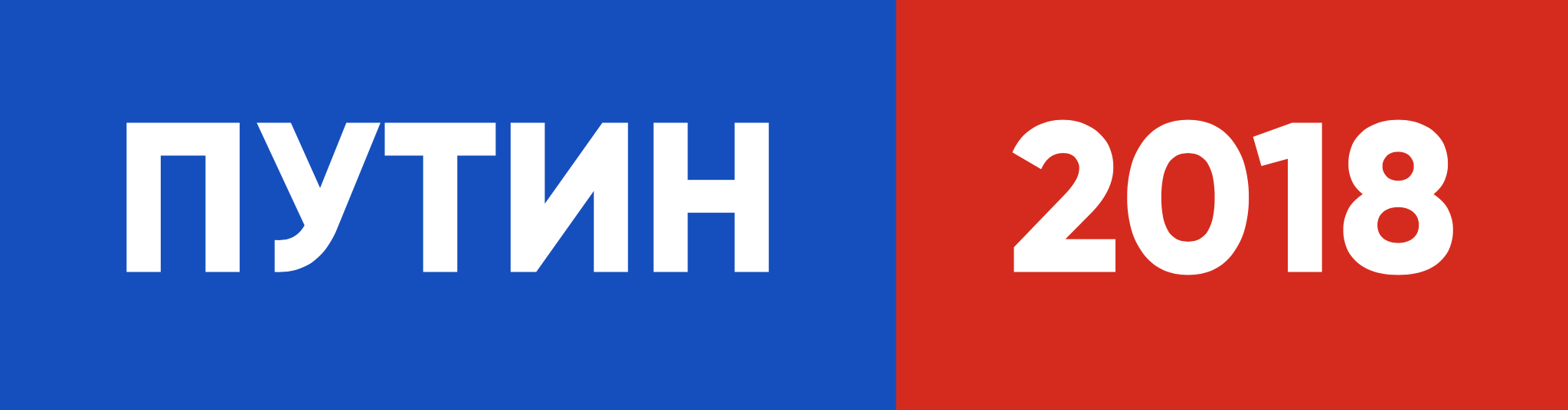
Putin campaign logo

Vladimir Putin announced his run on 6 December 2017, during his speech at the GAZ automobile plant. A Just Russia, Civic Platform, The Greens, Great Fatherland Party, Labor Party, Party of Pensioners, Patriots of Russia, Rodina, and United Russia endorsed his presidential bid.

=== Ksenia Sobchak ===
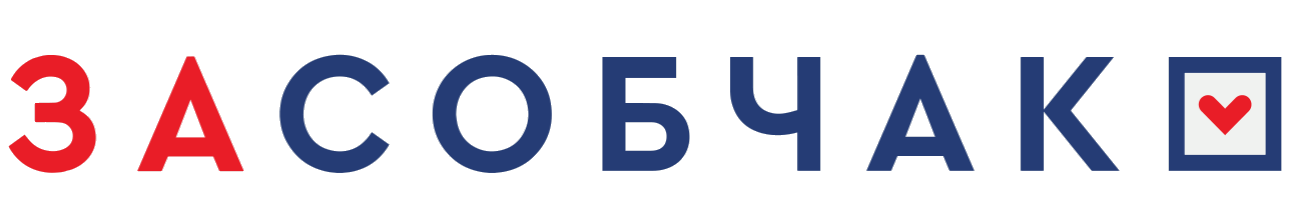
Sobchak campaign logo

Rumors about the nomination of Ksenia Sobchak in the 2018 election appeared a month before she officially announced that she would run for president.

Sobchak officially announced that she would run for president on 19 October 2017, in a YouTube video. In the video, Sobchak said she is the candidate "against all", because since the 2004 election, the "against all" option (or "none of the above" as it is more commonly known in English-speaking countries) has been excluded from the ballot, and Sobchak wants to give people the opportunity to again vote "against all". At the same time, Sobchak said she will withdraw her candidacy if Alexei Navalny is registered as a candidate by the Central Election Commission.

Originally Sobchak put herself forward as an independent candidate. In this case, she would have had to collect at least 300,000 signatures to be admitted to the election. Soon after, however, Sobchak's campaign team said that would be nominated by a political party, namely the People's Freedom Party or Civic Initiative.

On 15 November 2017, it was announced that Sobchak would be nominated by Civic Initiative at its congress in December.

On 23 December 2017, at the Civic Initiative's congress, Sobchak was officially nominated for president. On the same day, she joined the party. Sobchak's team began gathering signatures in support of her candidacy on 27 December, soon after her registration documents were approved by the CEC.

=== Maxim Suraykin ===
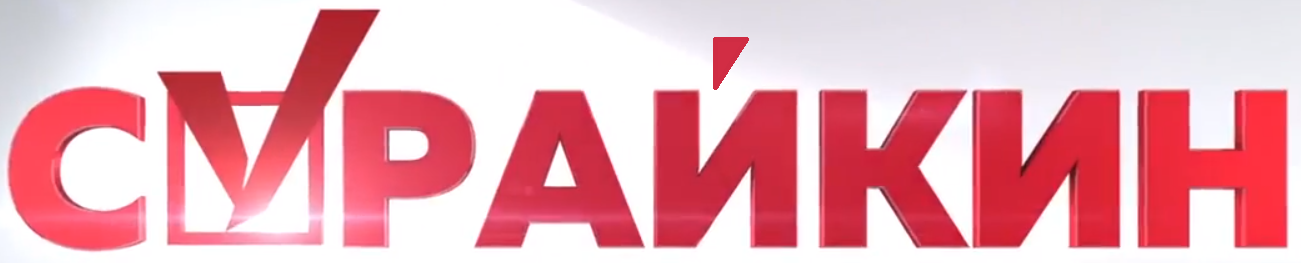
Suraykin campaign logo

In December 2017, it became known that the party Communists of Russia nominated Maxim Suraykin as presidential candidate.

On 28 May 2017, the Plenum of the Central Committee of the Communists of Russia decided on the nomination of Maxim Suraykin as a presidential candidate.

In November 2017, Maxim Suraykin was one of the candidates proposed by the Left Front as a single candidate from the left opposition. The results of the voting on the website of the Left Front Suraikin won 59 votes.

On 24 December Maxim Suraykin was officially nominated at the Communists Russia National Convention. On the same day he also submitted to the Central Election Commission.

=== Boris Titov ===
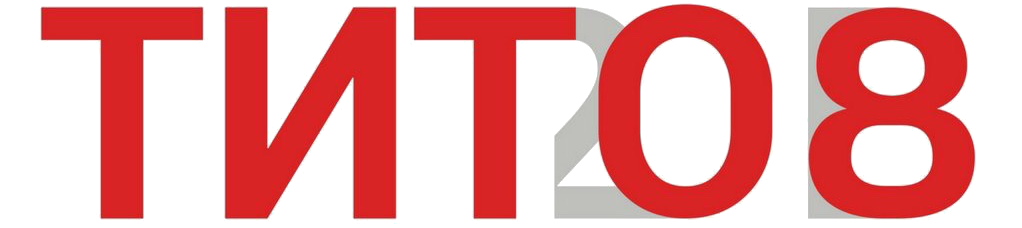
Titov campaign logo

Initially the Party of Growth conducted primaries which were attended by four candidates: Oksana Dmitriyeva, Dmitry Potapenko, Dmitry Marinichev and Alexander Khurudzhi. Boris Titov did not participate in the primaries. However, at the meeting of the federal council of the party, it was decided to nominate Titov. According to a person from the party leadership, none of the proposed candidates could obtain sufficient support.

According to Titov, the main task of participation in the election is to promote the party's Growth Strategy economic program, which was prepared by the Stolypin Club and presented to President Vladimir Putin in May 2017. During the campaign, Titov and his team intend to travel around the country to promote the program.

Titov was officially nominated by his party on 21 December. He submitted to the CEC the documents required for registration the next day. Titov's documents were approved by the CEC on 25 December, which meant that he could begin collecting signatures. A party spokesman commented that the collection signatures in support of Titov will begin in early January 2018.

=== Grigory Yavlinsky ===
Yavlinsky campaign logo

Economist Grigory Yavlinsky announced his presidential bid in February 2016 as the candidate for the liberal party Yabloko, though suggestions that he would run were first voiced in 2013 after he was barred from taking part in the 2012 election. His policies mainly focus on improving the economic situation through governance reforms and stopping involvement in conflicts. He was nominated by the party leader, Emilia Slabunova, who stressed the need to unite all "democratic forces" behind one candidate and noted his political experience and also received an endorsement from opposition politician Vladimir Ryzhkov. Yavlinsky had previously run in the 1996 and 2000 presidential elections, getting 7.4% of the vote in the former. He spoke at a party forum announcing the start of the campaign in February 2017. One proposal he made was to give out several acres of free land to families so they could build home there and develop it, which he said would house 15 million families, and to turn the Russian Armed Forces into a fully professional military by abolishing conscription.

In March 2017, Yavlinsky stated that he would be visiting several major cities in fifteen different regions across the country to raise support. He used Alexei Navalny's recent tour of different cities as an example, refusing to use the traditional model of campaigning a few months before the election. Since he is unable to visit more locations, Slabunova, the leader of Yabloko, and Nikolai Rybakov, his chief of staff, will go to other cities to campaign as well.

On 1 November 2017, Yabloko launched the official website of Yavlinsky's campaign.

=== Vladimir Zhirinovsky ===
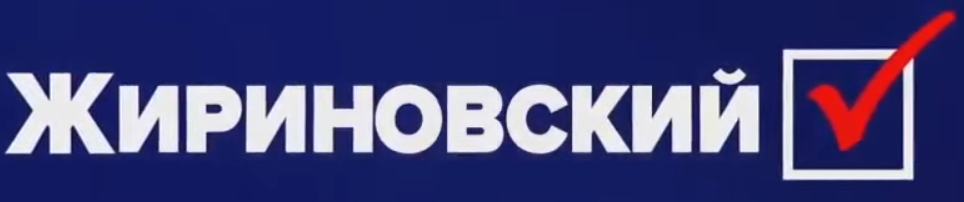
Zhirinovsky campaign logo

Vladimir Zhirinovsky announced his participation in the presidential elections on 28 October 2016 as the candidate for the Liberal Democratic Party. In the event of his election, Zhirinovsky promised to amend the Constitution of Russia and to radically change the policies of the country. In particular, Zhirinovsky promised to abolish the federal structure of Russia and to return to the Governorates, rename the post of "President of Russia" to the "Supreme Ruler of Russia" and to restore Russia's borders to the borders of the USSR as of 1985.

In March 2017, Zhirinovsky promised to declare a general amnesty if elected president.

== Debates ==
On 14 February 2018, the CEC set the schedule for the distribution of airtime for presidential candidates. Debates took place on five federal TV channels: Russia 1, Russia 24, Channel One, TV Center and PTR, as well as on three radio stations: Radio Rossii, Radio Mayak and Vesti FM. As in previous election campaigns, incumbent President Vladimir Putin refused to participate in the debates.

Debates occurred from 26 February to 15 March. Vladimir Zhirinovsky was the only candidate to attend the first debate, with the other three candidates sending representatives. The second debate, which didn not involve any candidate-to-candidate discussion, was attended by six candidates and Boris Titov's representative.

2018 Russian presidential election debates
Date	Organizer	Moderator	P Candidate was present R Representative attended A Both candidate and representative were absent								Notes
Date	Organizer	Moderator	Baburin	Grudinin	Zhirinovsky	Putin	Sobchak	Suraykin	Titov	Yavlinsky	Notes
26 February; 13:10 MT	Radio Rossii		A	R	P	A	R	A	R	A	
28 February; 09:00 MT	Channel One	Anatoly Kuzichev	P	P	P	A	P	P	R	P	
28 February; 23:15 MT	Russia 1	Vladimir Solovyov	P	P	P	A	P	P	P	P	
1 March	Russia 24		P	R	P	A	P	P	R	P	

== Opinion polls ==
Opinion polls published in the months preceding the election consistently showed Putin with an overwhelming lead over his competitors.

=== Exit polls ===
Poll source									Invalid ballots
Poll source	Putin	Grudinin	Zhirinovsky	Sobchak	Yavlinsky	Titov	Suraykin	Baburin	Invalid ballots
FOM	76.3%	11.9%	6%	2%	1%	0.7%	0.7%	0.6%	
WCIOM	73.9%	11.2%	6.7%	2.5%	1.6%	1.1%	0.8%	1.0%	1.2%

== Elections in Crimea ==
The European Union had already announced in advance that it would not recognize the results of the Russian presidential election in the annexed Ukrainian peninsula of Crimea. EU foreign affairs chief Federica Mogherini said the EU would follow through with its non-recognition policy and called on Russia to respect the rights of Ukrainian citizens. President of Austria Alexander Van der Bellen also warned that Moscow could not hold a legal election on the Crimean peninsula because the annexation of Crimea was illegal.

The EU and the OSCE had made it clear that they would not send any election observers to Crimea, as neither organizations see it as a legitimate part of Russia. Russian authorities then invited a number of friendly and sometimes marginalized foreign politicians to give the elections in Crimea the appearance of international acceptance. Leonid Slutsky, chairman of the parliament's foreign affairs committee, named Andreas Maurer from the Left, Hendrik Weber from an organization called People's Diplomacy Norway, Pedro Agramunt and Thierry Mariani. Russia commissioned Slutsky's own organization, the Russian Peace Foundation, and the Polish association European Council on Democracy and Human Rights, which in the past had brought election observers from right-wing populist and right-wing extremist circles to Crimea, to organize their trips.

== Results ==
The final results of the elections were approved by the CEC on 23 March 2018.

Results by federal subject

Candidate	Party	Votes	%
Vladimir Putin	Independent	56,430,712	77.53
Pavel Grudinin	Communist Party	8,659,206	11.90
Vladimir Zhirinovsky	Liberal Democratic Party	4,154,985	5.71
Ksenia Sobchak	Civic Initiative	1,238,031	1.70
Grigory Yavlinsky	Yabloko	769,644	1.06
Boris Titov	Party of Growth	556,801	0.76
Maxim Suraykin	Communists of Russia	499,342	0.69
Sergey Baburin	Russian All-People's Union	479,013	0.66
Total		72,787,734	100.00
Valid votes		72,787,734	98.92
Invalid/blank votes		791,258	1.08
Total votes		73,578,992	100.00
Registered voters/turnout		109,008,428	67.50
Source: CEC

=== By federal subject ===
Region	Putin		Grudinin		Zhirinovsky		Sobchak		Yavlinsky		Titov		Suraykin		Baburin		Invalid votes	
Region	Votes	%	Votes	%	Votes	%	Votes	%	Votes	%	Votes	%	Votes	%	Votes	%	Votes	%
Adygea	203,095	81.17	28,711	11.48	8,923	3.57	2,060	0.82	1,197	0.48	1,088	0.43	1,317	0.53	1,165	0.47	2,647	0.47
Altai Krai	770,278	64.66	281,978	23.67	84,785	7.12	11,778	0.99	7,259	0.61	5,532	0.46	7,885	0.66	7,581	0.64	14,203	0.64
Altai Republic	72,674	70.62	21,259	20.66	5,376	5.22	929	0.90	483	0.47	340	0.33	431	0.42	446	0.43	974	0.43
Amur Oblast	264,493	67.04	73,485	18.62	37,909	9.61	4,428	1.12	2,466	0.63	2,080	0.53	1,951	0.49	2,358	0.6	5,383	0.60
Arkhangelsk Oblast	407,190	75.27	51,868	9.59	46,925	8.67	10,588	1.96	6,239	1.15	4,982	0.92	3,842	0.71	4,448	0.82	4,880	0.82
Astrakhan Oblast	342,195	76.95	64,047	14.40	19,339	4.35	5,060	1.14	2,504	0.56	2,233	0.50	2,823	0.63	2,185	0.49	4,340	0.49
Bashkortostan	1,784,626	77.69	277,797	12.09	115,635	5.03	28,983	1.26	19,390	0.84	15,891	0.69	20,429	0.89	15,845	0.69	18,506	0.69
Belgorod Oblast	711,392	79.71	93,102	10.43	49,685	5.57	8,474	0.95	4,445	0.50	4,835	0.54	6,534	0.73	5,218	0.58	8,749	0.58
Bryansk Oblast	636,087	81.60	68,375	8.77	43,940	5.64	7,463	0.96	3,524	0.45	4,175	0.54	4,265	0.55	4,472	0.57	7,177	0.57
Buryatia	334,381	73.72	66,876	14.74	29,087	6.41	7,618	1.68	3,631	0.80	1,882	0.40	2,471	0.54	1,746	0.38	5,980	0.38
Chechnya	593,806	91.44	30,012	4.62	1,631	0.25	3,531	0.54	4,848	0.75	3,285	0.51	2,093	0.32	7,679	1.18	2,497	1.18
Chelyabinsk Oblast	1,275,822	73.00	227,134	12.99	121,670	6.96	31,326	1.79	21,573	1.23	16,181	0.93	13,243	0.76	13,468	0.77	27,234	0.77
Chukotka	22,709	82.31	1,616	5.86	2,018	7.31	358	1.30	160	0.58	180	0.65	142	0.51	115	0.42	293	0.42
Chuvashia	539,036	77.29	85,780	12.30	36,890	5.29	9,500	1.36	3,878	0.56	3,950	0.57	4,907	0.70	3,710	0.53	9,763	0.53
Republic of Crimea	994,569	92.15	23,773	2.20	19,506	1.81	17,764	1.65	5,138	0.48	2,785	0.26	2,267	0.21	2,098	0.19	11,395	0.19
Dagestan	1,295,128	90.76	103,942	7.28	3,830	0.27	3,741	0.26	2,465	0.17	5,379	0.38	4,395	0.31	1,781	0.12	6,265	0.12
Ingushetia	149,488	83.17	10,187	5.67	6,570	3.66	2,974	1.65	4,251	2.37	3,304	1.84	677	0.38	1,580	0.88	710	0.88
Irkutsk Oblast	763,810	73.06	166,540	15.93	67,373	6.44	12,646	1.21	7,545	0.72	5,339	0.51	5,240	0.50	5,480	0.52	11,545	0.52
Ivanovo Oblast	338,335	71.37	70,211	14.81	37,408	7.89	7,772	1.64	4,142	0.87	3,696	0.78	3,526	0.74	4,286	0.9	4,663	0.90
Jewish Autonomous Oblast	52,374	67.48	14,066	18.12	7,387	9.52	771	0.99	369	0.48	407	0.52	404	0.52	501	0.65	1 331	0.65
Kabardino-Balkaria	452,480	93.38	20,133	4.15	5,006	1.03	1,121	0.23	1,171	0.24	1,658	0.34	1,141	0.24	1,222	0.25	628	0.25
Kaliningrad Oblast	379,875	76.35	50,755	10.20	29,893	6.01	12 640	2.54	7 299	1.47	4 772	0.96	3 319	0.67	3 395	0.68	5 627	0.68
Kalmykia	114,833	81.66	16,399	11.66	2,734	1.94	2,117	1.51	937	0.67	632	0.45	675	0.48	502	0.36	1,790	0.36
Kaluga Oblast	414,027	76.16	59,802	11.00	37,905	6.97	8,070	1.48	5,071	0.93	4,200	0.77	3,943	0.73	4,197	0.77	6,425	0.77
Kamchatka Krai	112,401	69.44	27,432	16.95	13,733	8.48	2,210	1.37	1,159	0.72	1,131	0.70	966	0.60	912	0.56	1 920	0.56
Karachay-Cherkessia	223,534	87.64	17,819	6.99	7,076	2.77	1,132	0.44	747	0.29	454	0.18	2,533	0.99	676	0.27	1,101	0.27
Karelia	216,899	73.04	33,693	11.35	23,254	7.83	6,777	2.28	5,215	1.76	3,201	1.08	1,927	0.65	2,343	0.79	3,656	0.79
Kemerovo Oblast	1,422,919	85.42	101,153	6.07	83,777	5.03	14,002	0.84	10,471	0.63	7,213	0.43	7,556	0.45	7,972	0.48	10,657	0.48
Khabarovsk Krai	426,385	65.78	119,389	18.42	60,414	9.32	11,199	1.73	5,435	0.84	5,354	0.83	4,485	0.69	4,612	0.71	10,969	0.71
Khakassia	169,615	69.16	45,276	18.46	17,610	7.18	3 372	1.37	1,605	0.65	1,624	0.66	1,593	0.65	1,567	0.64	2,986	0.64
Khanty–Mansi Autonomous Okrug	600,404	76.23	94,785	12.02	53,569	6.79	10,884	1.38	5,060	0.64	4,363	0.55	4,095	0.52	3,916	0.5	10,824	0.50
Kirov Oblast	465,948	70.41	90,650	13.70	63,771	9.64	11,034	1.67	6,303	0.95	5,784	0.87	5,655	0.85	5,157	0.78	7,455	0.78
Komi Republic	290,716	71.44	46,094	11.33	41,680	10.24	8,179	2.01	4,080	1.00	3,809	0.94	3,215	0.79	3,234	0.79	5,908	0.79
Kostroma Oblast	221,449	68.71	52,135	16.18	29,834	9.26	4,852	1.51	3,106	0.96	2,879	0.89	2,309	0.72	2,665	0.83	3,048	0.83
Krasnodar Krai	2,564,012	81.35	316,316	10.04	144,008	4.57	30,697	0.97	16,461	0.52	21,413	0.68	17,100	0.54	15,876	0.5	26,090	0.50
Krasnoyarsk Krai	941,151	74.28	161,925	12.78	93,628	7.39	20,415	1.61	11,225	0.89	8,479	0.67	7,761	0.61	8,072	0.64	14,327	0.64
Kurgan Oblast	318,703	73.30	59,425	13.67	38,002	8.74	4,590	1.06	2,313	0.53	2,178	0.50	3,020	0.69	2,682	0.62	3,873	0.62
Kursk Oblast	482,257	81.01	56,948	9.57	33,326	5.60	5,631	0.95	2,527	0.42	2,640	0.44	3,316	0.56	3,421	0.57	5,207	0.57
Leningrad Oblast	703,423	79.01	78,545	8.82	48,465	5.44	18,715	2.10	10,719	1.20	8,129	0.91	5,655	0.64	6,136	0.69	10,539	0.69
Lipetsk Oblast	542,199	80.83	67,299	10.03	33,739	5.03	6,714	1.00	3,494	0.52	3,259	0.49	3,994	0.60	3,834	0.57	6,225	0.57
Magadan Oblast	53,341	72.30	10,364	14.07	6,185	8.34	1,007	1.36	491	0.67	458	0.62	408	0.55	417	0.57	1 108	0.57
Mari El	263,725	73.99	51,873	14.55	24,516	6.88	4,821	1.35	2,144	0.60	2,128	0.60	2,028	0.57	2,013	0.56	3,146	0.56
Mordovia	406,480	85.35	33,894	7.12	20,758	4.36	3,561	0.75	1,726	0.36	1,636	0.34	2,781	0.58	1,863	0.39	3,549	0.39
Moscow	3,201,257	70.87	563,670	12.48	211,995	4.69	184,285	4.08	143,039	3.17	70,323	1.56	32,664	0.72	43,317	0.96	66,626	0.96
Moscow Oblast	2,758,911	74.49	476,897	12.88	203,869	5.50	78,893	2.13	49,664	1.34	36,133	0.98	24,523	0.66	26,448	0.71	48,175	0.71
Murmansk Oblast	303,796	76.37	35,240	8.86	31,434	7.90	8,931	2.25	4,660	1.17	3,426	0.86	2,578	0.65	2,827	0.71	4,915	0.71
Nenets Autonomous Okrug	17,863	71.15	3,397	13.53	2,482	9.89	448	1.78	158	0.63	172	0.69	135	0.54	185	0.74	267	0.74
Nizhny Novgorod Oblast	1,334,417	77.27	183,465	10.62	111,744	6.74	27,728	1.61	16,107	0.93	14,053	0.81	12,320	0.71	12,037	0.7	15,107	0.70
North Ossetia–Alania	377,648	81.51	51,026	11.01	13,954	3.01	1,034	0.22	1,017	0.22	5,699	1.23	8,398	1.81	1,071	0.23	3,470	0.23
Novgorod Oblast	209,286	72.65	36,661	12.73	22,000	7.64	5,303	1.84	4,143	1.44	2,456	0.85	2,420	0.84	2,345	0.81	3,448	0.81
Novosibirsk Oblast	926,958	71.06	213,707	16.39	85,790	6.58	21,067	1.62	14,654	1.12	9,080	0.70	8,005	0.61	8,473	0.65	16,625	0.65
Omsk Oblast	624,934	67.31	189,303	20.39	57,901	6.24	14,282	1.54	7,592	0.82	5,832	0.63	5,653	0.61	10,496	1.13	12,487	1.13
Orenburg Oblast	731,838	72.97	155,156	15.47	67,777	6.76	11,539	1.15	5,748	0.57	6,003	0.60	7,846	0.78	6,137	0.61	10,938	0.61
Oryol Oblast	349,743	76.77	55,482	12.18	27,617	6.06	5,777	1.27	2,698	0.59	3,187	0.70	3,187	0.70	3,210	0.7	4,670	0.70
Penza Oblast	625,928	79.98	78,135	9.98	43,823	5.60	9,048	1.16	4,697	0.60	4,037	0.52	5,614	0.72	4,616	0.59	6,740	0.59
Perm Krai	993,076	75.35	138,977	10.55	90,132	6.84	28,963	2.20	16,918	1.28	11,859	0.90	10,154	0.77	9,624	0.73	18,203	0.73
Primorsky Krai	589,384	65.26	193,166	21.39	63,754	7.06	15,079	1.67	8,019	0.89	6,676	0.74	5,814	0.64	6,605	0.73	14,571	0.73
(Russia) Pskov Oblast	258,584	75.05	39,407	11.44	23,688	6.87	5,794	1.86	5,533	1.61	2,656	0.77	2,782	0.81	2,952	0.86	3,165	0.86
Rostov Oblast	1,641,189	78.97	236,287	11.37	106,905	5.14	23,036	1.11	13,761	0.66	13,046	0.63	14,121	0.68	11,741	0.56	18,200	0.56
Ryazan Oblast	458,882	76.34	76,023	12.65	37,091	6.17	7,777	1.29	4,068	0.68	3,654	0.61	3 731	0.62	4,094	0.68	5,756	0.68
Saint Petersburg	1,735,236	75.01	209,112	9.04	94,569	4.09	100,059	4.33	73,532	3.18	36,254	1.57	15,295	0.66	20,450	0.88	28,951	0.88
Sakha	294,166	64.38	124,518	27.25	18,089	3.96	7,494	1.64	2,604	0.57	2,010	0.44	1,711	0.37	1,696	0.37	4,636	0.37
Sakhalin Oblast	153,289	66.92	41,201	17.99	20,075	8.76	3,874	1.69	1,938	0.85	1,654	0.72	1,496	0.65	1,586	0.69	3,942	0.69
Samara Oblast	1,234,759	75.82	189,314	11.63	98,007	6.02	32,392	1.99	17,892	1.10	12,324	0.76	11,543	0.71	10,805	0.66	21,460	0.66
Saratov Oblast	987,373	78.33	148,585	11.79	66,254	5.26	15,067	1.20	9,268	0.74	7,485	0.59	8,326	0.66	7,436	0.59	10,736	0.59
Sevastopol	218,303	90.19	8,698	3.59	6,988	2.89	3,083	1.27	903	0.37	896	0.37	569	0.24	576	0.24	2,040	0.24
Smolensk Oblast	347,859	73.49	62,351	13.17	36,894	7.79	6,724	1.42	3,426	0.72	3,304	0.70	3,519	0.74	3,894	0.82	5,399	0.82
Stavropol Krai	1,118,523	80.55	157,345	11.33	58,778	4.23	11,656	0.84	6,130	0.44	6,985	0.50	8,008	0.58	7,593	0.55	13,559	0.55
Sverdlovsk Oblast	1,555,532	74.60	241,365	11.58	141,683	6.79	44,258	2.12	27,144	1.30	19,428	0.93	13,317	0.64	15,154	0.73	27,282	0.73
Tambov Oblast	494,966	81.81	55,183	9.12	31,418	5.19	5,311	0.88	3,210	0.53	2,521	0.42	3,593	0.59	3,137	0.52	5,652	0.52
Tatarstan	1,854,119	82.09	204,618	9.06	67,929	3.01	29,951	1.33	19,643	0.87	13,361	0.59	37,969	1.68	13,030	0.58	18,045	0.58
Tomsk Oblast	328,296	71.23	70,163	15.22	31,466	6.83	10,091	2.19	5,886	1.28	3,986	0.86	2,757	0.60	2,976	0.65	5,307	0.65
Tula Oblast	648,117	79.20	77,552	9.48	48,748	5.96	11,689	1.43	7,537	0.92	5,331	0.65	5,379	0.66	5,692	0.7	8,333	0.70
Tuva	150,795	91.98	5,762	3.51	2,809	1.71	1,779	1.09	451	0.28	339	0.21	439	0.27	406	0.25	1,160	0.25
Tver Oblast	459,198	74.55	77,050	12.51	43,421	7.05	10,144	1.65	5,635	0.91	4,846	0.79	4,902	0.80	4,718	0.77	6,027	0.77
Tyumen Oblast	672,385	79.75	69,294	8.22	64,376	7.63	11,723	1.39	4,808	0.57	4,577	0.54	4,249	0.50	4,543	0.54	7,152	0.54
Udmurtia	571,623	76.23	84,981	11.33	50,859	6.78	11,518	1.54	5,142	0.69	6,188	0.83	5,301	0.71	4,958	0.66	9,308	0.66
Ulyanovsk Oblast	477,654	74.27	94,809	14.74	40,028	6.22	7,146	1.11	3,567	0.55	4,197	0.65	4,752	0.74	3,972	0.62	7,023	0.62
Vladimir Oblast	546,042	73.65	93,649	12.63	58,822	7.93	10,777	1.45	6,147	0.83	6,098	0.82	5,075	0.68	5,440	0.73	9,351	0.73
Volgograd Oblast	929,541	77.55	140,708	11.74	69,909	5.83	14,403	1.20	10,242	0.85	6,851	0.57	8,116	0.68	8,040	0.67	10,850	0.67
Vologda Oblast	453,576	72.41	75,644	12.08	54,556	8.71	13,365	2.13	8,048	1.28	5,333	0.85	4,567	0.73	5,184	0.83	6,090	0.83
Voronezh Oblast	952,642	78.88	136,435	11.30	64,905	5.37	13,024	1.08	7,561	0.63	7,277	0.60	8,561	0.71	7,830	0.65	9,435	0.65
Yamalo-Nenets Autonomous Okrug	291,409	85.54	19,448	5.72	19,409	5.70	2,394	0.70	1,367	0.40	1,154	0.34	1,794	0.53	1,052	0.31	2,616	0.31
Yaroslavl Oblast	472,666	71.84	85,256	12.96	49,621	7.54	15,607	2.37	11,738	1.78	6,710	1.02	4,377	0.67	5,329	0.81	6,636	0.81
Zabaykalsky Krai	329,911	72.03	62,375	13.62	45,804	10.00	4,750	1.04	2,095	0.46	2,111	0.46	2,772	0.61	2,450	0.53	5,767	0.53
Baikonur	7,568	78.35	1,026	10.60	628	6.50	130	1.35	70	0.72	50	0.52	51	0.53	32	0.33	104	0.33
Voting abroad	403,306	85.02	23,871	5.03	8,224	1.73	19,203	4.05	7,433	1.57	3,079	0.65	1,439	0.30	2,010	0.42	5,801	0.42
Russia	56,430,712	76.69	8,659,206	11.77	4,154,985	5.65	1,238,031	1.68	769,644	1.05	556,801	0.76	499,342	0.68	479,013	0.65	791,258	1.08
Source: CEC

== Reactions ==
India was the first world power to react to the election results, saying in a congratulatory message to Putin that it vowed to push ties with Russia to a "higher level." Other countries which sent their congratulations included: Algeria, Azerbaijan, Armenia, Austria, Belarus, Bolivia, Bulgaria, Chad, Croatia, Cuba, Czech Republic, Democratic Republic of the Congo, Egypt, Guatemala, Hungary, China, Iran, Iraq, Israel, Japan, Kazakhstan, Kyrgyzstan, Latvia, Madagascar, Malaysia, Mexico, Moldova, North Korea, Philippines, Saudi Arabia, Serbia, Singapore, Sudan, Syria, Tajikistan, Turkey, Turkmenistan, United States, Uzbekistan and Venezuela.

Western reaction to the election result was predominantly muted as the election came at a time of heightened tensions between the West and Russia due to the poisoning of Sergei and Yulia Skripal, the ongoing U.S. investigation of the alleged Russian interference in the 2016 United States elections and a series of other issues. The European Union said that violations and shortcomings in the election flouted international standards while the White House deputy press secretary Hogan Gidley initially said that there was no congratulatory phone call scheduled between U.S. president Donald Trump and Vladimir Putin. Donald Trump later congratulated Putin in a phone call while the president of the European Commission Jean-Claude Juncker later congratulated Putin; their actions in turn drew criticism. France and Germany acknowledged Putin's victory but both countries avoided explicitly using the word "congratulate", instead "wishing success" to Putin for his new six-year term in office.

An example of ballot stuffing in Lyubertsy, Moscow Oblast

Voting irregularities were reported by an independent election monitoring group Golos. Edward Snowden criticized what he claimed was ballot stuffing and Russian opposition entities Alexei Navalny and Open Russia criticized what they alleged to be voting fraud. Ella Pamfilova, the head of the Central Electoral Commission, said that there were no serious violations and those involved in the violations would be caught; she later said that Putin's level of support showed that society had united in the face of pressure from abroad. According to one monitor group who observed voters in several voting stations which showed "suspicious" results in previous elections, the actual turnout at these stations was 21-34% while official results from these stations showed 76-86% (in one station 8,765 physical voters were counted, official results showed 13,235 votes). The group concluded that in these elections the government and local administration officers chose to simply falsify the voting protocols rather than use easy-to-spot ballot stuffing or carousel voting. Election statistician Sergey Shpilkin said that while this election was slightly "cleaner" than the preceding ones, there were around 10 million votes added in favor of Putin illegally.

Prominent Russian dissident Garry Kasparov said that the elections were a "charade."

The Organization for Security and Co-operation in Europe (OSCE) said that the election "took place in an overly controlled legal and political environment marked by continued pressure on critical voices, while the Central Election Commission (CEC) administered the election efficiently and openly."

The head observer of the Shanghai Cooperation Organisation described the election as "transparent, credible, democratic" while Maxim Grigoriev, deputy head of the monitoring group of the Civic Chamber of the Russian Federation called it "unprecedentedly clean".
