= 2017 Party of Growth presidential primaries =

Party of Growth presidential primaries, 2017
- From August to November, 2017
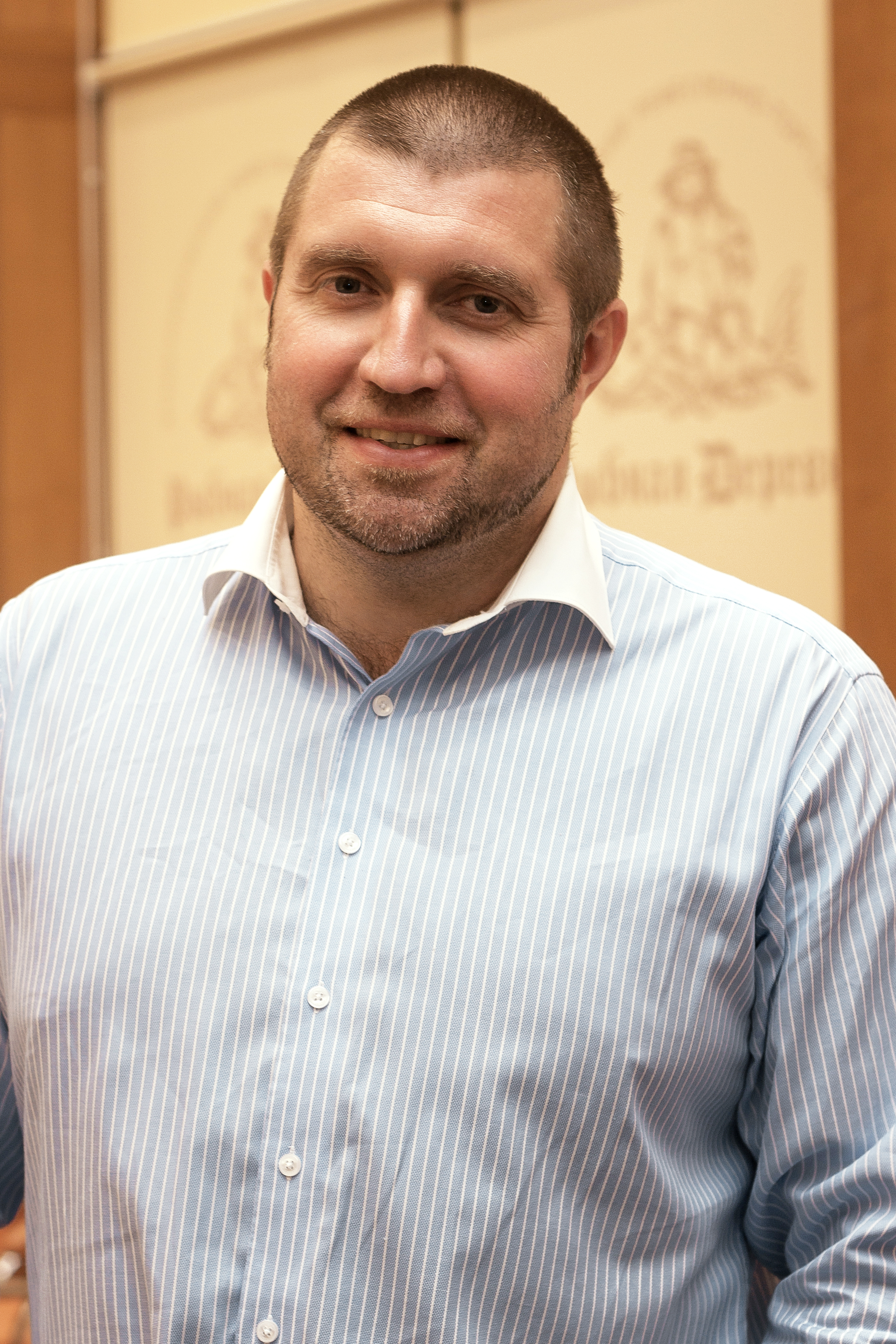

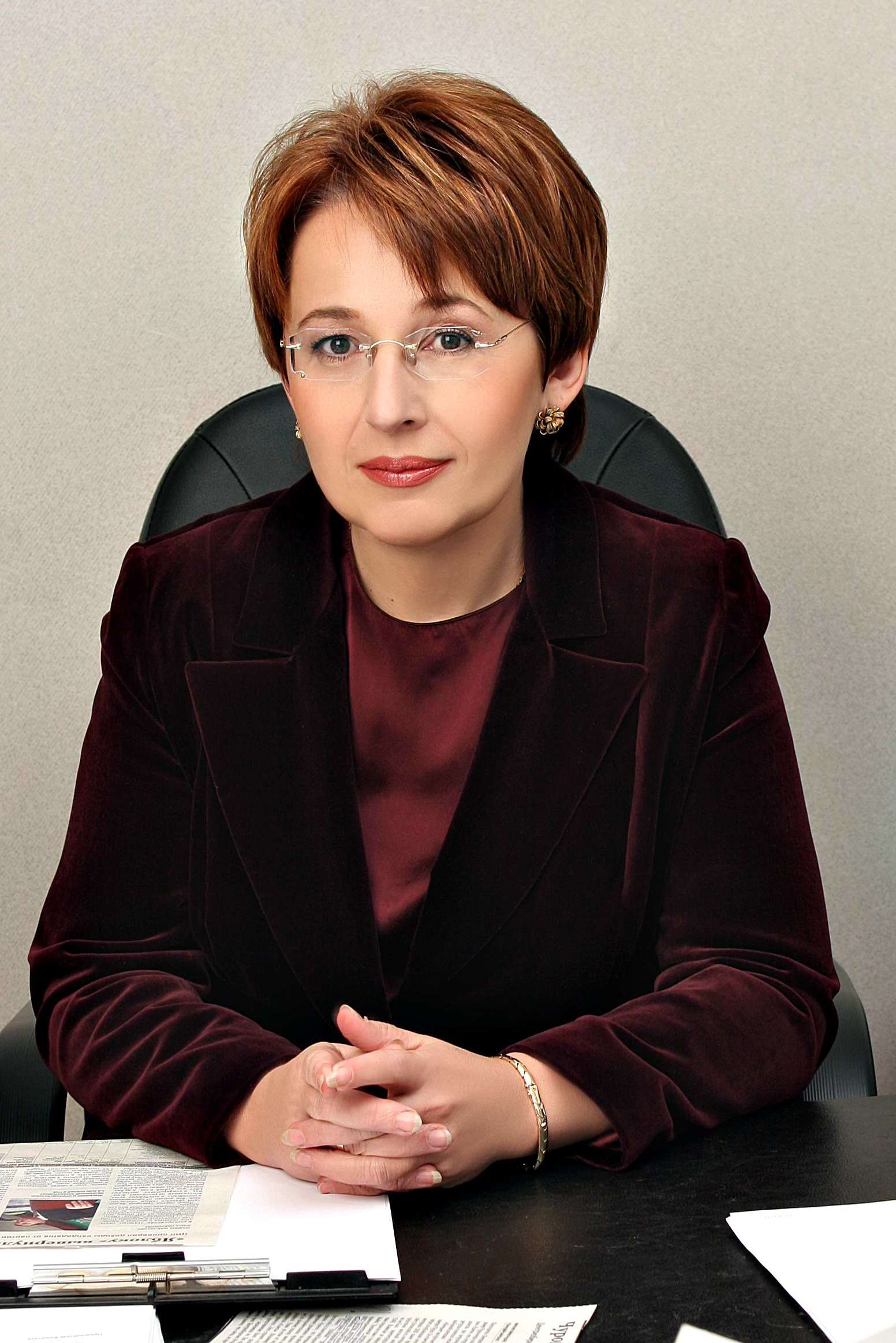

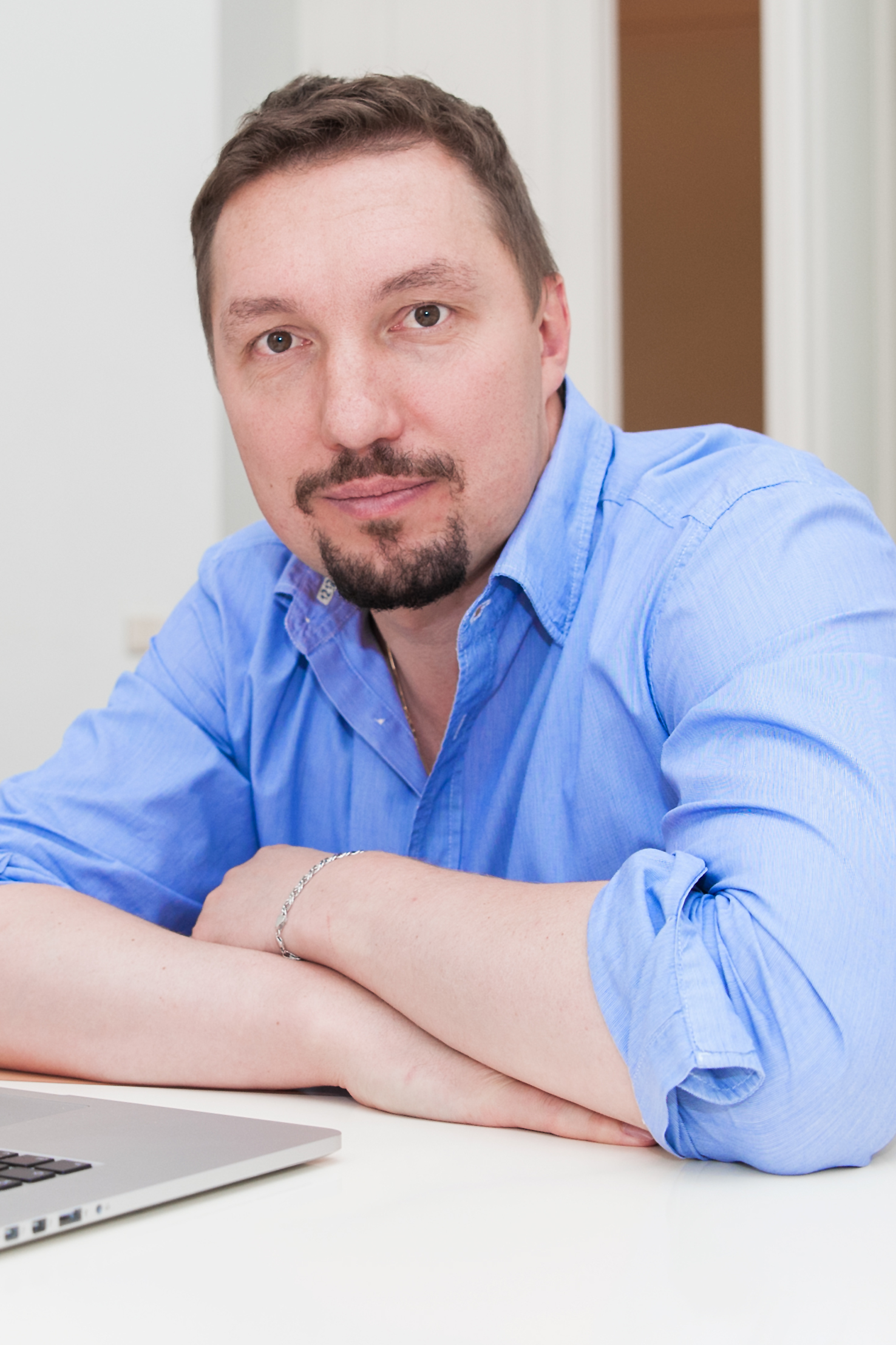

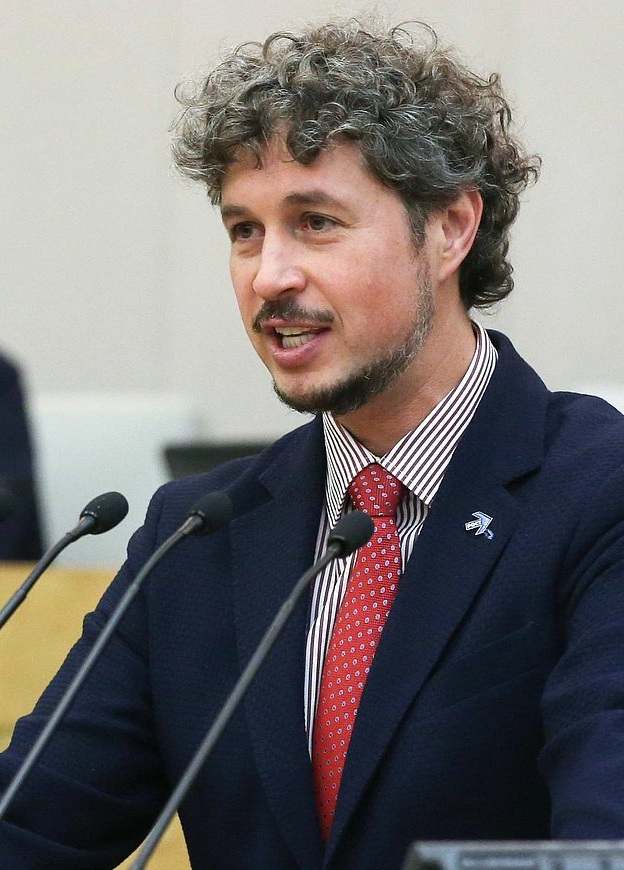
Candidate	Dmitry Potapenko	Oksana Dmitriyeva
Home state	Moscow	Saint Petersburg
Candidate	Dmitry Marinichev	Alexander Khurudzhi
Home state	Moscow	Rostov Oblast
Party of Growth nominee
Boris Titov

The 2017 Party of Growth presidential primaries is the selection process by which voters of the Party of Growth were to choose its potential nominee for President of Russia in the 2018 Russian presidential election. Voting for candidates took place via the internet.

== History ==
At the end of July 2017, the Party of Growth decided on the list of participants in the primaries.

On 10 August 2017, the party's press secretary told the media that the results of the primaries will be taken into account at the party congress which will be held to decide the candidate for Party of Growth; however, the winner of the primaries will not guarantee themselves the right to ballot on behalf of the party.

On 26 November 2017, it was announced that the party will nominate Boris Titov, who was not involved in the primaries. According to a person from the party leadership, none of the proposed candidates were able to obtain sufficient support.

== Candidates ==
Four candidates were nominated for the primaries.

Candidate	Office	Federal Subject
Oksana Dmitriyeva	Deputy of the Legislative Assembly of St. Petersburg (2016–present); Deputy of the State Duma (1999–2015); Minister of Labour and Social Development (1998)	Saint Petersburg
Dmitry Potapenko	Entrepreneur	Moscow
Dmitry Marinichev	Internet Ombudsman	Moscow
Alexander Khurudzhi	Entrepreneur	Rostov Oblast
