= Boris Titov 2018 presidential campaign =

Boris Titov for President
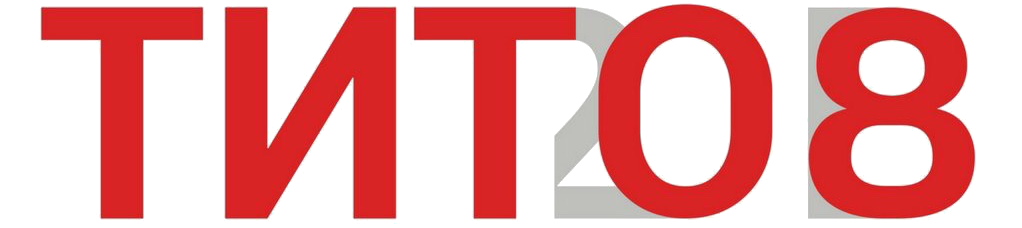
- Campaigned for: 2018 Russian presidential election
- Candidate: Boris Titov; Presidential Commissioner for Entrepreneurs’ Rights (2012–present)
- Affiliation: Party of Growth
- Status: Announced: 26 November 2017; Official nominee: 21 December 2017; Lost election: 18 March 2018
- Receipts: 20,700,040.00 roubles
- Website: boristitov2018.ru

The 2018 presidential campaign of Boris Titov was announced on 26 November 2017, during a meeting of the federal council of the Party of Growth in Abrau-Dyurso. Titov is a somewhat marginal figure in the world of Russian politics, with 87% of the country's citizens admitting that they have "never heard of Boris Titov" in a survey held in December 2017. Political analysts were quick to dismiss Titov's electoral chances and predicted that he will garner no more than 1.5% of the vote.

== Background ==
Initially the Party of Growth conducted primaries which were attended by four candidates: Oksana Dmitriyeva, Dmitry Potapenko, Dmitry Marinichev and Alexander Khurudzhi. Boris Titov did not participate in the primaries. However, at the meeting of the federal council of the party it was decided to nominate Titov. According to a person from the party leadership, none of the proposed candidates were able to obtain sufficient support.

== Campaign ==
According to Titov, the main task of participation in election is to promote the party's Growth Strategy economic program, which was prepared by the Stolypin Club and presented to President Vladimir Putin in May 2017. During the campaign Titov and his team intend to travel around the country to promote the program.

Titov was officially nominated by his party on December 21. He submitted to the CEC the documents required for registration the next day. Titov’s documents were approved by the CEC on 25 December, which meant that he could begin collecting signatures. A party spokesman commented that the collection signatures in support of Titov will begin in early January 2018.

=== Regional headquarters ===
Boris Titov's presidential campaign includes opening regional headquarters. The opening of the first regional headquarters was held on 27 December 2017 in Simferopol.

=== Main Campaign ===
Boris Titov conducts a pre-election journey across the country, combining it with the work of the Commissioner for Entrepreneurs’ Rights.

On 8 February Boris Titov visited Stavropol Krai. In particular Titov visited Pyatigorsk, where he attended the local market and spoke to traders. Later Boris Titov held a meeting with local entrepreneurs. Later Titov visited the industrial Park in Nevinnomyssk and held a meeting with Governor of Stavropol Krai Vladimir Vladimirov.

On 9 February Boris Titov visited Krasnodar Krai, where he visited Korenovsky dairy-canning plant. Later, in Krasnodar, he held a meeting with the Governor Veniamin Kondratyev, and also declared that made the decision to move from Moscow to Novorossiysk. According to him, he wants his taxes to go on the development of Novorossiysk and the village of Abrau-Dyurso.

On 12 February Boris Titov visited Gelendzhik in Krasnodar Krai, where he met with representatives of the local business. He discussed with entrepreneurs the development of the tourism industry not only in the Krasnodar Krai, but throughout Russia.

Also, on 12 February Titov visited Republic of Crimea, where he met with entrepreneurs and Head of the Republic Sergey Aksenov. On the same day Titov was going to visit Sevastopol, but was unable to do so due to weather conditions.

Boris Titov named the Program of social economic development of Russia till 2025 "Growth Strategy" developed by Stolypin Institute to be his presidential plan in case of his election.
