= Ksenia Sobchak 2018 presidential campaign =

Ksenia Sobchak Against All
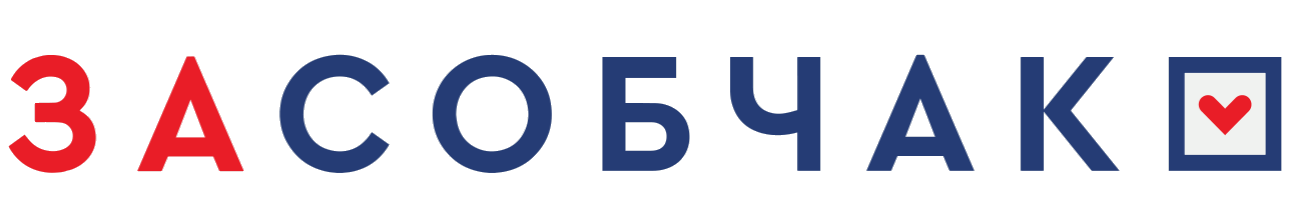
- Campaign: 2018 Russian presidential election
- Candidate: Ksenia Sobchak; TV anchor, journalist
- Affiliation: Civic Initiative
- Status: Announced; 19 October 2017; Presumptive nominee 15 November 2017; Official nominee 23 December 2017; Lost election: 18 March 2018
- Headquarters: Moscow
- Key people: Chief of staff: Igor Malashenko
- Receipts: 19,440,296.99 roubles
- Slogan(s): Против всех #Япротив; Against All #I'mAgainst!

Website
- sobchakprotivvseh.ru

The 2018 presidential campaign of Ksenia Sobchak was announced in a YouTube video, on 19 October 2017.

Sobchak from the beginning of her campaign billed herself as the "candidate against all". In Russia the option to vote for "none of the above" (literally "against all") on a federal level (i.e. in presidential elections and elections to the State Duma) was abolished in 2006.

== Announcement and nomination ==
Rumors about the nomination of Ksenia Sobchak in the 2018 election appeared a month before she officially announced that she would run for president.

Sobchak announced that she would run for President on 19 October 2017, in a YouTube video. In the video, Sobchak described herself as a candidate "against all", because since the 2004 election, the "against all" option (or "none of the above" as it is more commonly known in English-speaking countries) has been excluded from the ballot, and Sobchak wanted to give people the opportunity to again vote "against all". At the same time, Sobchak said she would withdraw her candidacy if Alexei Navalny was registered as a candidate by the Central Election Commission.

Originally Sobchak put herself forward as an independent candidate. In this case she would have had to collect at least 300,000 signatures in order to be admitted to the election. Soon after, however, Sobchak's campaign team said that would be nominated by a political party, namely the People's Freedom Party or Civic Initiative.

On 15 November 2017, it was announced that Sobchak would be nominated by Civil Initiative at its convention in December.

On 23 December 2017, at the Civic Initiative convention Ksenia Sobchak was officially nominated for president. On the same day, Sobchak joined the party.

== Campaign ==
=== Regional headquarters ===
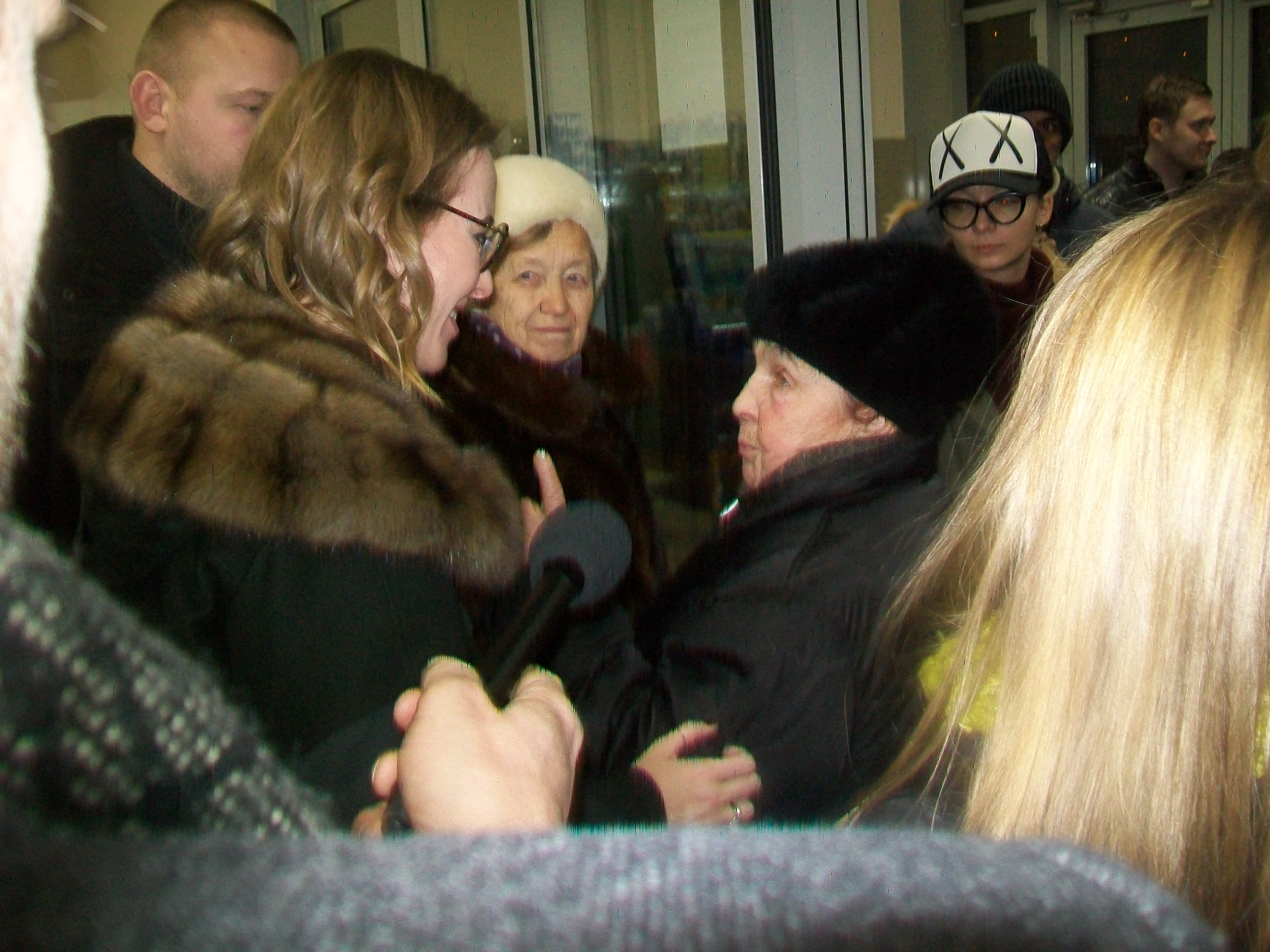
Ksenia Sobchak speaks with a pensioner during a trip to Yekaterinburg on 16 December 2017

Kseniya Sobchak's presidential campaign includes opening regional headquarters and holding meetings with voters in different cities. The opening of the first regional headquarters was held on 29 November 2017 in Rostov-on-Don. At one point during the campaign, the headquarters was vandalized, with even graffiti which included words such as "Jew is not a President" being scrawled on a wall.

Opening of regional headquarters and meeting with voters
Date	Place	Head
29 November 2017	Rostov-on-Don	Anastasia Shevchenko
2 December 2017	Saint Petersburg	Nikolay Artyomenko
6 December 2017	Nizhny Novgorod	Ilya Nikolayev
12 December 2017	Saratov	Anastasia Moskaleva
16 December 2017	Yekaterinburg	Yevgeny Ron

== People ==
=== Campaign staff ===
Ksenia Sobchak's campaign manager was Igor Malashenko. In 1996, Malashenko worked in the election staff of Boris Yeltsin, where he was engaged in working with the media.

Andrey Movchan and Vladislav Inozemtsev were responsible for Sobchak's economic program.

Also involved in the campaign was Vitaly Shklyarov, who had experience working as an advisor for political campaigns abroad (including campaigns for Angela Merkel, Barack Obama and Bernie Sanders), and was responsible for Sobchak's online campaign. Videos and the YouTube channel were managed by filmmaker Sergey Kalvarsky. Rustem Adagamov was responsible for the social media campaign.

=== Policy advisors ===
Sobchak's chief political consultant was her colleague from television channel TV Rain Stanislav Belkovsky.

=== Communications ===
Sobchak's press secretary was Ksenia Chudinova.

Alexey Sitnikov was initially responsible for collecting signatures and working with volunteers, however, he and his team soon quit.

== Political positions ==
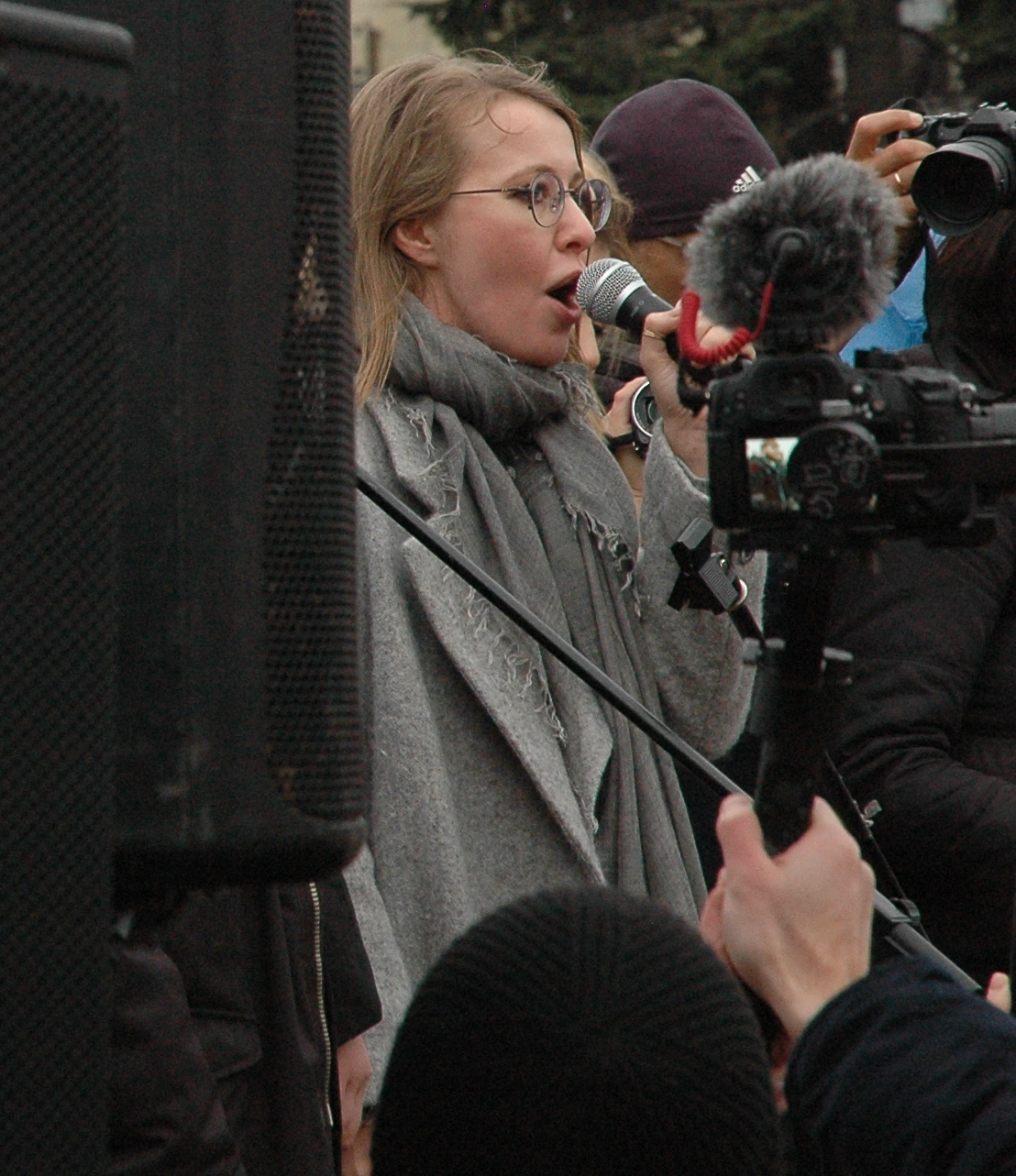
Sobchak campaigning in St. Petersburg in November 2017

=== Economic views ===
Sobchak is a supporter of free-market capitalism and privatization. Outlining her economic views, she writes:

"Russia is a country of a free economy with a strong state sector. All large state corporations should be privatized with antitrust restrictions. The state should not control any sectors of the economy, the state's share in enterprises and industries should be limited to breaking up monopolies. Private property should be protected by law, the review of any ownership and nationalization are possible only on a reimbursable basis on the basis of independent market valuations. Reform of tax and regulatory legislation and practices should stimulate the development of private entrepreneurship, small and medium-sized businesses, technological and innovative development of enterprises, education. The list of licensed branches of the economy should be significantly reduced."

=== Views on patriotism and nationalism ===
Sobchak describes herself as a patriot and a nationalist. However, she believes that much of the patriotism in Russia today is artificial. She writes, contrasting patriotism unfavorably with the situation in Israel: "Israel, in my opinion, is a hymn to the power of the human spirit... Patriotism, not imposed from above, but born within a person. And that's another amazing thing. This sense of the importance of your life for the state [in Israel] is created by many more small, as if imperceptible actions... And these little details are much more valuable than all the spirit-lifting speeches on May Day and Victory Day. And I sit, listen and feel bitter from the fact that in my home country all this is not".

=== Views on feminism ===
Sobchak describes herself as a feminist. In her manifesto, she derides the lack of women's representation in industry and politics. "Almost 500 heavy professions in Russia are officially closed to women. But among all the others - the salary of a woman is almost 30% less than that of a man. Among the most important companies in the country, women head only about 5%. ... In any case, half the country's population deserves a female voice for the first time in 14 years in these allegedly male games."

=== On the status of Crimea ===
Ksenia Sobchak said that the unconditional return of Crimea to Ukraine is impossible. However, she also said that, having annexed Crimea from Ukraine in 2014, Russia violated the 1994 Budapest Memorandum; she claimed on 24 October 2017 that "Under these agreements, we agreed that Crimea is Ukrainian, which is the most important to me". Sobchak stressed that she did not consider the issue with Crimea resolved. "I believe that these things need to be discussed, it is very important to discuss them....look for some ways out." She also added that "the most important thing that Russia and Ukraine should do now is to restore our friendship at any cost." Simultaneously she suggested to hold a new referendum on the status of Crimea after "a broad and equal campaign."

=== Other views ===
Sobchak has said that if elected president, she would remove the body of Vladimir Lenin from Red Square, since, in her opinion, this is an indicator of a "medieval way of life in the country... so the corpse of Lenin must be removed from Red Square." Sobchak's proposal has led to widespread criticism, with Communist Party leader Gennady Zyuganov stating: "It's tragic for the country when Ksenia and the like appear, who do not respect the will of this great country."

== Developments ==
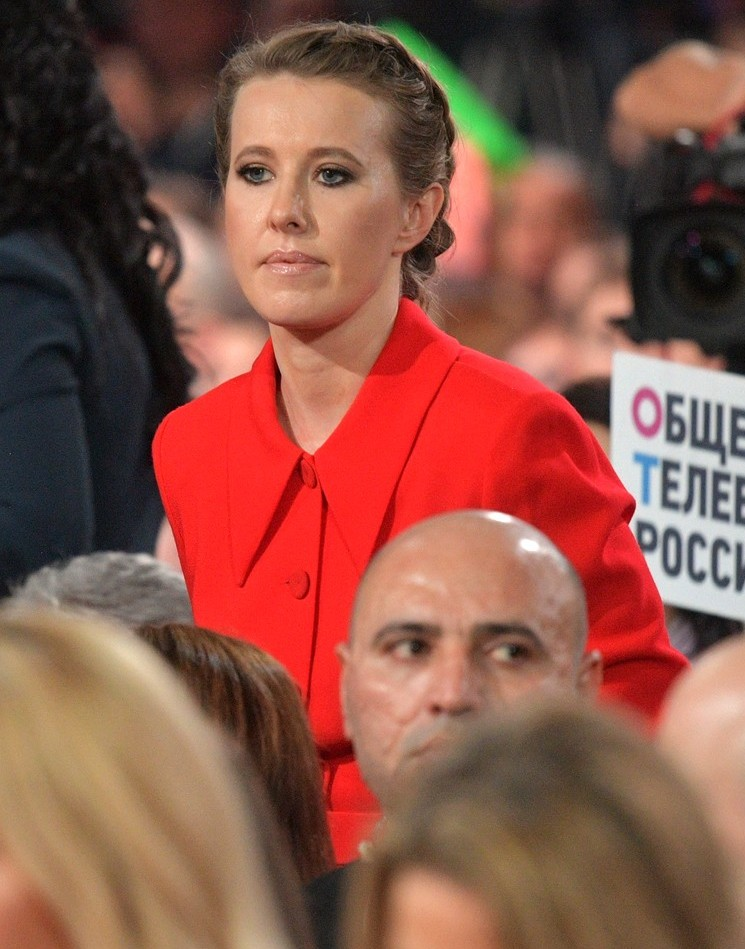
Sobchak questions Putin at his 2017 press conference

Sobchak, as a reporter, confronted Putin on December 14 at his annual press conference. She asked him why there was a strong lack of political competition and why Navalny is not being permitted to run. In his response, Putin criticized Sobchack's candidacy asking, "You're running under the slogan 'Against All'. Is that really a positive programme? What are you offering?"

Sobchak traveled to the United States in order to make an appeal to expatriate voters living there.

On February 28, during the first debate with several candidates, Sobchak chastised Vladimir Zhirinovsky for interrupting Sergey Baburin. In reply, Zhirinovsky angrily uttered expletives at Sobchak (reportedly, amongst other pejoratives, calling her a "fucking whore" and a "crazy bitch"). In response, Sobchak threw water at Zhirinovsky. On March 4, while she was campaigning in Moscow in sub-zero temperatures, Sobchak was drenched with water by a supporter of Zhirinovsky, who was intending to retaliate for Sobchak's interaction with Zhirinovsky at the debate.

On March 15, Sobchak announced that after the election she would be forming a new political party named the "Party of Changes", planning to partner with Gennady Gudkov to create the party. On the day of the election, Sobchak visited, and got into an argument with Navalny, who she urged to join her party.
