= Grigory Yavlinsky 2000 presidential campaign =

- Campaign: 2000 Russian presidential election
- Candidate: Grigory Yavlinsky; Leader of Yabloko (1993–2008); Deputy Chairman of the Committee on the Operational Management of the Economy of the Soviet Union (1991); Deputy of the State Duma
- Affiliation: Yabloko

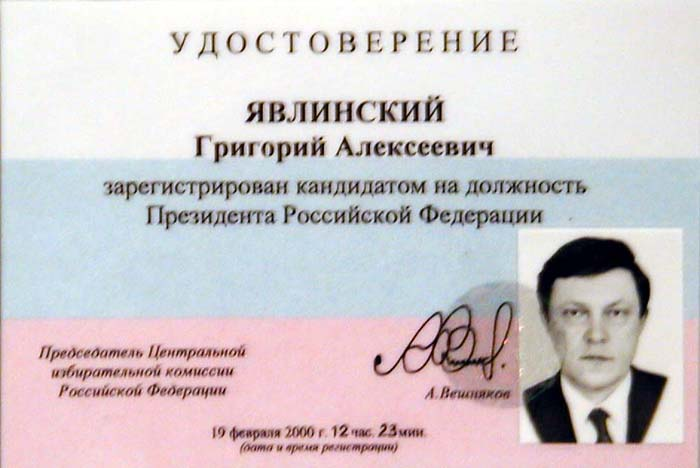
Identity card of Yavlinsky as presidential candidate.

The Grigory Yavlinsky presidential campaign, 2000 was Grigory Yavlinsky's campaign in the 2000 Russian presidential election. Yavlinsky ran as the nominee of Yabloko. This was Yavlinsky's second presidential bid, as he had been a candidate in the previous presidential election.

== Early developments ==
Before the emergence of Putin, Yavlinsky and Zyuganov been regarded as the only two prospective candidates to be supported by a strong constituency and a national party. However, Yavlinsky's appeal was limited, as his base of support overwhelmingly came from intellectuals and those in the upper middle class. Additionally, his limited experience in government was seen by analysts as a potential hindrance to his prospects, as it was believed that Russian voters wanted to vote for an individual who could "get things done", rather than someone who simply appealed to them on an ideological basis.

In 1998 a limited number of polls showed Yavlinsky as one of the top-two candidates.

Polls consistently indicated that Yavlinsky would win in a runoff against Zyuganov. However, polls also consistently indicated that Yavlinsky would lose in a runoff against Yevgeny Primakov.

However, by late 1999 Vladimir Putin had arisen as the vast frontrunner and Yavlinsky's fortunes had faded. This reality was cemented when Yabloko underperformed in the 1999 legislative election.

Entering his presidential campaign, Yavlinsky's popularity was the lowest it had ever been. His image had been badly damaged during Yabloko's campaign in the 1999 legislative elections. During the autumn of 1999, Yavlinsky had wavered in his stance on the Chechen War and performed very poorly in heavily-watched televised debates.

== Campaign ==
Yavlinsky blamed Yabloko's poor performance in the preceding 1999 legislative election on a weak campaign strategy and a poor image, believing that he himself was ineffective in reaching voters on his own. Thus, Yavlinsky released control of his presidential campaign strategy to others.

Yavlinsky attempted to position himself as the candidate for Russia's democratic movements, and, as a presidential candidate, returned to his steadfast opposition to the handling of the Chechen War. However, he nevertheless was struggling to even retain the support of Yabloko's own base of support (which was estimated to comprise roughly 5% of the Russian electorate).

With much of the media being loyal to Putin, they provided very unflattering coverage of Yavlinsky. For instance, they publicized press conferences help by a group called "gays for Yavlinsky" (part of Putin's "dirty tricks" to decrease the appeal of Yavlinsky, as homosexuality was not widely approved of by the Russian public). The ORT network not only aired reports that drew a connection between the Yavlinsky campaign and the homosexual community (alleging that they were one of the primary groups supporting him), but it also alleged that Jews and foreigners were two other groups that comprised Yavlinsky's primary base of support (hoping to harm Yavlinsky's appeal to voters harboring antisemitic or xenophobic sentiments).

In February Yavlinsky reiterated his intent to combat Putin's campaign declaring,

I intend to fight Putin for the post of Russian president. I will fight the man under whose half year in power the dirtiest and most repulsive campaign tactics in the history of Russia have been used. It is under Putin that an anti-terrorist operation gave way to total war with huge numbers of victims. It is under Putin that an open union between the Kremlin, Communists and nationalists has been formed. It is under Putin that an assault on freedom of the press has begun.

Yavlinsky had hired campaign experts who masterminded an attempt to drastically overhaul his image using television advertisements. Yavlinsky's campaign bombarded voters with advertisements in the last two weeks of the election. These ads used slogans such as "Reason, Will, Result". A number of the ads attempted to show a personal side of Yavlinsky in an attempt to soften his image. Yavlinsky also ran attack ads against Putin, most notably one which questioned his KGB history (the pro-Putin television channel ORT refused to run this ad). While the ads were highly visible, they failed to help improve Yavlinsky's image. Some observers argued that by bombarding voters with advertisements for his candidacy, he created voter fatigue around his candidacy.

With his campaign focusing their efforts on its television advertisements, it neglected to allot resources to local campaign organizations, thus depriving the campaign of leafleting, locally distributed materials, and monitoring of polling places.

The measured approach which Yavlinsky proposed to resolve Russia's economic ills failed to appeal to a populace that widely desired immediate solutions to its economic crisis. The lack of a strong middle class hampered the appeal of many of Yavlinsky policies. Russia's political polarization hindered the appeal of Yavlinsky's relatively centrist politics. Additionally, many were off put by Yavlinsky's reputation as a half-Jewish intellectual.

Independent candidate Yevgeny Savostyanov, who had been polling under 1% and had garnered very little attention, held a press conference in which he announced his withdrawal from the race, throwing his support behind Yavlinsky's candidacy (and urging Konstantin Titov to do the same).

In a last-ditch effort during the final days of the campaign, Yavlinsky declared his willingness to establish a vast coalition of liberal movements in cooperation with figures such as Yegor Gaidar and Anatoly Chubais. Chubais disregarded this as having come far too late.

=== Outcome and concession ===
After the election, Yavlinsky declared that his campaign had, "achieved what we wanted: we have demonstrated that there are millions of people behind us who support what we are talking about." He also declared that he hoped to establish a broader coalition for right-wing opposition to the Putin's administration.

== Platform and positions ==
In regards to social issues, Yavlinsky occupied the political left. In terms of economic issues, Yavlinksy occupied the far-right of the Russian political spectrum. His politics could be classified as liberal-democratic.

Yavlinsky had long been a figure who supported democratic and free market reforms, but opposed the course of actions which Yeltsin's regime had taken to implement reforms.

Unlike other major political parties in Russia, Yavlinsky's Yabloko had consistently opposed military actions in Chechnya. This was a position that had often placed the party at odds with prevailing public sentiments. In 2000, Yavlinsky was the only presidential candidate who was opposed to the war. Renown human rights activist Sergei Kovalev endorsed Yavlinsky because of his stance against the war.

Commenting on the Second Chechen War Yavlinsky stated,

The conflict began as an anti-terrorist operation. Now it has turned into a war against the people…It is a crime because thousands of people have been killed and this war has no future, no political solution.

Yavlinsky ran as a free marketer but with measured state control. He wanted stronger oversight of public money, an end to the black market and reform of the tax system coinciding with an increase in public services. He also advocated for a strengthened role for the Duma and a reduction in the size of the civil bureaucracy. He was the most pro-Western candidate, but only to an extent: he had been critical of the war in Chechnya but remained skeptical of NATO.

== See also ==
- Grigory Yavlinsky presidential campaign, 1996
- Grigory Yavlinsky presidential campaign, 2012
- Grigory Yavlinsky presidential campaign, 2018
