= Sergey Baburin 2018 presidential campaign =

Sergey Baburin for President
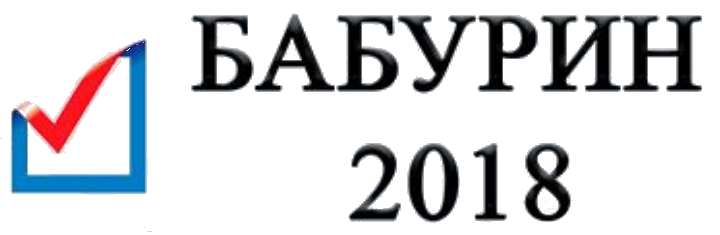
- Campaign: 2018 Russian presidential election
- Candidate: Sergey Baburin; Deputy of the State Duma (1994–2000 and 2003–2007)
- Affiliation: Russian All-People's Union
- Status: Announced; 4 October 2017; Official nominee 22 December 2017; Lost election: 18 March 2018
- Slogan: Sergey Baburin — The True Russian

Website
- baburin2018.ru

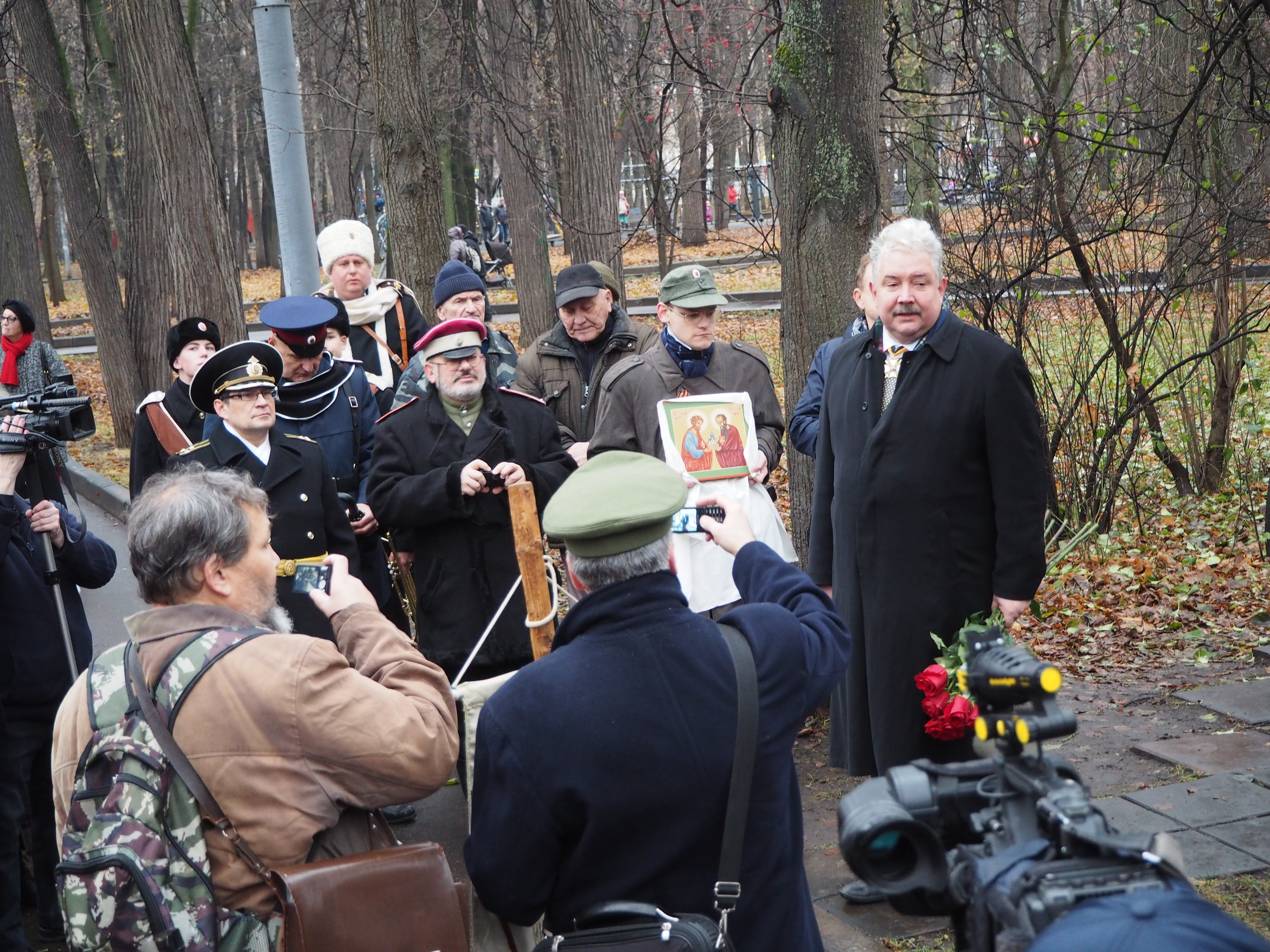
Baburin during the action in memory of the heroes of the World War I, 11 November 2017

The 2018 presidential campaign of Sergey Baburin was announced at a press conference of the Presidium of the Central Council of the party Russian All-People's Union on 4 October 2017.

In November, Sergey Baburin was one from 77 candidates proposed by the Left Front as the single presidential candidate from the left opposition. The results of the voting on the website of the Left front Baburin scored 138 votes.

Officially, Sergey Baburin was nominated at the party congress on 22 December 2017. On 24 December Baburin filed registration documents with the CEC. But CEC rejected Baburin's bid on 25 December because it identified violations in the information provided regarding 18 of his party's 48 representatives. On 29 December Baburin again resubmitted the documents and they were approved by the CEC.

== Campaign ==
=== Collection of signatures ===
Russian All-People's Union started to collect signatures in favor of Baburin on 9 January 2018. Signatures were collected in 56 federal subjects.

Support for Baburin has raised more than 128 thousand signatures. On 30 January 2018 Sergey Baburin handed over the signatures to the CEC. When testing revealed only 3.28% of invalid signatures, due to which Sergey Baburin was admitted to the election.

== Program ==
On 3 February 2018, Sergey Baburin has published his election program. It was called "Russian Way to the Future!" and consists of 9 points:

1. For Great Russia — Decent power. The resignation of the government of Dmitry Medvedev. The formation of a new government of the most authoritative among the population of politicians and professional managers.

2. Constitutional reform is the main condition for moving forward. The constitutional reform aimed at changing the current political system, the strengthening and development of all its institutions, improving the legal framework and practice of elections at all levels, taking into account historical traditions and national features of Russia.

3. A strong economy is a guarantee of stability of the state. The development and adoption of a set of laws that will gradually overcome oil dependence and to return to the state of its social obligations to the people. Protectionist policies in the development sectors of the economy; stimulation of development of small and medium businesses in the sphere of material production and services; extensive development of the cooperative movement, primarily the organization of agricultural processing, consumer, supply and other cooperatives and high-priority development of domestic firms based on national capital.

4. Free to teach and to heal is social responsibility of the state. The return of health and education of the service sector is among the priority social tasks of the state. Return to the best examples of Soviet education; cancellation of the Unified State Exam; recovery of vocational education; the blocking of the adoption is planned by the Ministry of Education reforms, which will deprive the country of human capacity for technological breakthrough. The cease-fold reduction in public assistance health care, which closed the clinic, but the medicine itself becomes unavailable to the majority of Russians; the increase in the funds allocated to health care; introduction of state regulation of prices for medicines for the poor and retirees; the tightening of legislation in the sphere of turnover of alcohol and tobacco products.

5. The poverty of the people – shame on the government! In the social sector will focus on legislative measures to combat the growing poverty and glaring inequality of property of citizens, namely: the support of the least protected groups of the population by immediate and significant increases in the minimum wage level; ensuring adequate indexation of pensions; the introduction of minimum standards of budget financing of culture, science, education and health, as well as the minimum salary level of workers in these sectors.

6. The future of Russia in the spiritual and moral purification of society. In the cultural sphere consider the necessary legislative initiatives aimed at: the revival and development of cultures and languages of all the fraternal peoples of Russia, based on common spiritual values of the Russian national mentality of relying on world heritage; conservation of cultural heritage and the best national traditions, acquired by Russia during the whole history of its existence, given the Soviet and post-Soviet period; strengthening of state support of professional art and Amateur art, cultural institutions of all levels; extension activities on the conservation and restoration of objects of cultural heritage of pre-revolutionary and Soviet eras, monuments, Orthodox centers, contributing to spiritual revival of the nation.

7. Cozy in every home – comfortable in the country. In the sphere of housing and communal services should: strengthen national control over the condition of the housing stock; the adoption of legislative measures to curb the growth of tariffs of natural monopolies, which leads to higher prices for housing and communal services; dramatically increased responsibility of organizations and experts engaged in the provision of normal functioning of the housing sector; the adoption of laws to promote the efficiency of the system housing.

8. The migration process under fair and transparent control of the state! In the sphere of migration to Russia's security requires: an additional, better equipping the external border of the country; the introduction of strict visa regime with the countries-suppliers of mass illegal and unskilled labor; controlling the saturation of the national labor market by setting a periodic temporary moratoriums on attracting unskilled foreign labor to the enterprises of trade, public catering, construction, transport and housing; direct prohibition to work temporarily in the territory of the Russian Federation of the foreigners in the institutions related to medical and social services to the population; social guarantees to any running, including migrants who have legally arrived in Russia; the introduction of criminal liability of employers for employment of illegal migrants.

9. Develop international community — building Russia! In foreign policy, it is expected to focus on strengthening Russia's geopolitical position in the Eurasian continent, to promote the development of the Crimea as legitimate Russian territory. To take parliamentary measures for strengthening and further development of the Union State of Belarus and Russia and the Eurasian Economic Union, to strengthen the leading role of Russia in the framework of the Shanghai Cooperation Organisation and BRICS. A special place takes the problem of the Russian world, primarily in the conflict zone in Donetsk and Luhansk and Transnistria.

== Result ==
Results of Sergey Baburin by federal subjects

Sergey Baburin lost the election, gaining 0.65% and took last place.

Baburin received the greatest support in the Chechen Republic (1.18%) and Omsk Oblast (1.13%), in all other regions he received less than 1% of the vote.
