= Grigory Yavlinsky 1996 presidential campaign =

1996 Russian presidential campaign

- Campaign: 1996 Russian presidential election
- Candidate: Grigory Yavlinsky; Leader of Yabloko (1993–2008); Deputy Chairman of the Committee on the Operational Management of the Economy of the Soviet Union (1991); Deputy of the State Duma
- Affiliation: Yabloko
- Status: Nominated: 27 January 1996; Registered: 19 April 1996; Lost election: 16 June 1996

Grigory Yavlinsky campaigned for president in the 1996 Russian presidential election as the nominee of Yabloko. Running as a socially liberal, politically centrist, and democratic-minded candidate, he was eliminated after placing fourth in the first-round of the election. He subsequently gave his endorsement to Boris Yeltsin in the second-round of the election.

== Background ==
Yavlinsky's Yabloko party had competed in both the 1993 and 1995 legislative elections.

At one point in 1993 Yavlinsky polled as the politician most trusted by the Russian public.

During the 1995 legislative elections, Yavlinsky downplayed his party's efforts in order to focus on organizing his presidential campaign, viewing winning the presidency as far more of an important objective than winning in Russia's relatively weak legislature.

Despite having made efforts to grow its base of support and establish regional organizations, Yabloko was still a Moscow-centric party. While it had obtained a number of strong regional figures, the overwhelming majority of high-profile party activists were muscovites.

Yavlinsky had performed well in early polls for the presidential elections conducted in 1994 and 1995, being ahead of both Yeltsin and his main rival Zyuganov in most of them, as well as in 1996 hypothetical polls for second round runoff.

== Campaign ==
Yavlinsky officially accepted Yabloko's nomination on January 27.

Yavlinsky's campaign platform appealed to pro-reform voters. This meant that he was competing with Yeltsin, Lebed, and Fyodorov's campaigns, which similarly aimed to capture pro-reform voters.

In mid-march Yavlinsky delivered what was, up to that point, the most strongly anti-communist speech of his campaign. Yavilinsky stated that a communist victory would threaten Russian's rights to practice free speech and own property. He quoted the communists own program, which stated "The aim of the Russian Communist party is the Communist future of the whole of mankind." Yavlinsky warned, "If the Communists come to power, things will only get worse" He predicted that Zhirinosky would withdraw from the race before the election, benefiting the two frontrunners (Zyuganov and Yeltsin). He predicted that, if no other major changes occurred, Zyuganov was going to win the election. Yavlinsky promised to withdraw his candidacy if another qualified candidate entered the race. He mentioned Boris Nemtsov, who had already declined to run, as one individual he'd step aside for.

At the beginning of April, a committee was formed by a number of reformist leaders to support, and unify around, Yavlinsky's candidacy. The committee was formed by Yelena Bonner (wife of Andrei Sakharov), Sergei Kovalev, Ella Pamfilova and Arkady Murashev. They supported Yavilnsky as offering an alternative to Yeltsin, and proclaimed Yavlinsky's to have the best chance at defeating Zyuganov. In supporting Yavlinsky, Democratic Choice of Russia members Kovalev and Murashev had broken from the leadership of their party.

Yavlinsky's candidacy received a moderate level of media coverage, particularly in the international press. However, aiming to boost Yeltsin's prospects, many the Russian media outlets largely downplayed its coverage of Yavlinsky and other candidates.

Yavlinsky made very few campaign trips. This was in contrast to a number of other candidates that had traveled extensively for their own campaigns. Consequently, Yavlinsky neglected to visit many parts of Russia. For instance, near the end of the campaign, Yabloko's local campaign organization in the city of Perm had been begging Yalinsky to visit the city, but he declined to do so. Yeltsin, who unlike Yavlinsky had actively campaigned in Perm, ultimately pulled-off a surprise upset over Zyuganov there.

== Platform and positions ==
In regards to social issues, Yavlinsky occupied the political left. In terms of economic issues, Yavlinksy occupied the far-right of the Russian political spectrum. His ideology most strongly appealed to Russia's population of young intellectuals. His politics could be classified as liberal-democratic.

Yavlinsky's proposed presidential program focused a great amount on his plans to end the conflict in Chechya. Yavlinsky was strongly against the military conflict in Chechnya. This aspect of his platform appealed strongly to many democratic voters. Unlike other major political parties in Russia, Yavlinsky's Yabloko had consistently opposed the Chechen War. This was a position that had often placed the party at odds with prevailing public sentiments. However, by 1996 Yeltsin's handling of the conflict had become unpopular, creating an opportunity for opponents such as Yavkinsky to capitalize on the unpopularity of Yeltsin's war.

Yavlinsky's platform included antidiscrimination protections for ethnic and religious minorities.

By 1995, in an effort to further differentiate themselves from Democratic Choice of Russia, Yabloko had begun to avoid explicitly presenting itself as a pro-Western party.

Yavlinsky had opposed Yeltsin's 1993 constitution, as he believed it restructured the government to have a far too authoritarian executive branch. Yavkinsky opposed reductions of civil freedoms, and stood in strong opposition to the establishment of an authoritarian leadership.

Yavlinsky aimed to honor government commitments to citizens' social security.

Yavlinsky promised economic relief for the middle class that was neglected during Yeltsin's economic reforms.

Yavlinsky described the sort of individual that he believed might be drawn to Yabloko's platform by saying,

"We appeal, in the first place, to those who have suffered the most from the reforms, however, have not lost the faith and believe that there exists a way out of the current predicament. We appeal to the middle class, primarily to those who receive their wages from the state budget.

Yavlinsky long had been a figure who supported democratic and free market reforms, but opposed the course of actions which Yeltsin's regime had taken to implement reforms. Yabloko's economic platform sought to focus on a different order of priorities than both Yeltsin's regime and other democratic opposition parties had. Yavlinsky had declared,

As far as economic policy is concerned, the most important task for us is to create a singleeconomic space embracing the entire CIS, to demonopolize the economy, to promote the development of a competitive medium, to make it so that proper ownership relations established in the country (in the sphere of land ownership first of all), to make it so that economic reforms develop from grass roots, not from top down. With regard to the majority of issues our colleagues (other democratic parties) suggest a different order of priorities.

Yavlinsky advocated the creation of a flat tax.

Yavlinsky advocated for a more transparent, responsible, and efficient budget policy.

Yavlinsky proposed undertaking a campaign to exterminate corruption in government.

Yavlinsky advocated that there was a need for policies aimed at supporting small and medium-sized businesses.

Yabloko is a programmatic party, as opposed to a populist one. This proved to be a weakness for Yavlinsky's campaign, as he and his party opted to maintain their long-established party positions on many issues, rather than reshaping their agenda in order to better capitalize on the political tides. This had also been the case in the preceding 1995 electoral campaign, during which Yabloko similarly had opted to focus on complex economic issues, rather than focusing on bread and butter issues.

== Third force negotiations ==
Up until early May, Yavlinsky unsuccessfully attempted to negotiate the creation of a third force coalition, with negotiations largely centering on a coalition between himself and fellow candidates Alexander Lebed and Svyatoslav Fyodorov.

Yavlinsky received some criticism for this, with some arguing such a coalition could act as a spoiler, weakening Yeltsin to Zyuganov's advantage.

== See also ==
- Grigory Yavlinsky presidential campaign, 2000
- Grigory Yavlinsky presidential campaign, 2012
- Grigory Yavlinsky presidential campaign, 2018
