= Alexander Khurudzhi =

Russian businessman

Aleksandr Khurudzhi
- Александр Хуруджи
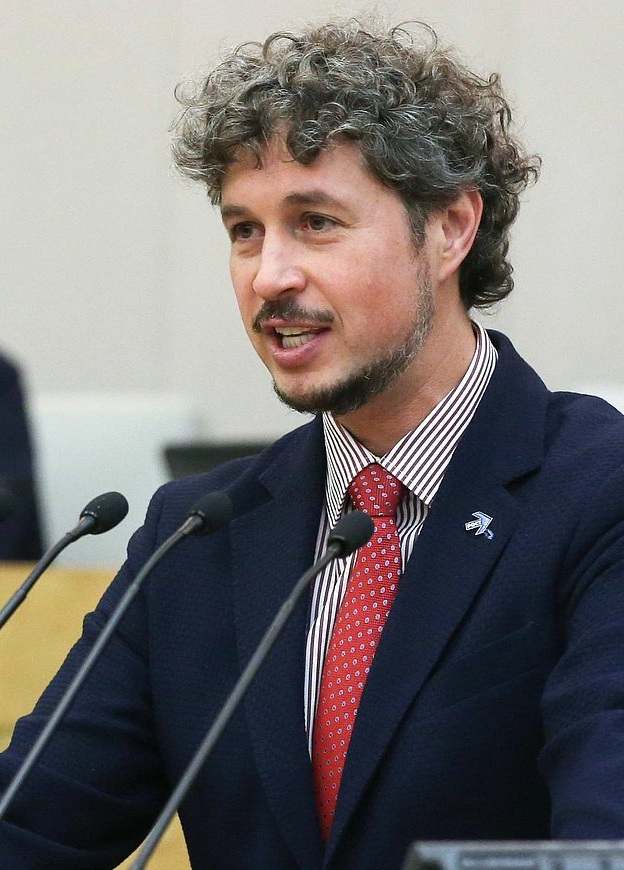
- Khurudzhi in 2018

Public Commissioner for the Protection of the Rights of Entrepreneurs Held in Custody (under the Presidential Commissioner for Entrepreneurs’ Rights)
- Incumbent
- Assumed office 2017

Head of the Human Rights Committee New People
- Incumbent
- Assumed office 2021

Federal Secretary / Regional leader Party of Growth
- Incumbent
- Assumed office circa 2016

Personal details
- Born: 6 November 1975 (age 50) Rostov-on-Don, Russian SFSR, Soviet Union
- Party: New People (previously Party of Growth)
- Occupation: Entrepreneur, human rights activist, politician

Alexander Aleksandrovich Khurudzhi (Russian: Александр Александрович Хуруджи; born 6 November 1975) is a Russian entrepreneur, public figure, and human rights activist. He is known for his work in the energy sector, particularly as a shareholder and former chairman of the board of directors of the electricity grid company AO "Energia", and for his subsequent advocacy on behalf of entrepreneurs facing criminal prosecution.

== Early life and education ==
Khurudzhi was born on 6 November 1975 in Rostov-on-Don into a family of engineers. His father, Alexander Semyonovich Khurudzhi, was an inventor who participated in aerospace projects including Sea Launch, Proton, and Buran.

He graduated from the Don Law Institute in 1998 with a degree in civil law and civil procedure. He later obtained a technical degree in mechanical engineering technology from Don State Technical University (1999) and an economics degree in banking from the North Caucasus Institute of Business (2009). He also completed a governors’ management retraining program at Rostov State University of Economics (RINH).

== Business career ==
Khurudzhi began entrepreneurial activities in the 1990s, working in legal services, construction, trade, and the electricity sector. In 2006 he acquired the financially distressed electricity grid company "Energia" (founded in 1974). Under his leadership the company was restored to profitability; it provided electricity transmission services, transformer repair and production, construction work, and related activities, and was treated as a pilot project for long-term tariff regulation. From around 2008 he served as chairman of the board of directors and remained a major shareholder.

== Criminal case and acquittal ==
In December 2015 Khurudzhi was arrested on charges of large-scale fraud (Article 159 of the Criminal Code of the Russian Federation) and money laundering. According to investigators, the company "Energia" had allegedly misappropriated approximately 478–500 million rubles from PJSC "MRSK Yuga". He spent about nine months in pre-trial detention and a similar period under house arrest. On 3 May 2017 the Voroshilovsky District Court of Rostov-on-Don fully acquitted him and co-defendant Sergey Konopsky, finding no corpus delicti. During the proceedings Khurudzhi stated that control of the company had been lost and that assets had been stripped.

== Public and political activity ==
Since 2007 Khurudzhi has been a member of the council of the Rostov regional branch of Opora Rossii and chairman of its committee on infrastructure and technological connection. From May 2011 he has served as chairman of the board of the Non-Commercial Partnership of Territorial Grid Organizations. In 2013–2015 he headed the representative office of the Agency for Strategic Initiatives in the Southern Federal District – Rostov Region. After his acquittal he became a public commissioner under the Presidential Commissioner for the Protection of Entrepreneurs’ Rights (Boris Titov) for the protection of entrepreneurs held in custody. He was associated with the Party of Growth (including as federal secretary and regional leader). Since 2021 he has been a member of the New People party and head of its human rights committee. He advocates the protection of entrepreneurs against unjustified criminal prosecution.

== Personal life ==
Khurudzhi is married and has a daughter (born 2009). He has lived in Moscow in recent years. His hobbies have included amateur piloting (license obtained in 2012), paragliding, skiing, and aquabiking.
