= Candidates in the 2018 Russian presidential election =

2018 Russian presidential candidates
- 18 March 2018
- Opinion polls

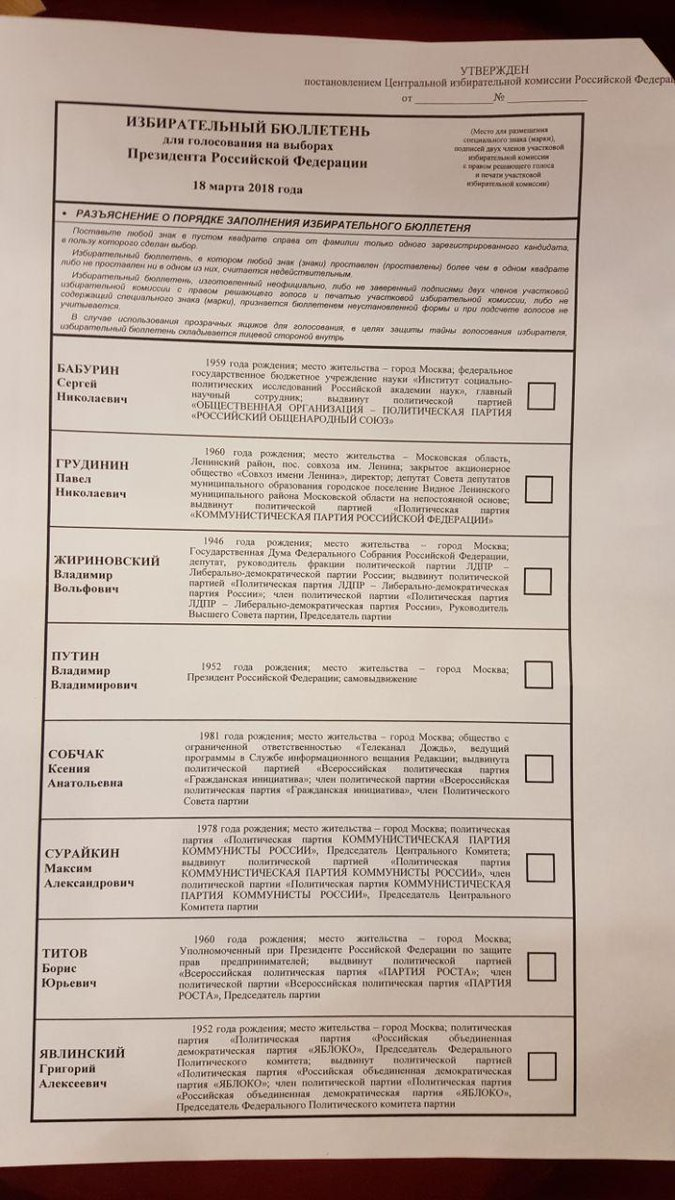
An election ballot listing the presidential candidates

This article contains the list of candidates associated with the 2018 Russian presidential election.

70 people – 46 independents and 24 party-nominated – informed the Central Election Commission (CEC) that they intended to participate in the election as candidates. 1 January 2018 was the last day that independents could notify the CEC of their intent to participate. Independents had until the end of 7 January 2018 to file registration documents with the CEC, whilst for those nominated by parties the deadline was the end of 12 January. 36 people were nominated to participate in the election – 15 independents and 21 party-nominated candidates. Out of them, eight were registered, 11 withdrew, and 17 were rejected.

== Candidates ==
These candidates have been officially registered by the CEC. Candidates are listed in the order they appeal on the ballot paper (alphabetical order in Russian).

Candidate name, age, political party	Political offices	Campaign	Details	Registration date
Sergey Baburin (59); Russian All-People's Union	People's Deputy of Russia (1990–1993); Deputy of the State Duma (1994–2000, 2003–2007); Leader of the Russian All-People's Union (2011–2025)	(Campaign • Website)	On 22 December 2017, the Russian All-People's Union nominated Sergey Baburin as its presidential candidate. On 24 December Baburin filed registration documents with the CEC. The CEC rejected Baburin's bid on 25 December because it identified violations in the information provided regarding 18 of his party's 48 representatives. Baburin resubmitted the documents and they were approved by the CEC.	7 February 2018
Pavel Grudinin (57); Communist Party	Deputy of the Moscow Oblast Duma (1997–2011)	(Campaign • Website)	Despite the fact that Communist Party leader and perennial candidate Gennady Zyuganov said his nomination was supported by all leftist forces and he would participate in the elections on behalf of the party, the Zhigulyovsk branch of the party voted to supported the candidacy of Pavel Grudinin, who also won the primaries of Left Front, a coalition of left-wing parties with no representation in the State Duma. Grudinin did not deny his nomination from the Communist Party. On 21 December 2017 it was reported that Zyuganov proposed to nominate Grudinin. Initially the Communist Party and the National Patriotic Forces of Russia (NPFR) planned to nominate a single candidate: Grudinin (supported by the Communists) or Yury Boldyrev (supported by the NPFR). Boldyrev also participated in the primaries of Left Front in which he lost in the second round to Grudinin. According to the Deputy Alexander Yushchenko, Zyuganov was still among the candidates for the nomination. He named the other candidates as Yury Afonin, Sergey Levchenko and Leonid Kalashnikov. On 22 December Zyuganov, Levchenko and Kalashnikov withdrew their bids, and Zyuganov rejected the candidacies of Afonin and Boldyrev, leaving Grudinin as the sole candidate. Grudinin was officially nominated at the party congress on 23 December. Zyuganov is the head of Grudinin's presidential campaign. Grudinin filed registration documents with the CEC on 28 December and 9 January 2018.	12 January 2018
Vladimir Zhirinovsky (71); Liberal Democratic Party	Deputy of the State Duma (1994–2022); Leader of the Liberal Democratic Party (1991–2022)	(Campaign)	In June 2015 Vladimir Zhirinovsky said he plans to participate in presidential elections, but in July of the same year, the politician said that the Liberal Democratic Party, perhaps "will pick a more efficient person." Already in March 2016, he announced the names of those were likely to be nominated as a candidate from the Liberal Democratic Party. This included Deputy Chairman of the State Duma Igor Lebedev or deputies Mikhail Degtyarev, Yaroslav Nilov and Alexei Didenko. On 28 October 2016, the LDPR's official website released a statement announcing that the party will nominate Zhirinovsky as their presidential candidate. This is the fifth time that he is running for president since the breakup of the Soviet Union (and sixth overall). Zhirinovsky was officially nominated by his party at its 31st congress on 20 December 2017. He submitted to the CEC some of the documents required for registration the next day, and the rest of them on 27 December. At 71, Zhirinovsky is the oldest person to run for president in Russia.	29 December 2017
Vladimir Putin (65); Independent	President of Russia (2000–2008 and 2012–present); Prime Minister of Russia (1999–2000 and 2008–2012); Leader of United Russia (2008–2012); Director of the Federal Security Service (1998–1999)	(Campaign • Website)	On 6 December 2017 Vladimir Putin announced that he will run for a second consecutive term. Putin announced that he would run as an independent at his annual press conference on 14 December. Putin's action group officially put forward his nomination in Moscow on 26 December. Putin filed registration documents with the CEC the next day. The CEC approved his documents on 28 December. On 29 January Putin handed over the signatures to the CEC. By 2 February they had been verified – only 232 signatures were deemed invalid.	6 February 2018
Ksenia Sobchak (36); Civic Initiative	None	(Campaign • Website)	TV anchor, opposition activist and journalist Ksenia Sobchak announced that she would run for president in October 2017. Sobchak is the first female candidate in 14 years and the youngest candidate to run since 2004. Sobchak was nominated by Civic Initiative at the party's congress on 23 December and became a member of the party. Sobchak filed registration documents with the CEC on 25 December. Her documents were approved by the CEC on 26 December.	8 February 2018
Maxim Suraykin (39); Communists of Russia	Chairman of the Central Committee of the Communists of Russia (2012–2022)	(Campaign)	The Central Committee of the Communists of Russia party announced the nomination of its chairman Maxim Suraykin as its candidate for the election in February 2017. Suraykin stated that he aims to at least come in second place, and defeat Zyuganov's larger Communist Party of the Russian Federation. CR nominated Suraykin at the party congress in Moscow on 24 December. He filed registration documents with the CEC on the same day. Suraykin's documents were approved by the CEC on 25 December.	8 February 2018
Boris Titov (57); Party of Growth	Leader of the Party of Growth (2016–2024); Presidential Commissioner for Entrepreneurs' Rights	(Campaign • Website)	The leader of the Party of Growth, Presidential Commissioner for Entrepreneurs' Rights Boris Titov declared that he would participation in presidential election on 26 November 2017. Initially the party conducted primaries in which Titov did not participate, however, according to the party leadership, none of the candidates received sufficient support. Titov was officially nominated by his party on 21 December. He submitted to the CEC the documents required for registration the next day. Titov's documents were approved by the CEC on 25 December.	7 February 2018
Grigory Yavlinsky (65); Yabloko	Chairman of Yabloko (1995–2008); Deputy of the State Duma (1994–2003); Deputy of the Legislative Assembly of St. Petersburg (2011–2016)	(Campaign • Website)	Suggestions that Yavlinsky would run for president in 2018 were first made in 2013, and he was announced as the candidate from the Yabloko party at a convention in February 2016, having been previously the party's candidate for the presidency in 1996 and 2000. In the weeks following the announcement he began campaigning for the election early by travelling to multiple cities across the country. Yabloko nominated Yavlinsky at its party congress on 22 December. He submitted to the CEC the documents required for registration the next day. Yavlinsky's documents were approved by the CEC on 25 December.	7 February 2018

== Rejected candidates ==
Candidate	Political party	Political offices	Details
Viktor Cherepnin	Independent	None	Viktor Cherepnin, an unemployed man from Chelyabinsk, filed registration documents with the CEC on 7 January 2018. The CEC rejected his bid to become a candidate on 10 January 2018 because the action group that nominated him only consisted of 34 people instead of the required 500.
Alexander Chukhlebov	Independent	None	Leader of the public movement Vozrozhdeniye ("Re-birth") Alexander Chukhlebov said that he would run for president on 15 November 2017. He was nominated by a group of activists from his movement on 24 December. Chukhlebov filed registration documents with the CEC on 26 December. The CEC partially approved the documents and informed Chukhlebov that he could address violations in the documents and resubmit them. On 2 January 2018, the CEC reported that Chukhlebov possesses a Finnish residence permit, which excludes him from being registered as a candidate (Russian election law does not allow candidates to possess foreign citizenship or residence permits). In his defence, Chukhlebov stated that he no longer possesses a residence permit and has documentary proof. The CEC filed a case with the Supreme Court in order to confirm the possession of a residence permit, reverse its initial decision and reject Chukhlebov's candidacy. The Supreme Court ruled in favour of the CEC on 5 January.
Ayna Gamzatova	Independent	None	Journalist and wife of the Supreme Mufti of Dagestan Ayna Gamzatova was nominated for president by an initiative group on 30 December 2017. She filed registration documents with the CEC on 1 January 2018. The CEC approved Gamzatova's documents and then later rejected them after uncovering a number of violations.
Marina Kopyonkina	Native Party	None	Head of the Youth and Longetivity Center Marina Kopyonkina filed registration documents with the CEC on 11 January 2018. Kopyonkina's candidacy was rejected by the CEC on 16 January.
Vladimir Kuznetsov	Independent	None	On 20 December 2017 Vladimir Kuznetsov filed a notice of a meeting of group of voters. The CEC rejected his bid to become a candidate on 10 January 2018 because the action group that nominated him only consisted of 24 people instead of the required 500.
Lucky Lee	Independent	None	Strip club owner Lucky Lee's presidential bid came to an end after the CEC rejected his documents and found a number of violations at the meeting of the action group that nominated him.
Oleg Lurie	Independent	None	On 20 December 2017 the CEC announced that journalist Oleg Lurie had notified the Commission that he intends to participate in the election as a candidate. Lurie was nominated by an initiative group on 24 December. He filed registration documents with the CEC on the same day. Lurie's bid was rejected by the CEC on 25 December because of a past criminal conviction. In addition he only submitted one of the necessary documents.
Alexei Navalny (campaign)	Independent	None	Navalny announced his candidacy and the start of his campaign on 13 December 2016. His eligibility was put into question by his five-year suspended sentence for accused embezzlement of timber from the company Kirovles. The Russian Supreme Court overturned his sentence in November 2016 after the European Court of Human Rights determined that Navalny's rights were violated and sent it back to a district court in the city of Kirov for review. However, in February 2017, a district court in Kirov upheld his suspended sentence for embezzlement which could prevent him from running. According to his chief of staff, he decided to begin his campaign early to raise support for his candidacy so that the government could not deny him access to the ballot and that Navalny will continue to campaign regardless of the ruling. Throughout the early months of 2017 he traveled to many cities, where he set up campaign offices. Representatives of the CEC commented on several occasions that Navalny will not be able to run due to his conviction in the Kirovles case. On 24 December 2017, groups of voters met in twenty Russian cities to put Navalny forward as a candidate. He filed registration documents with the CEC on the same day. Navalny's bid was rejected by the CEC on 25 December because of a past criminal conviction. Soon after the news broke, Navalny called on his supporters to boycott the elections.
Sergei Polonsky (campaign)	Independent	None	The businessman's lawyer announced Polonsky's intention to run for president on 15 December 2016, during his trial for a fraud case. Polonsky personally announced his intention to run on 8 November 2017. On the same day the CEC commented that Polonsky cannot register as a candidate due to his fraud conviction. Polonsky was nominated by an initiative group made up of 520 activists on 24 December. He filed registration documents with the CEC on the same day. Polonsky's documents were rejected because the initiative group didn't have enough members. In addition, his past criminal conviction prevented him from becoming a candidate. At the same time, Polonsky announced the creation of a political party "For All" with which he intends to participate in 2021 legislative election, and well run for president in 2024.
Tristan Prisyagin	Independent	None	Public figure Tristan Prisyagin filed registration documents with the CEC on 7 January 2018, commenting that he "needs [to be in] the Kremlin in order to restore the Soviet Union". Prisyagin is known for calling himself the "President of the USSR" on the internet. The CEC rejected his bid to become a candidate on 10 January 2018 because the action group that nominated him only consisted of 137 people instead of the required 500.
Vasily Pugachyov	Independent	None	On 20 December 2017 Vasily Pugachyov filed a notice of a meeting of group of voters. Pugachyov filed registration documents with the CEC on 7 January 2018. The CEC rejected his bid to become a candidate on 10 January due to a number of violations.
Yelena Semerikova	Women's Dialogue	Advisor to the Chairman of the Federation Council; Leader of the party Women's Dialogue	Leader of the party Women's Dialogue Semerikova announced her candidacy on 31 October 2017. She was nominated by the party on 20 December. She filed registration documents with the CEC on 24 December. On 25 December the CEC rejected Semerikova's nomination for president that was made at the party congress due to a lack of quorum. Delegates from at least half federal subjects (43 of 85) are required for a valid nomination, while the congress was attended by only 24.
Yury Sidorov	Party of Small Business	Leader of the Party of Small Business	The Party of Small Business of Russia nominated its chairman, businessman Yury Sidorov at the party's congress on 23 December 2017. Sidorov filed registration documents with the CEC on 3 January 2018. The CEC rejected Sidorov's bid on 5 January after it established that he had failed to comply with electoral law.
Sergey Stolpak	Independent	None	Pensioner and former FSB employee Sergey Stolpak filed registration documents with the CEC on 7 January 2018. The CEC rejected his bid to become a candidate on 10 January 2018 because he failed to provide one the mandatory documents.
Tatiana Volovik	Independent	None	On 20 December 2017 the CEC announced that leader of the defrauded shared housing equity movement Tatiana Volovik had notified the Commission that she intends to participate in the election as a candidate. She filed registration documents with the CEC on 2 January 2018. The CEC rejected Volovik's documents on 5 January 2018 due to a number of violations.
Andrey Yatsun	Independent	None	Businessman Andrey Yatsun filed registration documents with the CEC on 4 January 2018. His documents were rejected the following day due to a number of violations of electoral law.

== Declared candidates who withdrew ==
Candidate	Political party	Political offices	Details
Elvira Agurbash	Green Alliance	None	Elvira Agurbash, a businesswoman from Moscow Oblast, announced her intention to participate in the election on 5 September 2017. She was officially nominated as the presidential candidate from the party Green Alliance at its congress on 21 December. Agurbash filed registration documents with the CEC on 28 December. The CEC commented that mistakes had been made in the documents and that they need to be resubmitted if Agurbash wants to proceed to the next stage of the registration procedure (opening a campaign bank account and collecting signatures). Her documents were fully approved by the CEC on 2 January 2018. On 31 January it became known that Agurbash will not hand over the signatures to the CEC.
Anton Bakov (campaign)	Monarchist Party	Deputy of the State Duma (2003–2007); Chairman of the Monarchist Party (2012–present)	On 29 September 2017, Businessman Anton Bakov announced that he will run for president. Bakov participated in the primaries of the Third Force bloc, which failed to determine a clear winner. At a post-primaries press conference, the participants of the primaries (except Olga Anishchenko) claimed that they would be participating in the election as candidates. Bakov was nominated at the Monarchist Party's congress on 23 December. Bakov filed registration documents with the CEC on 26 December. The CEC partially approved the documents and informed Bakov that he could address violations in the documents and resubmit them. The CEC approved Bakov's documents on 5 January 2018. He gathered the necessary 100,000 signatures in support of his candidacy, but withdrew on 24 January due to called by him reason of having dual citizenship, that prohibits to nominate: Bakov is a citizen of the micronation Romanov Empire, that was built by him. This micronation, as told by Bakov, is recognized by Republic of The Gambia. According to that, Bakov considers himself as a citizen of two diplomatic recognized states.
Anatoly Batashov	Independent	Adviser to the mayor of Balashikha	Public relations specialist and campaign adviser Anatoly Batashov announced his candidacy on 15 December 2016, and the beginning of his campaign. A couple of days later he stepped down from his position as adviser to the mayor of Balashikha, a city in Moscow Oblast, to spend time travelling to different regions of Russia on his campaign. He took part in various political campaigns before. Batashov said he would run for the Greens, however, the party leadership said it would nominate Rufina Shagapova (but ended up supporting incumbent Vladimir Putin). He failed to submit registration documents to the CEC.
Andrey Bazhutin	Independent	None	The campaign of the leader of the long-distance lorry driver protest movement, chairman of Association of Russian Freight Carriers collapsed after the action group that was supposed to nominate him in Dagestan failed to materialise – 50 supporters attended instead of the necessary 500.
Andrei Bogdanov (campaign)	Democratic Party	Chairman of the Communist Party of Social Justice; Former Chairman of the Democratic Party	On 10 September 2017, Andrei Bogdanov announced that he will run for president. He participated in the 2008 presidential election in which he gained 1.29% of the vote. Bogdanov participated in the primaries of the Third Force bloc, which failed to determine a clear winner. At a post-primaries press conference, the participants of the primaries (except Olga Anishchenko) claimed that they would be participating in the election as candidates. Despite the fact that he is the leader of the Communist party of Social Justice, Bogdanov was supposed to be nominated by the Democratic Party, which he headed earlier. He failed to submit registration documents to the CEC.
Sergey Bizyukin	Independent	None	Journalist and historian Bizyukin, announced his candidacy on 14 December 2016. He failed to submit registration documents to the CEC.
Oleg Bulayev	Communist Party of Social Justice	Deputy of the Volgograd City Duma	Deputy of the Volgograd City Duma Oleg Bulayev filed registration documents with the CEC on 12 January 2018 after being nominated by the Communist Party of Social Justice. Bulayev attempted to become governor of Volgograd Oblast in 2014, but came last with 2.28% of the vote. He withdrew his candidacy on 16 January. According to him, he did it to avoid splitting the Communist electorate.
Ustin Chachikhin	Independent	None	The writer Ustin Chachikhin announced his intent to run for president on his social media page in March 2017. He failed to submit registration documents to the CEC.
Alexander Donskoy (campaign)	Independent	Former Mayor of Arkhangelsk	Former Mayor of Arkhangelsk, openly gay Alexander Donskoy said he will run for president on 24 October 2017. He failed to submit registration documents to the CEC.
Tahir Islamov	Independent	None	On 20 December 2017 Vice President of the All-Russian Organisation of the Hard of Seeing Tahir Islamov filed a notice of a meeting of group of voters. On 28 December he followed the advice of his organisation and withdrew his bid in favour of incumbent Vladimir Putin.
Irina Gagite	Russian Socialist Party	Leader of the Russian Socialist Party	Irina Gagite, member of the Russian Socialist Party, filed registration documents with the CEC on 11 January 2018. Gagite withdrew her candidacy at a meeting of the CEC, during which she was informed about multiple violations in the submitted documents and advised to withdraw.
Andrei Getmanov	Russian International Party	None	Andrei Getmanov participated in the primaries of the Third Force bloc, which failed to determine a clear winner. At a post-primaries press conference, the participants of the primaries (except Olga Anishchenko) claimed that they would be participating in the election as candidates. Getmanov failed to submit registration documents to the CEC.
Yekaterina Gordon	Party of Good Deeds	None	Journalist, singer-songwriter and activist Yekaterina Gordon announced her candidacy on 30 October 2017. High-profile figures in the world of Russian politics were quick to dismiss and cast doubt on her candidacy. Gordon has commented that she has a “positive [election] programme”. It was initially assumed that she would run as an independent, however she was later nominated by the Party of Good Deeds on 23 December. Gordon filed registration documents with the CEC on 27 December. Her documents were approved by the CEC on 29 December. After collecting 105,000 signatures to support her candidacy, Gordon announced at a press conference that she was withdrawing because "she didn't want to take part in this farce, this show".
Roman Khudyakov	Chestno	Deputy of the State Duma (2012–2016); Deputy of the Tambov Oblast Duma (2016–present)	On 21 December 2017 Chestno nominated Roman Khudyakov as the party's presidential candidate at its congress. He submitted to the CEC the documents required for registration the next day. The CEC approved his documents on 28 December. Khudyakov withdrew on 22 January 2018 in order to support Vladimir Putin's presidential bid.
Yelena Klimashkina	Independent	None	Single mother and public sector worker from the Altai Krai Yelena Klimashkina announced that she would run for president in May 2017. She failed to submit registration documents to the CEC.
Mikhail Kozlov	Party of Social Security	None	Social psychology expert Mikhail Kozlov was nominated as the candidate of the Party of Social Security at its congress on 23 December 2017. Kozlov filed registration documents with the CEC in late December. On 2 January 2018 the CEC rejected his documents due to a missing stamp. Kozlov resubmitted documents, which were approved by the CEC on 5 January. On 19 January the CEC cancelled the registration of Kozlov's financial representative because a forged document was provided. As a result, Kozlov continues to be a candidate, but has to re-open his campaign account and begin collecting signatures from scratch. On 31 January handed over to the CEC blank leaves for signatures, stating that they have not calculated their potential.
Alex Lesley	Independent	None	Writer and public figure Alex Lesley announced his candidacy on 12 June 2017 (a public holiday in Russia). He failed to submit registration documents to the CEC.
Natalya Lisitsyna	Russian United Labour Front	None	Crane operator Lisitsyna was nominated by the Russian United Labour Front at its party congress on 21 December 2017 in St. Petersburg. The party then filed registration documents with the CEC. On 25 December the CEC rejected Lisitsyna's bid because she failed to provide an income statement and the party didn't to inform the CEC about its congress in good time. Lisitsyna resubmitted documents on 27 December. The CEC again refused to approve them due to mistakes that had been made. They were files a third time, and on 5 January 2018 the CEC approved the documents. On 31 January, representatives of the party brought to the CEC only 90,000 signatures, the remaining 10,000 did not have time to deliver it to Moscow until 6 PM.
Vyacheslav Maltsev	Independent	Former Deputy of the Saratov Oblast Duma	Politician Vyacheslav Maltsev announced his candidacy in February 2017 as an independent, although an analyst noted in an article in Nezavisimaya Gazeta that his announcement to run for president was mostly symbolic. In early July 2017 Maltsev left Russia because a criminal case was opened against him. In October 2017 a court issued an arrest warrant for Maltsev and banned his revolutionary Artpodgotovka movement. He failed to submit registration documents to the CEC.
Vladimir Mikhailov	Independent	Deputy of the Kostroma Oblast Duma (2005–present)	Inventor, entrepreneur, Deputy of the Kostroma Oblast Duma Vladimir Mikhailov said that he will run for the President on 26 July 2017. Mikhailov filed registration documents with the CEC on 28 December. They were approved by the CEC on 2 January 2018. Withdrew his candidacy on January 31 after failing to collect the required number of signatures.
Olga Onishchenko	People's Alliance	None	Olga Onishchenko participated in the primaries of the Third Force bloc, which failed to determine a clear winner. At a post-primaries press conference, the participants of the primaries (except Anishchenko) claimed that they would be participating in the election as candidates.
Sergey Pakhomov	Independent	None	Psychic, musician, artist and actor Sergey Pakhomov announced that he would run for president in June 2017. In a subsequent interview he said that his bid is “entirely serious”. He failed to submit registration documents to the CEC.
Stanislav Polishchuk	Party of Social Reform	Chairman of the Party of Social Reform	Chairman of the Party of Social Reform Stanislav Polishchuk submitted registration documents to the CEC on 26 December 2017. His documents were approved on 2 January 2018. Withdrew his candidacy on January 31 in support of Vladimir Putin.
Anatoly Rabinovich	Independent	None	On 20 December 2017 Anatoly Rabinovich filed a notice of a meeting of group of voters. He failed to submit registration documents to the CEC.
Sirazhdin Ramazanov	Social Democratic Party	Leader of the Social Democratic Party	In November leader of the Social Democratic Party Sirazhdin Ramazanov took part in the Third Force primaries, which failed to determine a candidate among a number of non-parliamentary parties. He filed registration documents with the CEC on 26 December 2017. On 29 December the CEC rejected the documents and the party made the decision to not participate in the election.
Larisa Renar	Independent	None	On 5 December 2017 entrepreneur and public figure Larisa Renar said she will run for president. She failed to submit registration documents to the CEC.
Ildar Rezyapov	Party of Russian Veterans	None	Ildar Rezyapov participated in the primaries of the Third Force bloc, which failed to determine a clear winner. At a post-primaries press conference, the participants of the primaries (except Olga Anishchenko) claimed that they would be participating in the election as candidates. Rezyapov failed to submit registration documents to the CEC.
Alexandra Selyaninova	Independent	None	Alexandra Selyaninova (before transition Alexander Selyaninov) is a transsexual pensioner and former policeman from Perm, who claims to be an illegitimate daughter of Boris Yeltsin. She announced her intention to participate in the election on 22 September 2017. She failed to submit registration documents to the CEC.
Samson Sholademi	Independent	None	Blogger and businessman of Nigerian origin, Samson Sholademi, announced that he will run for the presidency on 2 November 2017. In the case of registration will be the first Afro-Russian presidential candidate in the history of Russia. Sholademi initially said that he was only running to draw attention to the problems faced by his neighbourhood - Moscow's Ivanovskoe district. He failed to submit registration documents to the CEC.
Oleg Sidorov	Independent	None	On 20 December 2017 Oleg Sidorov filed a notice of a meeting of group of voters. He failed to submit registration documents to the CEC.
Valentin Smirnov	Independent	None	Factory manager from Stavropol Valentin Smirnov announced that he will run for president on 11 April 2017. He failed to submit registration documents to the CEC.
Vyacheslav Smirnov	Civic Union	None	Vyacheslav Smirnov participated in the primaries of the Third Force bloc, which failed to determine a clear winner. At a post-primaries press conference, the participants of the primaries (except Olga Anishchenko) claimed that they would be participating in the election as candidates. Smirnov failed to submit registration documents to the CEC.
Alexander Sukhov	Independent	None	President of the Russian Charity Fund Alexander Sukhov announced that he will run for president in February 2017. He failed to submit registration documents to the CEC.
Stepan Sulakshin	Independent	Former Deputy of the State Duma	Ex-Deputy of the State Duma (1993–1999), chairman of the unregistered Party of New Type and Director of the Center for Scientific Political Thought and Ideology Stepan Sulakshin was nominated for the presidency on 17 June 2017. On 19 December 2017 he told Nezavisimaya Gazeta that his campaign had come to an end because his team had encountered "insurmountable difficulties", and blamed the authorities.
Alina Vitukhnovskaya	Independent	None	Writer and the head of the unregistered Republican Alternative civil movement, Vitukhnovskaya announced her candidacy in July 2016. She issued a statement on 25 December 2017 in her official support group on the Vkontakte social network, in which she refused to participate in elections, citing the fact that the elections had been filled with so-called "protest leaders" – Alexei Navalny and Ksenia Sobchak – who were either politically short-sighted or had been appointed by the authorities.
Irina Volynets	People's Party	None	Chairwoman of the Central Council of the National Parent Committee Irina Volynets announced her intention to participate in the election on 25 September 2017. Volynets participated in the primaries of the Third Force bloc, which failed to determine a clear winner. At a post-primaries press conference, the participants of the primaries (except Olga Anishchenko) claimed that they would be participating in the election as candidates. The media initially reported that she would be nominated by the People's Party. However, on 30 December she was nominated by the People Against Corruption party. Volynets filed registration documents with the CEC on 5 January 2018; the CEC refused to accept them as several documents were missing. She submitted the complete set on 6 January. Volynets’ bid was rejected by the CEC on 10 January because she failed to inform the CEC about the date if her nomination in good time. Volynets applied to the CEC a third time, on 12 January. On 16 January the CEC approved the documents and allowed her to launch her campaign and begin collecting signatures. Withdrew his candidacy on 31 January and was support Vladimir Putin.
Boris Yakemenko	Independent	None	Yakemenko, one of the founders of the Nashi movement, announced his intention to participate in the elections on 7 September 2017. He was supposed to officially announce his nomination before the election campaign began. However, he withdrew his candidacy on 6 January 2018 after failing to assemble an action group to nominate him. At the same time, Yakemenko said that he was going to run for president in 2024.
Rahman Yansukov	Independent	None	On 1 November 2017, Rahman Yansukov, President of Avanti, an association of entrepreneurs for developing business patriotism, announced his intent to run for president. On 27 December Yansukov withdrew In favour of Vladimir Putin.
Alexey Zolotukhin	Chestno	None	Alexey Zolotukhin participated in the primaries of the Third Force bloc, which failed to determine a clear winner. At a post-primaries press conference, the participants of the primaries (except Olga Anishchenko) claimed that they would be participating in the election as candidates. Roman Khudyakov was nominated as the candidate for Chestno instead. In addition, Zolotukhin failed to submit registration documents to the CEC.

== Possible candidates who did not run ==
The following individuals were included in some polls, were referred to in the media as possible candidates or has publicly expressed interest long before the elections but never announced that they would run.

=== United Russia ===
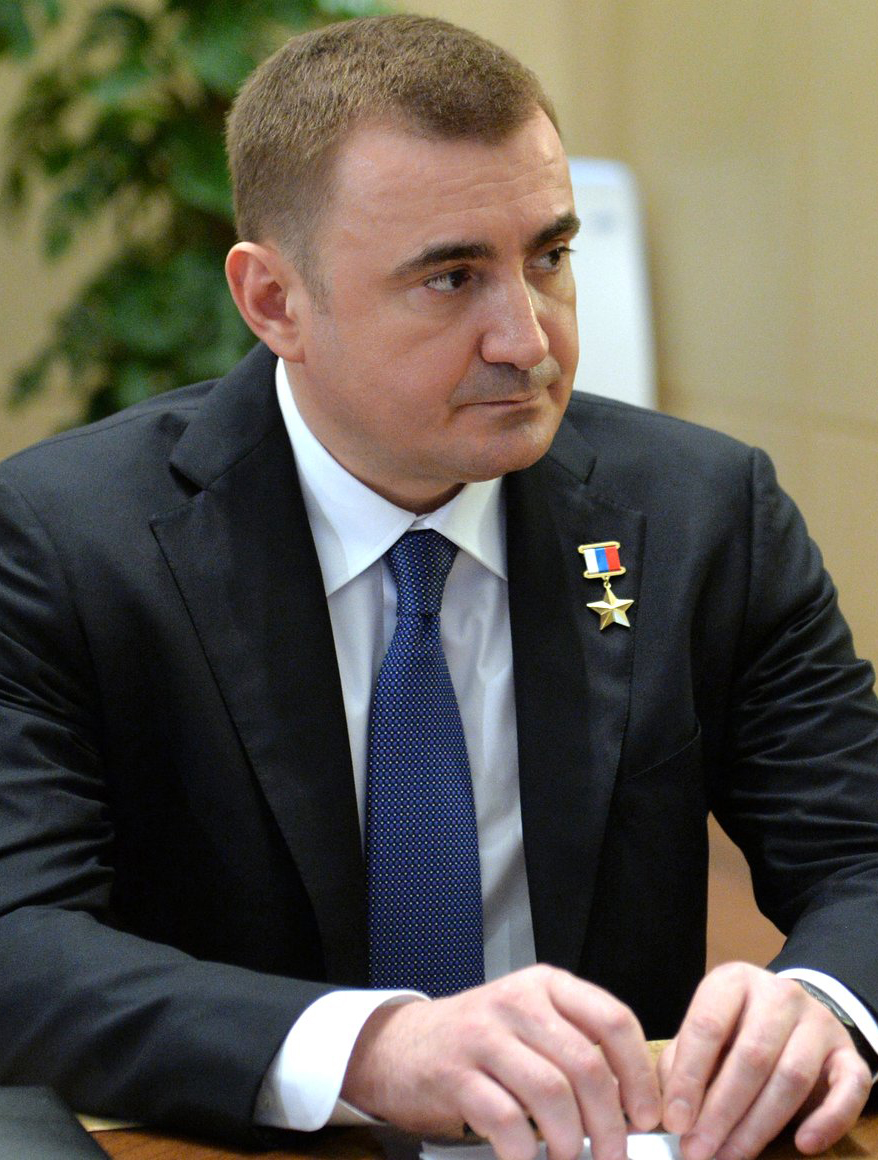
Alexey Dyumin
Governor of Tula Oblast

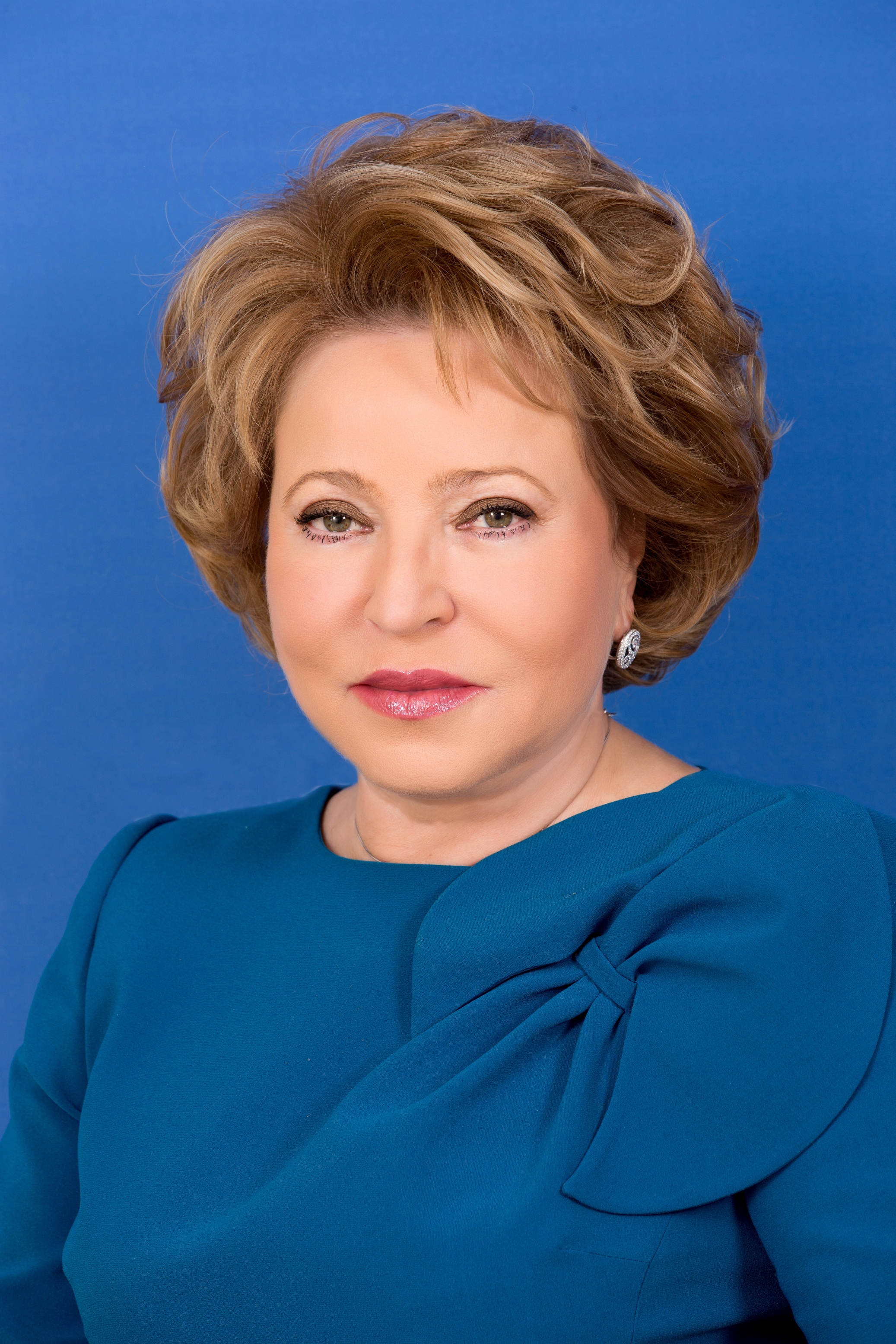
Valentina Matviyenko
Chairwoman of the Federation Council,
Senator from Saint Petersburg

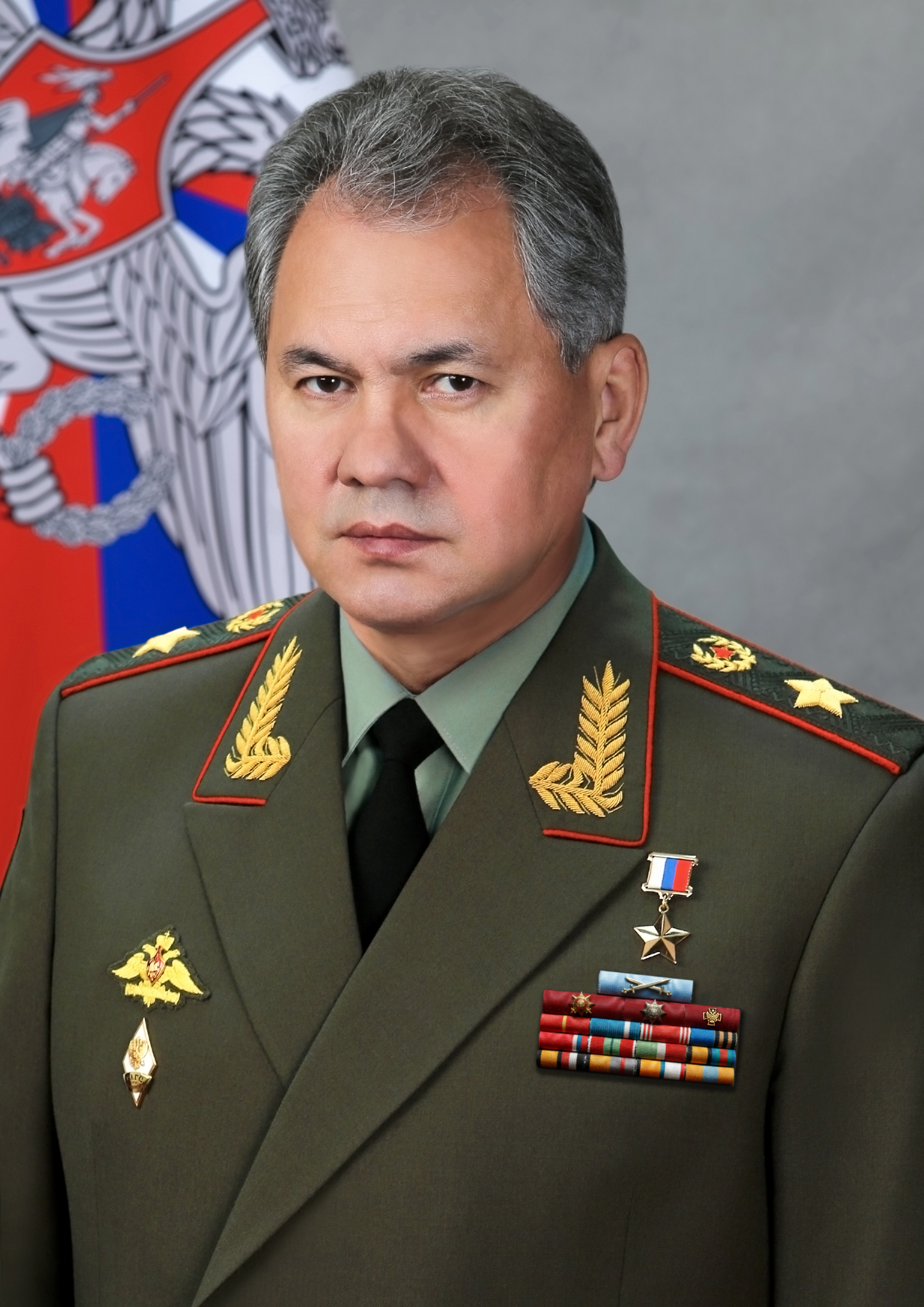
Sergey Shoygu
Minister of Defence

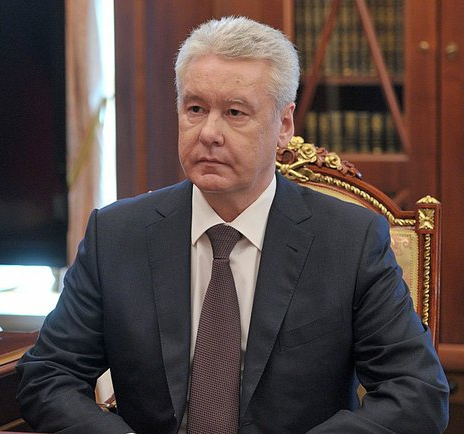
Sergey Sobyanin
Mayor of Moscow

=== Communist party ===
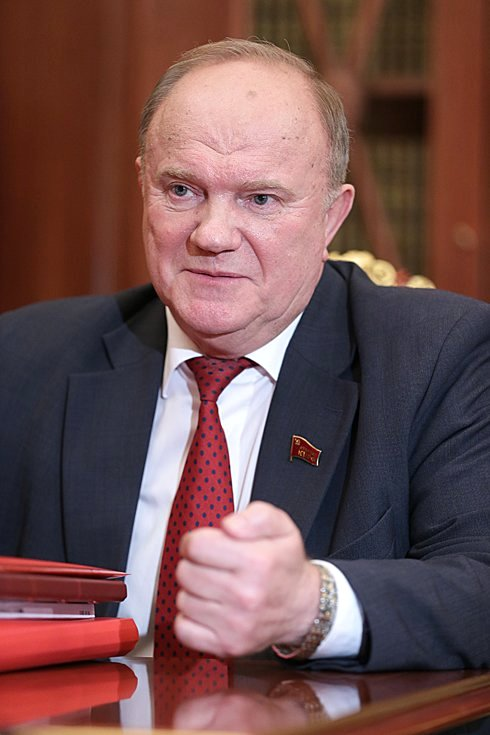
Gennady Zyuganov
Deputy of the State Duma

=== A Just Russia ===
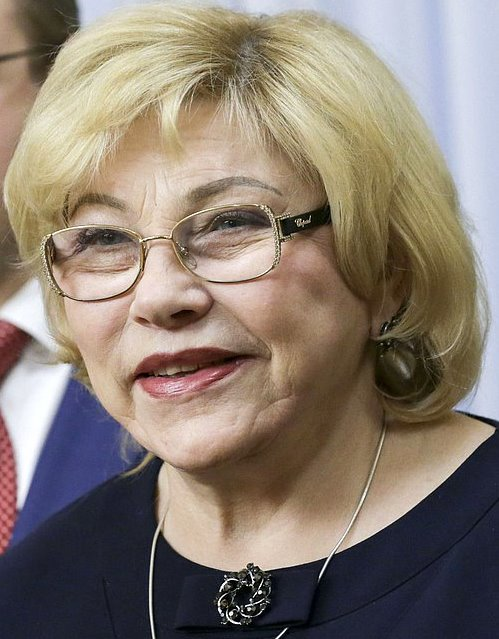
Yelena Drapeko
Deputy of the State Duma

=== Independent candidates ===
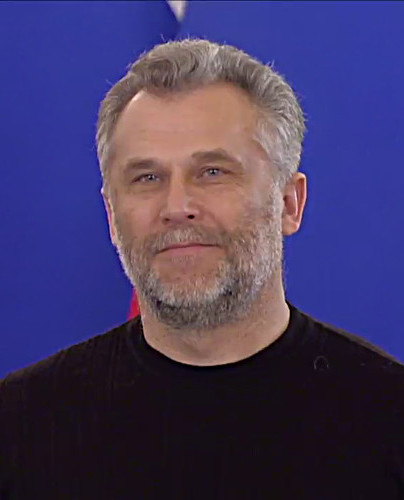
Aleksei Chaly
Former Governor of Sevastopol

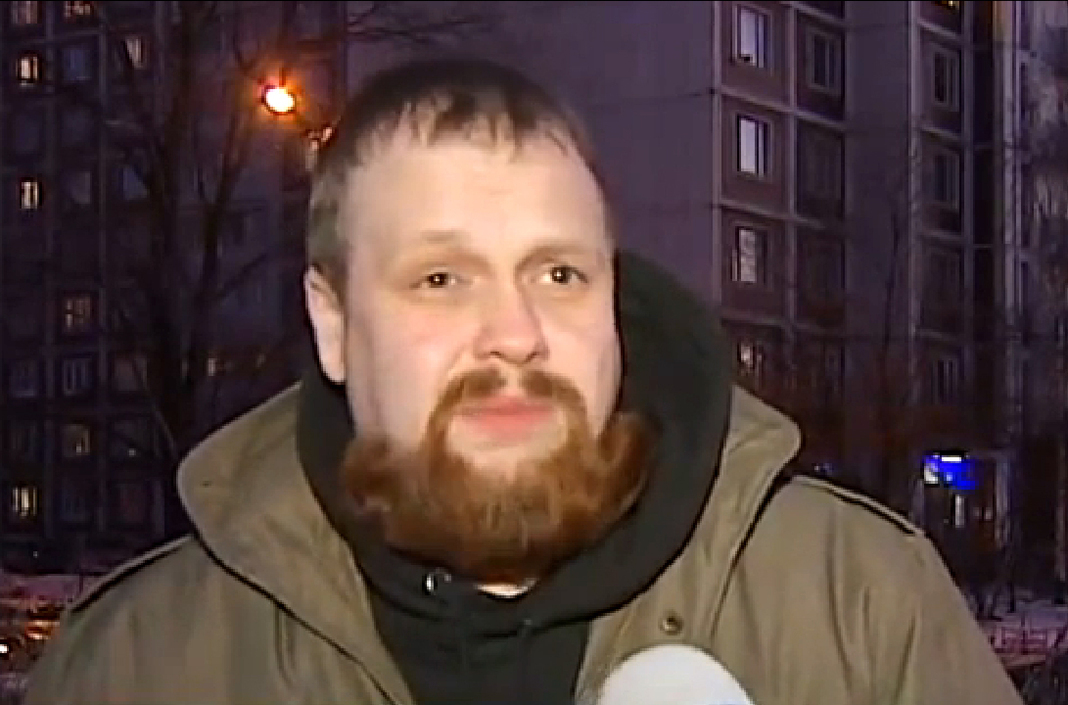
Dmitry Demushkin
Politician

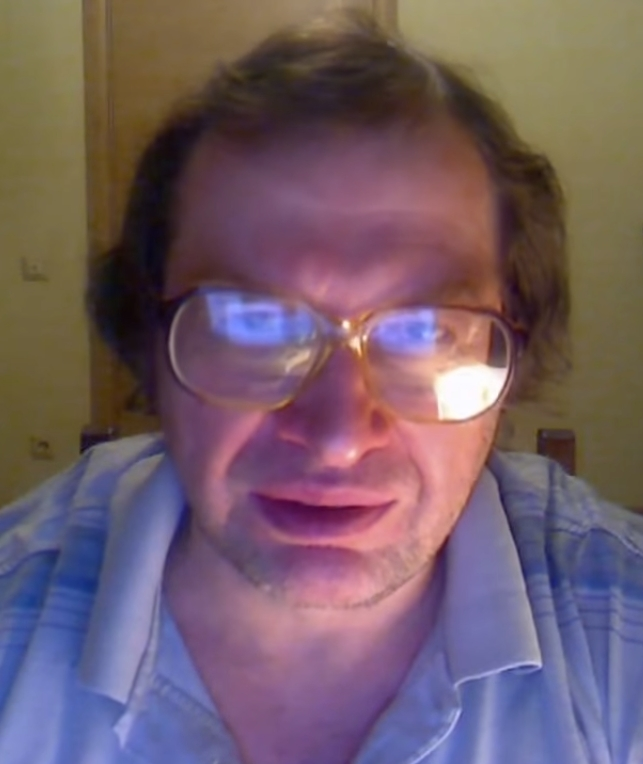
Sergey Mavrodi
former Deputy of the State Duma

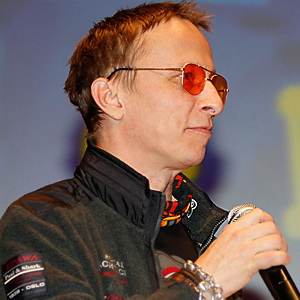
Ivan Okhlobystin
Actor

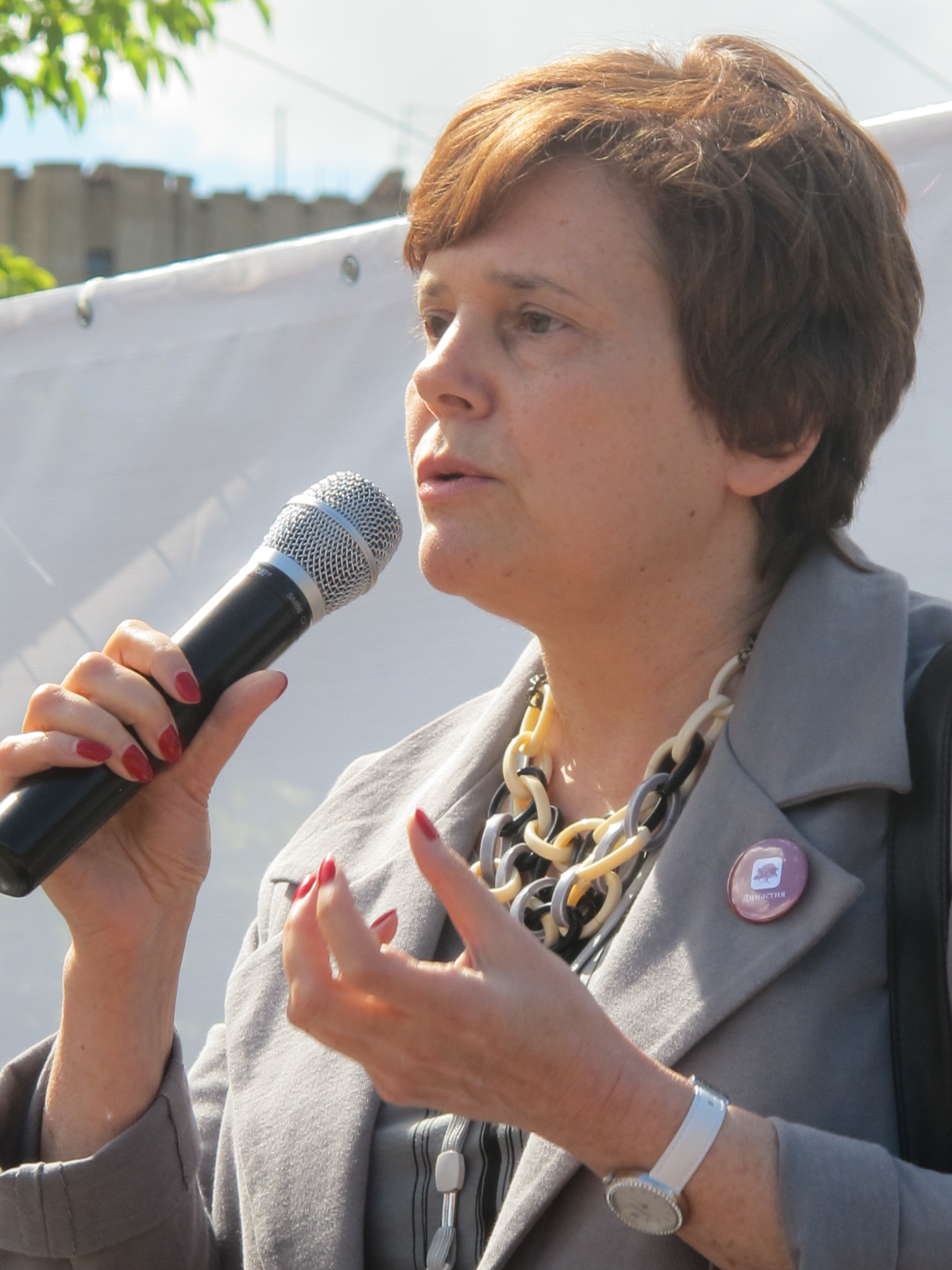
Irina Prokhorova
Journalist

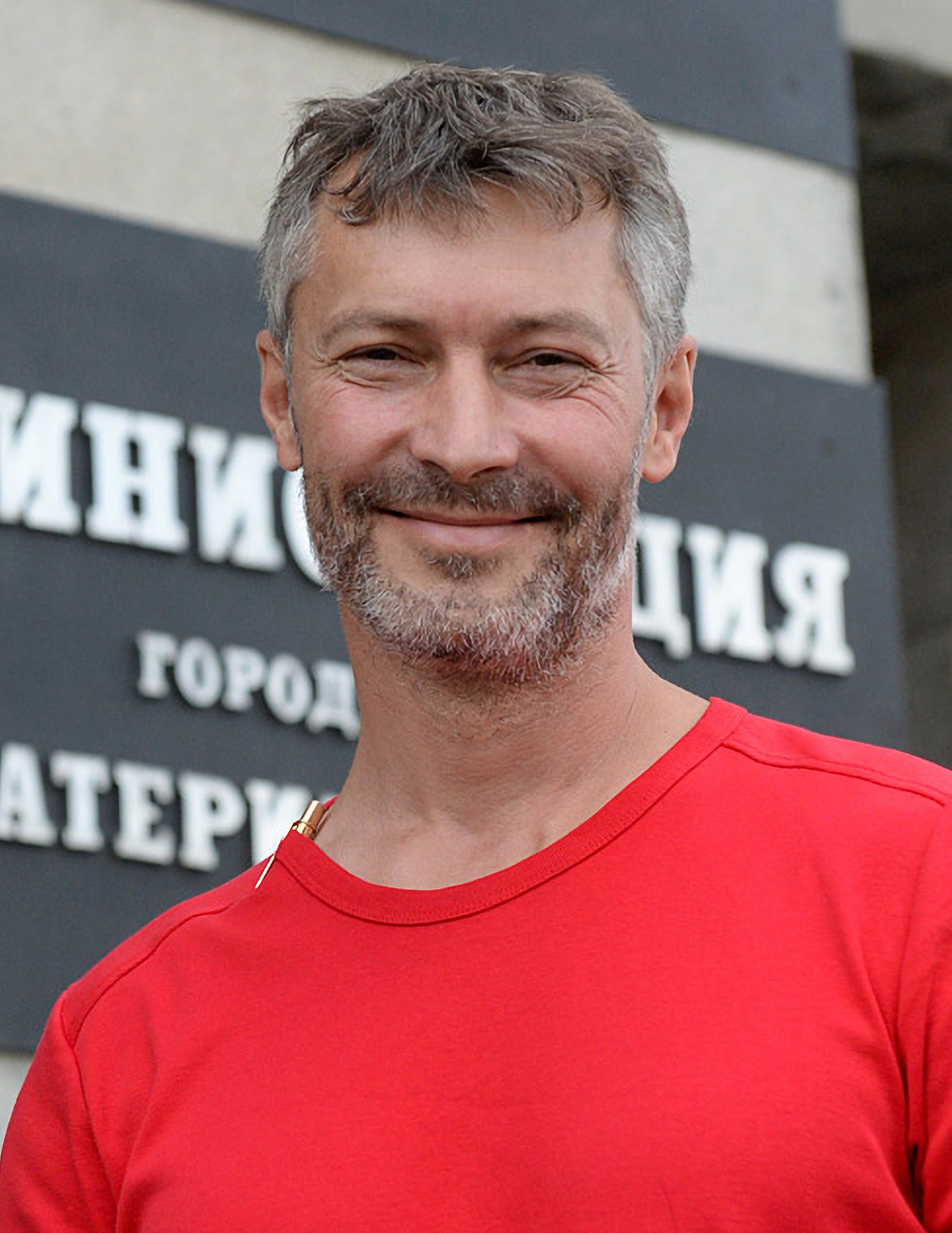
Yevgeny Roizman
Mayor of Yekaterinburg

== See also ==
- List of Russian presidential candidates
