= Volynets =

Volynets may refer to:

- Volynets (surname)
- Volynets (icebreaker), a steam-powered icebreaker
