= Irina Volynets =

Russian journalist and human rights activist

- Ирина Волынец
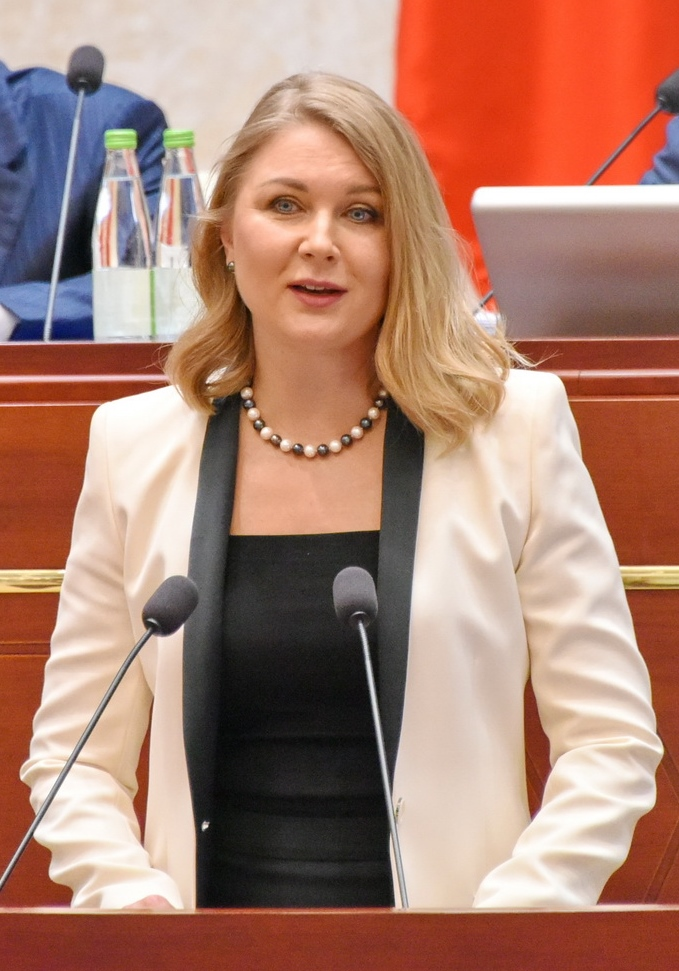
- Born: August 2, 1978 (age 48); Kazan, Tatar ASSR
- Citizenship: Russia
- Education: Kazan Federal University
- Occupations: journalist, pro-government activist
- Known for: Candidate in the 2018 Russian presidential election
- Political party: Independent
- Awards: Honor badge "Labor valor"

Irina Volynets (Russian: Ирина Владимировна Волынец; born August 2, 1978, in the city of Kazan, Tatar ASSR, in the Soviet Union) is a Russian journalist, pro-government campaigner against human rights and for repressive legislation, and leader of the National Parents Committee social movement. In 2017, she became a candidate in the 2018 Russian presidential election, but withdrew her candidacy in favor of Vladimir Putin.

In 2016, Volynets spoke out in support of the proposal to ban abortion in Russia. In the same year, she advocated for the decriminalization of beatings in families. She claimed that mothers are to blame for today's men not being masculine enough and proposed the introduction of "chastity lessons" for girls in schools. Volynets disagrees with the idea that full gender equality has been achieved in Russia and opposes the abolition of the Unified State Exam in Russia. She is also an advocate for the creation of the Ministry of Family and Children's Affairs. In 2024 she promised to campaign against the law protecting victims of domestic violence, arguing that the number of domestic murders in Russia is not excessive ("no more than 1,000 a year") and that in most cases female victims are responsible for "driving the man to it".

In 2020, Volynets was elected as a member of the Civic Chamber of the Russian Federation. She was also appointed Commissioner for the Rights of the Child in the Republic of Tatarstan.

== Education and early career ==
In 1995, Volynets graduated from the mathematics class of Kazan Secondary School No. 126.

In 1998, Volynets participated in the "Empire of Passion" television show, where she stripped to her underpants.

In 2000, she graduated from the College of Journalism, Sociology, and Psychology at Kazan Federal University. She worked as a journalist in regional and federal mass media, authoring various print articles, as well as working on television and radio programs.

Since 2005, she has been the director of the advertising company President, specializing in the production and placement of outdoor advertising.

In 2017, Volynets graduated from the College of State and Municipal Administration at the Russian Presidential Academy of National Economy and Public Administration with a degree in Public Finance Management. In 2018, she graduated from the Kazan State Institute of Culture and Arts.

== Activism and politics ==
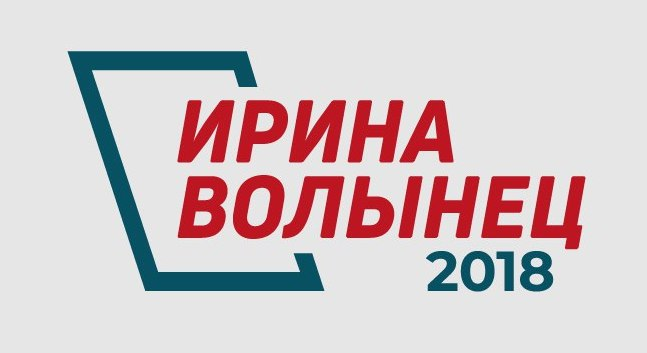
The pre-election poster of the candidate for the President of Russia 2018 Irina Volynets.

Volynets was involved with the project Russian Billion, an initiative of the Union of Russian Citizens, which was chaired by Nikolai Starikov.

She is the chairwoman of the all-Russian public movement Mothers of Russia and the Union of Social Justice of Russia in the Republic of Tatarstan. She is also the head of the development committee of the Association of Small and Medium Enterprises of the Republic of Tatarstan and a member of the public council under the Ministry of Economy of the Republic of Tatarstan.

Since 2016, Volynets has been the chairwoman of the Central Council social movement, the National Parents Committee, and a member of the Commission on Patriotic and Spiritual-Moral Education of the Board of Trustees of DOSAAF.

Between 2014 and 2016, she was the head of the Commission for Family and Demographic Policy of the United Russia party, chaired by Sergei Zheleznyak.

In 2015, Volynets was elected deputy to the Chistopol District of the Republic of Tatarstan. In 2016, she ran for the State Duma of the VII convocation from Fair Russia in the single-mandate constituency 59 in Perm, taking second place.

In 2017, she took part in the contest of candidates for the presidency of Russia, for the Third Force forum, chaired by Andrei Bogdanov. As a result, she was nominated as a candidate for the election of the President of Russia for the People's Party in 2018. She later withdrew her candidacy in support of Vladimir Putin.

In 2020, she was elected as a member of the Civic Chamber of the Russian Federation and was appointed Commissioner for the Rights of the Child of the Republic of Tatarstan.

== Public initiatives ==
Volynets publicly promotes the creation of large families in society. She believes that public control of orphanages will significantly reduce corruption risks, and she aims to create an effective anti-corruption policy to protect the rights and interests of orphans and children left without parental care.

Volynets criticized the draft concept adopted by the Ministry of Education in the "Strategy for the Development of Education in the Russian Federation for the Period until 2025," in which she claims there is an obscure form of propaganda for homosexuality.

In 2016, she participated in the primaries of United Russia in the State Duma of the 7th convocation. At the debate, she spoke about the creation of family support centers, created in the form of private-state partnership within the framework of maternity capital for single mothers. She also spoke about the management of maternal salaries and the creation of the Ministry of Family Affairs. In her election program, Volynets advocated the abolition of the Unified State Exam. In the same year, she launched a judicial confrontation against State Duma deputy Alexei Burnashov, demanding that the Supreme Court of the Russian Federation deprive him of a deputy mandate for hiding information about having foreign property. Natalya Poklonskaya, chairwoman of the State Duma's commission for monitoring the reliability of the information on the income and property of deputies, supported Volynets's call and initiated an audit.

In 2018, during the presidential election campaign, she advocated for the creation of the Ministry of Family and Children Affairs. In the same year, she called for the exemption of families with children from property tax.

In July 2018, she was part of the delegation for the resettlement of the descendants of the Dutch colonists of South Africa (Boers) to the Stavropol Krai territory.

In 2019, Volynets stated that it was not right to punish parents for having young children who smoke. In the same year, she called for the release of infant formulas for free and only with a prescription. She supported the initiative of the Public Chamber to introduce fixed workloads for children in schools to reduce the risk of overload from extracurriculars.

In 2020, together with the All-Russian Trade Union of Education, she acted as co-organizer of a press conference on a bill for tougher penalties for teachers who insult and attack schoolchildren, as organized by the newspaper Izvestia.

Since the introduction of Russia's self-isolation regime due to COVID-19, Volynets has offered to issue sick leave certificates to parents of children younger than 14 years old who have to provide childcare at home due to the quarantine. She also supports the online graduation initiative. She previously supported the initiative to ban students from using mobile phones in schools. Volynets suggested the possibility of registering marriages and divorces through the state services website and doubling the term of applications for divorce due to restrictions caused by the pandemic, as well as the introduction of an allowance for families in need with children in self-isolation. Volynets additionally proposed free distribution of and an allowance for the purchase of masks and gloves until the end of quarantine, which was supported by State Duma deputy Yaroslav Nilov.
