= Vladimir Putin 2018 presidential campaign =

2018 Russia presidential campaign of Vladimir Putin

Vladimir Putin for President
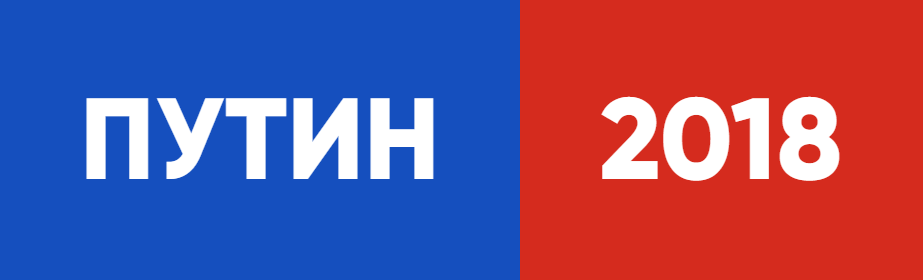
- Campaign: 2018 Russian presidential election
- Candidate: Vladimir Putin; Incumbent President of Russia (2000–2008 and 2012–present); Prime Minister of Russia (1999–2000 and 2008–2012); Director of Federal Security Service (1998–1999)
- Affiliation: Independent
- Status: Announced: 6 December 2017; Official nominee: 26 December 2017; Registered candidate: 6 February 2018; Won election: 18 March 2018
- Headquarters: 36 New Arbat Avenue; Moscow
- Key people: Co-chairs: Yelena Shmelyova; Sergey Kogogin; Alexander Rumyantsev; Chief of staff: Andrey Yarin; Press Secretary: Andrey Kondrashov
- Receipts: 400,030,934.98 roubles
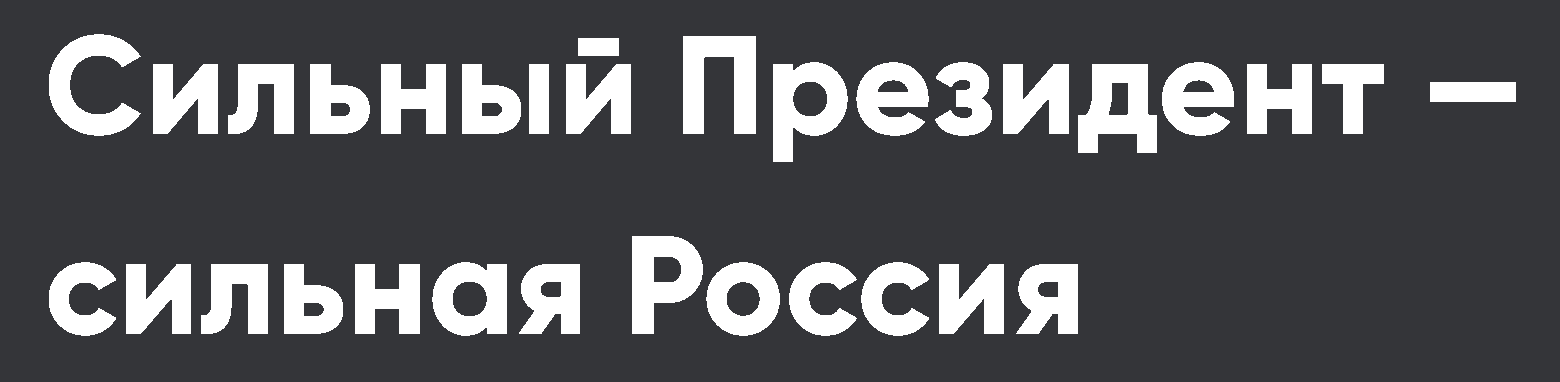
- Slogan(s): (Strong President, Strong Russia)

Website
- putin2018.ru

The 2018 presidential campaign of Vladimir Putin was announced on 6 December 2017, during Putin's speech at the GAZ automobile plant. He is the 4th and incumbent President of Russia; previously he was the 33rd Prime Minister of Russia, 2nd President of Russia and 4th Federal Security Service Director.

This campaign is his fourth. Prior to this he successfully participated in elections in 2000, 2004 and 2012.

Vladimir Putin had consistently scored higher than 40% in opinion polls since the last presidential election. According to an opinion poll conducted in December 2017 by Gallup International, if Putin was not to be on the ballot, 46% wouldn't have known for whom to vote and 19% would have made the ballot paper invalid. Putin was re-elected as the President of the Russian Federation on 18 March 2018.

== Background ==
Putin became the President in 2012. According to the Constitution of Russia he is entitled to another re-election. Until December 2017 it was not clear whether Putin would seek re-election or not. Some political analysts believed that Putin was not going to run, which is why he refused to answer questions about his nomination. Some named Governor of Tula Oblast Alexey Dyumin as Putin's successor. Others, on the contrary, believed that Putin would participate in the elections, but would announce it as late as possible in order to conduct a short campaign.

=== Announcement ===
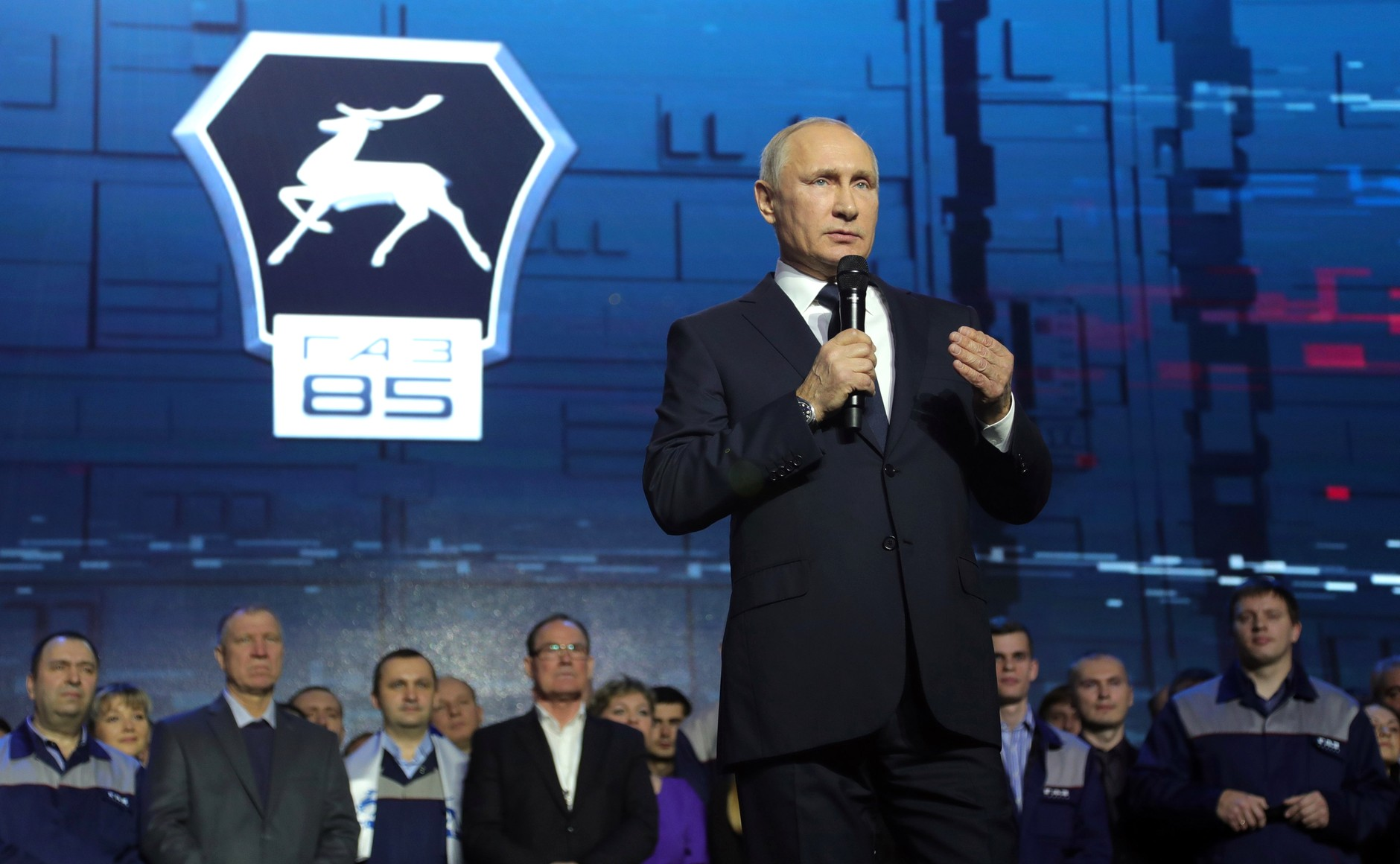
Putin announces his nomination as a candidate for the 2018 Russian presidential election.

It was assumed that Putin would announce his nomination on 14 December 2017, during his annual press conference. However, at the beginning of December 2017, some experts said that Putin would announce his participation in the elections on 6 December, during the Volunteer of Russia 2017 awards. Putin's press Secretary Dmitry Peskov, commenting on these reports said that Putin could announce the nomination any day. On 6 December, after the presentation of awards, Putin declined to answer the question about participation in the elections, saying that in the near future he will decide on whether to participate in the election. A few hours later, speaking to the workers of the GAZ automobile plant, Putin announced that he will again run for president.

=== Nomination ===
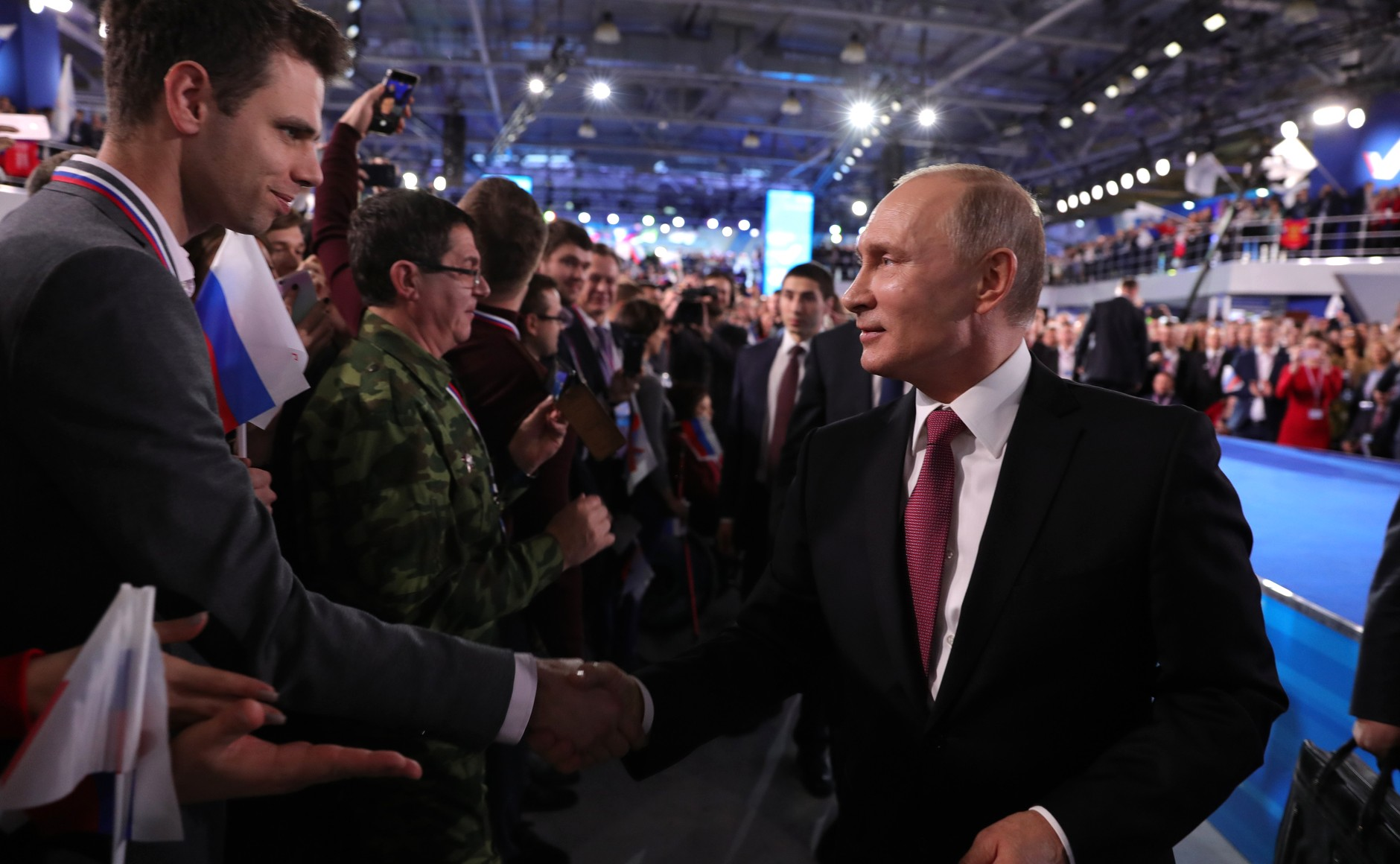
Putin at a forum held by the All-Russia People's Front on 19 December 2017

In the 2012 election, Putin was nominated by the United Russia party, which he led at the time. Putin announced that he will run as an independent on 14 December 2017 during his annual press conference. This is the third time he will run as an independent. He will have to collect at least 300,000 signatures in his support, only then will he be admitted to the election.

The official nomination of Putin took place at a meeting of his initiative group on 26 December 2017. The initiative group included 668 people, among them the former Minister of Economics Alexander Shokhin, hockey player Alexander Karelin, Moscow State University rector Viktor Sadovnichy, Director of Bakulev Scientific Center of Cardiovascular Surgery Leo Boqueria, Senator and Secretary-General of United Russia Andrey Turchak, the President of Support of Russia Alexander Kalinin, co-founder of Kaspersky Lab Natalya Kaspersky, leader of the party A Just Russia Sergey Mironov, as well as members of the State Duma and senators.

== Campaign ==
On 27 December 2017, Putin submitted documents for participation in the elections to the Central Election Commission. On 28 December, the CEC registered the initiative group and allowed him to start collecting signatures.

=== Collection of signatures ===
On 5 January 2018, signatures started being collected in support of Putin. It was necessary to collect from 300,000 to 315,000 signatures to be admitted to the elections. In each subject of the Russian Federation it was necessary to collect no more than 7,500 signatures.

By 12 January Putin had gathered the required number of signatures, and even exceeded this number by almost 100,000. Putin's staff decided to continue collecting signatures. In total the campaign gathered more than 1.5 million signatures, of which around 315,000 were submitted to the CEC on 29 January.

By 2 February they had been verified - only 232 signatures were deemed invalid.

=== Visits and campaign ===
On 7 February Putin visited Krasnoyarsk. Although it was officially a work trip many believe it was linked to his campaign. His visit was linked to the preparation to the Universaide, which will be held in the winter of 2019. Before addressing the issue he visited the multi-functional sports center Sopka. During the meeting concerning the issue Putin noted that Russia "without a doubt remains a leader in international sport" - this was the year before Russia was banned from international sport (see Doping in Russia). Next he went to a council concerning ecological problems. Near the end of his visit he entered the sport watching complex Platinum Arena Krasnoyarsk, where he took photos with training hockey players and met with the three players of the youth team Totem. To conclude his visit he inspected the new terminal of the aeroport Yemelyanovo.

On 8 February President Putin visited Novosibirsk. The main topic for the visit was the scientific potential of the state. He met with members of SO RAN and congratulated them with the day of science. He visited the nuclear science institute Budker. He met with Andrey Travnikov, who is Acting Governor of Novosibirsk Oblast. He was present at the meeting of the council for education and science, where he revealed a few details of the speech he would give to the Federal Assembly.

During his campaign he refused to take part in any presidential debates personally like he did in previous ones in 2000, 2004 and 2012, citing his spokesman, being "too busy". Though he was presented by his representative and his most presidential campaign is done by his trusted figures.

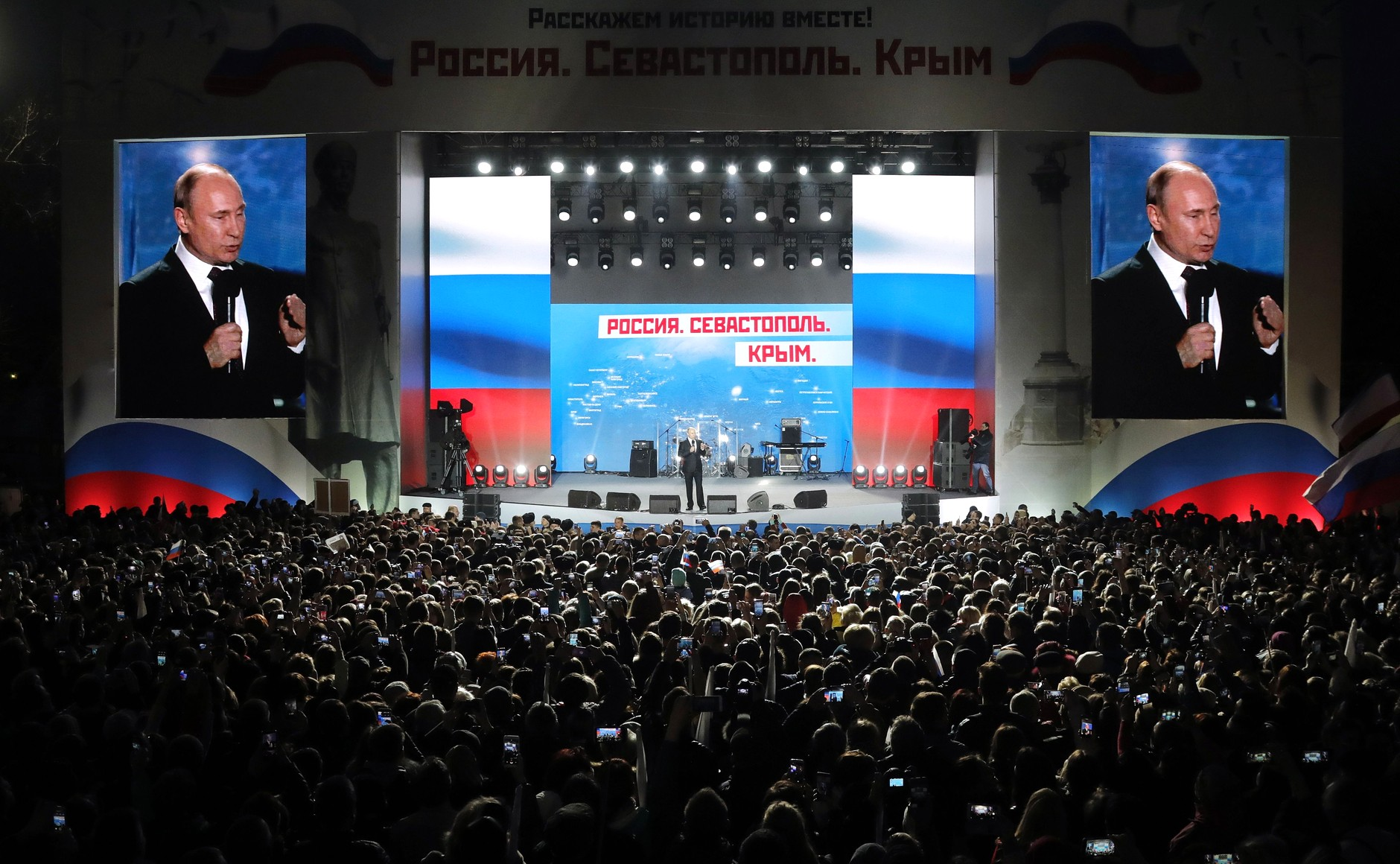
Vladimir Putin rally in Sevastopol.

On 3 March, in Moscow at the Luzhniki stadium held a rally in support of Vladimir Putin. In total, more than 130,000 people came to the rally. The rally was made by confidants of Putin, among whom were star athletes, figures of culture and science. Speaking at the meeting, Vladimir Putin said: "We want to make our country bright, looking forward to the future, because our ancestors lived here, we live, our children live and our children and grandchildren will live. We will do everything to make them happy. For us and apart from us no one else will. But if we do this, the next 10 years, the entire XXI century will be marked by our bright victories. We'll do it!".

On 14 March, Vladimir Putin spoke at a rally in Sevastopol to mark the anniversary of the Crimean status referendum.

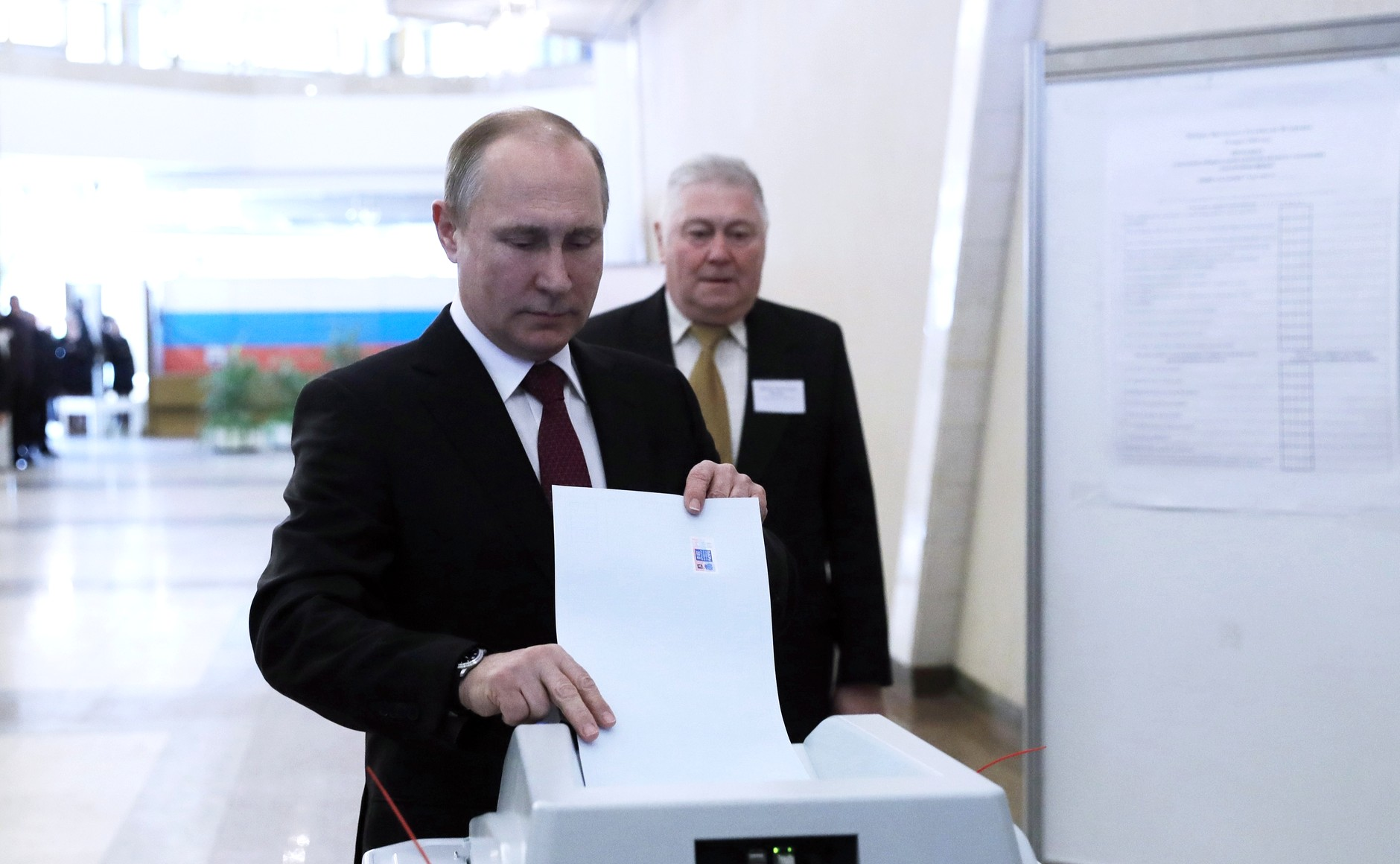
Vladimir Putin voted in the election.

On 18 March, Vladimir Putin voted in the presidential election. He voted at a traditional polling station located in the building of the Russian Academy of Sciences.

=== Hiding the pension reform plan ===
Shortly after Putin’s re-election, the appointed Russian government released the plan of the pension reform involving a substantial increase of the national retirement age; in October 2018 Putin signed the corresponding bill into law. However, during the presidential campaign, nothing was said by Putin on this subject — so that Russian citizens would not expect any changes in this socially-sensitive area. Moreover, for many years Putin promised not to hike the retirement age, and in several articles published by Russian media before the election, the existence of any intentions to change the pension age until 2030 were denied.

In the aftermath, more than 60% of Russians interpreted his silence as a trick aimed at securing victory in the election, which would have been questionable if he had presented his plan in advance. All this has severely affected Putin’s reputation, Forbes estimated the whole story as cynical and heavily compromising the leader of the nation.

== Endorsements ==
=== Parties supporting Putin's presidential bid ===
The following political parties support Putin in the election:

- A Just Russia
- Cities of Russia
- Civic Platform
- Civilian Power
- Great Fatherland Party
- Greens
- Labor Party
- Party for Fairness!
- Party of Free Citizens
- Party of Pensioners
- Patriots of Russia
- Rodina
- United Russia
- Women's Dialogue

=== PutinTeam ===
PutinTeam logo

The PutinTeam movement was created by ice hockey player Alexander Ovechkin on 2 November 2017 in support of Vladimir Putin.

In addition to Ovechkin, the PutinTeam movement also includes many Russian sportspeople, actors, musicians and social activists: Evgeni Malkin, Yelena Isinbayeva, Sergey Karjakin, Sergey Tetyukhin, Nikolay Rastorguyev, Polina Gagarina, Ilya Kovalchuk, Nyusha, Andrey Merzlikin, Pavel Bure, Evgeni Plushenko, Nikolay Baskov, Sergei Krikalev, Mikhail Galustyan and others. Anyone can join PutinTeam on the website of movement.

== People ==
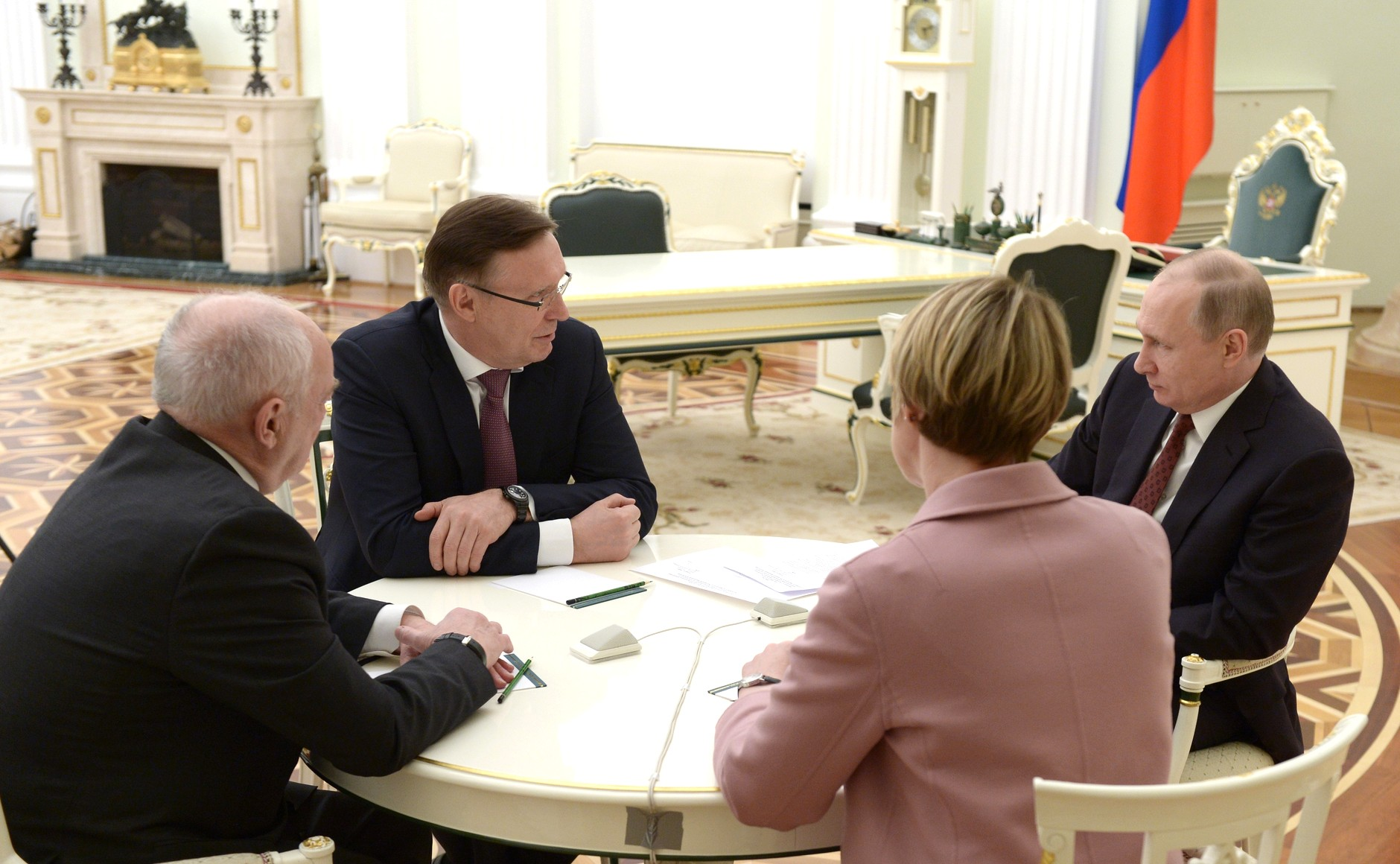
Putin with co-chairs of his headquarters

On 10 January 2018, Putin's election headquarters held its first organizational meeting. Putin was present and announced the leaders of the headquarters: head of Kamaz Sergey Kogogin; head of Sirius center for gifted children Yelena Shmelyova; and CEO of Rogachev National Medical Research Center for Pediatric Oncology Alexander Rumyantsev.

The chief of staff was Andrey Yarin.

The press secretary of the headquarters was the journalist Andrey Kondrashov.

== Potential Prime Ministers ==
According to Russian law, after the inauguration of the elected President of Russia, the incumbent Prime Minister is obliged to resign, and the President has to appoint a new head of government, or re-assign the current one.

According to political analysts, the Prime Minister appointed during the fourth and last term of Putin will most likely be his successor as President in 2024.

In addition, one of the main contenders was the incumbent Prime Minister Dmitry Medvedev, despite the fact that his popularity has declined in 2017 as the result of a corruption scandal, although he still remained the second most popular politician in Russia after Putin. Some political technologists called his chances of remaining in office close to 100 percent.

=== Shortlist ===
In the shortlist of potential candidates for Prime Minister in case of victory of Vladimir Putin, various media, citing its sources included the following people:

- Andrey Belousov, Economic Presidential Assistant and former Minister of Economic Development
- Sergey Chemezov, CEO of Rostec
- Arkady Dvorkovich, Deputy Prime Minister
- Tatyana Golikova, Head of the Account Chamber
- Olga Golodets, Deputy Prime Minister
- Herman Gref, Chairman and CEO of Sberbank and former Minister of Economic Development
- Vladimir Gruzdev, former Governor of Tula Oblast
- Sergey Kiriyenko, Kremlin First Deputy Chief of Staff and former Prime Minister
- Alexei Kudrin, former Minister of Finance
- Denis Manturov, Minister of Industry and Trade
- Valentina Matviyenko, Chairwoman of the Federation Council
- Dmitry Medvedev, incumbent Prime Minister
- Alexey Miller, CEO of Gazprom
- Elvira Nabiullina, Chairwoman of the Central Bank and former Minister of Economic Development
- Alexander Novak, Minister of Energy
- Maxim Oreshkin, Minister of Economic Development
- Sergei Prikhodko, Deputy Prime Minister
- Dmitry Pristanskov, Head of the Federal Agency for State Property Management
- Igor Shuvalov, First Deputy Prime Minister
- Veronika Skvortsova, Minister of Health
- Sergey Sobyanin, Mayor of Moscow
- Maxim Topilin, Minister of Labour and Social Affairs
- Yury Trutnev, Deputy Prime Minister
- Anton Vaino, Kremlin Chief of Staff
- Vyacheslav Volodin, Chairman of the State Duma

On 7 May 2018, after being inaugurated, Vladimir Putin proposed to appoint Dmitry Medvedev as Prime Minister again.

== Result ==
Result by regions

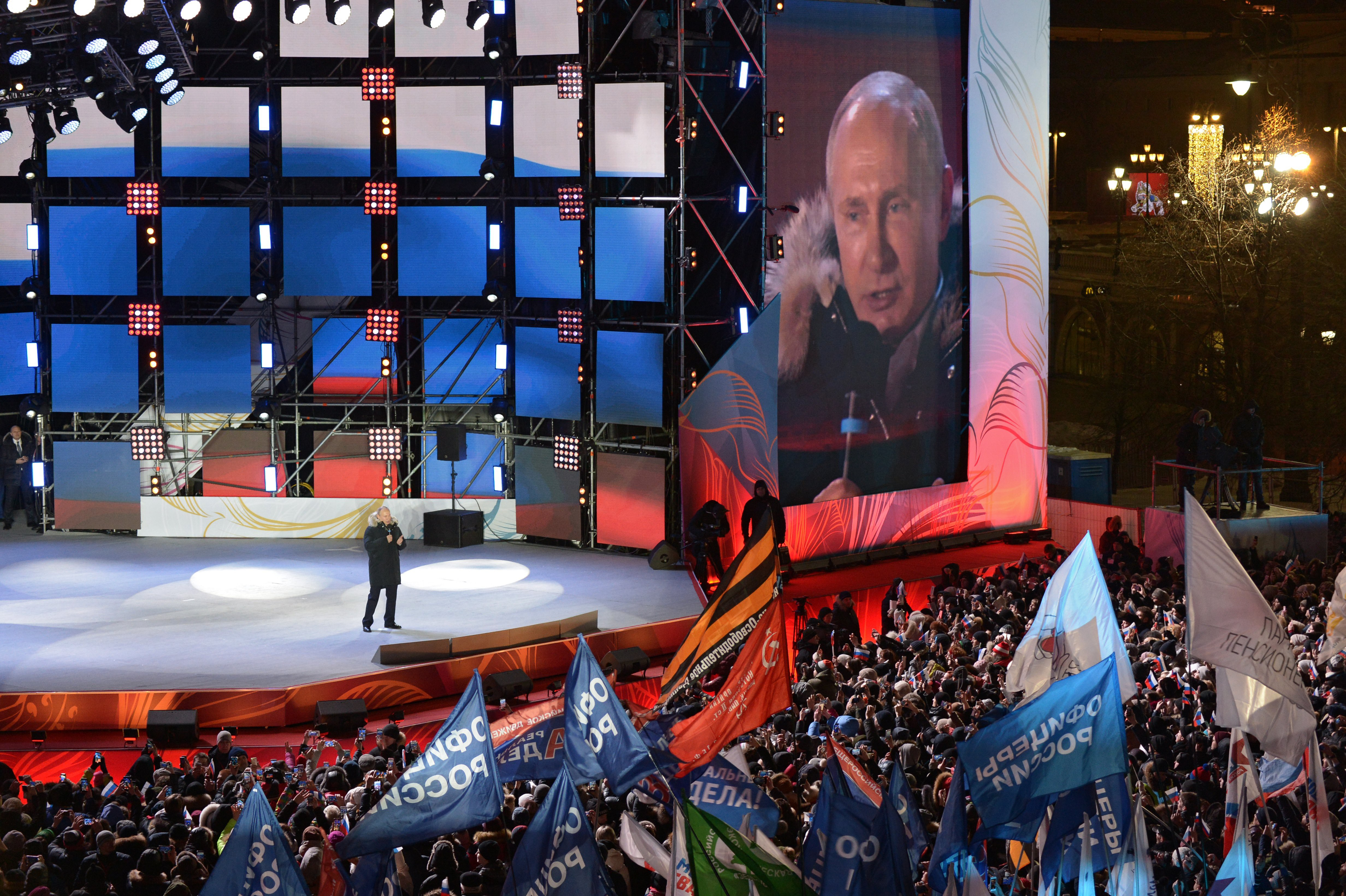
Speech by Vladimir Putin at a rally in Manezhnaya square after winning the election on 18 March 2018

Vladimir Putin, as expected, won the election, gaining 56,430,712 votes (more than 76%). This result was the largest in the history of the Russian presidential elections.

Putin received the greatest share of votes in Chechnya, Crimea, Dagestan, Kabardino-Balkaria, Sevastopol and Tuva, and in each of these regions he gained more than 90%. In Yakutia and Altai Krai, Putin received only over 64% of votes.

== See also ==
- Vladimir Putin 2000 presidential campaign
- Vladimir Putin 2004 presidential campaign
- Vladimir Putin 2012 presidential campaign
- Vladimir Putin 2024 presidential campaign
