= Volynets (surname) =

Volynets (Ukrainian: Волинець), also spelled Volynec, Wolyniec (Polish: Wołyniec), and Wolynetz, is a surname referring to Volhynia.

== People ==
=== Volynets ===
- Danylo Volynets (born 2002), Ukrainian footballer
- Irina Volynets (born 1978), Russian journalist and human rights activist
- Katie Volynets (born 2001), American tennis player
- Oleksandr Volynets (born 1974), Ukrainian swimmer
- Yevhen Volynets (born 1993), Ukrainian footballer

=== Other forms ===
- Bogdan Wolynetz, a character in American TV series Breaking Bad
- John Wolyniec (born 1977), American soccer coach
