= Opinion polling for the 2018 Russian presidential election =

Opinion polling for the Russian presidential election, 2018

This page lists public opinion polls in connection with the 2018 Russian presidential election.

== Main opinion polls ==
Polls conducted since 8 February 2018, when all candidates were registered.

| Date | Poll source | | | | | | | | | Spoil the ballot | Undecided | Abstention |
| Date | Poll source | Putin | Grudinin | Zhirinovsky | Yavlinsky | Sobchak | Titov | Baburin | Suraykin | Spoil the ballot | Undecided | Abstention |
|---|---|---|---|---|---|---|---|---|---|---|---|---|
| 11 March | FOM | 64.9% | 6.2% | 6.7% | 0.5% | 0.7% | 0.4% | 0.2% | 0.3% | —N/a | —N/a | —N/a |
| 9 March | WCIOM | 69% | 7% | 5% | 1% | 2% | 0% | 1% | 0% | 1% | 11% | 3% |
| 4 March | WCIOM | 69.7% | 7.1% | 5.6% | 1.0% | 1.1% | 0.3% | 0.2% | 0.3% | 0.6% | 10.7% | 3.4% |
| 3-4 March | FOM | 64% | 6.5% | 6.6% | 0.7% | 1.2% | 0.2% | 0.2% | 0.1% | 1% | 13% | 6% |
| 26 February | WCIOM | 69.1% | 7.8% | 5.9% | 0.9% | 1.6% | 0.3% | 0.3% | 0.1% | 0.5% | 10.4% | 3.1% |
| 24-25 February | FOM | 64% | 6% | 7% | 1% | 1% | 0% | 0% | 0% | 1% | 13% | 6% |
| 16-22 February | FBK | 56% | 4% | 4% | <1% | <1% | <1% | <1% | <1% | —N/a | 32% | —N/a |
| 17-18 February | FOM | 67% | 6% | 6% | 1% | 1% | 0% | 0% | 0% | 1% | 11% | 7% |
| 18 February | WCIOM | 69.5% | 7.5% | 5.3% | 1.4% | 0.9% | 0.3% | 0.4% | 0.1% | 0.6% | 10.6% | 3.4% |
| 17 February | Start of campaigning in the media | | | | | | | | | | | |
| 9-14 February | FBK | 57% | 5% | 4% | <1% | 1% | <1% | <1% | <1% | —N/a | 30% | —N/a |
| 10-11 February | FOM | 67% | 5% | 5% | 0% | 1% | 0% | 0% | 0% | 1% | 12% | 7% |
| 11 February | WCIOM | 71.5% | 7.3% | 5.5% | 0.8% | 1.0% | 0.2% | 0.5% | 0.1% | 0.8% | 9.3% | 3.0% |

== Most favorite for president ==
| Date | Poll source | | | | | | | | | Nobody | Difficult to answer |
| Date | Poll source | Putin | Grudinin | Zhirinovsky | Yavlinsky | Sobchak | Titov | Baburin | Suraykin | Nobody | Difficult to answer |
|---|---|---|---|---|---|---|---|---|---|---|---|
| 11 Mar 2018 | FOM | 72.6% | 12.0% | 13.7% | 2.9% | 2.4% | 2.5% | 2.6% | 1.9% | —N/a | —N/a |
| 25 Feb 2018 | FOM | 70.6% | 10.4% | 17.1% | 2.7% | 2.0% | 1.7% | 2.3% | 1.2% | 11.5% | 4.3% |
| 22 Feb 2018 | FOM | 74.1% | 10.1% | 14.8% | 2.3% | 1.3% | 1.2% | 1.6% | 0.6% | 11.3% | 3.1% |
| 11 Feb 2018 | FOM | 74.3% | 9.7% | 15.0% | 2.5% | 2.2% | 1.7% | 1.5% | 0.6% | 11.3% | 3.2% |
| 4 Feb 2018 | FOM | 73.3% | 10.0% | 15.9% | 3.2% | 2.5% | 2.0% | —N/a | —N/a | 11.4% | 3.2% |
| 28 Jan 2018 | FOM | 75.0% | 9.5% | 13.5% | 2.1% | 1.8% | 1.2% | —N/a | —N/a | 9.9% | 3.0% |

== Least favorite for president ==
| Date | Poll source | | | | | | | | | Nobody | Difficult to answer |
| Date | Poll source | Putin | Grudinin | Zhirinovsky | Yavlinsky | Sobchak | Titov | Baburin | Suraykin | Nobody | Difficult to answer |
|---|---|---|---|---|---|---|---|---|---|---|---|
| 11 Mar 2018 | FOM | 6.2% | 15.0% | 17.7% | 14.7% | 57.0% | 8.9% | 8.5% | 8.3% | —N/a | —N/a |
| 25 Feb 2018 | FOM | 7.5% | 13.1% | 14.9% | 14.2% | 57.2% | 7.9% | 7.9% | 6.9% | 22.3% | 5.7% |
| 22 Feb 2018 | FOM | 6.2% | 13.5% | 16.0% | 15.4% | 57.5% | 7.7% | 7.5% | 7.2% | 22.3% | 5.6% |
| 11 Feb 2018 | FOM | 6.1% | 10.7% | 14.9% | 13.9% | 58.5% | 6.7% | 7.5% | 6.5% | 22.1% | 6.2% |
| 4 Feb 2018 | FOM | 6.7% | 10.2% | 16.7% | 16.8% | 58.6% | 7.9% | —N/a | —N/a | 20.8% | 6.3% |
| 28 Jan 2018 | FOM | 6.5% | 8.5% | 15.5% | 16.0% | 59.0% | 6.4% | —N/a | —N/a | 21.0% | 5.6% |

== Early opinion polls ==
Polls conducted before the completion of the official registration of candidates.

| Date | Poll source | | | | | | | | | | | | | | | | | | | Other | Undecided | Abstention |
| Date | Poll source | Putin | Medvedev | Matviyenko | Shoygu | Sobyanin | Zyuganov | Grudinin | Prokhorov | Zhirinovsky | Mironov | Yavlinsky | Kasyanov | Navalny | Rogozin | Khodorkovsky | Sobchak | Titov | Gordon | Other | Undecided | Abstention |
|---|---|---|---|---|---|---|---|---|---|---|---|---|---|---|---|---|---|---|---|---|---|---|
| 8 Feb 2018 | Ksenia Sobchak and Maxim Suraykin registered as presidential candidates | | | | | | | | | | | | | | | | | | | | | |
| 7 Feb 2018 | Sergey Baburin, Boris Titov and Grigory Yavlinsky registered as presidential candidates | | | | | | | | | | | | | | | | | | | | | |
| 6 Feb 2018 | Vladimir Putin registered as a presidential candidate | | | | | | | | | | | | | | | | | | | | | |
| 4 Feb 2018 | FOM | 66.3% | —N/a | —N/a | —N/a | —N/a | —N/a | 5.5% | —N/a | 6.5% | —N/a | 0.5% | —N/a | —N/a | —N/a | —N/a | 1.2% | 0.1% | —N/a | 0.9% | 11.2% | 7.6% |
| 29 Jun – 4 Feb 2018 | WCIOM | 71.4% | —N/a | —N/a | —N/a | —N/a | —N/a | 6.9% | —N/a | 5.7% | —N/a | 0.7% | —N/a | —N/a | —N/a | —N/a | 1.3% | 0.4% | —N/a | 0.7% | 9.2% | 3.2% |
| 26-31 Jan 2018 | FBK | 60% | —N/a | —N/a | —N/a | —N/a | —N/a | 5% | —N/a | 5% | —N/a | <1% | —N/a | —N/a | —N/a | —N/a | <1% | <1% | —N/a | 2% | 25% | —N/a |
| 27-28 Jan 2018 | FOM | 69% | —N/a | —N/a | —N/a | —N/a | —N/a | 6% | —N/a | 6% | —N/a | 1% | —N/a | —N/a | —N/a | —N/a | 1% | 0% | —N/a | 0% | 9% | 7% |
| 26–28 Jan 2018 | WCIOM | 69.9% | —N/a | —N/a | —N/a | —N/a | —N/a | 7.2% | —N/a | 5.9% | —N/a | 0.9% | —N/a | —N/a | —N/a | —N/a | 1.2% | 0.3% | —N/a | 1.0% | 9.2% | 3.7% |
| 21 Jan 2018 | FOM | 67% | —N/a | —N/a | —N/a | —N/a | —N/a | 6% | —N/a | 6% | —N/a | 1% | —N/a | —N/a | —N/a | —N/a | 1% | 0% | —N/a | 1% | 9% | 8% |
| 15-18 Jan 2018 | FBK | 62% | —N/a | —N/a | —N/a | —N/a | —N/a | 6% | —N/a | 6% | —N/a | <1% | —N/a | —N/a | —N/a | —N/a | <1% | <1% | —N/a | 2% | 21% | —N/a |
| 15 Jan 2018 | WCIOM | 73.2% | —N/a | —N/a | —N/a | —N/a | —N/a | 6.1% | —N/a | 6.1% | —N/a | 0.8% | —N/a | —N/a | —N/a | —N/a | 1.2% | 0.3% | —N/a | 0.6% | 5.6% | 5.5% |
| 14 Jan 2018 | FOM | 65.9% | —N/a | —N/a | —N/a | —N/a | —N/a | 6.2% | —N/a | 6.0% | —N/a | <1% | —N/a | —N/a | —N/a | —N/a | 1.5% | <1% | —N/a | 1.1% | 7.9% | 9.1% |
| 12 Jan 2018 | Pavel Grudinin registered as a presidential candidate | | | | | | | | | | | | | | | | | | | | | |
| 8–10 Jan 2018 | WCIOM | 54.3% | —N/a | —N/a | —N/a | —N/a | —N/a | 5.1% | —N/a | 2.8% | —N/a | 0.4% | —N/a | —N/a | —N/a | —N/a | 0.5% | 0.3% | —N/a | 0.4% | 13.6% | 4.0% |
| 27–30 Dec 2017 | CIPKR | 58% | —N/a | —N/a | —N/a | —N/a | —N/a | 7% | —N/a | 3% | —N/a | >1% | —N/a | —N/a | —N/a | —N/a | 2% | >1% | —N/a | 2% | 17% | 7% |
| 29 Dec 2017 | Vladimir Zhirinovsky registered as a presidential candidate | | | | | | | | | | | | | | | | | | | | | |
| 25 Dec 2017 | CEC rejects Alexei Navalny’s presidential bid | | | | | | | | | | | | | | | | | | | | | |
| 23–24 Dec 2017 | FOM | 68% | —N/a | —N/a | —N/a | —N/a | 4% | —N/a | —N/a | 7% | —N/a | 1% | —N/a | —N/a | —N/a | —N/a | 1% | 0% | —N/a | 1% | 7% | 9% |
| 23 Dec 2017 | Pavel Grudinin announces his intention to run | | | | | | | | | | | | | | | | | | | | | |
| 18 Dec 2017 | Election campaign begins | | | | | | | | | | | | | | | | | | | | | |
| 15–17 Dec 2017 | WCIOM | 58.7% | —N/a | —N/a | —N/a | —N/a | 2.3% | —N/a | —N/a | 2.9% | —N/a | 0.6% | —N/a | —N/a | —N/a | —N/a | 0.2% | 0.5% | —N/a | —N/a | 12% | 7% |
| 15 Dec 2017 | Federation Council appoints the presidential election | | | | | | | | | | | | | | | | | | | | | |
| 11 Dec 2017 | FOM | 67% | —N/a | —N/a | —N/a | —N/a | 4% | —N/a | —N/a | 8% | —N/a | 1% | —N/a | —N/a | —N/a | —N/a | 1% | 0% | —N/a | 1% | 8% | 8% |
| 6 Dec 2017 | Vladimir Putin announces his intention to run | | | | | | | | | | | | | | | | | | | | | |
| 1–5 Dec 2017 | Levada Centre | 61% | —N/a | —N/a | —N/a | —N/a | 6% | —N/a | —N/a | 8% | 2% | 1% | —N/a | —N/a | —N/a | —N/a | 1% | <1% | 1% | 3% | 10% | 9% |
| 4 Dec 2017 | ROMIR | 60% | —N/a | —N/a | —N/a | —N/a | 5.6% | —N/a | —N/a | 6.4% | 1.6% | 1.6% | 0% | 2.4% | —N/a | —N/a | 1.6% | —N/a | —N/a | 1% | 8% | 11% |
| 3 Dec 2017 | FOM | 68% | —N/a | —N/a | —N/a | —N/a | 4% | —N/a | —N/a | 7% | —N/a | 1% | —N/a | —N/a | —N/a | —N/a | 1% | 0% | —N/a | 1% | 8% | 8% |
| 26 Nov 2017 | Boris Titov announces his intention to run | | | | | | | | | | | | | | | | | | | | | |
| 26 Nov 2017 | FOM | 68% | —N/a | —N/a | —N/a | —N/a | 4% | —N/a | —N/a | 7% | —N/a | 1% | —N/a | —N/a | —N/a | —N/a | 1% | —N/a | —N/a | 3% | 9% | 9% |
| 24–28 Nov 2017 | Levada Centre | 53% | —N/a | —N/a | 1% | —N/a | 3% | —N/a | —N/a | 4% | 1% | <1% | —N/a | 1% | —N/a | —N/a | 1% | —N/a | —N/a | 1% | 15% | 11% |
| 11–12 Nov 2017 | FOM | 68% | —N/a | —N/a | —N/a | —N/a | 4% | —N/a | —N/a | 7% | —N/a | 1% | —N/a | —N/a | —N/a | —N/a | 2% | —N/a | —N/a | 2% | 8% | 8% |
| 4–5 Nov 2017 | FOM | 68% | —N/a | —N/a | —N/a | —N/a | 4% | —N/a | —N/a | 7% | —N/a | 1% | —N/a | —N/a | —N/a | —N/a | 1% | —N/a | —N/a | 2% | 7% | 8% |
| 20–24 Oct 2017 | Levada Centre | 53% | <1% | —N/a | 1% | —N/a | 2% | —N/a | —N/a | 3% | <1% | <1% | —N/a | 2% | —N/a | —N/a | <1% | —N/a | —N/a | <1% | 20% | 11% |
| 18 Oct 2017 | Ksenia Sobchak announces her intention to run | | | | | | | | | | | | | | | | | | | | | |
| 15–19 Sep 2017 | Levada Centre | 52% | <1% | —N/a | <1% | —N/a | 2% | —N/a | —N/a | 2% | <1% | <1% | —N/a | 1% | —N/a | —N/a | —N/a | —N/a | —N/a | 1% | 23% | 9% |
| 18–22 Aug 2017 | Levada Centre | 48% | <1% | —N/a | 1% | —N/a | 2% | —N/a | —N/a | 2% | <1% | <1% | —N/a | 1% | —N/a | —N/a | —N/a | —N/a | —N/a | 1% | 24% | 10% |
| 28 Jul 2017 | FOM | 66% | —N/a | —N/a | —N/a | —N/a | 4% | —N/a | 1% | 8% | 1% | —N/a | —N/a | —N/a | —N/a | —N/a | —N/a | —N/a | —N/a | 2% | 9% | 9% |
| 19–22 May 2017 | Levada Centre | 63% | —N/a | —N/a | —N/a | —N/a | 3% | —N/a | —N/a | 6% | 1% | 1% | <1% | 2% | —N/a | —N/a | —N/a | —N/a | —N/a | —N/a | 14% | 9% |
| 10 May 2017 | FOM | 62% | —N/a | —N/a | —N/a | —N/a | 5% | —N/a | 1% | 9% | 1% | —N/a | —N/a | —N/a | —N/a | —N/a | —N/a | —N/a | —N/a | 1% | 10% | 9% |
| 28 Apr 2017 | FOM | 62% | —N/a | —N/a | —N/a | —N/a | 5% | —N/a | 1% | 9% | 0% | —N/a | —N/a | —N/a | —N/a | —N/a | —N/a | —N/a | —N/a | 1% | 10% | 9% |
| 21–24 Apr 2017 | Levada Centre | 48% | 1% | —N/a | 1% | —N/a | 3% | —N/a | <1% | 3% | 1% | —N/a | —N/a | 1% | —N/a | —N/a | —N/a | —N/a | —N/a | 1% | 19% | 13% |
| 7 Apr 2017 | FOM | 66% | —N/a | —N/a | —N/a | —N/a | 4% | —N/a | 1% | 10% | 1% | —N/a | —N/a | —N/a | —N/a | —N/a | —N/a | —N/a | —N/a | 1% | 8% | 8% |
| 1 Mar 2017 | FOM | 67% | —N/a | —N/a | —N/a | —N/a | 4% | —N/a | 1% | 9% | 1% | —N/a | —N/a | —N/a | —N/a | —N/a | —N/a | —N/a | —N/a | 1% | 8% | 8% |
| 17 Feb 2017 | FOM | 66% | —N/a | —N/a | —N/a | —N/a | 4% | —N/a | 1% | 9% | 1% | —N/a | —N/a | —N/a | —N/a | —N/a | —N/a | —N/a | —N/a | 1% | 7% | 10% |
| 30 Jan 2017 | FOM | 65% | —N/a | —N/a | —N/a | —N/a | 4% | —N/a | 1% | 10% | 1% | —N/a | —N/a | —N/a | —N/a | —N/a | —N/a | —N/a | —N/a | 1% | 8% | 9% |
| 22 Jan 2017 | FOM | 65% | —N/a | —N/a | —N/a | —N/a | 4% | —N/a | 1% | 11% | 1% | —N/a | —N/a | —N/a | —N/a | —N/a | —N/a | —N/a | —N/a | 1% | 7% | 9% |
| 30 Dec 2016 | FOM | 67% | —N/a | —N/a | —N/a | —N/a | 4% | —N/a | 1% | 8% | 1% | —N/a | —N/a | —N/a | —N/a | —N/a | —N/a | —N/a | —N/a | 1% | 8% | 9% |
| 23 Dec 2016 | FOM | 65% | —N/a | —N/a | —N/a | —N/a | 5% | —N/a | 1% | 9% | 1% | —N/a | —N/a | —N/a | —N/a | —N/a | —N/a | —N/a | —N/a | 1% | 7% | 10% |
| 16 Dec 2016 | FOM | 66% | —N/a | —N/a | —N/a | —N/a | 5% | —N/a | 1% | 10% | 1% | —N/a | —N/a | —N/a | —N/a | —N/a | —N/a | —N/a | —N/a | 1% | 6% | 9% |
| 13 Dec 2016 | Alexei Navalny announces his intention to run | | | | | | | | | | | | | | | | | | | | | |
| 9 Dec 2016 | FOM | 66% | —N/a | —N/a | —N/a | —N/a | 5% | —N/a | 1% | 10% | 1% | —N/a | —N/a | —N/a | —N/a | —N/a | —N/a | —N/a | —N/a | 0% | 7% | 9% |
| 2 Dec 2016 | FOM | 65% | —N/a | —N/a | —N/a | —N/a | 5% | —N/a | 1% | 10% | 1% | —N/a | —N/a | —N/a | —N/a | —N/a | —N/a | —N/a | —N/a | 1% | 7% | 9% |
| 25 Nov 2016 | FOM | 63% | —N/a | —N/a | —N/a | —N/a | 5% | —N/a | 1% | 11% | 1% | —N/a | —N/a | —N/a | —N/a | —N/a | —N/a | —N/a | —N/a | 1% | 7% | 9% |
| 18 Nov 2016 | FOM | 62% | —N/a | —N/a | —N/a | —N/a | 5% | —N/a | 1% | 11% | 1% | —N/a | —N/a | —N/a | —N/a | —N/a | —N/a | —N/a | —N/a | 1% | 8% | 10% |
| 11 Nov 2016 | FOM | 63% | —N/a | —N/a | —N/a | —N/a | 5% | —N/a | 1% | 10% | 1% | —N/a | —N/a | —N/a | —N/a | —N/a | —N/a | —N/a | —N/a | 1% | 7% | 10% |
| 28 Oct 2016 | FOM | 64% | —N/a | —N/a | —N/a | —N/a | 5% | —N/a | 1% | 11% | 1% | —N/a | —N/a | —N/a | —N/a | —N/a | —N/a | —N/a | —N/a | 1% | 8% | 8% |
| 28 Oct 2016 | Vladimir Zhirinovsky announces his intention to run | | | | | | | | | | | | | | | | | | | | | |
| 21 Oct 2016 | FOM | 63% | —N/a | —N/a | —N/a | —N/a | 5% | —N/a | 1% | 13% | 1% | —N/a | —N/a | —N/a | —N/a | —N/a | —N/a | —N/a | —N/a | 1% | 7% | 8% |
| 14 Oct 2016 | FOM | 62% | —N/a | —N/a | —N/a | —N/a | 5% | —N/a | 1% | 12% | 1% | —N/a | —N/a | —N/a | —N/a | —N/a | —N/a | —N/a | —N/a | 1% | 7% | 9% |
| 7 Oct 2016 | FOM | 62% | —N/a | —N/a | —N/a | —N/a | 5% | —N/a | 1% | 11% | 1% | —N/a | —N/a | —N/a | —N/a | —N/a | —N/a | —N/a | —N/a | 1% | 8% | 9% |
| 30 Sep 2016 | FOM | 62% | —N/a | —N/a | —N/a | —N/a | 4% | —N/a | 1% | 12% | 1% | —N/a | —N/a | —N/a | —N/a | —N/a | —N/a | —N/a | —N/a | 1% | 8% | 9% |
| 18 Sep 2016 | Legislative election | | | | | | | | | | | | | | | | | | | | | |
| 10 Sep 2016 | FOM | 59% | —N/a | —N/a | —N/a | —N/a | 6% | —N/a | 1% | 11% | 2% | —N/a | —N/a | —N/a | —N/a | —N/a | —N/a | —N/a | —N/a | 1% | 9% | 9% |
| 19 Aug 2016 | FOM | 62% | —N/a | —N/a | —N/a | —N/a | 6% | —N/a | 2% | 9% | 2% | —N/a | —N/a | —N/a | —N/a | —N/a | —N/a | —N/a | —N/a | 1% | 9% | 9% |
| 22 Jul 2016 | FOM | 64% | —N/a | —N/a | —N/a | —N/a | 5% | —N/a | 1% | 9% | 2% | —N/a | —N/a | —N/a | —N/a | —N/a | —N/a | —N/a | —N/a | 1% | 8% | 9% |
| 5 Jun 2016 | FOM | 66% | —N/a | —N/a | —N/a | —N/a | 5% | —N/a | 1% | 9% | 1% | —N/a | —N/a | —N/a | —N/a | —N/a | —N/a | —N/a | —N/a | 1% | 7% | 9% |
| 18 Apr 2016 | FOM | 67% | —N/a | —N/a | —N/a | —N/a | 8% | —N/a | 1% | 5% | 1% | —N/a | —N/a | —N/a | —N/a | —N/a | —N/a | —N/a | —N/a | 1% | 7% | 9% |
| 16–18 Apr 2016 | CIMES | 49.3% | 1.8% | —N/a | 8.3% | —N/a | 2.5% | —N/a | —N/a | 8.1% | 0.6% | —N/a | —N/a | 3.9% | —N/a | 1.9% | —N/a | —N/a | —N/a | 6.4% | —N/a | —N/a |
| 19–20 Mar 2016 | FOM | 70% | —N/a | —N/a | 2% | —N/a | 5% | —N/a | 2% | 7% | 1% | —N/a | —N/a | —N/a | —N/a | —N/a | —N/a | —N/a | —N/a | 1% | 7% | 9% |
| 28 Feb 2016 | Grigory Yavlinsky announces his intention to run | | | | | | | | | | | | | | | | | | | | | |
| 22–25 Feb 2016 | Levada Centre | 53% | <1% | —N/a | 2% | —N/a | 4% | —N/a | <1% | 3% | 1% | —N/a | —N/a | 1% | —N/a | —N/a | —N/a | —N/a | —N/a | 1% | 17% | 11% |
| 7 Feb 2016 | FOM | 71% | —N/a | —N/a | 2% | —N/a | 4% | —N/a | 1% | 5% | 1% | —N/a | —N/a | —N/a | —N/a | —N/a | —N/a | —N/a | —N/a | 1% | 7% | 8% |
| 3–5 Nov 2015 | CIMES | 60.6% | 1.6% | —N/a | 2.0% | —N/a | 2.1% | —N/a | 7.3% | —N/a | 0.7% | —N/a | —N/a | 3.2% | —N/a | 2.6% | —N/a | —N/a | —N/a | —N/a | 6.4% | —N/a |
| 22–25 August 2014 | Levada Centre | 57% | 1% | —N/a | <1% | —N/a | 3% | —N/a | —N/a | 2% | 1% | —N/a | —N/a | 1% | —N/a | —N/a | —N/a | —N/a | —N/a | 1% | 23% | 12% |
| 24–25 May 2014 | WCIOM | 68% | 2% | 1% | 7% | 0% | 5% | —N/a | 1% | 5% | —N/a | 0% | 0% | —N/a | —N/a | —N/a | —N/a | —N/a | —N/a | 0% | 5% | 7% |
| 10–11 May 2014 | WCIOM | 66% | 4% | 0% | 7% | 0% | 5% | —N/a | 2% | 4% | —N/a | 0% | 1% | —N/a | —N/a | —N/a | —N/a | —N/a | —N/a | 1% | 3% | 7% |
| 23 Feb 2014 | WCIOM | 42% | 3% | 0% | 13% | 1% | 7% | —N/a | 2% | 6% | —N/a | —N/a | —N/a | 1% | 1% | —N/a | —N/a | —N/a | —N/a | 2% | 8% | 13% |
| 6 Oct 2013 | WCIOM | 46% | 3% | 1% | 7% | 1% | 8% | —N/a | 3% | 9% | —N/a | —N/a | —N/a | 2% | 1% | —N/a | —N/a | —N/a | —N/a | 1% | 6% | 12% |
| 15 May 2013 | FoRGO | 46.8% | —N/a | —N/a | —N/a | —N/a | 8.1% | —N/a | 4.8% | 7.0% | 1.9% | —N/a | —N/a | —N/a | —N/a | —N/a | —N/a | —N/a | —N/a | 5.4% | 9.8% | 13.5% |
| 4 Mar 2012 | 2012 Result | 63.6% | —N/a | —N/a | —N/a | —N/a | 17.2% | —N/a | 8.0% | 6.2% | 3.9% | —N/a | —N/a | —N/a | —N/a | —N/a | —N/a | —N/a | —N/a | —N/a | —N/a | —N/a |

== Subnational polls ==
=== Moscow ===
| Date | Poll source | | | | | | | | | Undecided |
| Date | Poll source | Putin | Grudinin | Zhirinovsky | Yavlinsky | Sobchak | Titov | Baburin | Suraykin | Undecided |
|---|---|---|---|---|---|---|---|---|---|---|
| 23 Feb - 1 Mar 2018 | FBK | 44% | 6% | 4% | 1% | 2% | <1% | <1% | <1% | 41% |

=== Chukotka Autonomous Okrug ===
| Date | Poll source | | | | | | | | | | Other | Undecided |
| Date | Poll source | Putin | Grudinin | Zhirinovsky | Yavlinsky | Sobchak | Titov | Baburin | Gordon | Suraykin | Other | Undecided |
|---|---|---|---|---|---|---|---|---|---|---|---|---|
| 7–9 Jan 2018 | Black Cube | 71.7% | 8.0% | 8.0% | 0.8% | 6.0% | 0.6% | 0.7% | 0.7% | 0.7% | 0.0% | 2.9% |

=== Jewish Autonomous Oblast ===
| Date | Poll source | | | | | | | | | | Other | Undecided |
| Date | Poll source | Putin | Grudinin | Zhirinovsky | Yavlinsky | Sobchak | Titov | Baburin | Gordon | Suraykin | Other | Undecided |
|---|---|---|---|---|---|---|---|---|---|---|---|---|
| 7–9 Jan 2018 | Black Cube | 62.1% | 8.7% | 9.2% | 0.7% | 0.7% | 1.1% | 1.4% | 0.7% | 1.0% | 3.2% | 11.2% |

=== Magadan Oblast ===
| Date | Poll source | | | | | | | | | | Other | Undecided |
| Date | Poll source | Putin | Grudinin | Zhirinovsky | Yavlinsky | Sobchak | Titov | Baburin | Gordon | Suraykin | Other | Undecided |
|---|---|---|---|---|---|---|---|---|---|---|---|---|
| 7–9 Jan 2018 | Black Cube | 56.1% | 9.7% | 10.1% | 0.8% | 4.0% | 0.8% | 2.9% | 0.0% | 0.5% | 5.0% | 10.1% |

=== Kamchatka Krai ===
| Date | Poll source | | | | | | | | | | Other | Undecided |
| Date | Poll source | Putin | Grudinin | Zhirinovsky | Yavlinsky | Sobchak | Titov | Baburin | Gordon | Suraykin | Other | Undecided |
|---|---|---|---|---|---|---|---|---|---|---|---|---|
| 7–9 Jan 2018 | Black Cube | 60.0% | 12.4% | 10.4% | 1.1% | 3.9% | 0.9% | 1.9% | 0.9% | 0.7% | 4.5% | 3.3% |

=== Sakhalin Oblast ===
| Date | Poll source | | | | | | | | | | Other | Undecided |
| Date | Poll source | Putin | Grudinin | Zhirinovsky | Yavlinsky | Sobchak | Titov | Baburin | Gordon | Suraykin | Other | Undecided |
|---|---|---|---|---|---|---|---|---|---|---|---|---|
| 7–9 Jan 2018 | Black Cube | 56.4% | 9.6% | 10.1% | 1.7% | 1.2% | 0.9% | 1.6% | 0.0% | 0.6% | 1.0% | 16.9% |

=== Amur Oblast ===
| Date | Poll source | | | | | | | | | | Other | Undecided |
| Date | Poll source | Putin | Grudinin | Zhirinovsky | Yavlinsky | Sobchak | Titov | Baburin | Gordon | Suraykin | Other | Undecided |
|---|---|---|---|---|---|---|---|---|---|---|---|---|
| 7–9 Jan 2018 | Black Cube | 63.0% | 11.0% | 11.5% | 1.1% | 2.0% | 1.0% | 1.0% | 0.5% | 0.7% | 1.1% | 7.1% |

=== Yakutia ===
| Date | Poll source | | | | | | | | | | Other | Undecided |
| Date | Poll source | Putin | Grudinin | Zhirinovsky | Yavlinsky | Sobchak | Titov | Baburin | Gordon | Suraykin | Other | Undecided |
|---|---|---|---|---|---|---|---|---|---|---|---|---|
| 7–9 Jan 2018 | Black Cube | 69.8% | 5.1% | 8.0% | 1.5% | 0.5% | 0.8% | 0.3% | 0.0% | 0.9% | 1.6% | 11.5% |

=== Khabarovsk Krai ===
| Date | Poll source | | | | | | | | | | Other | Undecided |
| Date | Poll source | Putin | Grudinin | Zhirinovsky | Yavlinsky | Sobchak | Titov | Baburin | Gordon | Suraykin | Other | Undecided |
|---|---|---|---|---|---|---|---|---|---|---|---|---|
| 7–9 Jan 2018 | Black Cube | 56.2% | 8.9% | 12.0% | 2.0% | 0.8% | 1.5% | 0.1% | 0.4% | 0.5% | 1.8% | 15.8% |

=== Primorsky Krai ===
| Date | Poll source | | | | | | | | | | Other | Undecided |
| Date | Poll source | Putin | Grudinin | Zhirinovsky | Yavlinsky | Sobchak | Titov | Baburin | Gordon | Suraykin | Other | Undecided |
|---|---|---|---|---|---|---|---|---|---|---|---|---|
| 7–9 Jan 2018 | Black Cube | 58.0% | 12.2% | 12.8% | 1.3% | 0.9% | 1.6% | 0.1% | 0.0% | 0.7% | 2.7% | 8.7% |

== Impact of 2017 protests ==
On March 26, 2017, protests against alleged corruption in the federal Russian government took place simultaneously in many cities across the country. They were triggered by the lack of proper response from the Russian authorities to the published investigative film He Is Not Dimon To You by Alexei Navalny, which has garnered more than 20 million views on YouTube. The Levada Center survey showed that 38% of surveyed Russians supported protests and that 67 percent held Putin personally responsible for high-level corruption. A new wave of mass protests has been announced for June 12, 2017.

The Levada Center also conducted another survey, which was released on the April 6, 2017, showing Navalny's recognition among the Russian population at 55%. Out of all voters, 2% would "definitely" and 7% "perhaps" vote for him in the presidential election.
