= Party of New Type =

Party of New Type (PNT) is a voluntary public association in Russia, formed on an informal basis of a common world outlook. It is not an officially registered party. S.Sulakshin is Chairman of the Party and one of the self-nominated candidates in the 2018 Russian presidential election.

== History of creation ==
In the scientific circulation the term "party of new type" was entered into by Vladmir Lenin. In 2015, the General Director of the Center for Political Thought and Ideology, Stepan Sulakshin, announced the idea of creating PNT as opposition to Vladimir Putin's governance. The following year, he made a declaration of intent to create a "party of new type." Russian Prime Minister Dmitry Medvedev also used the phrase, in reference to the United Russia party: "The past election campaign marked the beginning of the most important stage for our Party - the formation of a new type of party." It is likely that the formulation was included in the speech of the prime minister by the efforts of the speechwriters.

The founding congress of PNT was held on June 17, 2017. At the congress it was decided to create a party as a public association without registration.

== Ideology ==
Sulakshin S. refused to call the party's agenda left-patriotic, explaining that it "has a universal program aimed at all citizens." PNT stands on the balanced political platform of a "solidary society" in which revolutions and expropriations will never again occur, but will be based on "work, justice and freedom."
