= Union of Russian Citizens =

Ethnic organization based in Estonia

Union of Russian Citizens (Estonian: Vene Kodanike Liit) is an organisation involved in protecting rights of russophone population in Estonia. The former chairman was Juri Mišin.
