= Alexander Donskoy =

Russian mayor

- Александр Донской

6th Mayor of Arkhangelsk
- In office 28 March 2005 – 19 July 2007
- Preceded by: Oleg Nilov
- Succeeded by: Viktor Pavlenko

Personal details
- Born: 10 June 1970 (age 56) Arkhangelsk, RSFSR, Soviet Union
- Spouse: Marina Viktorovna Donskaya (divorced)
- Children: Alexander and Evita

Alexander Victorovich Donskoy (Russian: Александр Викторович Донской) is a businessman and former mayor of the Northern Russian city of Arkhangelsk. He was the first prominent Russian politician to announce intentions to run in the 2008 Russian presidential election. He was later arrested in July 2007 on charges of economic crimes and abuse of power. He received a three year suspended sentence and two years of probation on March 6, 2008, four days after the conclusion of the 2008 election.

== Business career ==
Donskoy began his career as an entrepreneur, specifically focusing on supermarkets. In 2006, Donskoy raised money to buy out buildings constructed by a Romani group and reached an agreement with baron Holupy Gomon to move the group out.

== Political career ==
Donskoy ran for mayor of Arhangelsk in 2005 as an independent candidate against the United Russia candidate Pyotr Orlov. In the election, Donskoy beat Orlov and was elected as mayor of Arhangelsk in March 2005, becoming the youngest mayor of the city to date.

=== 2008 presidential campaign ===
Donskoy's announcement on 1 November 2006 of his intention to run for the presidency of Russia was followed and allegedly anticipated by official pressure. He became the subject of a criminal investigation toward the end of 2006 and, in early 2007, was accused of abuse of power and of forging his university diploma. Following his arrest, he was initially released, but was then re-arrested in July 2007. The charges against Donskoy included an allegation that he had misappropriated roughly 4 million rubles in order to pay for security for himself and his family. Donskoy was found guilty on all counts, but was handed a suspended three year sentence and a two year probation rather than the three year prison sentence that the prosecution had sought. Despite this, the Oktyabrsky District Court ruled that Donskoy would no longer be eligible to serve in any public office, elected or otherwise. Following the ruling, Donskoy's lawyers announced that they would seek an acquittal and were willing to take the case to the European Court in Strasbourg, but neither ever occurred.

=== 2011 Russian legislative election ===
Donskoy served as the head of Yabloko's regional group for Arkhangelsk and Kaliningrad during the 2011 Russian legislative election. On 11 October 2011, Donskoy revealed that Yabloko Chairman Sergey Mitrokhin had asked him not to stand as a State Duma candidate for Yabloko. On 24 October, Donskoy was officially barred from the Yabloko party list.

=== 2018 presidential campaign ===
On 24 October 2017, Donskoy announced that he would run for President in the 2018 Russian presidential election. However, he never submitted the necessary registration documents to the Central Election Commission and therefore was never an official candidate. Based on the official election results published by the CEC, Donskoy either received no votes or votes for him were marked as invalid.

== Personal life ==
Donskoy came out as gay on 24 October 2017. In response to a journalist's question about whether or not he was gay, he said yes. Later, Donskoy confirmed that this was an official statement.

In 2017, Donskoy took his Ferrari and used it to speed through the halls of a mall in Moscow. Nobody was injured, but it took security officers several minutes to stop the car, allowing it to leave several tire tracks along the floor of the mall. Donskoy claimed that it had all been for fun and was a joke for publicity.

On 22 November 2020, Donskoy's son Alexander died after contracting malaria.

=== Popular culture ===
On 2 January 2019, a video was uploaded to YouTube of Donskoy racing around the mall in Moscow set to the tune of Coconut Mall from the Mario Kart series. It went viral and has amassed over 2.2 million views.
