= Pavel Grudinin =

Russian politician (born 1960)

- Павел Грудинин
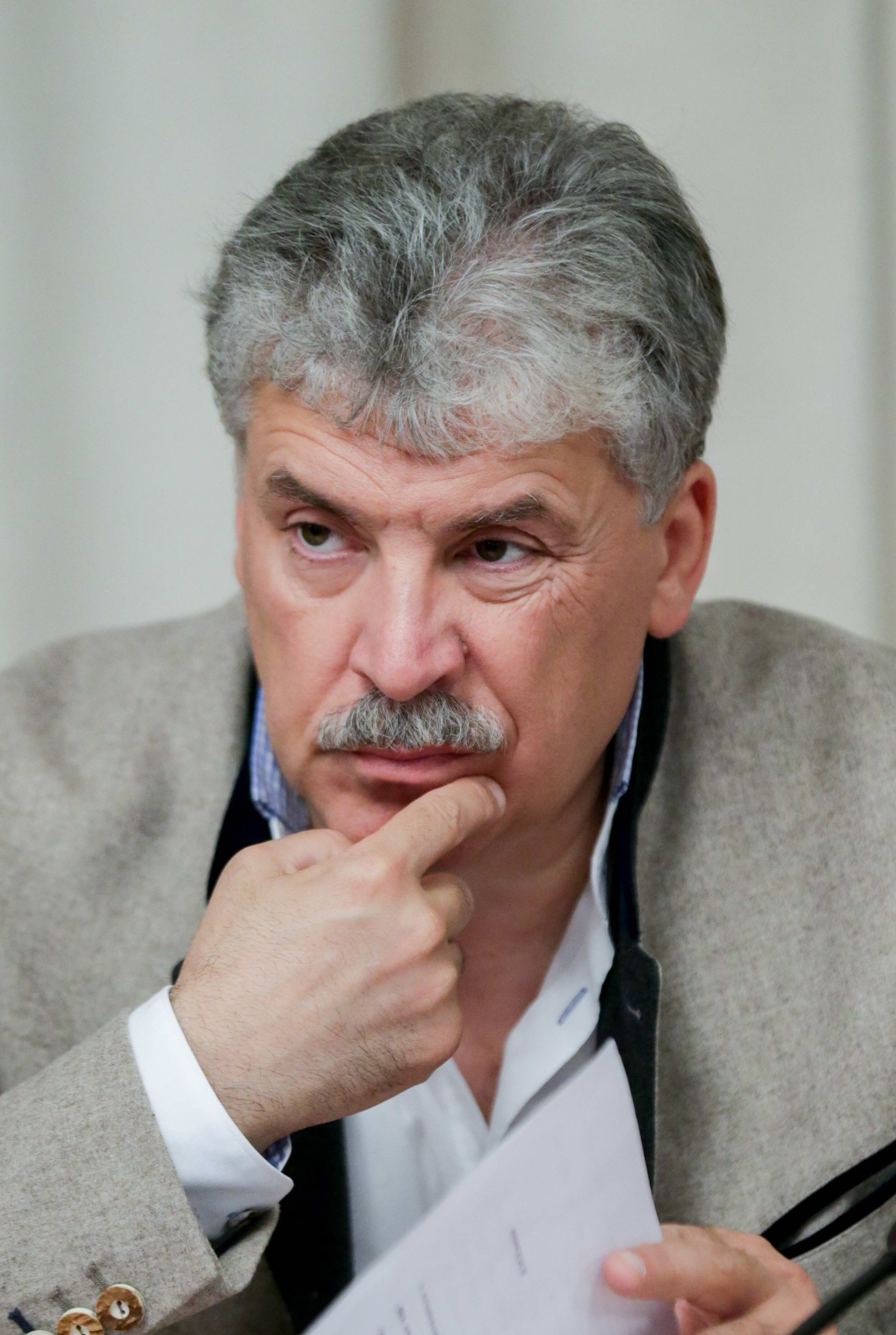
- Grudinin in 2018

Member of the Moscow Oblast Duma
- In office 14 December 1997 – 15 October 2011

Personal details
- Born: Pavel Nikolayevich Grudinin; 20 October 1960 (age 65) Moscow, Russian SFSR, Soviet Union
- Party: Independent
- Other political affiliations: Unity (1999–2001); United Russia (2007–2010); Communist Party (alliance in the 2018 election)
- Spouse: Irina Igorevna Grudinina (div. 2018)
- Children: 4
- Education: Moscow State Agroengineering University
- Occupation: Politician; Businessman

Pavel Nikolayevich Grudinin (Russian: Павел Николаевич Грудинин; born 20 October 1960) is a Russian politician and businessman. He served as a municipal deputy of the urban settlement of Vidnoye from 1997 to 2011 and later as chairman of the Council of Deputies from 2017 to 2019.

Grudinin was the Communist Party of the Russian Federation (KPRF) candidate in the 2018 Russian presidential election, held on 18 March. He placed second with 11.77% of the vote, losing to incumbent president Vladimir Putin, who secured re-election with 76.7%.

== Early life and family ==
Grudinin was born in Moscow on 20 October 1960 to Nikolai Konstantinovich Grudinin and Serafima Zinovievna Grudinina (née Pishchik), both agricultural workers. His parents met while studying at the Moscow Timiryazev Agricultural Academy and were assigned in 1961 to work at the Lenin Sovkhoz in Leninsky District, Moscow Oblast. Grudinin claimed that his extended family, including his sister, grandmother, son, aunts, uncles, and cousins, all worked at the same sovkhoz in various roles, forming a "dynasty" that collectively contributed "over 250 years of work" there.

His paternal grandparents originated from Vologda Governorate, with his father born in Gryazovetsky District and raised in Vologda. His maternal grandfather was Jewish, from Volgograd Oblast, and later moved to Leningrad, where he married an ethnic Russian woman. He served as a tank commander during World War II (referred to in Russia as the Great Patriotic War) and was declared missing in action in 1944. Grudinin identifies ethnically as Russian and adheres to Russian Orthodoxy, though he has criticized the Russian Orthodox Church (ROC) for its "interference in temporal affairs".

=== Education and career ===
After graduating from school in 1977, Grudinin enrolled at the Moscow State Agroengineering University, earning a degree in mechanical engineering in 1982. He then began working at the Lenin Sovkhoz, where his family had long been employed. From 1982 to 1989, he served as head of the mechanical workshop, followed by a role as deputy director from 1990 to 1995. In 1995, he became general director of the newly privatized ZAO "Lenin State Farm" (a closed joint-stock company), acquiring a blocking stake in the enterprise.

Grudinin has described the farm as a "socialist enterprise" focused on producing dairy, fruits, and vegetables. Under his leadership, the farm expanded its community services, providing residents with access to healthcare, education, and other social programs.

== Political career ==
Grudinin was elected three times as a deputy of the Moscow Oblast Duma, serving from 1997 to 2011. In 2001, he earned a degree in jurisprudence from the Russian Academy of Public Administration under the President of the Russian Federation.

In 2017, he became a municipal deputy of the urban settlement of Vidnoye. On 9 October 2017, he was elected speaker of the Council of Deputies but was removed from the role on 14 February 2019. Twelve days later, on 26 February 2019, the council dismissed him from his position as deputy entirely.

Following the death of Zhores Alferov, a Communist Party of the Russian Federation (CPRF) member in the State Duma, the CPRF nominated Grudinin to fill the vacant seat on 14 March 2019. However, the Central Election Commission (CEC) blocked his appointment on 21 March, citing undisclosed foreign financial accounts. The CPRF condemned the decision, and nationwide protests organized by Communist supporters on 23 March included demands for Grudinin's reinstatement.

On 24 July 2021, the CEC barred Grudinin from participating in the 2021 Russian legislative election, alleging he owned shares in a Belize-registered company—a violation of Russian electoral laws prohibiting parliamentary candidates from holding offshore assets. Grudinin denied the accusations, stating, "The [Communist] Party is an opposition party... Someone is afraid of the impact a coalition of left-wing forces could achieve." CPRF leader Gennady Zyuganov pledged to appeal the decision to the Supreme Court.

=== 2018 presidential campaign ===
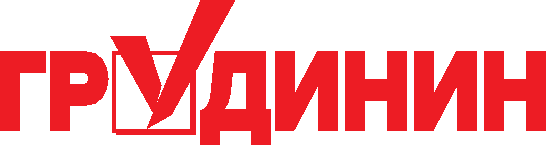
2018 Presidential campaign logo

On 23 December 2017, at the XVII Congress of the Communist Party of the Russian Federation (CPRF), Pavel Grudinin was nominated as the party's presidential candidate. CPRF leader Gennady Zyuganov was appointed to head his campaign headquarters.

Grudinin's nomination drew criticism from prominent left-wing figures, including Sergey Mironov (A Just Russia), Maxim Suraykin (Communists of Russia), and political analyst Boris Kagarlitsky. Critics argued that his background as a businessman and former member of United Russia (2001–2010) conflicted with communist ideology opposing the "bourgeois class." Controversy intensified after reports revealed undisclosed foreign bank accounts linked to Grudinin, which he attributed to "technical errors" in financial disclosures.

During the campaign, Grudinin visited 11 federal subjects alongside his home region of Moscow Oblast, holding rallies, press conferences, and tours of local enterprises to emphasize economic and social welfare platforms.

In the election held on 18 March 2018, Grudinin placed second with 11.8% of the vote, behind incumbent president Vladimir Putin, who secured re-election with 76.7%.

=== 2024 presidential candidacy ===
On 14 November 2019, Grudinin announced his intention to run for president in the 2024 Russian presidential election. As part of his platform, he pledged to dissolve the State Duma, hold snap parliamentary elections, and nationalize assets obtained through illegal means.

Grudinin stated he would seek the nomination of the Communist Party of the Russian Federation (CPRF). However, he added that if the party selected another candidate, he would support their bid instead.

== Personal life ==
Grudinin was married and has two adult sons from the marriage.

On 16 July 2018, he divorced his wife, Irina, via court proceedings. Reports cited Grudinin's adultery as the grounds for divorce, alleging he had concealed a long-term extramarital relationship and maintained a second family. Grudinin was reportedly in a relationship with Ksenia Kutyukhina, with whom he has two daughters born in 2012 and 2014.

== Electoral history ==
=== 2018 presidential election ===
Results of Pavel Grudinin by federal subjects

Candidates	Party	Votes	%
Vladimir Putin	Independent	56,430,712	76.69
Pavel Grudinin	Communist Party	8,659,206	11.77
Vladimir Zhirinovsky	Liberal Democratic Party	4,154,985	5.65
Ksenia Sobchak	Civic Initiative	1,238,031	1.68
Grigory Yavlinsky	Yabloko	769,644	1.05
Boris Titov	Party of Growth	556,801	0.76
Maxim Suraykin	Communists of Russia	499,342	0.68
Sergey Baburin	Russian All-People's Union	479,013	0.65
Source: CEC

== Awards and titles ==
Grudinin has received the following honors:

- Medal "In Commemoration of the 850th Anniversary of Moscow"
- Letter of Gratitude from the President of the Russian Federation
- Honorary Diploma of the State Duma
- The title Honored Worker of Agriculture of the Russian Federation

Preceded by Gennady Zyuganov	Communist Party presidential candidate 2018	Succeeded by Nikolay Kharitonov
