= Right Cause =

Right Cause Правое дело
- Abbreviation: PD (English); ПД (Russian)
- Leader: Boris Titov (last)
- Founders: Georgy Bovt; Leonid Gozman; Boris Titov
- Founded: 16 November 2008
- Registered: 11 February 2009
- Dissolved: 26 March 2016
- Merger of: Union of Right Forces; Democratic Party of Russia; Civilian Power
- Succeeded by: Party of Growth
- Headquarters: 7/6th Building, Vozdvizhenka Street, Moscow, Russia. 119019
- Membership (2016): 16,000
- Ideology: Liberal conservatism Conservative liberalism Economic liberalism Pro-Europeanism; 2012–2016: National democracy National patriotism
- Political position: Centre-right; 2012–2016: Centre-right to right-wing
- National affiliation: All-Russia People's Front (2016)
- Colours: Gold; Black
- Slogan: Our cause is right, the victory will be ours! (Russian: Наше дело - правое, победа будет за нами!)

Website
- pravoedelo.ru

Right Cause (PD), officially the All-Russian Political Party "Right Cause", (Note: Russian: Всероссийская политическая партия «Правое дело» (ПД), romanized: Vserossiyskaya politicheskaya partiya "Pravoye delo" (PD)) was an officially registered centre-right Russian political party that existed from 2008 to 2016. It was created from the merger of three parties: Civilian Power, the Democratic Party of Russia (DPR), and the Union of Right Forces, and it declared itself liberal.

On 26 March 2016, it was renamed to Party of Growth under the chairmanship of Boris Titov.

After this reorganization and name change by the former chairman of the party Vyacheslav Maratkanov, the public movement "Right Cause" was created.

== History ==
=== Formation ===
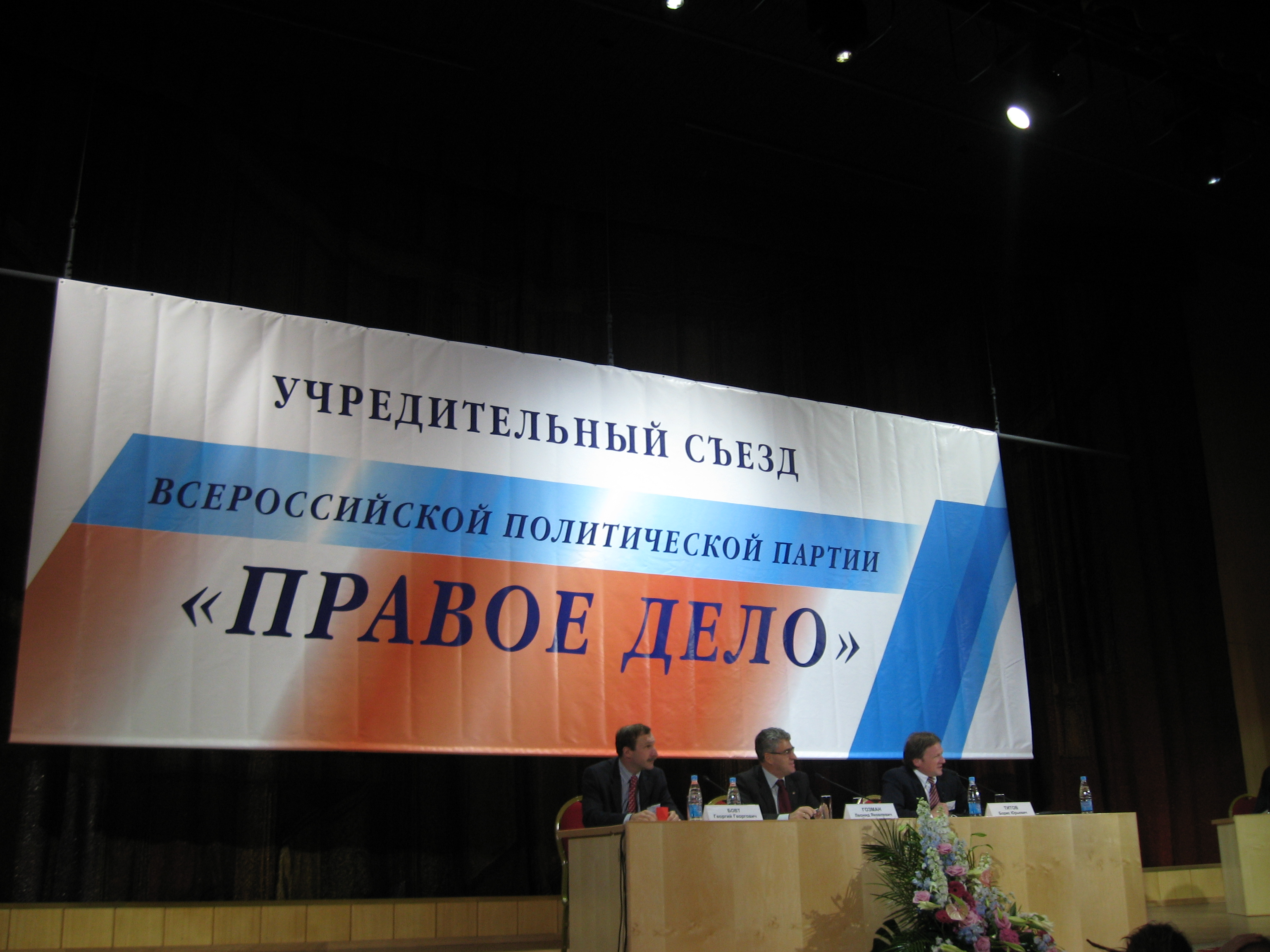
Founding Congress of the Right Cause political party, from left to right: Georgy Bovt, Leonid Gozman, Boris Titov. November 16, 2008

Logo of the party "Right Cause" November 2008–June 2011

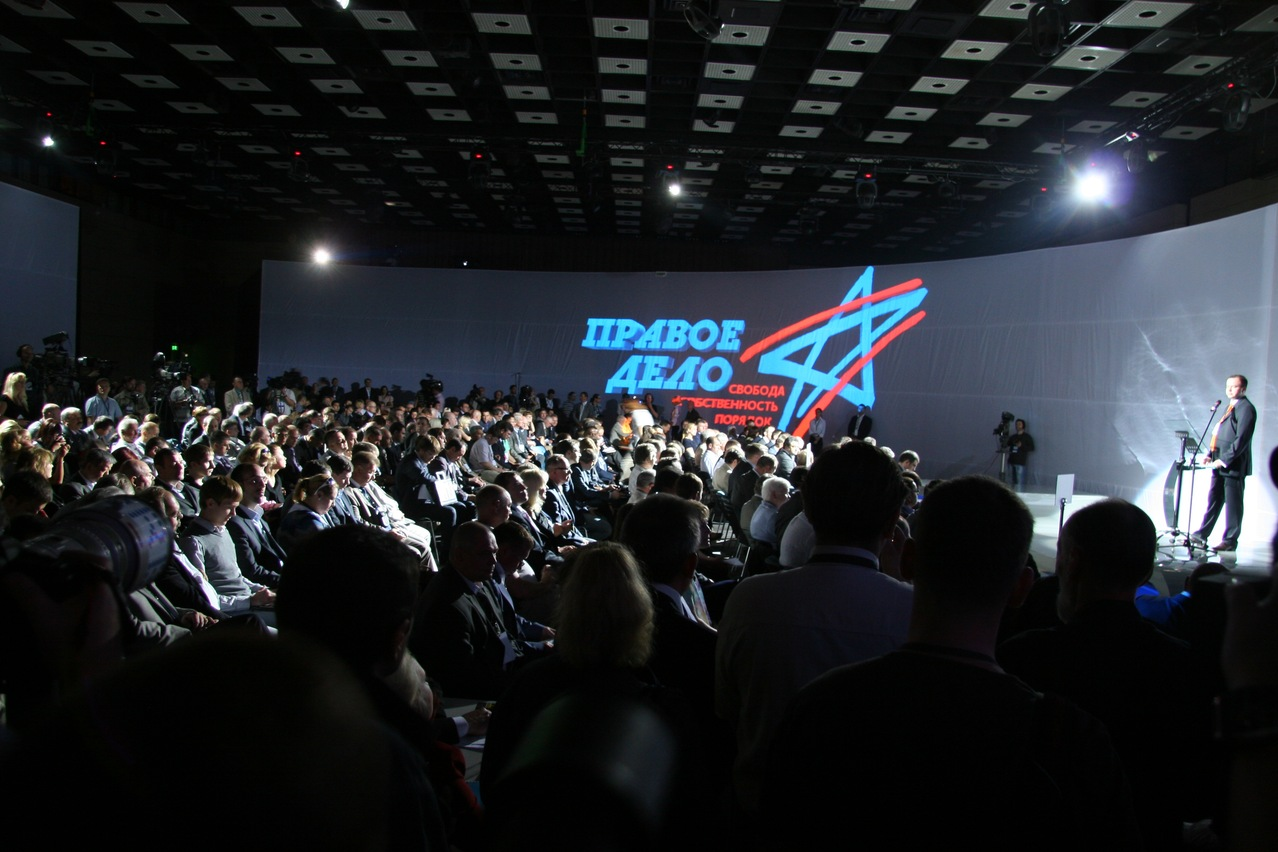
Election of Party Chairman Mikhail Prokhorov on June 25, 2011

The Right Cause party emerged on 16 November 2008, as a result of the unification of three right-liberal parties: the Democratic Party of Russia, Civilian Power, and the Union of Right Forces. On 11 February 2009, the party was officially registered by the Ministry of Justice of the Russian Federation, becoming the only registered political force over the period from 2006 to 2011. The media explained this situation by the fact that the project was approved by the Kremlin.

On 16 November 2008, at the party's founding congress, 33 people were elected to the first composition of the party's federal political council, including:

- Georgy Bovt, journalist
- Leonid Gozman, leader of the Union of Right Forces
- Boris Titov, head of Delovaya Rossiya (Business Russia)
- Valery Akhadov, film director
- Andrey Dunaev, lawyer
- Boris Nadezhdin, former deputy of the State Duma
- Andrey Nechayev, former Russian Economy Minister
- Grigory Tomchin, president of the Fund for Legislative Initiatives

Evgeny Chichvarkin was elected chairman of the Moscow branch. He was also made responsible for the branding of the party. The party was co-chaired by representatives of its three founding parties: Titov from Civilian Power, Bovt from the DPR, and Gozman from the Union of Right Forces. The central office was headed by Andrey Dunaev, an employee of the Presidential Administration of the Russian Federation. Later, they disagreed on the purpose of the party and its relationship with the authorities.

On 1 March 2009, the party took part in municipal elections for the first time. The party did not manage to complete registration for the elections, but local candidates of the party in Tolyatti were able to take part under December, a local public movement. The movement's leader was the deputy of the Samara Regional Duma, and a member of the regional political council of Right Cause. Sergey Andreev took second place in the elections with 26% of the vote, losing only to United Russia with 39.5%, and passing 5 deputies on the movement's party list.

=== Activities of Mikhail Prokhorov ===
On 26 June 2011, at an extraordinary party congress, billionaire Mikhail Prokhorov was elected its chairman, and new symbols and images for the party were approved. He had received an offer to join on April 25, which he accepted on 16 May. The new head received the right to single-handedly decide key personnel issues, including the rights to approve the lists of candidates for deputies in the elections, to admit new members to the party, and to expel those who had been fined. The minimum goal was a faction in the State Duma following the December 2011 elections, and the maximum goal was to become the second "party of power", and eventually the first. According to The New Times, Prokhorov intended to spend $100 million in personal funds on the party's election campaign, and hoped to receive the same amount from his colleagues in the business community.

In July 2011, Prokhorov invited Yevgeny Roizman, founder of the City Without Drugs Foundation and deputy of the State Duma of the fourth convocation, to the party. Prokhorov suggested that he run in the State Duma elections on the federal party list, so that if successful he would be able to engage in the formation of state anti-drug and anti-alcohol policies and legislation. The decision to admit Roizman to the ranks of party leadership caused dissatisfaction within the party's regional branches due to his conviction in 1981 for theft, fraud and illegal possession of weapons. Prokhorov instructed Rifat Shaykhutdinov, a deputy from the Liberal Democratic Party (LDPR), to head the party's campaign headquarters. In August 2011, Alexander Lyubimov, a well-known journalist and author of the Vzglyad TV program, also joined the party.

On 3 August 2011, the Izvestia newspaper published an interview with the head of the Moscow Region branch of the party, Boris Nadezhdin, who called for cooperation with nationalists and, in particular, admitted that "officers and young skinheads" were entering the branch en masse. Nadezhdin also put forward the slogan "Podmoskovye is Russian land", after which Prokhorov invited Nadezhdin to leave the party if he shared the views of nationalists. Prokhorov wrote in his blog that "if this is his personal conscious position, then he has no place in the party."

In August 2011, political analyst Alexei Makarkin expressed the opinion that the Right Cause election campaign would be very problematic, since Prokhorov lacked both political and party-building experience. Makarkin noted that dissatisfaction with Prokhorov was growing in the regional branches of the party, which he explained by the fact that "they hoped that a new leader, a billionaire, with big money would come, a golden rain would be shed on them," but then it turned out that "it would be far from for all".

==== Confrontation and resignation of Prokhorov ====
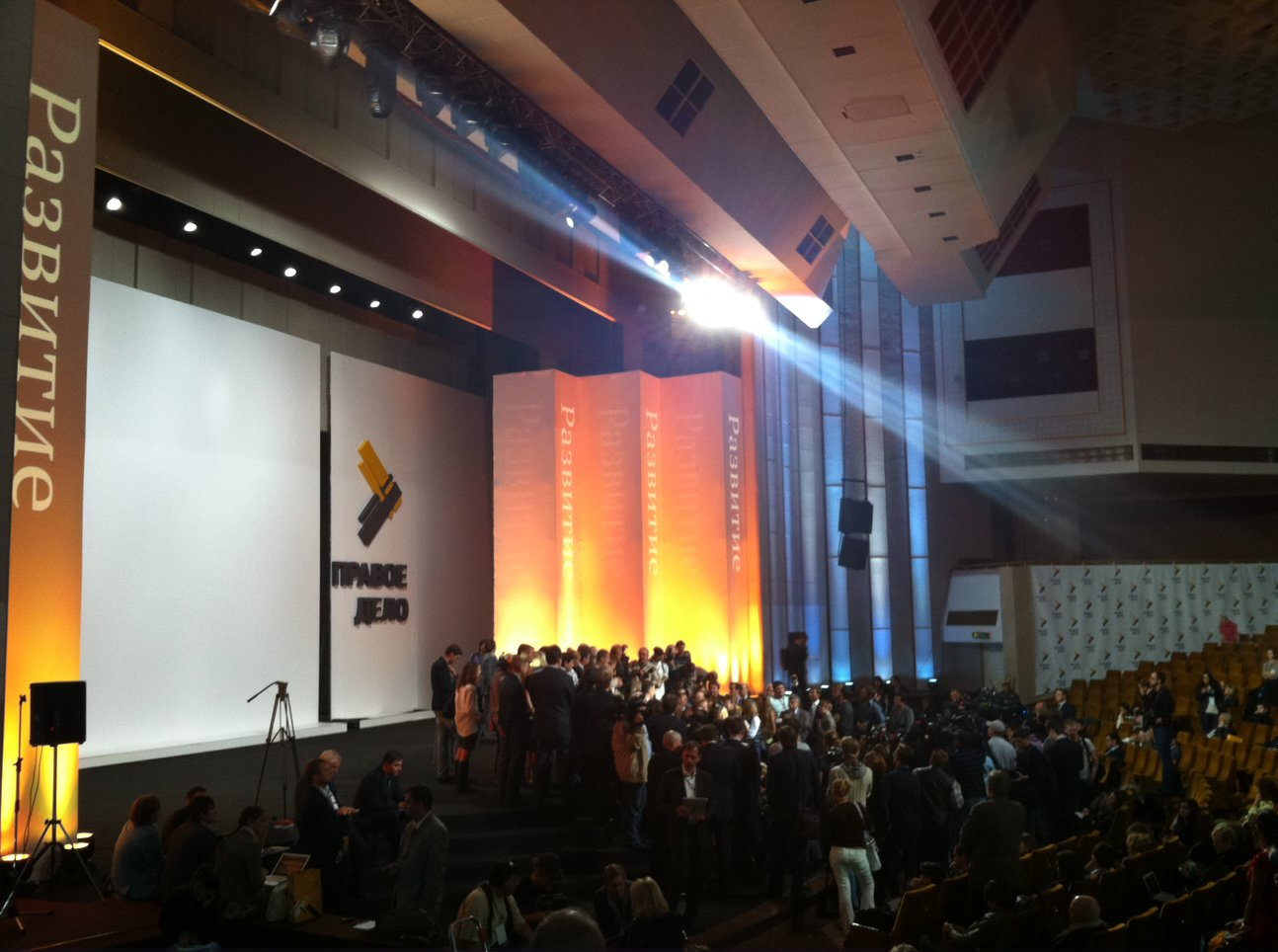
Party congress chaired by Mikhail Prokhorov, after rebranding. September 14, 2011

External videos
- Interview with Boris Nadezhdin about Prokhorov and Right Cause on YouTube

External videos
- Interview with Andrey Dunaev on YouTube

On 20 June 2011, during the St. Petersburg regional conference (which some of the participants did not recognize as legal), the head of the regional office was changed. Instead of Sergei Tsybukov, Maxim Dolgopolov was elected; he had previously been detained in Dubai on suspicion of the murder of Sulim Yamadayev, but was later released. Party leader Mikhail Prokhorov decided to expel all 1,334 members of the St. Petersburg regional branch from the party and simultaneously admit 220 Petersburgers to the party. On 5 August 2011, the new members elected Evgeny Mauter, recommended by Prokhorov, as the chairman of the regional branch. Dolgopolov's supporters filed a lawsuit in the Basmanny Court of Moscow.

Even before the party congress, scheduled for September 14–15 at the World Trade Center in Moscow, information appeared in the press about the regional branches' dissatisfaction with Prokhorov's activities as party leader. The former head of the Altai branch Pavel Chesnov told Nezavisimaya Gazeta on 13 September that the congress could raise the issue of changing the party charter and removing Prokhorov, who could be replaced by Georgy Bovt, Andrey Dunaev or Nikita Belykh.

On 14 September, on the first day of the congress, opponents of Prokhorov received the majority of seats on the credentials committee. At an urgently convened briefing that evening, Prokhorov announced the termination of the powers of the executive committee, headed by Andrey Dunaev. Prokhorov also expelled Andrei Bogdanov and the Ryavkin brothers from the party, with the reason "for causing political damage to the party", and accused Radiy Khabirov, congress participant and deputy head of the internal policy department of the Presidential Administration of Russia, of attempting to "raid the party".

On the morning of 15 September, in a broadcast of the Echo of Moscow radio station, Prokhorov called on his supporters to leave the party, and noted that he intends to create a new party. He did not announce his withdrawal from the party at the time of the broadcast, but noted that "he is already signing a statement of other members". Opponents of Prokhorov in turn announced that at least 65–68 of 70 regional delegates were present at the congress, and the question of Prokhorov's resignation might be raised.

On the morning of 15 September, Dunaev, whom Prokhorov removed from the post of head of the executive committee the day before, announced at the congress: "Information has come through the media that Prokhorov is creating his own party. I propose to immediately vote for the removal of Prokhorov from the post of party leader". Congress participants supported Dunaev and removed Prokhorov from his post. Dunaev himself was elected acting head of the party. The reason for the displacement of Prokhorov was the conflict with the party's regional branches, as well as the decision to include Yevgeny Roizman in the electoral list. Prokhorov was not present at this congress, but took part in an alternative congress held in parallel at the Russian Academy of Sciences. At that congress, the "actual takeover of the party" and alleged falsifications of the credentials committee were announced, which according to Prokhorov "was planned and carried out by employees of the Presidential Administration, subordinates of Surkov." Prokhorov said that he could no longer be associated with the party, which was "led by puppeteers", and called on his supporters to leave it. He declared Surkov to be the main culprit of the "raider takeover". Alexander Lyubimov and Alla Pugacheva spoke in support of Prokhorov at the meeting.

On 15 September 2011, Prokhorov was dismissed as party chairman by the decision of the party congress chaired by the head of the central office Andrey Dunaev, with chairman of the credentials commission Andrei Bogdanov appointing Dunaev as acting chairman.

=== Participation in the 2011 elections and further political activities ===
The program with which the party took part in the 2011 parliamentary election was adopted at the congress on 20 September. The party called for the Russia's immediate filing of an application for membership in the European Union, for "curbing the arbitrariness of officials and security forces", and for the abolition of parliamentary immunity. The party proposed disbanding the Federal Protective Service of the Russian Federation so that "officials feel like residents of their country." According to party leader Andrey Dunaev, "there are too many law enforcement agencies with duplicate functions in the country and, for example, some private agency could protect the top officials of the state". The party advocated for the restoration of universal election of power, including the election of city mayors, governors and heads of constituent entities of the Russian Federation, and proposed a ban on holding elected office more than twice in a lifetime.

According to party leader and main author of the party program, Vladislav Inozemtsev, the party "stands for the most complete freedom of all citizens' initiatives permitted by law, political, economic, social and cultural." Inozemtsev sees the future of Russia "on the path of overcoming ignorance, dogmatism and obscurantism". Inozemtsev sees the first step on this path as "the restoration of the secular nature" of the Russian government. According to Inozemtsev, "the time has come to object to the planting of primitive religiosity in a predominantly atheistic country, which has now become a large-scale business project. Priests have no place in schools, the army, or government agencies. Ships and airplanes should float and fly because they were assembled by skilled workers, not because they were sprinkled with holy water by owners of watches costing tens of thousands of dollars. Religion should become a private matter of citizens."

The party also advocated for a gradual increase in the retirement age and the legalization of short-barreled weapons.

In 2011, in parliamentary elections to the State Duma, the top three on the party's federal list of candidates were Andrey Dunaev, Andrei Bogdanov and tennis player Anna Chakvetadze. Also in the top ten of the list were Vladislav Inozemtsev and Alexander Brod. Boris Nadezhdin, a member of the party's federal political council, refused to be in the top three of the federal list, but headed the party list for the Moscow Regional Duma election. The party took last place in the federal elections on December 4, receiving 392,507 votes (0.6% of the total) and was unable to get a single representative on the Duma.

In 2012, the party supported Vladimir Putin in the presidential elections.

On 23 March 2012, the State Duma adopted amendments to the Federal Law FZ-95 On Political Parties, simplifying the registration of political parties. After that, some former members of Right Cause left it and established their own. Mikhail Prokhorov created and registered Civic Platform, and his supporters joined the party. Members Alexander Ryavkin and Vladislav Inozemtsev, who had left the party after it supported Putin in the presidential elections, revived the Civilian Power party. Andrey Nechayev organized and led his own opposition party, Civic Initiative, and Andrei Bogdanov revived and led the Democratic Party of Russia.

In August 2012, Ivan Okhlobystin was invited to the party to develop a new ideology. On 5 October of that year, due to a resolution of the Holy Synod prohibiting priests from being members of political parties, he left the party, saying that he remained only its spiritual mentor. On 3 November 2012, Andrey Dunaev said that the party had abandoned its previous course and intended to continue to pursue right-wing policy with a "national-patriotic bias".

On 18 December 2012, Dunaev left the post of party chairman, and Vyacheslav Maratkanov, who had been deputy chairman for the past three years, was appointed acting chairman.

On a single day of voting, the party sent two of its party deputies in single-mandate districts to the City Duma of Syzran. In the city of Tolyatti, it nominated three candidates, one of whom was go-go dancer Kristina Kazakova, which led to increased and scandalous interest from the local media. However, this did not help the party overcome the electoral barrier.

=== Renaming ===
With the return of Boris Titov to the party, a fundamental reform was carried out, the composition of the political council was changed, and the party returned to liberal values and was later renamed the Party of Growth.

In January 2016, Titov, at that time head of the industrial committee of the All-Russia People's Front, announced his readiness for the parliamentary elections in the fall of 2016 to head the list of the party that would defend the interests of medium and small business. He had conversations with several parties: Civilian Power, Civic Platform, The Greens, Rodina and Right Cause, and chose the latter. He considered the party a "tool" for participating in elections without collecting signatures (14 parties had direct ballot access at the time), partly due to the presence of party members in the people's assemblies of Dagestan and Ingushetia. He said success in the election would be overcoming the five percent entry barrier and forming a faction in the State Duma.

About 25 regional divisions of the party opposed the return of Titov, and regarded this as a surrender by the leadership "to a raider takeover". Among the new delegates to the congress were former and current members of United Russia, Delovaya Rossiya and the All-Russia People's Front.

On 29 February 2016, Titov was elected chairman of the party at its 7th Congress. He was supported by 70 delegates with none voting against him. Several businesspeople announced their readiness to join the federal council, including managing partner of the Management Development Group Dmitry Potapenko, Alfa-Bank vice president Vladimir Senin, Internet Ombudsman and member of the Russian General Council of Business Dmitry Marinichev, member of the Civic Chamber and Public Commissioner for the protection of small and medium business rights Viktor Ermakov, and a member of the Presidium of the General Council of "Business Russia" Mikhail Rosenfeld.

A number of media outlets and political scientists called the arrival of Titov coordinated with the Presidential Administration, with, for example, candidates for the presidium and political council being coordinated. Titov admitted that the project of the updated party is connected with the Administration, and that he is supervised by the Administration's First Deputy Chief of Staff, Vyacheslav Volodin.

Titov stated that his party is going to cooperate with the current government and its supporting forces for changes in the country. He criticized the leadership of the Central Bank of Russia and the work of the economic and financial bloc of the government of Dmitry Medvedev (while simultaneously criticizing and defending the Platon system introduced by federal authorities), and supported the government's foreign policy, in particular the annexation of Crimea in 2014.

Readiness to cooperate with the party was also announced by a group of deputies who left A Just Russia (Oksana Dmitriyeva, her husband Ivan Grachev, and Natalya Petukhova), two deputies of United Russia – Elena Nikolaeva and Viktor Zvagelsky, and a former State Duma deputy and leader of the Russian Motorists Movement Viktor Pokhmelkin. However they did not join the party, only intending to run in elections on its lists. Subsequently, Titov and his deputy Tatyana Marchenko announced that they were joining the General Council of the party, along with UC Rusal President Oleg Deripaska, former Wimm-Bill-Dann shareholder David Yakobashvili, former Svyaznoy owner Maxim Nogotkov, Geotek co-owner Nikolay Levitsky, Rostik Group President Rostislav Ordovsky-Tanaevsky Blanco, and the son of Boris Titov, Chairman of the Board of Directors of Abrau-Durso Pavel Titov. Later, a number of the aforementioned people including Deripaska denied participation in the political project.

At the party congress on 26 March, its name was changed to "Party of Growth" due to negative associations with the former name. The party's program was the document "The Economics of Growth", created by Titov together with adviser to President Vladimir Putin, Sergey Glazyev. It proposes to "reduce the key rate to 5.5%", "begin monetization of the economy and at least double the money supply", and make the court independent of the authorities. Party leadership named the Communist Party of the Russian Federation, Yabloko, Civic Platform and PARNAS as their competitors.

== Electoral results ==
=== Presidential elections ===
Election	Candidate	First round		Second round		Result
Election	Candidate	Votes	%	Votes	%	Result
2012	Endorsed Mikhail Prokhorov	5,722,508	7.98%			Lost ✗

=== Legislative elections ===
Election	Party leader	Performance					Rank	Government
Election	Party leader	Votes	%	± pp	Seats	+/–	Rank	Government
2011	Andrey Dunaev	392,806	0.60%	▼1.63 (Note: Regarding the combined results of the Union of Right Forces, Civilian Power and Democratic Party of Russia)	0 / 450	0	7th	Extra-parliamentary

=== Local elections ===
In 2011, the party received one mandate in the People's Assembly of the Republic of Dagestan and one mandate in the People's Assembly of the Republic of Ingushetia according to the party list.

In 2013, the party received one mandate from its list to the City Duma of Syzran, one mandate in a single-mandate constituency, and two mandates in Elektrogorsk.

== Ideology ==
- Liberal conservatism, conservative liberalism (until November 2012)
- National democracy (November 2012 – February 2016)

=== National-patriotic orientation ===
At the party's congress on 24 February 2012, the leader of the Right to Bear Arms social movement, Maria Butina spoke, becoming an ally of the party.

On 14 August 2012, Ivan Okhlobystin was invited to the post of Chairman of the Supreme Council of the party. On 21 August, a press conference of the party leadership was held at Interfax, at which Okhlobystin was represented. Some saw him as a possible future party leader. On 5 October of that year, due to the decision of the Holy Synod prohibiting priests from being members of political parties, he left the party, saying that he remained only its spiritual mentor.

On 3 November 2012, at the party congress chaired by Andrey Dunaev, the party summed up the failed outcome of the 2011 parliamentary elections and a decision was made to change its political orientation, abandon liberal ideology, and become a right-wing party in every sense of the term, taking a course towards national patriotism.

On 26 November 2012, the party leader Dunaev raised the issue of legalizing prostitution in Russia. He said that the party intends to conduct sociological research on this issue and come up with an initiative to the parliamentary parties and a possible collection of signatures for legalization. He believes that this will officially legalize what already exists, and make it possible for sex workers to leave the patronage of criminal and near-criminal structures, as well as unscrupulous law enforcement officers, pay taxes to the state budget, undergo regular medical examinations, and claim pension contributions. He also added that sex workers in today's situation have no rights before their employers, equating them with sexual slavery. Currently prostitution is officially legalized in the EU countries of the Netherlands, Italy, Hungary, Germany. Previously, in 2007, the LDPR came up with a similar initiative, but it was postponed by the Duma. Andrei Bogdanov, former member of the party's federal council, and then-leader of the restored DPR, spoke out against the initiative of his former colleagues, saying that he and his party intended to prevent Right Cause from collecting signatures by launching a campaign against the initiative.

=== Reversal to liberal orientation ===
On 29 February 2016, at the party's 7th Congress, the business ombudsman Boris Titov was elected party chairman. He announced a change in the political course of the party to a "party of business", and its rebranding.

== Party organization ==
=== Central office ===
From 2008 to 2011, the party's central office was located in Moscow, in the building of the Civilian Power party (which became one of the founders). From 2011 to 2013, the central office was located in the former central headquarters of the Nashi movement. From 2013 to 2014, the central office was located at Bolshoi Zlatoustinsky lane, house 6. In August 2014, the central office of the party moved to Vozdvizhenka street, 7/6 building 1.

=== Leadership ===
- Boris Titov (Chairman February 29 – March 26, 2016)
- Vyacheslav Maratkanov (Acting Chairman 2012–2016)
- Andrey Dunaev (Chairman 2011–2012)
- Mikhail Prokhorov (Chairman June–September 2011)
- Leonid Gozman (Co-Chairman 2008–2011)
- Georgy Bovt (Co-Chairman 2008–2011)
- Boris Titov (Co-Chairman 2008–2011)

== Income and expenses ==
In 2009 the party relied on donations, with 22.2% income being provided by donations from individuals, and 74.8% being provided by transfers from legal entities. In 2015, the party's income was an insignificant 89,300 rubles ($1400 at the time).

== Legacy ==
=== Alexander Lyubimov's opinion on the results of the party's activities ===
They wanted to go to the Duma elections with the Right Cause party, but nothing came of it. It is obvious to me that it is not yet possible to engage in full-fledged political activity in Russia. One must either join the friendly ranks of the members of the party in power, or be prepared to have zelyonka splashed in one's face. As they say, thank you for not [using] acid. I don't like this option. It's not very comfortable to work when you constantly have to think about your own safety and wait for someone to come up from behind with bad intentions.
