= Union of Progressive Political Forces =

Union of Progressive Political Forces Союз прогрессивных политических сил
- Abbreviation: UPPF (English); SPPS (Russian)
- Leader: Alexey Nechayev; Boris Titov
- Founders: Alexey Nechayev; Boris Titov
- Founded: 27 June 2023
- Dissolved: 19 April 2024
- Ideology: Economic liberalism
- Political position: Centre to centre-right
- Coalition members: New People; Party of Growth

The Union of Progressive Political Forces (SPPS, Russian: Союз прогрессивных политических сил, romanized: Soyuz progressivnykh politicheskikh sil) was a Russian economically liberal two-party political alliance between the New People and the Party of Growth.

== History ==
=== Background ===
In May 2020, Alexander Pozhalov, Research Director of the ISEPIC Foundation, said that he did not see any electoral differences between the Party of Growth and New People, calling them both liberal.

In 2021, Moskovskaya Gazeta said that the New People party and the Party of Growth have a common electorate in the parliamentary elections, both parties will compete for a common voter. Adviser to the Governor of the Pskov Oblast Anton Sergeev admitted the possibility of merger of the Party of Growth and New People.

=== Foundation ===
On 27 June 2023, New People and the Party of Growth entered into a political alliance in order not to compete with each other in the 2023 Russian regional elections. This was announced by party leaders Alexey Nechayev and Boris Titov. The parties will set up a joint headquarters for regional elections. In particular, it is planned not to field candidates from parties in the same constituencies in the elections of the City Dumas and Legislative Assemblies. Since it is impossible to form a bloc legally without a legal merger of parties, which is not yet planned, the cooperation of the parties will be expressed in the absence of competition in the same constituencies and the support of each other's candidates.

== See also ==
- Union of Right Forces (SPS)
