= New People (Russia) =

New People Новые люди
- Chairperson: Alexey Nechayev
- Deputy Chairpersons: Alexander Davankov; Viktor Zvagelsky
- FPC Chairman: Boris Titov
- Founder: Alexey Nechayev
- Founded: 1 March 2020; 6 years ago
- Headquarters: 22nd building, Malaya Yakimanka Street; Moscow, Russia
- Ideology: Populism; Communitarianism; Liberalism (Russian); Regionalism
- Political position: Centre to centre-right
- Colours: Turquoise; Black
- Slogan: "People Matter More" (#ЛюдиВажнее)
- Seats in the Federation Council: 0 / 170
- Seats in the State Duma: 30 / 450
- Seats in the Regional Parliaments: 60 / 3,987

Website
- newpeople.ru

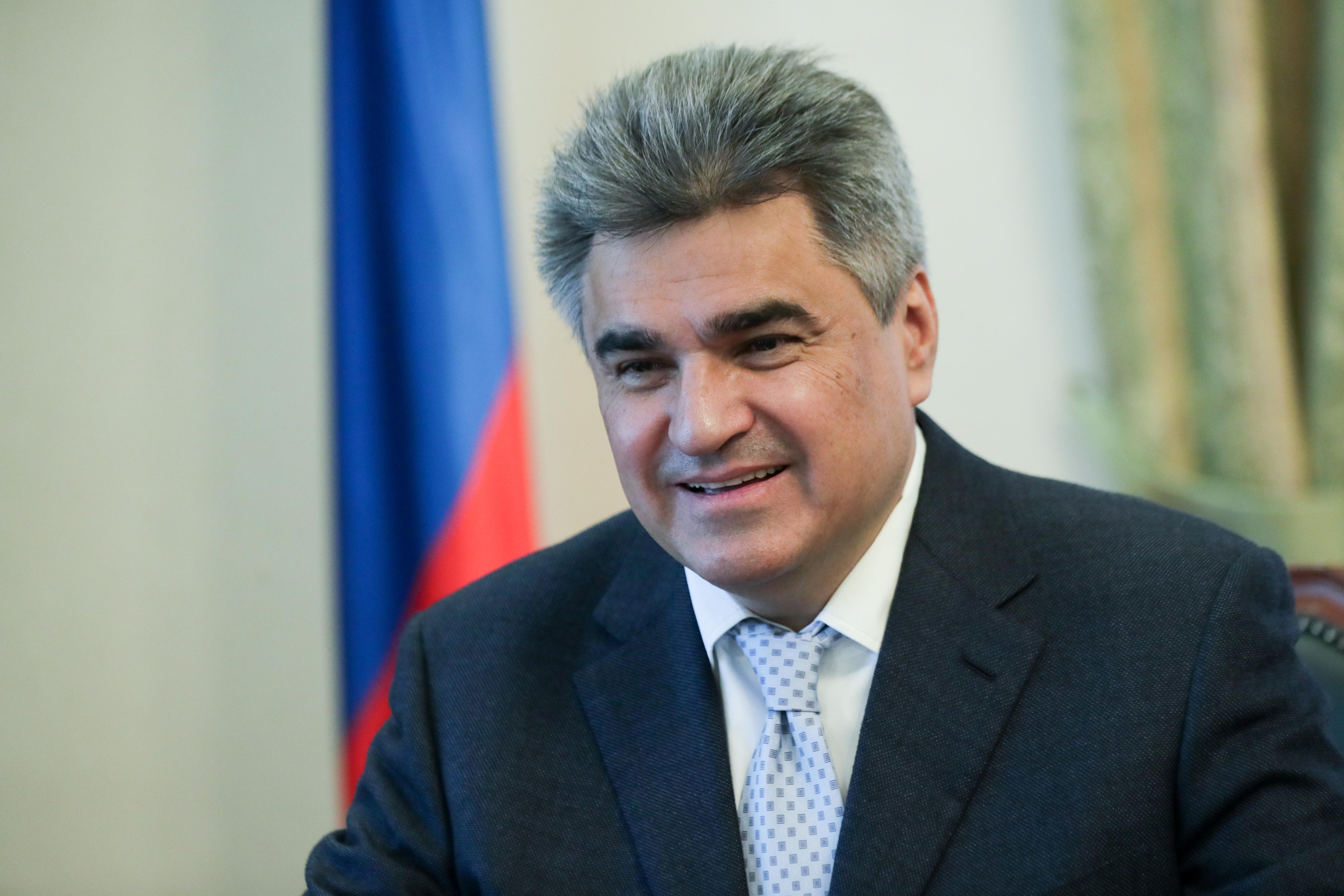
Alexey Nechayev, founder and current leader of the party

New People (Russian: Новые люди, romanized: Novyye lyudi) is a populist and communitarian political party in Russia formed in 2020. It considers itself as a "liberal party" while observers often refer to it as centrist to centre-right.

The party, like other new parties that appeared at the beginning of 2020, is accused of spoiling, justifying this opinion by the fact of quick registration and the absence of obstacles from the authorities. In addition, the leader of the New People, Alexey Nechayev, was a member of the Central Council of the All-Russia People's Front until 2021, headed by Vladimir Putin. The party is also accused of having links with the current government. So, in December 2020, the party's campaign was headed by political strategist Yevgeny Minchenko, who is close to the presidential administration.

Since its first party congress, held on 8 August 2020 in Moscow, the New People Party is led by Alexey Nechayev, who is the founder of the cosmetic company Faberlic. Vladislav Davankov is the head of the executive committee of the party. In the 2021 Russian legislative election, New People won 5.43% of the nationwide vote, gaining 13 seats.

== History ==
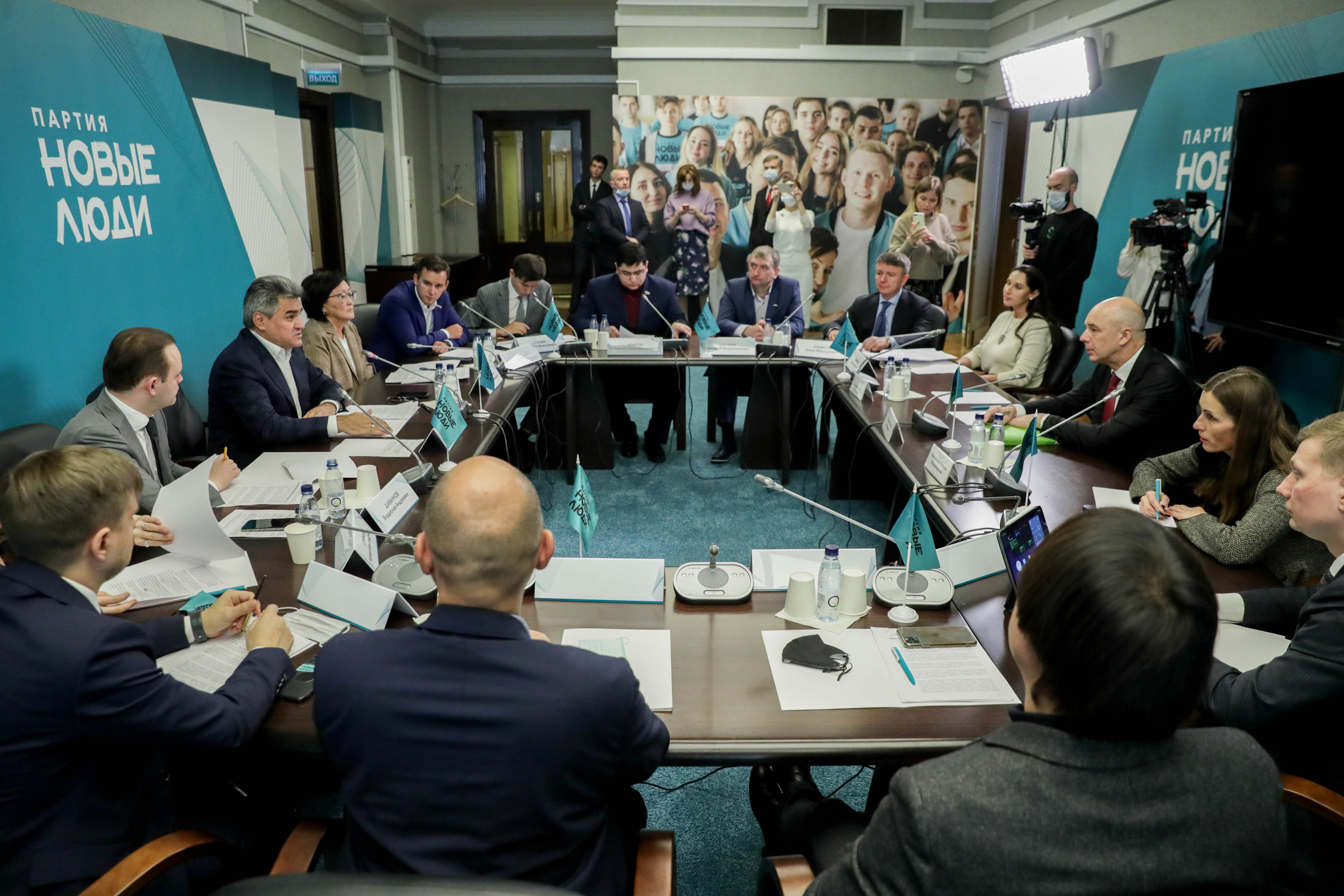
Party faction in the 8th State Duma during meeting with finance minister Anton Siluanov

In January 2020, Alexey Nechayev announced the party's creation to the media. On 1 March 2020, the constituent congress of New People was held. 55 party regional branches were created. Official party registration was received from the Russian Ministry of Justice at the end of March. In April 2020, the party sent an appeal to the State Duma and the Federation Council and called on them to adopt additional laws eliminating contradictions in respect of the absence of an official emergency regime in the country.

As of 1 July 2020, New People had 55 registered regional branches, which began preparing to take part in the regional elections of September 2020 in 12 regions of the country. Also, the party declared its readiness and intent to take part in the elections to the State Duma in 2021. On 8 August 2020, the second congress of the party was held in Moscow at which its founder Alexey Nechayev was elected chairman of the party. At the end of 2020, the party announced that its election campaign for the State Duma of the VIII convocation would be led by the well-known political strategist Yevgeny Minchenko.

On 4 July 2021, a party congress was held at which the party's list and candidates for participation in the 2021 legislative election were nominated. Party leader Alexey Nechayev headed the federal list of the party. The second number in the federal list was the former Mayor of Yakutsk Sardana Avksentyeva. According to the election results, the party gained 5.3% of the vote, winning 13 seats in the State Duma. New People became the first party not from the "big four" (United Russia, Communist Party of the Russian Federation, Liberal Democratic Party of Russia and A Just Russia — For Truth) since 2007 to overcome the 5% barrier and form its own faction. In addition to the 13 deputies elected on the party list of the party, the New People faction also included two independent deputies elected in single-mandate constituencies: Dmitry Pevtsov and Oleg Leonov.

On 15 February 2022, New People's Duma faction voted against the recognition of the separatist regions of Ukraine as independent states. In a statement the party warned against jeopardizing peace and human lives in an escalating Ukraine conflict and accused the political leadership of distracting from internal affairs by seeking conflict with other nations. However, the party later withdrew its statement and proclaimed its support for the invasion. On 16 August 2022, the party called for Instagram to be unblocked.

On 24 December 2023, it was reported that the Party of Growth will be merged with New People, both parties are already part of the informal political alliance Union of Progressive Political Forces. At a joint congress on 19 April 2024, the New People and the Growth Party announced a legal unification, and all delegates voted for the unification. The parties will operate under the general name “New People”. Growth Party leader Boris Titov will head the federal political council. The only State Duma deputy from the Growth Party, Oksana Dmitriyeva, announced that she would take the position of chairwoman of the regional branch of New People in Saint Petersburg. At the same time, she stated that she did not intend to join the New People faction in the Duma.

== Ideology ==
According to mass media, the party's goal is to "reorient the state" from caring for officials to serving citizens. The party has a centre-right ideology and considers self-employed people, as well as representatives of small business, its social base. It combines support for the values of popular capitalism such as private property, a competitive economy, a decrease in the state's share in governing the country, with a social agenda, the rights of people with disabilities and an accessible barrier-free environment, as well as environmental issues, animal protection, garbage collection problems.

An important part of the party's position is the renewal and modernization of management systems and political institutions. Support for the development of modern technologies, science and education is declared. The party attracts social entrepreneurs and activists from the regions as candidates, focusing on the regional agenda.

- The party proposes to make electable positions of heads of city and regional police departments, district inspectors, prosecutors and mayors of cities. They also raise the issue of banning one person from holding one position more than twice in a lifetime.
- The party also proposes to reduce the number of state structures and officials, to reduce the powers of police and other government security structures, which the party members call inflated, to limit the costs of maintaining officials and state top managers.
- The party considers it necessary to carry out a large-scale reform of the Ministry of Internal Affairs and other power structures. One of their proposals for reform is to double the salaries of ordinary police officers.
- It is important for the party to shift budget funding from Moscow to the construction of infrastructure and job creation in the regions. The party also demands that each person be provided free of charge land for the construction of his own house or estate no further than 150 km from the place of actual residence.
- Related to this is the theme of road construction and road safety announced by the New People. The statements of the party representatives contain specific measures related to the establishment of warranty periods for road repairs, the prohibition of "mobile ambushes", the dismantling of 50% of traffic cameras and the installation of separators on the highways.
- Party leader Alexey Nechayev and other party members have repeatedly proposed to increase the border of the special tax regime for the self-employed to 5 million rubles of income per year. Another important aspect of stimulating business, from the point of view of the party, is to start teaching children the basics of entrepreneurship and financial literacy at school.
- A number of specific nutrition and health initiatives have also been added to the party program. The party is in favor of increasing the federal subsidy for school and pre-school meals by at least 50%, as well as a ban on harmful substances (antibiotics, trans fats and growth hormones) in the food of Russians.
- The party declares that all enterprises that harm the health of Russians are obliged to reduce the harmful effect: either modernize production or close down.
- The electoral barrier for the passage of parties to the State Duma "New People" propose to reduce from 5% of the number of voters to 1 million votes. Elections are proposed to be held in electronic form, and for participation in them, citizens should be awarded incentive points for paying for housing and communal services or taxes.
- The party proposes to increase the participation of citizens in state and municipal government by expanding the practice of people's budgeting.
- The party stands for the abolition of laws used to implement state censorship: in particular, the law on extremism and the law on insulting government officials.

== Elections ==
On 1 June 2020, the Ministry of Justice added the party to the list of associations eligible to participate in elections. Election commissions did not allow party lists to participate in the elections in the Belgorod and Voronezh Oblasts, as well as to the elections to the city duma of Rostov-on-Don, by rejecting voters signatures.

On the Single Election Day, 13 September 2020, the party overcame the electoral barrier in all four regions where it participated, namely in Novosibirsk (7.0%), Kaluga (8.08%), Ryazan (5.7%) and Kostroma (7.5%). The party also took part in the elections to the Tomsk City Duma having received 10,945 votes. In the elections to the city duma of Krasnodar, the election commission announced the party's result in 4.97% of votes. Party candidates also took part in municipal elections in Samara and Nizhny Novgorod. The party ranked second in terms of financial expenditures in the elections in the third quarter of 2020, spending 179 million rubles, after United Russia with 261 million rubles.

== Election results ==
=== Presidential elections ===
Election	Candidate	First round		Second round		Result
Election	Candidate	Votes	%	Votes	%	Result
2024	Vladislav Davankov	3,362,484	3.90			Lost

=== Federal parliamentary elections ===
Election	Leader	Votes	%	Seats	+/–	Rank	Government
2021	Alexey Nechayev	2,997,676	5.32	13 / 450		5th	Support
2026	Alexey Nechayev	5,253,202	7.92	19 / 450	▲6	▲4th	Opposition

=== Regional parliamentary elections ===
Regional parliaments of Russia in which New People is represented.

Regional parliament	Election year and amount of Seats						Current seats		Next election
Regional parliament	Election year and amount of Seats						No.	Position	Next election
Regional parliament	2020	2021	2022	2023	2024	2025	No.	Position	Next election
Bashkortostan	0			1			1 / 110	6th	2028
Buryatia	0			5			5 / 66	3rd	2028
Donetsk People's Republic	0			4			4 / 90	4th	2028
Kalmykia	0			1			1 / 27	4th	2028
Republic of Karelia	0	1					1 / 36	6th	2026
Komi Republic	0					1	1 / 30	5th	2030
Sakha Republic	0			6			6 / 70	2nd	2028
Tatarstan	0				2		2 / 100	4th	2029
Tuva	0				1		1 / 32	3rd	2029
Chuvashia	0	1					1 / 44	5th	2026
Kamchatka Krai	0	1					1 / 28	5th	2026
Khabarovsk Krai	0				1		1 / 36	4th	2029
Krasnodar Krai	0			1			1 / 70	5th	2026
Krasnoyarsk Krai	0	2					2 / 52	4th	2026
Perm Krai	0	2					2 / 60	4th	2026
Amur Oblast	0	1					1 / 27	6th	2026
Arkhangelsk Oblast	0			1			1 / 47	5th	2028
Astrakhan Oblast	0	1					1 / 44	6th	2026
Chelyabinsk Oblast	0					2	2 / 46	4th	2030
Irkutsk Oblast	0			2			2 / 45	4th	2028
Kaluga Oblast	2					1	1 / 40	6th	2030
Kemerovo Oblast	0			1			1 / 46	5th	2028
Kirov Oblast	0	1					1 / 40	5th	2026
Kostroma Oblast	1					1	1 / 35	5th	2030
Kurgan Oblast	0					1	1 / 34	5th	2030
Kursk Oblast	0	1					1 / 45	5th	2026
Lipetsk Oblast	0	1					1 / 42	5th	2026
Magadan Oblast	0					1	1 / 21	5th	2030
Moscow Oblast	0	1					1 / 52	5th	2026
Nizhny Novgorod Oblast	0	1					1 / 52	5th	2026
Novgorod Oblast	0	1					1 / 32	5th	2026
Novosibirsk Oblast	3					4	4 / 76	4th	2030
Omsk Oblast	0	2					2 / 44	4th	2026
Oryol Oblast	0	1					1 / 50	4th	2026
Pskov Oblast	0	1					1 / 26	3rd (Note: Tied with other parties.)	2026
Ryazan Oblast	1					0	0 / 40	4th	2030
Sakhalin Oblast	0		2				2 / 28	2nd	2027
Samara Oblast	0	1					1 / 50	4th	2026
Saratov Oblast	0		1				1 / 45	5th	2027
Sverdlovsk Oblast	0	2					2 / 50	5th	2026
Volgograd Oblast	0				1		1 / 38	5th	2029
Voronezh Oblast	0					1	1 / 56	4th	2030
Tomsk Oblast	0	2					2 / 42	5th	2026
Yaroslavl Oblast	0			2			2 / 46	3rd	2028
Moscow	0				1		1 / 45	5th	2029
Saint Petersburg	0	3					3 / 50	4th	2026
Sevastopol	0				2		2 / 24	2nd	2029

== Leaders ==
1. Irena Lukyanova, 1 March – 8 August 2020
2. Alexey Nechayev, since 8 August 2020

== Criticism ==
The party opposes many policies of the incumbent United Russia government, although it has adopted a more neutral to moderately supportive stance towards Vladimir Putin specifically. Its abstention in the vote to recognise the Donetsk and Luhansk people's republics is an example. It has therefore been described by critics as a spoiler that attracts young and liberal voters. According to sources in the party leadership, Nechayev's entourage and the presidential administration, the new composition of the campaign headquarters should adjust the party's strategy so that the constitutional majority in the State Duma remains with United Russia, and the New People return to their electoral niche – educated middle class aged 18–30.

Pavel Salin, director of the Center for Political Science Research at the Financial University under the Government, called the party "a spoiler for street protest activity".

According to the results of the investigation by MBKh Media, the popularity of the party was ensured not so much by the creativity of its members or the "marathon of ideas", but by the promotion strategy in the regions. MBKh Media came to this conclusion in the course of studying the party's partnerships with regional media. Several media managers in different editions of the Central Federal District and the Southern Federal District confirmed to MBKh Media the facts of cooperation with the party without formalizing the relevant documents and complying with the law on advertising. Publications publish the materials needed by New People, covering its activities in a positive light, for money, without making a mandatory note about it in publications, as required by Russian law.

In the Legislative Assembly of Omsk Oblast, New People party opposed including on the agenda of the next session the issue of returning direct elections of mayors and district heads, although such an item was in their election program. At the same time, before the elections to the State Duma of the 8th convocation, the party spoke in its program about the need to return direct elections, the leader of New People, Nechayev, stated this at the federal level. As Ilya Smirnov, leader of New People faction in the Legislative Assembly of Omsk Oblast, later explained, the faction opposed the inclusion of the CPRF bill on the agenda, because the explanatory note to the bill stated that the bill would not require additional budget expenditures, while the mayoral elections cost money.

The initiative of Sardana Avksentyeva to allow the law of a constituent entity of the Russian Federation to take measures to regulate the number of certain species of animals without owners on the basis of a local referendum received resonance. A little over a week later, a different bill of all factions except the CPRF was introduced into the State Duma, with the participation of Avksentyeva and her party colleague, Georgy Arapov, supported by the Government. During the voting, New People party, with the exception of the co-authors of the supported bill (and Avksentyeva voted only in the first reading), opposed both initiatives.

During the gubernatorial elections of Altai Krai scheduled for 8–10 September 2023, the New People candidate Vladislav Vakaev, who spent 20 million rubles on his campaign, withdrew his candidacy in mid-August and supported the current governor from United Russia, Viktor Tomenko. The regional branch of the party called the act of its nominee a betrayal.

== Sanctions ==
In December 2022 the EU sanctioned New People in relation to the 2022 Russian invasion of Ukraine.
