= Anatoly Loktionov =

Russian businessman

- Анатолий Локтионов
- Born: Anatoly Gavrilovich Loktionov; 1947 (age 78–79); Russia
- Education: Moscow Aviation Institute
- Occupation: Businessman
- Known for: Former Vice President of Russian energy company Rosneft and accusations of large scale fraud
- Criminal charges: Two counts of grand embezzlement (2010)
- Criminal status: Acquitted in 2021

Anatoly Gavrilovich Loktionov (Russian: Анатолий Гаврилович Локтионов) is a Russian businessman who was the former first vice-president of the major Russian oil company Rosneft.

In 2010 he was accused of involvement of large scale fraud in a criminal case by the Russian government. He was put on Russian federal and international wanted lists and convicted in absentia. He left Russia in 2011 and was hiding from Russian justice authorities. His accusers were later jailed and he was acquitted of all charges in 2021.

== Early life ==
Anatoly Loktionov was born in 1947 in Russia. In 1976, he graduated from the Moscow Aviation Institute.

== Career ==
In the 1970s and 1980s, he worked at the Moscow Machine-Building Plant Znamya Truda, as well as at the All-Russian Research Institute of Physico-Technical and Radio Engineering Measurements. In 1994 he became the general director of JSC Petro Trade and remained until 1998.

From 1998, he held positions at Rosneft OJSC (First Vice-president and Advisor, until 2006).

In 2000, he became the founder of Energo Impex (later renamed Highlander International Trading to hide traces of activity). The company was engaged in the resale of oil and oil products from the resources of Rosneft and the legalization of the profits.

In 2005, Loktionov became a minority co-owner of CJSC Naftatrans. Subsequently, Anatoly Loktionov claimed that Naftatrans had been taken from him. However, he was never listed in the share register of Naftatrans, and until 2006, he worked for the state-owned company Rosneft, and therefore was not entitled to engage in entrepreneurial activity personally or even through authorized representatives, or participate in the management of an economic entity, which was regulated through legal acts.

In May 2010, Nanase Limited bought from Anatoly Loktionov a 99% stake in the Panamanian company Erin Resources SA, which, in turn, is the beneficiary of a 30% stake in the Cyprus company Glydfern Limited, which owns ZAO Naftatrans. Loktionov hired Nanase Limited, represented by Litvak, to acquire a stake from his partners in Rayhill, as well as in Glidefern; gaining control of Naftatrans through the appointment of a Director General; Loktionov exercise of their right to vote; achieve the sale of Erin shares to your partners or to a third party. "

According to the hearings in the English court, Loktionov set as his goal either to take full control of Naftatrans, or to sell his stake to a third party as expensive as possible. Loktionov hired Nanase Limited to threaten his partners with the threat of a raider seizure of the company (for example, by appointing "his" CEO) or cheaply selling him his shares or expensive to buy Loktionov's shares. But Nanase Limited failed to cope with the task and Loktionov began litigation with this structure. "Loktionov's cooperation with Nanase Limited led to the fact that in 2010 a criminal case was initiated against Loktionov under Part 4 of Art. 159 and Part 3 of Art. 30 of the Criminal Code. This was a failed attempt on the part of Loktionov to carry out a raider seizure of 100% of the shares of "Naftatrans" through the imposition of an arrest on the basis of a fake surety contract, the lawsuit on which was filed in the Khamovnichesky Court of Moscow.

In November 2010, Loktionov filed a lawsuit against a private collector from Russia demanding to recover 10 million euros from him for disrupting sales of 16th century paintings. After litigation of Loktionov, he tried to make a raider seizure of the Europark shopping center, which, ultimately, was sold to Samvel Karapetyan. Karapetyan said that Loktionov and Smagin told him directly that if he didn't give them Europark, the fate of Egiazaryan, who had previously had to leave Russia, was waiting for him.

In 2012, the documents were made public and it became known that Loktionov was engaged in the legalization of profits (obtained from the resale of oil and oil products from the resources of Rosneft through its own company) and the withdrawal of assets through the Swiss bank BNP Paribas. BNP PARIBAS gave Loktionov tools for laundering, and also advised how to whiten, protect and increase the condition. The press published BNP Paribas experts prepared and certified by Anatoly Loktionov "Welfare Planning Decisions", which, in fact, are proposals for the creation of fictitious and offshore companies by the bank in the interests of Loktionov. "The French newspaper Le Monde published the results of the Swiss Leaks Swiss investigative journalism branch of the British bank HSBC. The accounts in this bank could be used by criminals in many countries to launder capital, trade in arms and drugs, and finance international terrorism. Separately, it was noted that Russian clients in total held $1.7 billion in HSBC accounts. Anatoly Loktionov was among the clients of the bank. Anatoly Loktionov is listed in the bank as a resident of Switzerland with the address in the fashionable suburb of Geneva – Vandovre on the Route de la Capitte, 140.

== Corruption schemes ==
=== Pricing difference ===
Loktionov for 10 allowed "pumping" about 40% of oil and oil products from the entire export volume of the state-owned company. According to some estimates, the amount of theft from Russia due to the price difference was about $1 billion. Personal wealth Loktionova, according to various estimates, not less than 700 million dollars. At the same time, according to officially filed tax returns, Loktionov's income amounted to $2.5 million. According to media reports, the cost of Loktionov's mansion on Rublevka is $100 million, and the total value of foreign and Russian real estate is $450 million. Sales of gasoline by Highlander International Trading provoked losses at Rosneft:

- 1 million 194 thousand US dollars in 2002;
- 4 million 711 thousand US dollars in 2003;
- 10 million US dollars in 2005.

=== Stock repurchase ===
It is reported that Loktionov stole from the company Rosneft cash in the amount of 280 million US dollars. He applied a stock repurchase system. Having initially acquired Rosneft shares through Sintez for $20 million, he transferred them to his other organization, Highlander International Trading. After that, he sold the shares back to Rosneft for $300 million.

=== Tender at the Komsomolsk Refinery ===
When the Komsomolsk refinery owned by Rosneft was loaded, the company periodically purchased resources from third-party producers in volumes up to 150 thousand tons of oil per month. At the same time, Anatoly Loktionov arranged a "tender": $10 from each ton of oil was personally in his hands to get a contract. Thus, the monthly income of Anatoly Loktionov in this scheme probably reached $1.5 million or $18 million annually.

== Criminal proceedings ==
In 2011, he became the defendant in a criminal case on a knowingly false denunciation (part 2 of article 306 of the Criminal Code of the Russian Federation), in 2012 the Tagansky district court elected a preventive measure in the form of taking into custody. In connection with this case, Loktionov was forced to hide outside the Russian Federation, and in 2014 he demanded to transfer a new passport to him, submitting an application to the Khamovnichesky Court of Moscow.

In 2015, Loktionov became a defendant in yet another criminal case on fraud on a large scale (part 4 of Article 159 of the Criminal Code of the Russian Federation). The case was opened by the Investigation Department of the Ministry of Internal Affairs for Krasnodar in 2015 against the employees of the Stroyklass company, who stole 6.65 million rubles from the shareholder of the DB Development development company Dmitry Garkusha. According to investigators, Dmitry Garkusha, suffered a total damage of 101.6 million rubles.

Dmitry Garkusha invested money in the construction of the residential complex "High Coast" in Anapa. He also owned 20% of Stroyklass LLC, controlled by Loktionov, and in 2008 allocated $4 million and 6.65 million Russian rubles for the construction of Vysokoy Bereg. The construction of the LCD was frozen. As a result, in order to settle the obligations, the parties concluded an agreement on the joint sale of the project. Loktionov received the right to negotiate the sale of a 100% stake in Stroyklass, but he did not find a buyer, as a result of which neither his share in Stroyklass nor money was returned. In 2013, Loktionova was put on the federal wanted list. In 2016, he was already on the international wanted list due to the fact that it became known that Anatoly Loktionov lives in London. In 2018, Loktionov admitted his guilt and agreed to cooperate with the investigation, as a result of which he was included in the "Titov list", due to which he was able to return to his homeland. On 22 November 2018, he returned to Russia from London under the guarantee of business ombudsman Boris Titov. After returning to Russia, Loktionov began to participate in investigative actions, but however, the criminal investigation against him is still ongoing, and the charges have not been dropped.

The return to Russia is attributed to the fact that the UK passed the Criminal Finances Act. It provides for the introduction of UWO (Unexplained Wealth Orders) – "Orders for wealth of unknown origin". This tool allows the authorities to demand from the owners of any suspicious assets worth over 50 thousand pounds sterling an explanation of their origin. Possible arrest of property if the owner can not prove the legality of the origin of their income."

Loktionov interested in the authorities of France and (Germany). For a fee of 2.5 million euros, they were given information about HSBC's customers. All of these clients opened bank accounts in 1990–2007, with a total of over $100 billion in deposits. German, French and Belgian prosecutors became interested in this list, suspecting that Russian citizens were hiding from paying taxes. It is noted that Anatoly Loktionov indicated to the bank as his place of residence "a house in the fashionable suburb of Geneva – Vandovre on Ruth de la Capit, 140. Information from the Geneva registry confirms that the land belongs to Loktionov and his wife. There is a two-storied mansion with a small artificial pond on the site near Lake Geneva."

== The property ==
Loktionov bought real estate in Russia and abroad. To the list of acquired property include:

- the palace in the village of Nikolino, the total cost of $100 million;
- 4 apartments in the center of Moscow in the amount of more than $70 million;
- 2 country houses and nine land plots in the Moscow region;
- a house on the outskirts of Geneva Vandover on the Route de la Capit;
- a house in France at Cape Martin for 200 million euros;
- real estate in England and Monaco.

The approximate value of foreign property is estimated at $173 million. According to the tax authorities of the Russian Federation, the income of Anatoly Loktionov is 396 million rubles, which is equivalent to about 8.8 million pounds sterling – 13 times less than the value of the real estate purchased by him.

Before returning to Russia, Loktionov lived in the most prestigious area of Knightsbridge – the "golden mile" of London, next to Arab sheikhs and representatives of the Chinese business elite.

When selling the Loktionov mansion on Rublevka in the closed cottage village of Nikolino (the second Uspenskoye highway), the concern of Moscow realtors appeared. Sotheby's International Realty International Real Estate Agency has already informed potential buyers about the price of the estate: $100 million. The total area of the estate is 2.3 thousand square meters. m., and the area of the site with all adjacent buildings – 97 acres.
