= Kukharenko =

Kukharenko is a Ukrainian language surname derived from the occupation kukhar, cook.

It may refer to:

- Alexander Kukharenko, a Russian mineralogist, the namesake of kukharenkoite
- Sergei Kukharenko is a Russian political and public activist, the leader of Amur Oblast regional department of the Right Cause right-wing liberal political party, member of the federal presidium of "People's Anticorruption Movement".
- Yakiv Kukharenko, ataman of the Kuban Cossack Host
