= Party of Growth =

Party of Growth Партия Роста
- Party of Growth logo since 2020
- Chairman: Boris Titov
- Co-chairs: Boris Titov, Alexander Lyubimov, Oksana Dmitriyeva, Sergey Stankevich, Yevgeny Kogan, Ilya Sachkov, Sergey Shnurov, Kseniya Bezuglova, Nikolai Fomenko
- Founder: Boris Titov
- Founded: 26 March 2016; 10 years ago
- Dissolved: 19 April 2024; 2 years ago
- Preceded by: Right Cause
- Merged into: New People
- Headquarters: 2nd Building, Bersenevsky lane, Moscow, Russia. 119072
- Ideology: Liberal conservatism Conservative liberalism Economic liberalism
- Political position: Centre-right
- National affiliation: All-Russia People's Front; Union of Progressive Political Forces
- Colours: Red and Blue (official); Light blue (customary)

Website
- rost.ru

Party of Growth (Russian: Партия Роста, romanized: Partiya Rosta, pronounced [ˈpartʲɪjə ˈrostə]) was a liberal-conservative political party in Russia which had representatives in several local legislatures. Created in March 2016 on the basis of the Right Cause party, the party's main policy stances are liberal free market economy, democracy and protecting the rights of the middle class. The party was led by Boris Titov since its founding. The party was a member of the pro-Putin All-Russia People's Front.

On November 20, 2025, the party was officially dissolved.

== History ==
=== Creation ===
Logo of the Party of Growth before 2020

Right Cause was founded in November 2008 as a merger of three parties: the Union of Right Forces (SPS), Civilian Power and the Democratic Party of Russia. SPS and Civilian Power were both regarded as liberal parties, supporting free market reforms, protection of private property and a decentralized federal government. The Democratic Party also supported liberal values, but its programme was more conservative and nationalistic.

By 2008, the three parties were all in a state of decline. While SPS had achieved 8.7% of votes in the 1999 Duma election, in the 2007 election it only received 0.96%. Support for the Democratic Party (0.13%) and Civilian Power (1.05%) in the 2007 election was also low. SPS—highly critical of Vladimir Putin and United Russia in its 2007 election campaign—was losing voters because Putin had adopted many of the market reforms championed by SPS, and also because companies started to withdraw their financial support from the party. With falling support and votes being lost to United Russia, the three parties, among others, considered mergers in order to survive. The decision to initiate the merger was made in October 2008, and in November the unification was completed. The new party, called Right Cause, was officially registered on 18 February 2009. The party's creation was supported by the presidential administration of Dmitry Medvedev.

The merger was opposed by SPS founding member and former Deputy Prime Minister Boris Nemtsov, who believed the new party would not offer true political opposition, while another SPS founding member Anatoly Chubais, widely considered the architect of Russia's privatization program, voiced strong support for the merger, saying that "a political party is one that participates in elections with chances to win."

=== Controversy ===
Despite allegations that the party is too close to the Kremlin be a real opposition party, Right Cause was involved in controversy, finding itself in opposition to the authorities. In January 2009, an arrest warrant was issued for Yevgeny Chichvarkin, founder of leading mobile phone retailer Euroset and anticipated head of Right Cause for the Moscow Region. The warrant was issued in absentia, as Chichvarkin is currently in London, England., to proclaim its support for Chichvarkin, and according to The Moscow Times, the party suggests that the legal action is "an example of the authorities unjustly targeting business."

=== First elections ===
The first major election where Right Cause took part was the Moscow City Duma elections in October 2009. The party was predicted to receive between 5 and 8% of the vote, but only managed to register one candidate, who was defeated. Many commentators assumed that this was part of an effort by city officials of Yury Luzhkov's administration to restrict the chances of opposition parties. Multiple Right Cause members blamed the party leadership for not properly organizing the registration and campaign.

=== 2011–2016 ===
The party currently has representation in several city legislatures, but lacks representation on the regional level. According to a survey conducted in March 2008, less than 2% of the Russian population were loyalists of the party. In April 2011, support for Right Cause was 2.9%. The party's performance has been a disappointment, with analysts attributing its low popularity to the lack of a charismatic leader.

In May 2011, billionaire businessman Mikhail Prokhorov announced a plan to join the leadership of Right Cause. Prohkorov promised to make Right Cause Russia's second largest party on a pro-business platform that will "totally transform" the country. In a television interview, Prokhorov said: "We have got to return to a 14 percent tax, leave small business alone, simplify paperwork and let small business work in peace... I think we won't recognize the country in five to 10 years." On 25 June 2011, Prokhorov was elected to the leadership of the party at the party congress of 2011. At the acceptance ceremony, Prokhorov officially criticized the present ruling tandem of Medvedev-Putin, the structure of Russia, and vowed to bring Russia back to a stable development course. In September 2011, Prokhorov said he had quit Right Cause, "condemning it as a 'puppet Kremlin party' micromanaged by a 'puppet master' in the president’s office..., Vladislav Y. Surkov," according to a report in The New York Times.

On 23 September 2011, the International Democrat Union suspended the associate member status of the Right Cause, lamenting that the party was under "direct control" of the Kremlin and all "liberal voices" had been silenced. Instead, the re-founded Union of Rightist Forces was made a new associate member.

=== 2018 election ===
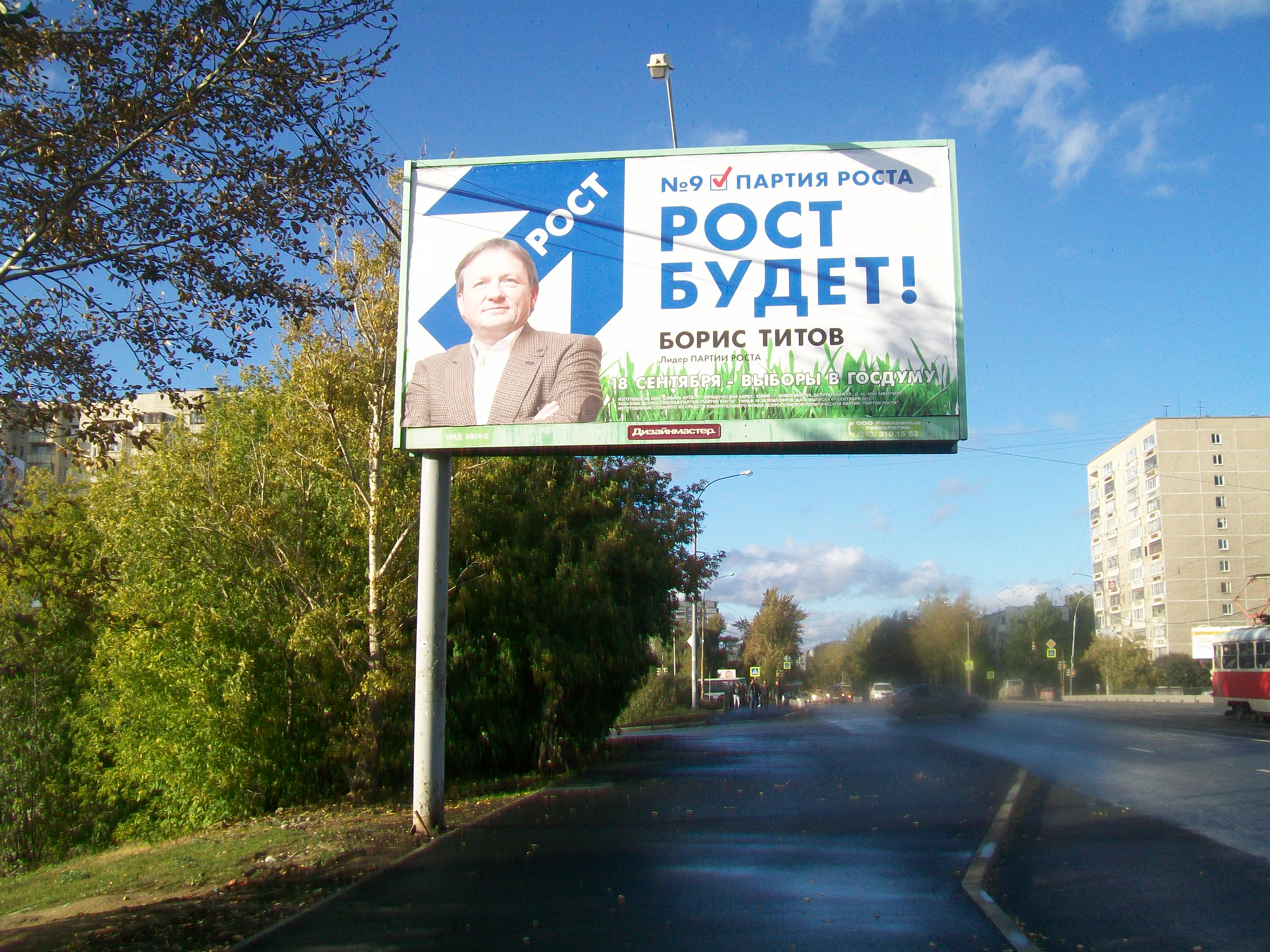
Party of Growth billboard in Yekaterinburg during the 2016 State Duma election

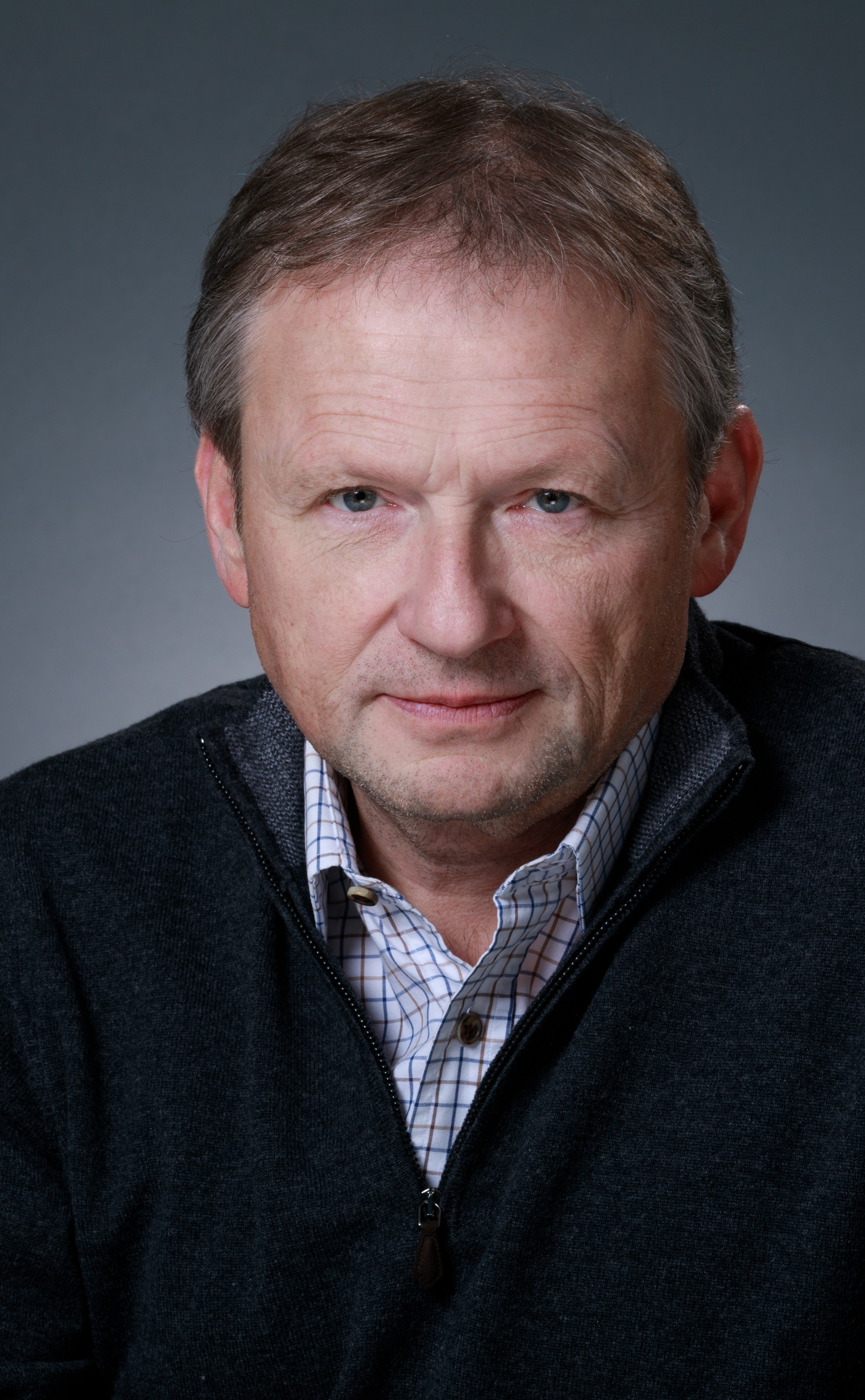
Boris Titov, party leader since 2016 and 2018 presidential nominee

On 26 March 2016, the party was renamed to the "Party of Growth". In the 2016 State Duma election, the party scored 1.21%, not breaking the 5% barrier and did not pass to the State Duma.

In July 2017, Party of Growth announced that it would hold primaries to nominate a presidential candidate for the 2018 election. Four candidates participated in the primaries: Oksana Dmitriyeva, Dmitry Potapenko, Dmitry Marinichev and Alexander Huruji. Voting was conducted via the internet from August to November 2017. On 10 August 2017, the party's press secretary told the media that the results of the primaries will be taken into account at the party congress which will be held to decide the candidate for Party of Growth. However, the winner of the primaries would not guarantee themselves the right to run on behalf of the party. On 26 November, it was announced that the party would nominate party leader Boris Titov, who was not involved in the primaries. According to a person from the party leadership, none of the proposed candidates were able to obtain sufficient support. Titov scored 0.8% in the election.

=== 2023 merger ===
In December 2023, it was reported that the party will be merged with New People.

At a joint congress on 19 April 2024, the New People and the Growth Party announced a legal unification, and all delegates voted for the unification. The parties will operate under the general name "New People". Growth Party leader Boris Titov will head the federal political council. The only State Duma deputy from the Growth Party, Oksana Dmitriyeva, announced that she would take the position of chairwoman of the regional branch of New People in Saint Petersburg. At the same time, she stated that she did not intend to join the New People faction in the Duma.

=== Dissolution ===
On 20 November 2025, the Supreme Court of Russia ordered the party's dissolution following a request from the party itself, citing failure to meet legal requirements for regional representation. By that time, 32 of its regional branches had been closed or merged, with its remaining 43 branches falling short of the minimum required in at least half of Russia's federal subjects.

== Platform ==
Party of Growth positions itself as a pro-business party in favour of free market reforms, privatization, and protecting the interests of the middle class. The party supports "a broad application of the elective principle", including direct elections of mayors and a gradual return to elections of regional governors. It also supports lowering the threshold for election into the State Duma from 7% to 5% (the threshold was lowered in 2011). The party platform calls for more control to the legislative branch over the executive branch, openness and transparency in the government, and freedom of information. In the economy, the party supports a model entitled "Capitalism for All", which emphasizes developing domestic demand as the main prerequisite for economic diversification, modernization, and the growth of domestic production. The main stimulus for the economy should not be cheap labour, but high income levels.

According to a 2008 research study by Colton, Hale and McFaul, the main policy stances associated with the party by the electorate are liberal economy, pro-Westernism and democracy.

The Party of Growth opposes the 2022 Russian invasion of Ukraine, believing that the war has made international investment in Russia "meaningless".

== Election results ==
=== Presidential ===
| Election | Candidate | First round | | Second round | | Result |
| Election | Candidate | Votes | % | Votes | % | Result |
|---|---|---|---|---|---|---|
| 2018 | Boris Titov | 556,801 | 0.76% | —N/a | | Lost |

=== Legislative ===
| Election | Party leader | Performance | | | | | Rank | Government |
| Election | Party leader | Votes | % | ± pp | Seats | +/– | Rank | Government |
|---|---|---|---|---|---|---|---|---|
| 2016 | Boris Titov | 679,030 | 1.31% | ▲0.71 (Note: Regarding the results of the Right Cause) | 0 / 450 | 0 | ▼9th | Extra-parliamentary |
| 2021 | Boris Titov | 291,483 | 0.64% | ▼0.65 | 1 / 450 | ▲1 | ▼13th | Opposition |

== Structure ==
=== Leaders ===
- Georgy Bovt, journalist
- Boris Titov, former leader of the civic organisation Delovaya Rossiya (until 24 December 2009)

=== Regional leaders ===
- Moscow – Igor Trunov
- Moscow Region – Boris Nadezhdin
- Primorskiy Krai – Nikolai Morozov
- Amur Region – Sergei Kukharenko
- Mordovia – Stanislav Aranovich
- Tyumen Region – Alexander Bezdelov
- Nizhegorodskaya Oblast – Denis Labuza
- Tambovskaya Oblast – Yury Antsiferov
