= Leonid Gozman =

Russian politician

- Леонид Гозман
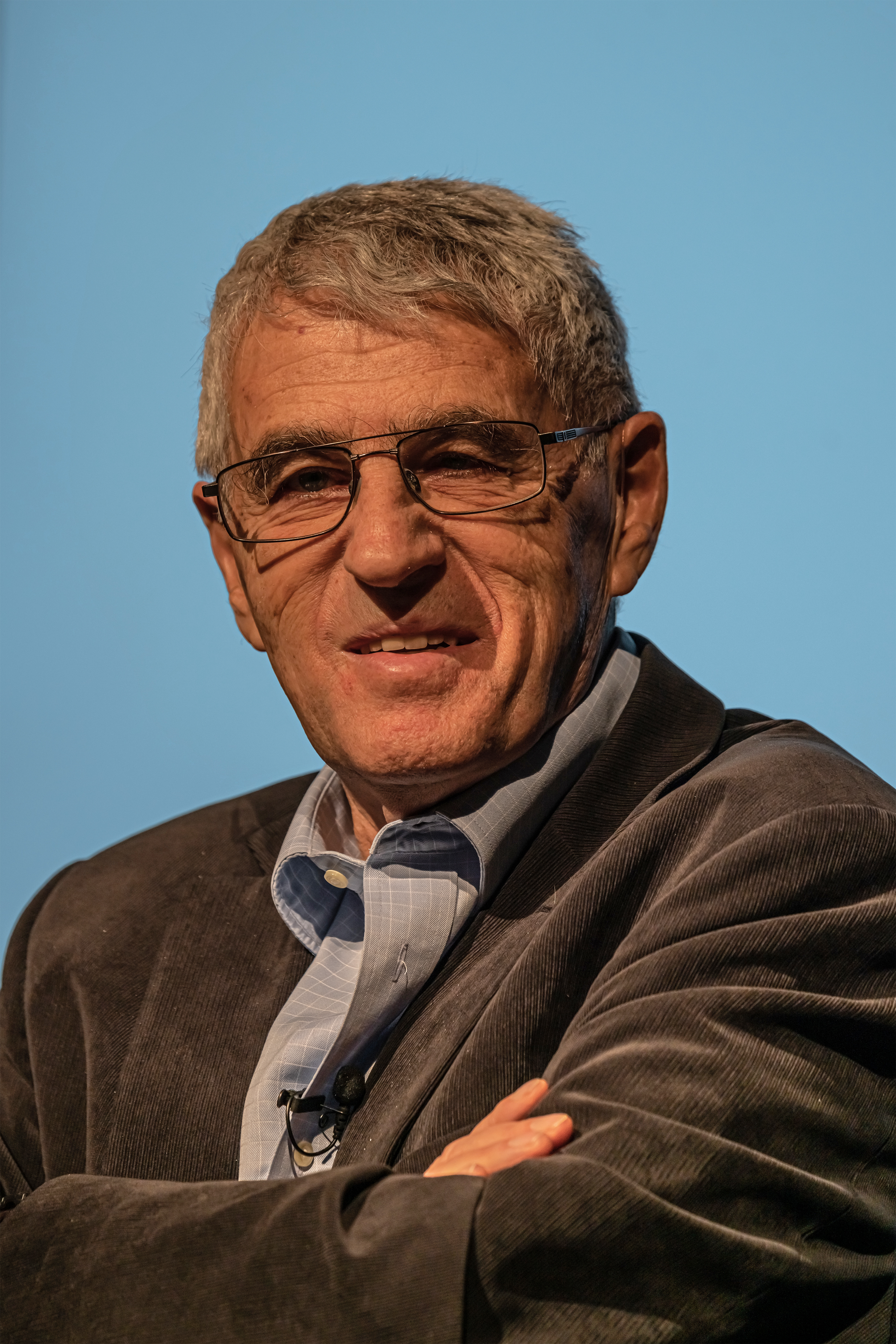
- Gozman in 2023

Personal details
- Born: 13 July 1950 (age 76) Leningrad, Russian SFSR, Soviet Union
- Citizenship: Russia, Israel
- Party: Union of Right Forces
- Other political affiliations: Democratic Choice of Russia; PCA; Just Cause
- Education: Moscow State University

Leonid Yakovlevich Gozman (Russian: Леонид Яковлевич Гозман; born 13 July 1950) is an Israeli-Russian politician who served as the president of the Union of Right Forces.

== Early life ==
Leonid Gozman was born on 13 July 1950 into a Jewish family in Leningrad. In 1976, he graduated from the Faculty of Psychology of Moscow State University and started teaching there the same year. Gozman obtained his PhD degree in 1983 and later became the chair of the Political Psychology Laboratory.

== Political career in Russia ==
In 1992, Gozman became acquainted with Yegor Gaidar, the First Deputy Prime Minister of Russia, and became his advisor. In 1993, he joined the Choice of Russia, an electoral bloc of Boris Yeltsin supporters led by Gaidar. When this bloc became a political party in 1994, Gozman joined its political council. In the State Duma election of December 1995, he received 5.32% of the vote; his party, the Democratic Choice of Russia, won 3.86% of the vote, failing to reach the 5% electoral threshold for proportional representation, but won 9 of the 450 Duma seats.

In 1996, Gozman became an adviser to Anatoly Chubais, presidential chief of staff and later First Deputy Prime Minister. In 1998, Chubais was elected chairman of the board of RAO UES, the state-owned energy monopoly, and the next year Gozman joined him as a member of the board.

In August 1999, Gozman became a deputy chief of staff of the Union of Right Forces, a coalition of liberal political parties formed for that year's legislative election. In 2000, he endorsed Vladimir Putin's bid for presidency, saying that "supporting any other candidate would be worse".

After the Union failed to pass the 5% electoral threshold in the 2003 election, most of its leadership resigned. Chubais, still interested in keeping the party alive, became its informal leader. In 2005, he suggested Gozman as the next party chairman but, due to the opposition of Boris Nemtsov, 29-year-old Nikita Belykh was appointed instead and the deputy chairman post was created for Gozman.

The Union of Right Forces received 0.97% of the votes in the 2007 election. The party leadership resigned in the aftermath, but the same evening Belykh and Gozman were reappointed to their positions.

RAO UES was dissolved in July 2008. On 22 September Chubais was appointed head of the newly established state company Rusnano. The next month Gozman was appointed his advisor.

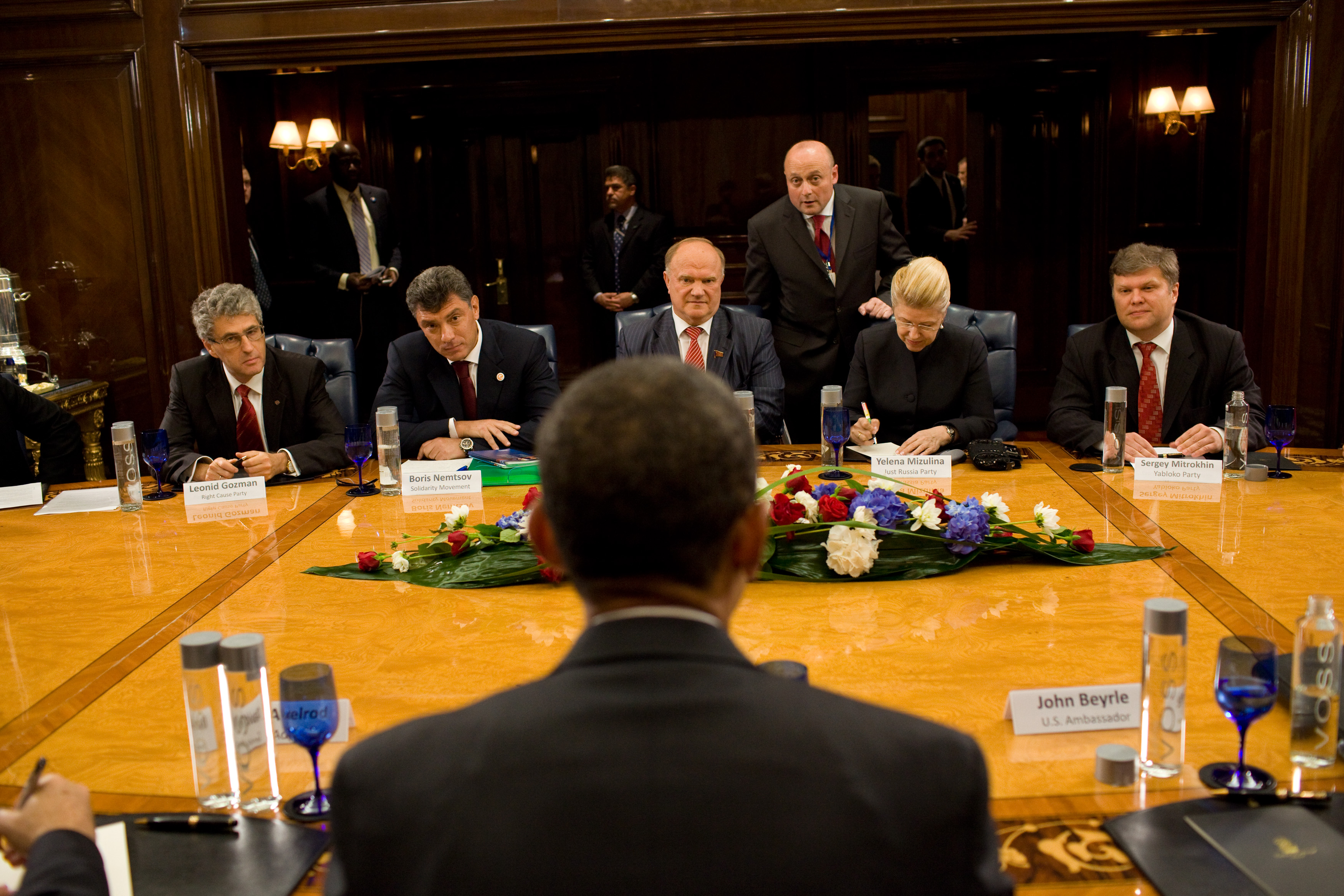
U.S. President Barack Obama with Russian political leaders Leonid Gozman, Boris Nemtsov, Gennady Zyuganov, Yelena Mizulina, and Sergey Mitrokhin in 2009

On 26 September 2008, Belykh resigned as party chairman and Gozman became its acting leader. It was announced that the Union of Right Forces would soon be merged into a new liberal party established by the Kremlin. Gozman said he had to accept this "disgusting option" to save the organisation. According to him, Chubais was "not a rich man" and could no longer finance the party, but the "new format" might help to solve its financial problems. On 15 November, the Union of Right Forces was dissolved, along with the Democratic Party of Russia and Civilian Power. The next day, the Right Cause party was founded, with Gozman appointed co-chair.

According to journalist Mikhail Zygar, in 2010 the Russian President Dmitry Medvedev tasked Vladislav Surkov to create a liberal counterpart to the ruling United Russia. It was suggested to put a liberal government official in charge of Right Cause until it was strong enough to be joined by Medvedev. Gozman supported the accession of the president's allies to the party leadership, since it would facilitate its aspirations to govern. Medvedev's candidates discussed the idea with Vladimir Putin but failed to get his approval and rejected the offer. In May 2011, billionaire Mikhail Prokhorov agreed to become the leader of Right Cause. In June, the co-chairs of the party stepped down and Prokhorov was appointed in their place. Gozman celebrated this as a "victory of our team". In September, after Prokhorov's refusal to remove Yevgeny Roizman from the party list, the billionaire was ousted from Right Cause by Surkov. Gozman called the events shameful for the reputation of the president and his staff and left the party.

== Post-politics dissident activities ==
In September 2014, he signed a statement to "Stop the aggressive adventure: To withdraw from the territory of Ukraine, Russian troops and stop the propaganda, financial and military support to the separatists in the South-East of Ukraine." He again signed an anti-war petition in January 2022 during the prelude to the Russian invasion of Ukraine.

On 25 July 2022, he was detained by Russian police in Moscow over his alleged "failure to inform the authorities swiftly enough about his citizenship of Israel".

In August 2022, he was arrested for 15 days based on a Facebook post he made in 2022, which stated that: "Hitler was an absolute evil, but Stalin was even worse. The SS were criminals, but the NKVD were even more terrible, because the Chekists murdered their own. Hitler unleashed a war against humanity; the communists declared total war against their own people." He left the country after his sentence was served.

In May 2022, Gozman was designated a "foreign agent" by the Russian authorities. In February 2024, a Moscow court ordered his arrest in absentia, alongside economist Konstantin Sonin, in connection with a criminal case alleging the dissemination of "false information" about the Russian Armed Forces, an offence prosecuted under Russia's war censorship laws.

== Bibliography ==
- Gozman, Leonid (1995). "After Chechnya: Should Aid to Russia Continue?". Problems of Post-Communism. 42 (3): 41–44. doi:10.1080/10758216.1995.11655612. Wikidata Q111318821.
- Gozman, Leonid (2018). "Subjective notes on the objective situation among Russian intellectuals". Russian Journal of Communication. 10 (2–3): 182–198. doi:10.1080/19409419.2018.1533419. Wikidata Q111318883.
- Gozman, Leonid (2021). "Democratic Russia: Why it is not a contradiction in terms". European View: 178168582110070. doi:10.1177/17816858211007069. Wikidata Q111318808.
