= Valery Akhadov =

Russian theatre and film director

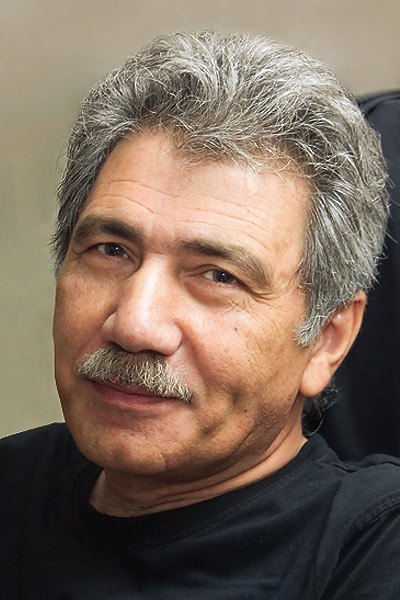
Akhadov in 2006

Valery Bakievich Akhadov (Russian: Вале́рий Баки́евич Аха́дов; born August 9, 1945, Samarkand) is a Soviet and Russian theatre and film director. He was named an Honored Art Worker of the Russian Federation in 2002.

He is a longtime director of the Tajikfilm studio, where he shot most of his films. In 1989, his film Ruf starred Annie Girardot.

Since 2004, he has been an associate professor at the Gerasimov Institute of Cinematography.

On November 16, 2008, he was elected to the first iteration of the federal political council of the newly created political party Right Cause.

== Selected filmography ==
- Forward, Guards! (TV, 1971)
- Family Affairs of the Gayurovs (TV, 1976)
- Who Will Go to Truskavets (TV, 1977)
- April Dreams (TV, 1980)
- Extra Arrives on the Second Path (TV, 1980) with Saido Kurbanov
- Ruth (1989)
- Queen's Personal Life (1993) with Zulfiya Mirshakar
- It Is Not Recommended to Offend Women (1999)
- Greenhouse Effect (2005)
- Demons (2006 TV series) (2006) with Gennady Karyuk
