= Greenhouse Effect (film) =

- Theatrical release poster
- Directed by: Valery Akhadov
- Written by: Oleg Antonov
- Produced by: Sergei Zernov; Svetlana Kuchmaeva
- Starring: Elena Polyakova; Alexander Yakin; Alexander Korshunov
- Cinematography: Rostislav Pirumov
- Music by: Darin Sysoev
- Production company: Tsentrnauchfilm
- Distributed by: Pan Terra
- Release date: 2005
- Running time: 93 min.
- Country: Russia
- Language: Russian
- Box office: $30 000

Greenhouse Effect (Russian: Парниковый эффект, romanized: Parnikovyy effekt) is a 2005 Russian melodrama film directed by Valery Akhadov. Its premiere took place as part of the competition program of the Kinotavr.

== Plot ==
A provincial girl, Rita, is robbed of her suitcase at the station. She is all alone in a foreign bustling city with no papers, no money, and no address for her friend.

Rita is assisted by Ernest, a homeless boy, who is also not needed by an indifferent society.

To help Rita, Ernest robs a store and is arrested. With the money stolen by Ernest, Rita leaves for Greece, where she settles in the house of the deceased grandparents of the Greek, a deceased friend of Ernest, and waits for the release of her friend from the colony.

== Cast ==
- Elena Polyakova as Rita
- Alexander Yakin as Ernest
- Alexander Korshunov as doctor
- Irina Loseva as nurse Marina
- Igor Petrusenko as Aleksey, observatory worker
- Pavel Seminihin as police lieutenant
- Anna Frolovtseva as grandmother Pasha
- Aleksey Rozin as airport security guard
- Alexander Fedorov as traveling companion

== Reception ==
=== Box office ===
Greenhouse Effect has grossed $30 000.

=== Accolades ===
Valery Akhadov's film was awarded two awards at the Zlín Film Festival.

=== Critical response ===
As film critic Vasily Koretsky (Time Out Russia): "It is rather embarrassing to watch the development of the platonic romance of a boy and a girl; the acting here resembles an overly intimate allusion to daughter-mothers".

According to Valery Kichin, "Valery Akhadov made a powerful picture of a cold world where there is no social protection, and everyone survives alone, a world that does not need people, is not interested in them. This is our new Russia".

Sergey Kudryavtsev notes: "Perhaps, both the motif of robbery with stabbing, and the departure to a happy land, where Goethe's heroes rushed with inescapable longing, seem like overkill in this urban story" and rates the film 6 out of 10.
