= David Yakobashvili =

Russian businessman

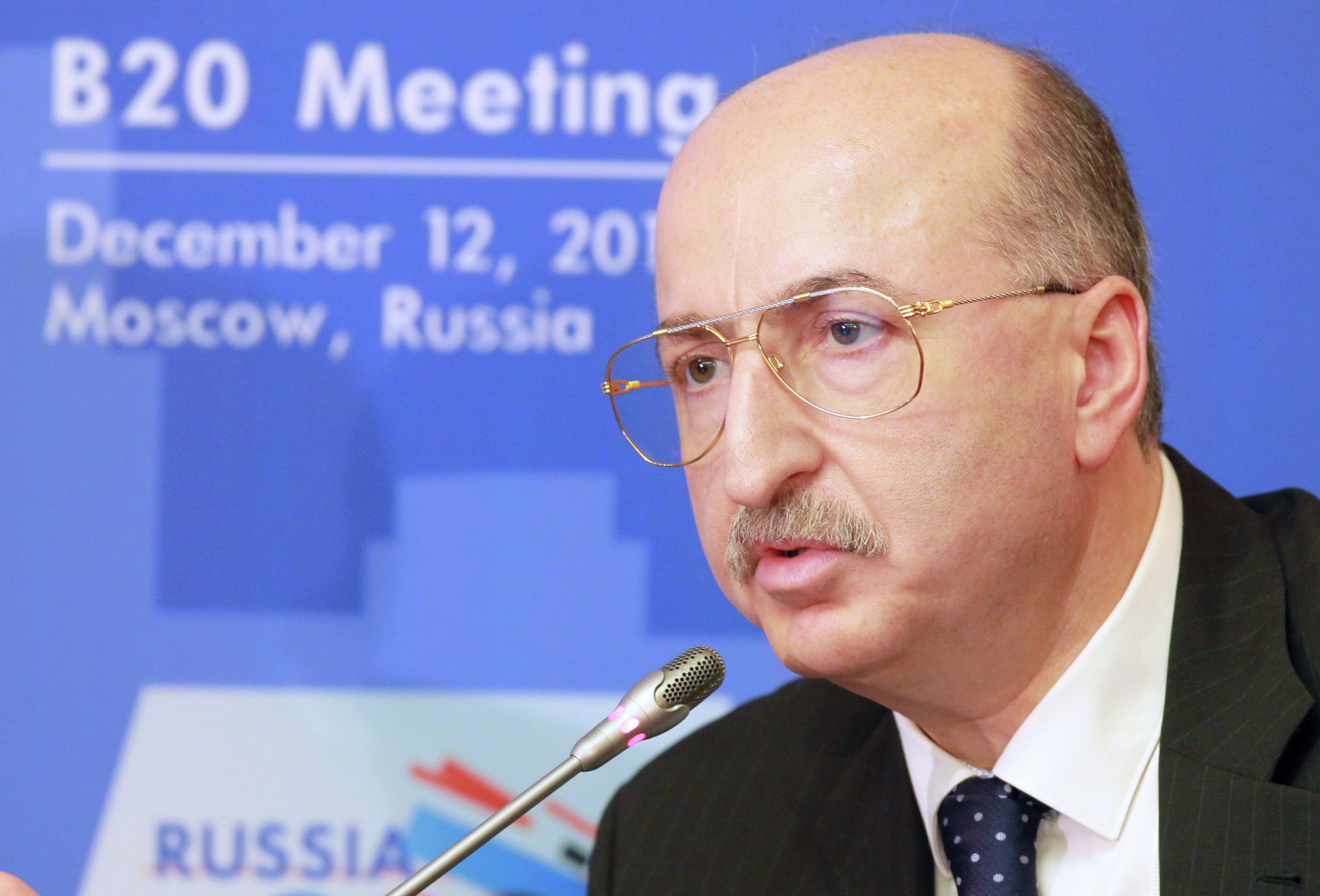
- Born: 2 March 1957 (age 69); Tbilisi, Georgian SSR
- Citizenship: Sweden
- Organization(s): Orion Heritage Co, Ltd, President
- Awards: Order of Merit of the Italian Republic (Officer)

David Mikhaylovich Yakobashvili (Russian: Давид Михайлович Якобашвили Georgian: დავით მიხეილის ძე იაკობაშვილი, sometimes spelled Iakobaсhvili) is one of the founders of the largest Russian companies – JSC Wimm-Bill-Dann – the manufacturer of dairy products, juices and beverages. In 2001 - 2010 he held the position of the Chairman of the Board of Directors of this company. In 2010 David Yakobashvili together with shareholders sold the biggest Russian food producer Wimm-Bill-Dann (WBD) to US PepsiCo. For his 10.5% stake in the company, Yakobashvili received more than US$600m.

Yakobashvili was the vice-president of the Russian Union of Industrialists and Entrepreneurs (the president is Alexander Shokhin), an independent director of AFK Sistema PAO (Vladimir Yevtushenkov). In 2022 Yakobashvili left the Bureau of the Board and the Board of the Russian Union of Industrialists and Entrepreneurs and resigned from the Board of Directors of AFK Sistema PAO. Yakobashvili is president of the Russian-American Business Council, member of the Сonsumer Мarket Development Council of the CCI RF, member of the Bureau of the Presidium of the Russian Jewish Congress, president of Orion Heritage Co, Ltd (private museum "Collection" in Moscow, Russia). In 2013 he was elected a co-chair of the B20 Task Force "Job creation, employment and investment in human capital". In 2013, he joined the Presidential International Council of the New York University (NYU).

== Awards ==
David Yakobashvili is awarded a Medal "In Commemoration of the 850th Anniversary of Moscow", Gratitude of the Government of the Russian Federation for active participation in the implementation of objectives of domestic economy modernization as well as a Pro Merito Medal of the Council of Europe. He was given the status of "The Men of the Year 2001" (Russian Biography Institute), "Person of the Year 2002" (Rosbuisinessconsulting) and "Entrepreneur of the Year 2003" (Ernst & Young). In 2008, he was given a commemorative award for contribution to the corporate management development and was named the best Chairman of Board of Directors (Association of Independent Directors). In 2012, he was given an award from "Kommersant" publishing house in two categories at once: "Success" and "Choice of the Audience". In 2013 he won appreciation from the Administration of the President of the Russian Federation for active participation in preparing and holding a meeting of Heads of Governments of B20.

== Net worth ==
In the 2014 Forbes Russia ranking David Yakobashvili took #91 with his wealth at US$1.2 billion. In the 2019 Forbes Russia ranked Yakobashvili #145 with his wealth of US$0.75 billion.

Year	2012	2013	2014	2015	2016	2017	2018	2019	2020	2021
Net worth ($ bln)	0,95	0,95	1,2	0,95	0,9	0,9	0,8	0,75	0,75	0,70
Ranking number in Russia	106	118	91	102	96	120	132	145	136	173

== Wimm Bill Dann ==
The Wimm Bill Dann (WBD) company was established in 1992 by Sergei Plastinin (his daughter Kira Plastinina) and Mikhail Dubinin. The business began with a leased juice bottling line and a loan of US$50 thousand. Plastinin and Dubinin invited David Yakobashvili. Together with other partners, they leased a juice bottling line at the Lianozovsky Dairy Plant. The first name for the juices was given the name of the company itself: the word "Wimm Bill Dann" was coined in assonance with the English "Wimbledon". Developing the western theme, the founders of the company in 1994 came up with the brand "J7" (English Seven Juices), and a year later WBD bought the shares of the Lianozovsky Plant and began to produce dairy products. In 2002 the company conducted an initial public offering on the New York Stock Exchange, becoming the first Russian food company to carry out an IPO. During the placement, the company's valuation amounted to US$830 million, the largest buyer of shares was French Danone. In 2011 Wimm Bill Dann was acquired by PepsiCo Corporation for US$5.7 billion. This was the largest PepsiCo transaction outside of North America and the largest foreign investment in the non-oil market in Russia. According to media estimates, David Iakobachvili earned about US$600 million from the sale of 10% of WBD.

== GreenBooster ==
In 2013 David Yakobashvili founded and became the president of the "InOil" Research and Production Group. He is one of the developers of the multifunctional additive GreenBooster for gasoline, diesel fuel, and fuel oil. According to experts, the use of the additive results in fewer losses and enhanced efficiency of the hydrocarbon fuel combustion process. Uniform and high-quality fuel combustion increases the reliability and service life of the engine, decreases fuel consumption and reduces the emissions of harmful combustion products.

== Investments in Africa ==
In 2017 Yakobashvili, together with partners, engaged in the purchase and sale of gold, tin, tantalum, cobalt and other raw materials from Africa. At the same time, it became known that David Yakobashvili was buying shares in two companies in Africa: Tams (Rwanda) and Coproco (Democratic Republic of the Congo). In January 2017, Tams Company announced its intention to become a leading exporter of 3T Mineral ("conflict minerals"). Yakobashvili spoke about plans to invest US$200 million in the African project in 2017-2018. Experts consider the business profitable, but risky. Since 2018 Yakobashvili has been actively introducing the GreenBooster oil products into the African economies to significantly save consumers' expenses and reduce air emissions.

== Bioenergy ==
In 2011 Yakobashvili invested in "Bioenergy" Corporation, becoming its co-owner and chairman of the board of directors. The company is engaged in the extraction and processing of peat. Investments in the company amounted to US$15 million.

== Collecting and museum "Collection" ==
Yakobashvili is a well-known collector of mechanical musical instruments, clocks and caskets, Russian bronze, art silver, items of Russian and West-European Applied and Decorative Arts.

He first became interested in collecting business because of his friendship with Bill Lindvall, whom David Yakobashvili met and made friends with while working in Sweden in the 80s. Bill Lindvall turned out to be a fan of old self-playing instruments - barrel organ and organs. Fearing that after his death, his children would sell off the collection he had, Lindvall sold it to Yakobashvili on condition that he would continue his collecting business. The collection of Lindvall's musical mechanics, which he had been collecting for over 40 years, had about 460 items.

In 2018-2019 Yakobashvili opened the museum "Collection" in the center of Moscow (Russia). The "Collection" is a new cultural and educational project. The museum's collection has more than 20 thousand exhibits divided into unique sections: mechanical musical instruments and objects, decorative arts and jewelry, fine arts, clocks, prints and records. The museum occupies a new, modern building.
