= Sergei Kukharenko =

Political scientist

Sergei Kukharenko, a Ph D in Philosophy, is a political scientist, an expert on Russian and Chinese politics, the Head of the Institute for Public Diplomacy in Asia Pacific, a member of Gorchakov foundation club of Russian foreign policy experts, a former leader of Amur Oblast regional department of the Right Cause right-wing liberal political party, and Republican Party of Russia - People's Freedom Party.

== Public and political activities ==
From 2004 till 2004 Sergei Kukharenko worked as an instructor of Stanford University Initiative on distant learning program. He gave lectures on "Democracy, Development and the Rule of Law" and "Security, Civil liberties and Terrorism", participated in international conferences organized by Stanford University and visited Stanford to participate in professional development seminars in 2005 and 2007.

In 2008 was elected as the head of the Civilian Power political party. After the unification of the Union of Right Forces, Civilian Power, and Democratic Party of Russia into "Right Cause", he was elected as the leader of the newly established party.

In 2008 he was elected as the head of Amur regional department of "Right Cause" political party.

In 2010 Sergei Kukharenko became one of the founders and the member of the presidium of interregional organization "People's Anticorruption Movement".

For a short period of time, from 2012 till 2013, Sergei Kukharenko was a leader of Amur regional department of the Party of People's Freedom. He took part in the establishment of the newly created party and managed to unite democratic leaders in Amur region and make them join the party.

In the 2013–2014 academic year Sergei worked as a visiting professor at Bemidji State University (US, Minnesota) teaching Russian politics, Russian culture and International relations courses. From 2015, Sergei Kukharenko is heading the Institute for Public Diplomacy in Asia-Pacific.

== International activities ==
Since 2008 Sergei Kukharenko has been working on establishment and development of Russian language and cultural centers in the Far-East of China. With the financial support of "Russian world" foundation he managed to establish 5 Russian language and cultural centers in China, particularly at Changchun University, Harbin Normal University, Harbin University, Daqing Normal Institute and Heihe University. Sergey Kukharenko worked out a program to develop the work of the centers.

During the 2013–2014 academic year, Sergei Kukharenko worked at Bemidji State University (US, Minnesota) as a visiting professor, teaching 'Russian politics', Russian culture' and 'Travel abroad' courses. He also conducted several researches and gave public lectures during his work at the US.
