= Wimm-Bill-Dann Foods =

Russian dairy and soft drink company

Wimm Bill Dann Foods
- Type: Subsidiary
- Industry: Dairy
- Founded: 1992; 34 years ago
- Headquarters: Moscow, Russia,
- Key people: Toby Denis Maher (chairman of the management board); Dmitry A. Anisimov (CFO); Vera V. Eliseeva (Head of Human Resources)
- Products: Milk, yogurts, sour creams, fruit juices
- Revenue: ▼US$2.18 billion (2009)
- Operating income: ▼US$0.201 billion (2009)
- Net income: ▼US$0.117 billion (2009)
- Total assets: ▼US$1.49 billion (2009)
- Total equity: ▲US$0.703 billion (2009)
- Number of employees: 18,485
- Parent: PepsiCo

Wimm Bill Dann Foods (Russian: Вимм-Билль-Данн) is one of Europe's largest dairy products companies. WBD produces yogurt, milk, flavored milk, fruit juices, and other soft drinks. It holds a 34% share in all dairy products in Russia, and a 20% share of the fruit drink market.

Wimm Bill Dann has 30 production sites in 16 cities. The "About our Company" page on the website describes the company's close ties to Russia's cattle and dairy farms. The company's management is both Russian and non-Russian. According to former Plant Manager Vladimir Tambov, the mascot is a mouse.

== History ==
The company was established in 1992 by Sergei Plastinin (the father of fashion designer Kira Plastinina) and Mikhail Dubinin. The business began with a leased juice bottling line and a loan of US$ 50.000. Plastinin and Dubinin invited David Iakobachvili. Together with other partners, they leased a juice bottling line at the Lianozovsky Dairy Plant. The first name for the juices was given the name of the company itself: the word "Wimm Bill Dann" was coined in assonance with the English "Wimbledon". The company was one of the first Russian producers of fruit juice under the "J7" brand.

In response to a decline in the census of dairy cattle in Russia, the company spent US$7 mm in 1999 to modernize its suppliers' milking and refrigeration equipment.

The company listed on the New York Stock Exchange in 2002.

In 2003, Wimm-Bill-Dann acquired a factory manufacturing the Essentuki mineral water. The company had been producing the «Essentuki-17» «Essentuki-4» and brands of mineral water until 2018, when it the plant to the joint-stock company «Holding-Aqua».

Danone considered a takeover of Wimm-Bill-Dann around the same year. It at one time had an 18% stake in the company, which it sold in October 2010.

=== PepsiCo acquisition ===
On 2 December 2010, PepsiCo agreed to buy Wimm-Bill-Dann. During the first stage PepsiCo bought 66% of Wimm-Bill-Dann for $3.8 billion. The purchase was one of the biggest foreign investments yet seen in Russia outside the energy industry. Following the acquisition, the company delisted its stock from the New York Stock Exchange in 2011. The deal was completed in several stages entirely (100%) by December 2011 through a multi-stage acquisition from founding shareholders, management and free float. The acquisition was the second-largest in PepsiCo history (after its earlier acquisition of Quaker Oats).

Months following its acquisition of the company, PepsiCo was alerted of possible accounting improprieties by an anonymous whistle-blower. PepsiCo hired the law firm of Gibson, Dunn & Crutcher to conduct an investigation of Wimm Bill Dann, which revealed widespread compliance issues including potential Foreign Corrupt Practices Act violations. PepsiCo general counsel Maura Smith commissioned a memo which blamed PepsiCo's European management and compliance reporting systems for previously overlooking these improprieties, but her employment ended for undisclosed reasons before the memo was finalized. Following these events, the Securities and Exchange Commission began an investigation as to whether Smith was fired in retaliation for her actions.

== Operation ==
Wimm-Bill-Dann owned 36 manufacturing enterprises producing dairy products, juices and mineral water, as well as sales centers in more than 25 cities in Russia and CIS countries. The main trademarks are: "J-7", "100% Gold Premium", "Favorite garden"("Любимый сад"), "House in a village"("Домик в деревне"), "Jolly Milkman"("Веселый Молочник"), "Agousha", in total over 1000 names of dairy products and more than 150 names of juices, fruit nectars, non-carbonated drinks.

The amount of the authorized capital of the WBD is 4,331,860.00 ₽.

In 2023 the company's profit is — 8 825 579 000 rubles revenue in 2023 — 128 863 066 000 rubles.

== Controversies ==
In October-November 2016, the company was accused of using the milk of FMD-infected cows in the production of its dairy products. Following the requirements of the Rospotrebnadzor, Wimm Bill Dann withdrew its products from the market. The company denied the accusations but conducted formal investigations.

== Owners and management ==
CEO - Mikhailov Maxim Viktorovich

As of the end of 2011, the main owner of JSC "Wimm-Bill-Dann" was JSC "Wimm-Bill-Dann food products" (the share of participation in the authorized capital is 98.41%). Wimm-Bill-Dann Food is 100% owned by Pepsi-Cola (Bermuda) Limited (located in Bermuda).

== See also ==
- Lebedyansky JSC, Russian fruit juice producer
- Food industry of Russia
