= Kira Plastinina =

Russian fashion designer and entrepreneur

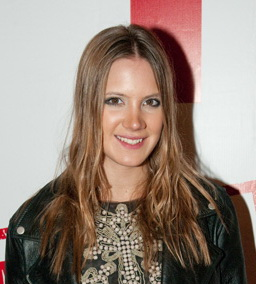
- Born: Moscow, Russia
- Education: Southern Methodist University, BA Columbia Business School, MBA
- Label: Kira Plastinina LUBLU Kira Plastinina
- Awards: Glamour Magazine Russia: Breakthrough of the Year (2007) Glamour Magazine Russia: Designer of the Year (2008, 2014)

Kira Plastinina (Russian: Ки́ра Серге́евна Пласти́нина) is a Russian fashion designer and entrepreneur. Her brand was sold through a now defunct chain of eponymous retail stores in Russia, Ukraine, Kazakhstan, Belarus, China, Philippines and Armenia.

Plastinina was born in Moscow. Her father, Sergei Plastinin, founded Wimm-Bill-Dann Foods OJSC in 1992 and served as its chief executive officer until April 3, 2006. In 2007, the first Kira Plastinina store opened in Moscow, Plastinina introduced her first collection and became one of the youngest fashion designers in the world. Since then, the company has opened over 300 stores in Russia and CIS. In 2008, the company made an unsuccessful attempt to enter the U.S. market. The U.S. entity eventually filed for bankruptcy.

Throughout her career, Plastinina has presented her fashion collections during Rome, Milan, New York and Moscow fashion weeks. Her brand has been worn by many celebrities including Paris Hilton, Lindsay Lohan, Georgia May Jagger, Karlie Kloss, Rowan Blanchard, Lyndsy Fonseca, Victoria Justice, and many others. Plastinina is close friends with Debby Ryan.

== Social boycott ==
"Kira Plastinina" shop chain became an object of Russian products boycott in the aftermath of the Russian annexation of Crimea.
