= Boris Titov =

Russian politician and businessman

- Борис Титов
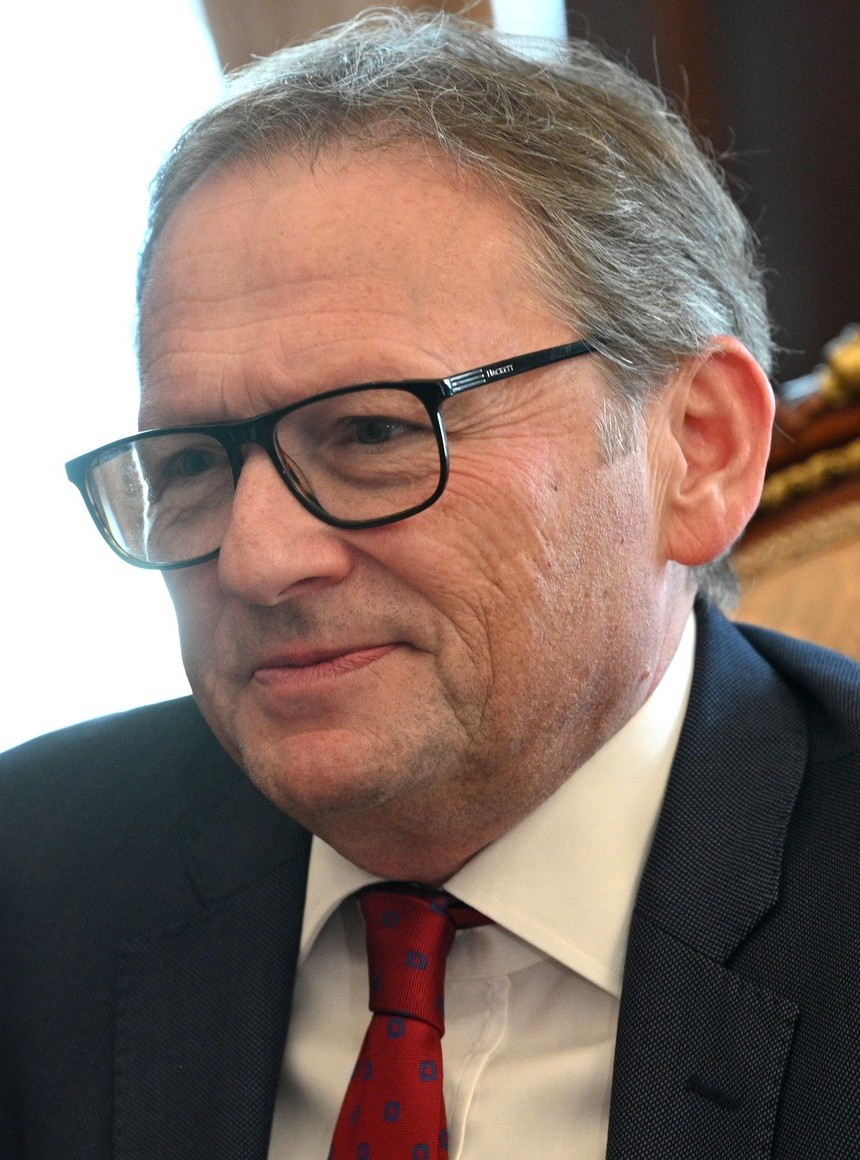
- Titov in 2021

Special Presidential Envoy for Relations with International Organizations to Achieve Sustainable Development Goals
- Incumbent
- Assumed office 16 June 2024
- President: Vladimir Putin
- Preceded by: Anatoly Chubais

Presidential Commissioner for Entrepreneurs’ Rights
- In office 22 June 2012 – 22 June 2022
- President: Vladimir Putin

Leader of the Party of Growth
- In office 26 March 2016 – 19 April 2024
- Preceded by: Himself (as the leader of the Right Cause party)
- Succeeded by: Party merging into New People

Leader of Right Cause
- In office 29 February 2016 – 26 March 2016
- Preceded by: Vyacheslav Maratkanov
- Succeeded by: Himself (as the leader of the Party of Growth)

Personal details
- Born: Boris Yuryevich Titov; 24 December 1960 (age 65) Moscow, Soviet Union
- Party: New People (since 2024)
- Other political affiliations: United Russia (2007–08); Civilian Power (2008); Right Cause (2008–11, 2016); Party of Growth (2016–24); People's Front (since 2011)
- Spouse: Elena Titova
- Children: 2
- Education: Moscow State Institute of International Relations
- Awards: Order of Honour; Medal of the Order "For Merit to the Fatherland", 1st class National Order of the Legion of Honour; Russian Presidential Letter of Gratitude

Military service
- Rank: Senior lieutenant

Boris Yuryevich Titov (Russian: Борис Юрьевич Титов; born 24 December 1960) is a Russian politician and businessman serving as the Special Presidential Envoy for Relations with International Organizations to Achieve Sustainable Development Goals since 2024. He was known as the presidential commissioner for entrepreneurs' rights from 2012 to 2022. Titov has led the Party of Growth, previously known as Right Cause, since February 2016.

In the 2018 presidential election, Titov ran as a candidate, finishing sixth place with 0.76% of the vote.

== Life and career ==
Titov graduated from the Faculty of Economics at the Moscow State Institute of International Relations in 1983. He was appointed Head of the Department of Chemistry of the joint Soviet-Dutch enterprise Urals in 1989. In 1991, he and his partners created their own company, Solvalub. They bought London-based solvents and lubricants, with which they collaborated for a project involving Urals and the VO Soviet Oil Export (Russian: Союзнефтеэкспорт, romanized: Soyuznyeftexport, lit. '[Soviet] Union oil export'). He became executive director of the SVL Group companies. He was also mentioned in the mainstream media as the chairman of the board of the group. Later, the company turned into an investment and trading group, operating in the oil market, agro- and petrochemicals, and liquefied gases. The company very quickly became involved in refinancing exports from Russia, the organization of project financing, and investments in production and transportation projects. Titov, who is the majority owner of Solvalub, was valued at $2 billion in 2008.

On 26 June 2012, the board of directors of Abrau-Durso, a winery owned by Titov, voted to terminate Titov's authority as the director of the company, in connection with his transfer to the civil service and election to the board of directors.

=== Social activity ===
In 2000, he was elected to be a member of the board and vice-president of the Russian Union of Industrialists and Entrepreneurs.

In 2003, he became co-chair, and in May 2004, the chairman of the all-Russian Business Russia public organization. In this capacity, he criticized the rigid financial policies of the Minister of Finance Alexei Kudrin. He insisted on the need to increase domestic production of goods, stimulate demand, attract investments, and change tax cuts and the refinancing rate of the Central Bank.

As the leader of Business Russia, Boris Titov became a member of a number of state and public structures. He became a member of the Council for Implementation of Priority National Projects and Demographic Policy and Promotion of Civil Society Institutions and Human Rights Council under the president of the Russian Federation, a member of the Council on Competitiveness and Entrepreneurship at the Russian government and the government Commission on the Development of Industry, Technology and Transport. He served as chairman of the Russian side of the Russian-Chinese Business Council, chairman of the non-commercial partnership Gas Market Coordinator and member of the Presidium of the National Council on Corporate Governance.

In 2005–2008, Titov was a member of the Civic Chamber of the Russian Federation.

=== Political activity ===
In October 2007, he was elected a member of the Supreme Council of United Russia.

In 2008, he headed the Supreme Council of the party Civilian Power and began to create a new right-wing party in Russia. In November of the same year, the Democratic Party of Russia, Civilian Power, and the Union of Right Forces were disbanded and founded a new party Right Cause. Congress approved its three co-chairs. They were the former deputy chairman of the Union of Right Forces Leonid Gozman, a journalist Georgy Bovt, and Titov. A few days later, the decision of X Congress of United Russia was to prematurely terminate Titov's powers as a member of the Supreme Council of the party.

On 22 June 2012, a decree by the Russian president Vladimir Putin authorized Titov to be the Commissioner for the Protection of the Rights of Entrepreneurs in Russia.

On 29 February 2016, at the VII Congress of the Right Cause party, he was elected its chairman, saying the change of political course of the party, at the "party business" and its re-branding.

== 2018 presidential campaign ==
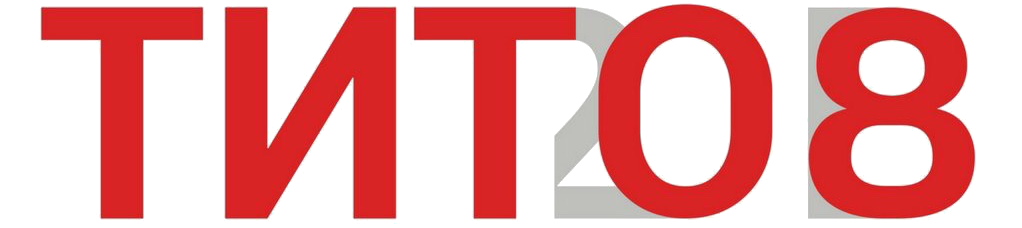
Titov 2018 logo

On 26 November 2017, Boris Titov announced his intention to run for president in the 2018 election.

Titov was officially nominated by his party on 21 December. He submitted the documents required for registration to the CEC the next day. Titov's documents were approved by the CEC on 25 December, which meant that he could begin collecting signatures. A party spokesman commented that the collection of signatures in support of Titov would begin early in January 2018.

According to Titov, the main purpose of his participation in the election was to promote the party's Growth Strategy economic program, which was prepared by the Stolypin Club and presented to President Vladimir Putin in May 2017. During the campaign Titov and his team intend to travel around the country to promote the program.

== Personal life ==
In 2017, his son Pavel along with First Deputy Prime Minister Igor Shuvalov, VEB chairman Sergei Gorkov and Sberbank chairman German Gref, were strong supporters of cryptocurrencies. Since January 2022, Pavel Titov's wife Ksenia Titova (Russian: Ксения Титова) and Ruslan Romantsev (Russian: Руслан Романцев) as CEO are heading Abrau Cosmetics which is a Kubanbytkhim LLC based (Russian: база ООО «Кубаньбытхим») Novorossiysk located division of the Abrau-Durso holding.
