= Alexey Nechayev =

Russian politician and entrepreneur (born 1966)

Alexey Nechayev MP
- Алексей Нечаев
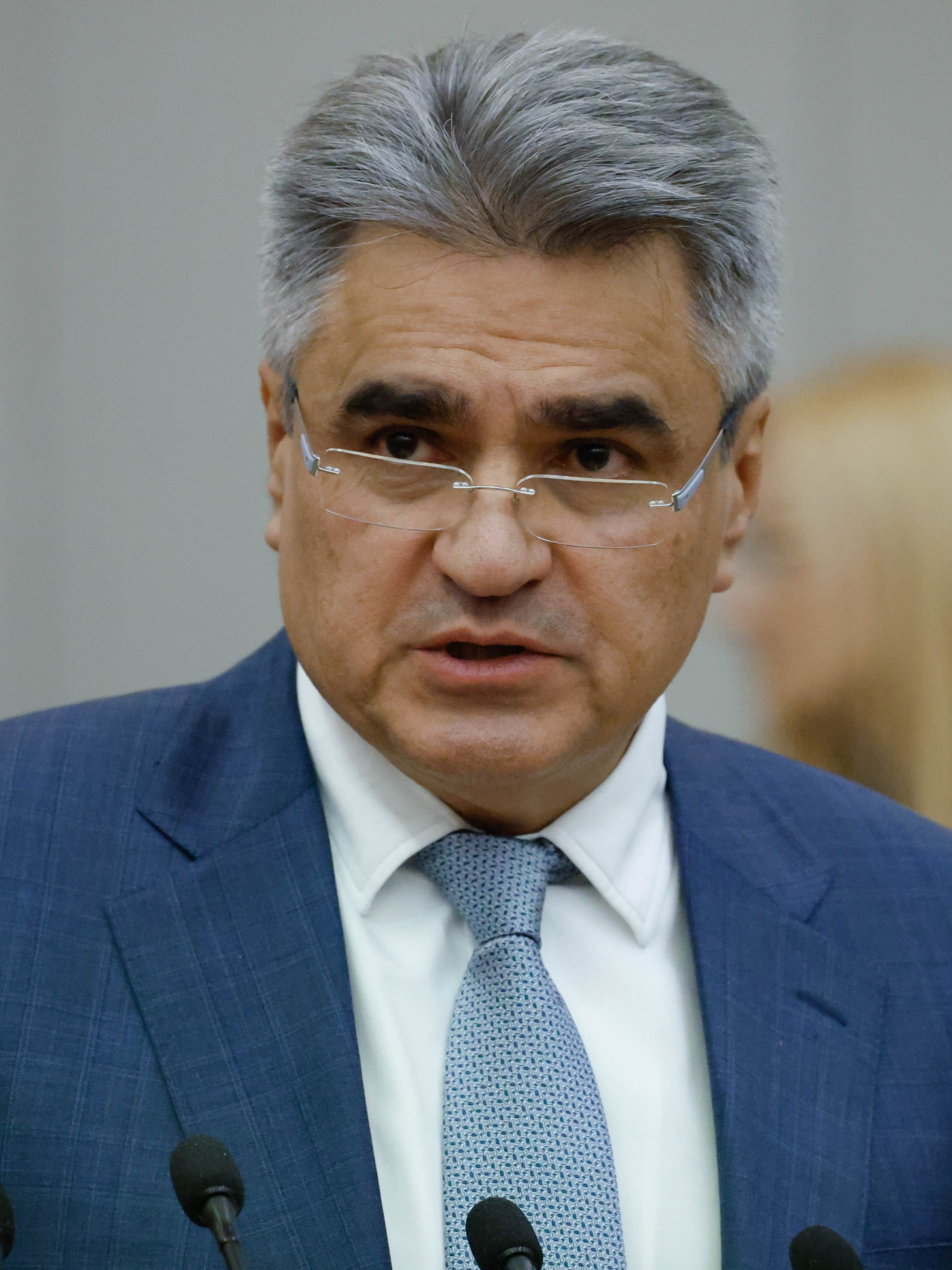
- Nechayev in 2026

Leader of New People
- Incumbent
- Assumed office 8 August 2020
- Preceded by: Irena Lukyanova

Parliamentary leader of New People in the State Duma
- Incumbent
- Assumed office 12 October 2021

Member of the State Duma
- Incumbent
- Assumed office 12 October 2021
- Constituency: Party-list (2021–present)

Personal details
- Born: 30 August 1966 (age 59) Moscow, RSFSR, USSR
- Party: New People (2020–present)
- Other political affiliations: Komsomol (1983–1988); All-Russia People's Front (2019–2021)
- Education: Moscow State University
- Occupation: Politician, entrepreneur
- Profession: Lawyer
- Awards: Badge of Distinction "For Mentoring"

Alexey Gennadievich Nechayev (Russian: Алексей Геннадьевич Нечаев; born 30 August 1966) is a Russian entrepreneur and politician, president of the Russian cosmetics company Faberlic, a member of the All-Russia People's Front, and chairman of the New People political party since 8 August 2020.

== Biography ==
Alexey Nechaev was born in Moscow on 30 August 1966. He is the only child in the family. His mother Yelena Vasilyevna Binat (Greek by nationality) is a school teacher. Father Gennadiy Nikolaevich Nechayev – an atomic engineer by his first education, a graduate of the MEPhI, worked at the plant as the head of the laboratory for methods of protection and control of reactors; later, through the party line, he was nominated for a second higher education at the Academy of Foreign Trade, mastered several foreign languages, and often traveled abroad.

From 1983 to 1988, Alexey Nechaev studied at Moscow State University at the Faculty of Law, was a member of the Komsomol. He was not called up for military service (unlike most students born in the second half of the 1960s). After the first year he worked as a counselor in the pioneer camp of Moscow State University "Youth". In 1985, he passed sailing practice in the pioneer flotilla "Caravella", organized by Vladislav Krapivin. He founded the movement of different-age groups "Dawn", in which extracurricular work with children was carried out. Children went on sailing trips and were engaged in hand-to-hand combat and fencing.

== Entrepreneurial activity ==
In 1990, he started doing business – first selling newspapers and books in the subway passages. Together with partners, he establishes the publishing house of children's literature "Master". The first Russian edition of The Chronicles of Narnia was published by the publishing house. From 1996 to 1997 he worked on the stock market in Ukraine.

In 1997, Nechaev created and headed the company to produce and trade cosmetics "Russian Line". In the same year, Nechaev and his partner Alexander Davankov acquired a patent for the use of aquaftem. This substance became the basis for the products of "Russian Line", and subsequently Faberlic. For the project, work in the format of direct sales was chosen. Since its inception, Nechayev has been and remains the company's sole leader. At the initial stage, he invested $2 million of his own funds in the project and took another $1 million for the company's development from friends.

In 2001, in connection with entering the international markets, it was rebranded and the company's name was changed to Faberlic. A little earlier, in 2000, due to entering foreign markets, a new line of products began to be developed on the initiative of partners. Then Alexey Nechaev and Alexander Davankov made a radical restructuring of the distribution system, and a network of single-brand Beauty Cafe stores was launched, and they began to sell Faberlic products.

The company is a leader in export and one of the largest Russian manufacturers of hygiene and cosmetics. One of the three market leaders among companies specializing in direct sales in Russia, and one of the five leaders of Russia's perfumery and cosmetic market. The network of distribution partners, Faberlic, is one million people in Russia. In addition to Russia, the company operates in 40 more countries worldwide and is one of the 50 largest global companies specializing in direct sales. Since 2006, Faberlic has been included in the world rating of the largest cosmetic companies of the Women's Wear Daily publication, where it is the only representative of Russia. In 2015, the company was ranked 3rd on the list of the fastest-growing cosmetics companies compiled by WWD.

By 2017, Faberlic has become the largest Russian company in the direct sales market and one of the largest Russian cosmetics manufacturers.

Alexey Nechayev mentors a number of Faberlic innovative projects.

== Social activity ==
From 2004 to 2007 – Member of the Council for Competitiveness and Entrepreneurship under the Government of the Russian Federation.

In 2010, after attending the Seliger forum, together with the federal commissioner of the Nashi youth movement Marina Zademidkova, created the "Green movement of Russia "ECA ", becoming the main sponsor of the project. The movement announced and implemented a program to plant 10 million trees in wildfire-affected and ecologically disadvantaged regions.

In 2012, Alexey Nechaev founded the Captains educational program, which opened in 13 regions of the country. He then created the Captains Аamily Charitable Foundation. With the support of this fund on the basis of the Institute of Management and Socio-Economic Planning of the Plekhanov Russian University of Economics, the business faculty "Captains" was created. In 2016, the educational program "Captains" became a laureate of the "Foundation of Growth-2016" award as "The best educational project in the field of entrepreneurship". Also "Captains" were recognized as the 7th largest student accelerator in the world.

In 2019, he joined the ONF, a member of the central headquarters of the organization.

Supports, like the New People (political party) party created by him, for the legalization of the purchase from conscription into the Armed Forces, as well as for expanding the possibilities of an alternative civilian service.

== Political activity ==
In the winter of 2020, Nechayev announced the creation of a new political party – New People.

In April 2020, the Russian Ministry of Justice officially registered the party. On 8 August 2020, at the second congress of the party, Nechaev was elected its chairman. Nechayev is a member of the Central Council of the All-Russia People's Front.

On September 19, 2021, he was elected a deputy of the State Duma of the Federal Assembly of the Russian Federation of the 8th convocation. On October 11, 2021, he was elected leader of the New People faction in the State Duma of the Federal Assembly of the Russian Federation of the 8th convocation.

In 2023, he co-authored a law banning gender transition.

On March 19, 2025, he was re-elected chairman of the New People party.

== Family ==
Alexey Nechayev in his second marriage with Elena Nechayeva. Alexey has five children – three daughters and two sons. From the first marriage – the eldest daughter Darya and son Antoniy. From the second marriage with Elena Nechayeva, three children – Sofiya, Yegor and Maria – these children were born at home.

== Income ==
In 2020, according to a report published on the Central Election Commission website, Alexey Nechayev earned 4.4 billion rubles and took third place among the candidates for deputies with the highest income.

== Awards ==
- Badge of Distinction "For Mentoring" (25 October 2018) — for merits in the professional development of young specialists and active mentoring.
