= Russian Journal of Communication =

- Discipline: Communication studies
- Language: English
- Edited by: Igor Klyukanov

Publication details
- Publisher: Taylor & Francis
- Frequency: Triannual

Standard abbreviations
- ISO 4: Russ. J. Commun.

Indexing
- ISSN: 1940-9419

Links
- Journal homepage

The Russian Journal of Communication is an English-language, scholarly, peer-reviewed journal which covers topics related to journalism, public relations, film, and political communications in or involving Russia. Published by Taylor & Francis, it is indexed in Scopus. Its editor is Igor Klyukanov of Eastern Washington University and the journal is sponsored by the Russian Communication Association.
