= Viktor Zvagelsky =

Russian politician

- Виктор Звагельский
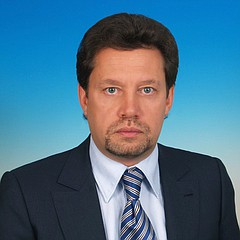

Personal details
- Born: 30 July 1963 (age 63) Moscow, Soviet Union
- Party: United Russia
- Website: http://www.zvagelskiy.ru/about

Viktor Friedrichovich Zvagelsky (Russian: Виктор Фридрихович Звагельский; born on 30 July 1963 in Moscow) is a Russian politician. He received his higher education at the Civil Engineering Institute named after V. V. Kuibyshev. After graduating from the institute he made his way up from engineer to deputy head at Glavmosvodokanal.

== Businessman ==
Since 1992, he has been actively engaged in the spirit drinks business and food industry. In 2005–2007, he was deputy CEO of Federal Unitary Enterprise Rosspirtprom, headquartered in Moscow. In 2007, he was elected to the State Duma of the fifth convocation from the regional group No.80, Moscow. In 2011, he was elected to the State Duma of the sixth convocation.

He is the co-founder and head of Yat, Podmoskovnye Vechera trade house, and Krasnaya Zvezda group of companies engaged in the production and marketing of vodka.

== Deputy of the State Duma of the fifth convocation ==
In the State Duma of the fifth convocation, Zvagelsky was a member of the committee on economic policy, innovative development, and entrepreneurship. In the next convocation he took a more prominent position of deputy chairman of the committee.
