= Egor Prosvirnin =

Russian opinion journalist (1986–2021)

- Егор Просвирнин
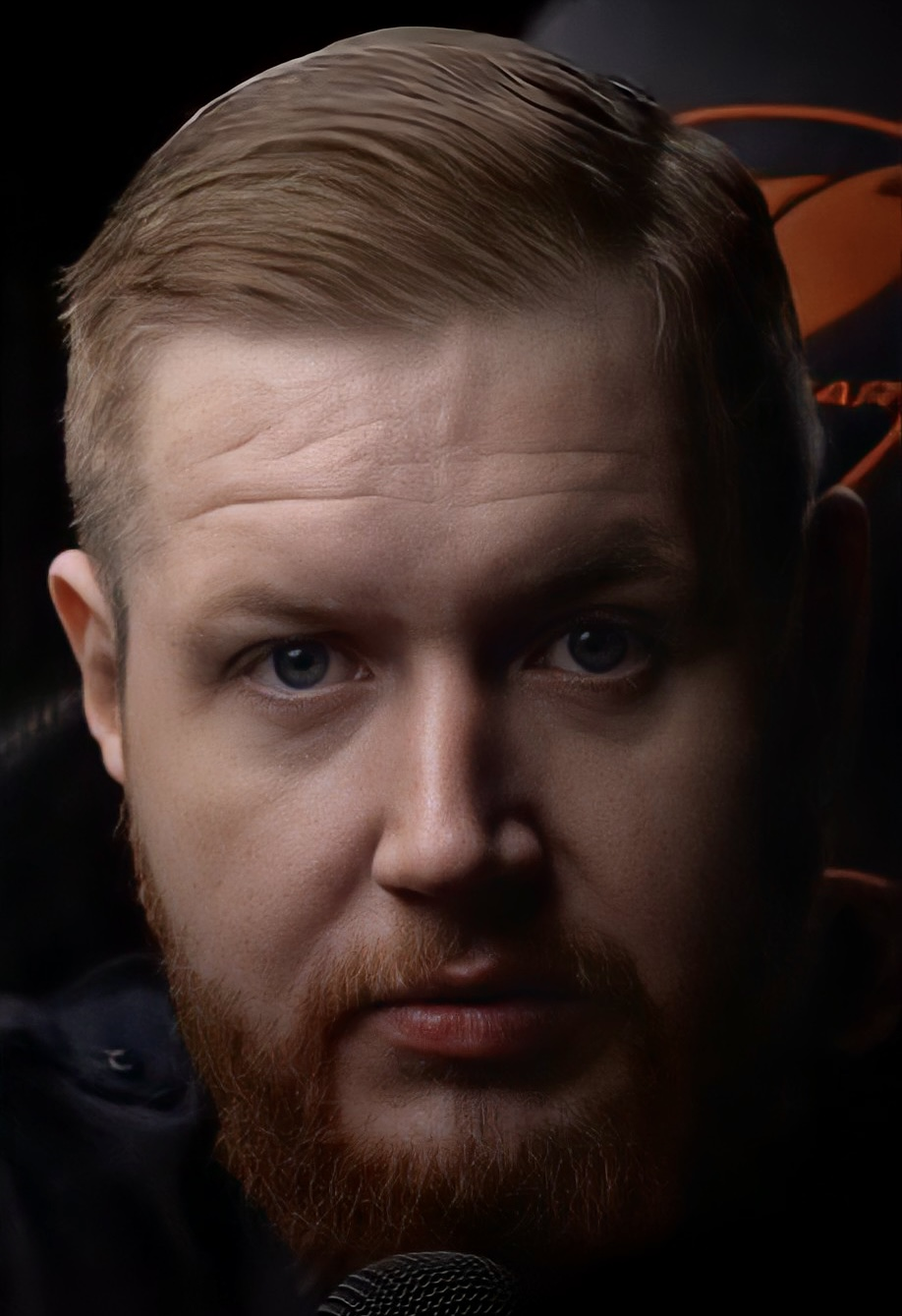
- Prosvirnin in 2021
- Born: 3 April 1986; Vladivostok, Russian SFSR, Soviet Union
- Died: 27 December 2021 (aged 35); Moscow, Russia
- Other name: Egor Pogrom
- Citizenship: Russia
- Education: Russian State University for the Humanities (did not graduate)
- Occupations: Opinion journalist; columnist; political commentator; political activist; editor
- Years active: 2008–2021
- Known for: Founding editor-in-chief of the online Russian nationalist outlet Sputnik and Pogrom

Egor Aleksandrovich Prosvirnin (Russian: Егор Александрович Просвирнин; 3 April 1986 – 27 December 2021), also known by his pen name Egor Pogrom (Russian: Егор Погром) was a Russian right-wing opinion journalist, political commentator and activist, best known as the founding editor-in-chief of the online outlet Sputnik and Pogrom, which was active from 2012 to 2018. He began his writing career in video game magazines and on the blogging platform LiveJournal before launching Sputnik and Pogrom in 2012, where he published articles on history, politics, and culture. Through his work in the 2010s, Prosvirnin became a prominent voice within Russia's nationalist and national-democratic movements, later shifting toward monarchist views.

A committed nationalist who was frequently critical of many state initiatives, Prosvirnin became, from 2014 onward, one of the most ardent supporters of Russia's annexation of Crimea and of comprehensive Russian backing for the separatist Donetsk People's Republic and Luhansk People's Republic in eastern Ukraine. However, in 2015, a criminal investigation was launched over a number of extremist statements published on the Sputnik and Pogrom website, Prosvirnin was named as a witness in the case. In 2017, the site was blocked within Russia, and the publication was shuttered for good in 2018. Following the closure of Sputnik and Pogrom, Prosvirnin continued his career as a blogger and commentator, hosting livestreams on his YouTube channel Czar where he discussed major socio-political issues. On 27 December 2021, Prosvirnin died after falling from the balcony of an apartment building in Moscow.

In the wake of his death, a number of authors described him as one of the most talented Russian opinion journalists of the 2010s, praising the literary craft and stylistic flair of his prose, even as assessments of his ideological positions remained sharply divided.

== Biography ==
=== Early years ===
Egor Prosvirnin was born in Vladivostok. His mother was a theater artist and set designer, while his father, was a theater actor and stage director.

Prosvirnin described himself as "a bookish homeboy who was given a thick children's encyclopedia at the age of seven". After his family moved to Reutov, he enrolled in the Philological Faculty of the Russian State University for the Humanities but did not graduate, what he later claimed he never regretted. He began building his journalism career by contributing to various magazines on a wide range of topics, including video game coverage. His work appeared in gaming publications such as Strana Igr, Igromania, PC Gamer, and others. He said he was raised on the "elitist" magazine Game.EXE, which he believed stood out for publishing articles on culture and politics and for its disdain for mainstream tastes.

In 2008, he became the editor-in-chief of the inflight magazine for the airline Aeroflot, where he commissioned journalist Oleg Kashin to conduct interviews with decorated Russian pilots and famous passengers (such as opera singer Galina Vishnevskaya), as well as to write pieces on the history of various professions and trades. He ran a popular LiveJournal blog under the handle nomina_obscura, contributed to Russian Journal, Literaturnaya gazeta, and Kommersant, and published a science fiction novel online titled Georges Dunaev (2006). Overall, Prosvirnin spoke negatively about his time working in gaming media, hinting at rigid censorship.

An active blogger on LiveJournal, Prosvirnin gained a reputation in the mid-2000s for writing whose tone and subject matter largely foreshadowed the future content of Sputnik and Pogrom. Notably, Prosvirnin's LiveJournal blog was once promoted by Anton Nossik, a pioneer of Runet, who praised it for having "original thoughts, a solid grasp of the material, a decent sense of humor, and fair winds".

Prosvirnin identified himself as part of the Moscow middle class that had "traded political rights to the authorities in exchange for prosperity", though at some point he was forced to reassess his views on life. On 13 April 2007, Prosvirnin took part in the Dissenters' March organized by Eduard Limonov's The Other Russia party and was detained (among 250 others arrested that day). In 2011, he participated in the mass protests on Bolotnaya Square in Moscow, standing amid a crowd he described as "skinheads". In 2012, he made his first and only appearance at the Russian march in Lyublino, declaring a year later that he did not support the event and would not participate again. However, according to politician Dmitry Demushkin, despite Prosvirnin's refusal to attend, he assisted in creating promotional materials (including graphics) for the Russian march.

=== Sputnik and Pogrom ===
On 28 April 2012, Prosvirnin created a group called Sputnik and Pogrom on the Russian social network VKontakte, and in 2013 he launched the official website of the same name. He maintained, however, that the project had actually begun as a LiveJournal blog before evolving into a VKontakte community and eventually a full-fledged website. The site's emergence was tied to the protest movement of that era, a time of active public debate in the country, marked by "rallies and hopes for imminent change", which Prosvirnin himself supported. The name combines two of the most recognizable Russian loanwords in other languages, representing what he saw as "the two extremes of the Russian people": Sputnik as the "triumph of reason", and Pogrom as the "unleashing of the elemental popular spirit". Prosvirnin described the journal's ideology as "intellectual nationalism" that appealed not to raw emotion but to reason, drawing on Russian intellectual tradition as well as constitutional, social, and political concepts from various countries around the world.

Prosvirnin served as editor-in-chief of Sputnik and Pogrom. The site featured both his satirical feuilletons, "gushing with fury and audacious jokes", and serious essays on history, music, and literature. Particularly popular were stories recounting feats of the Russian military (for example, Colonel Karyagin's campaign, the siege of Osowiec Fortress, and the manhunt for Vasily Chapayev). Prosvirnin's team included philosophy graduates and employees from leading Moscow studios (including some citizens of European Union countries). Contributors to Sputnik and Pogrom at various times also included journalist Oleg Kashin, philosopher Konstantin Krylov, commentator Yegor Kholmogorov, and activist Maria Butina.

In 2013, the outlet's core readership consisted of middle-class individuals aged 25 to 30 who identified with neither liberalism nor communism. By 2017, the audience had shifted primarily toward educated urban youth. Prosvirnin eschewed populist rhetoric, viewing this as a key distinction between his outlet and other nationalist projects, and he staunchly defended the thesis that "nationalism is an urban phenomenon". Some content on the site was behind a paywall, as Prosvirnin argued that this business model was the only way to ensure both the prosperity and the independence of journalists. Prosvirnin himself maintained subscriptions to foreign periodicals such as Foreign Policy, Foreign Affairs, and The New York Times.

As of 2013, the publication had roughly 4,000 subscribers each on Facebook and Twitter, but about five times that number on its VKontakte page. Prosvirnin's project caught the attention of mainstream media: the Russian television channel NTV aired a segment describing the project as "nationalism with a human face". In 2014, the site garnered significant interest in Ukraine, with around 70,000 monthly visits originating from Ukrainian territory. By summer of that year, the outlet had 5,000 paid subscribers. In 2017, monthly unique visitors reached 750,000, with total visits amounting to 1.5 million. A standard news article on the site would garner roughly 15,000 views.

Among those who shared articles from the outlet on social media at various times were prominent figures such as Alfred Koch, Sergey Parkhomenko, Masha Gessen, Alexei Navalny, Sergey Minaev, Anatoly Chubais, Ksenia Sobchak, and Igor Girkin. At the end of 2013, Colta.ru ranked Prosvirnin second on its list of Russia's most influential public intellectuals.

The website's visual design was highly praised by critics, and the reflections found in its articles were considered "living human thought, with all its merits and flaws", though occasionally the authors "in a fit of graphomania, would write God knows what". Prosvirnin juxtaposed photographs of Nicholas II with contemporary design and modern slogans, blending patriotic agitation with "teenage insolence". As a result, he succeeded in instilling in a generation of cultured young people an interest not only in globalization and the new ethics", but also in Russian nationalism, the Russian Empire, and monarchy. Regarding the design, Prosvirnin noted influences ranging from classicism to the aesthetics of the New Europe, but added that he had to employ the "visual language of postmodern urban youth" to tell certain stories, often laced with bitter or angry irony.

Financially, the outlet was not profitable. In 2013, Prosvirnin's total income from reader subscriptions and voluntary donations was lower than the salary of a news reporter at a "mid-level editorial office", forcing him to purchase advertising in large online communities. By 2017, ad revenue accounted for only about 10% of the site's total income. The average monthly budget was around US$10,000, and Prosvirnin paid his staff in US dollars. By his own estimation, only one out of every 1,000 visitors purchased a subscription, and the site did not receive large individual donations. In 2017, Prosvirnin planned to launch a paid comment system to sustain the site's future, although he considered comments inciting ethnic hatred unacceptable. By 2018, according to Finnish researcher Jussi Jussila, Sputnik and Pogrom had become the most popular opposition nationalist outlet on the Runet.

On 6 July 2017, the Prosecutor General's Office directed the Federal Service for Supervision of Communications, Information Technology and Mass Media to block the website Sputnik and Pogrom, accusing the outlet of promoting national and religious strife that incites extremism. Notably, the order did not specify which exact pages contained the alleged propaganda. Prosvirnin denounced the Prosecutor General's demand as unlawful, speculating that the site's closure might be tied to Vladimir Putin's presidential campaign ahead of the 2018 presidential race, a period during which pressure on certain media outlets intensified. He noted that there had been previous attempts to shut the site down. According to Prosvirnin's estimate at the time of the block, the site had enough subscriber funds to operate for another two to three months, but a steady monthly decline in subscribers threatened to slash its revenue.

Access to the site was subsequently blocked across Russia, Belarus, and Kazakhstan. The restrictions caused an immediate drop in traffic, halting a six-month period of organic audience growth achieved without any advertising spend, though in July 2018, the site's pages still registered 587,000 views. Prosvirnin explored several options for the site's future following the block, but his account with the payment platform Tinypass was soon suspended due to unresolved disputes. The closure drew criticism from Vladimir Zhirinovsky, the leader of the Liberal Democratic Party, though no public rallies were held in support of the outlet.

On 9 October 2018, the outlet was officially shuttered. Prosvirnin stated that the site had successfully fulfilled its primary mission of cultivating a community of followers who advanced the ideas of Russian nationalism. He announced intentions to launch several new projects that would carry on the legacy of Sputnik. He continued posting on social media under pen name Egor Pogrom, and he began hosting livestreams and publishing videos on his YouTube channel, Czar. A significant portion of Prosvirnin's streams focused on the history of various national movements. For instance, he conducted a three-part series examining the causes of the Rwandan genocide. He also posted videos about video games. Oleg Kashin remarked that Prosvirnin's pivot to YouTube streaming stemmed from a growing disillusionment with the written word.

=== Political repression ===
Prosvirnin was frequently accused of inciting ethnic hatred and promoting Nazism. On 22 June 2012, Sputnik and Pogrom published his article "That Endless Summer Day…" marking the anniversary of Nazi Germany's invasion of the Soviet Union. Written in a sharply anti-Soviet tone, the piece sparked significant public outcry. Prosvirnin was accused of justifying the crimes of the Third Reich against Soviet civilians, rationalizing the collaborationist Russian Liberation Army, and expressing support for Nazism. In 2013, journalist Israel Shamir publicly condemned the article in Komsomolskaya Pravda, demanding criminal prosecution of its author. Shamir speculated that had such a text ever fallen into the hands of General Andrey Vlasov himself, even Vlasov "might have wondered if it went too far". Shamir expressed outrage that the liberal intelligentsia had largely ignored Prosvirnin's article.

Prosvirnin, for his part, insisted that the text was strictly anti-communist in nature and targeted solely the organizers of the Red Terror and the Great Purge. He argued that the Nazi invasion had shattered the illusion that "a Party membership booklet was a ticket to paradise on earth", turning it instead into a "death sentence". He suggested that similar existential shocks were felt by the Soviet leadership during the 1991 collapse and by the Kremlin during the 2011 post-election protests, where nationalists rallied alongside liberal figures like Boris Nemtsov for the first time in years. An investigator later questioned Prosvirnin about the article, but a preliminary inquiry yielded no results, and the text was eventually removed from the Sputnik and Pogrom website.

In 2016, Konstantin Syomin of Russia-24 again leveled accusations of hate speech against Prosvirnin. Prosvirnin dismissed the charges but acknowledged that Syomin had inadvertently conceded an important point: Prosvirnin had succeeded in communicating with the younger generation and was "leading them away from the ideals of communism and socialism". Yegor Kholmogorov, meanwhile, asserted that Prosvirnin had categorically renounced any support for Vlasov's forces. In April 2015, a piece signed by Prosvirnin analyzed the Vlasov movement's program and condemned Vlasov as being closer to "liberal circles" and "more of a Trotskyist", fundamentally hostile to the ideas of nationalism and a "united and indivisible Russia".

The European Network for Anti-Fascist Monitoring included Prosvirnin in its list of 47 Russian organizations, events, groups, and individuals espousing far-right views. He remained on that list even after his death (as of June 2022).

In 2013, during his Moscow mayoral campaign, Alexei Navalny included in his platform a proposal to consider a visa regime with Central Asian countries. This stance provoked sharp criticism from liberals and accusations of fascist propaganda. Prosvirnin, who was backing Navalny at the time, not only urged Navalny to ignore the "respectable handshake-worthy public" but also openly attacked prominent liberal opposition figures by name in his articles.

Prosvirnin attended the large rally on Manezhnaya Square on 18 July 2013, where Navalny supporters gathered to protest his conviction in the Kirovles case. Journalist Ilya Azar noted that Prosvirnin claimed to be covering the opposition event for Aeroflot's inflight magazine, though he ironically described himself as a "Russian fascist who came out to support a Russian fascist". Slogans like "For Navalny! For Hitler!" appeared on the Sputnik and Pogrom website on 8 September 2013. Notably, these did not send shockwaves through the liberal community in the way that the 2013 Biryulyovo riots did.

Multiple media outlets frequently accused Prosvirnin of trolling. Komsomolskaya Pravda observed that some protest movement leaders had turned their backs on him after encountering what they described as "caveman nationalism" wrapped in an "intellectual veneer".

On 6 October 2014, Prosvirnin reported on Facebook that he had been taken to a police station to provide explanations regarding Sputnik and Pogrom, where they claimed to have found public calls for extremist activity (Article 280.2 of Russia's Criminal Code). Prosvirnin refused to testify, and the case was referred back to the Federal Security Service for a final decision on whether to pursue an investigation.

On 17 September 2015, Prosvirnin's lawyer announced that officers from the Investigative Committee of Russia and the Center for Countering Extremism had searched his client's apartment. The search warrant was issued in connection with a criminal case opened under Article 282, Part 1 of the Criminal Code (incitement of hatred or enmity) regarding a piece published on Sputnik and Pogrom under Prosvirnin's name. Prosvirnin was listed as a witness in the case. According to some reports, the article in question was "What We Stand For, What Will Be, and What Won't", in which Prosvirnin advocated for the annexation of Ukraine, Belarus, and Northern Kazakhstan by Russia. The case ultimately did not proceed, as no evidence of guilt was found, though the police confiscated a substantial amount of equipment, which had still not been returned to him as of late 2021. Prosvirnin claimed he was essentially being charged with "insulting the Ukrainian people", which struck him as illogical given the official media coverage of the Donbas war. He noted that the investigator admitted to him privately that he did not specialize in extremism cases and had no personal interest in pursuing charges. Yegor Kholmogorov stated that at Prosvirnin's request, he visited the investigator in late 2015 to discuss the publication. He argued that it was impossible to definitively establish the authorship of online texts. Kholmogorov believed this argument helped lead to the case being shelved. A few days after the search, Prosvirnin made a statement claiming the Russian state was the primary enemy of the Russian people. The event organizers, alarmed by his rhetoric, asked him to "behave more appropriately", later attributing his outburst to the "emotional strain" caused by the threat of criminal prosecution.

=== Death ===
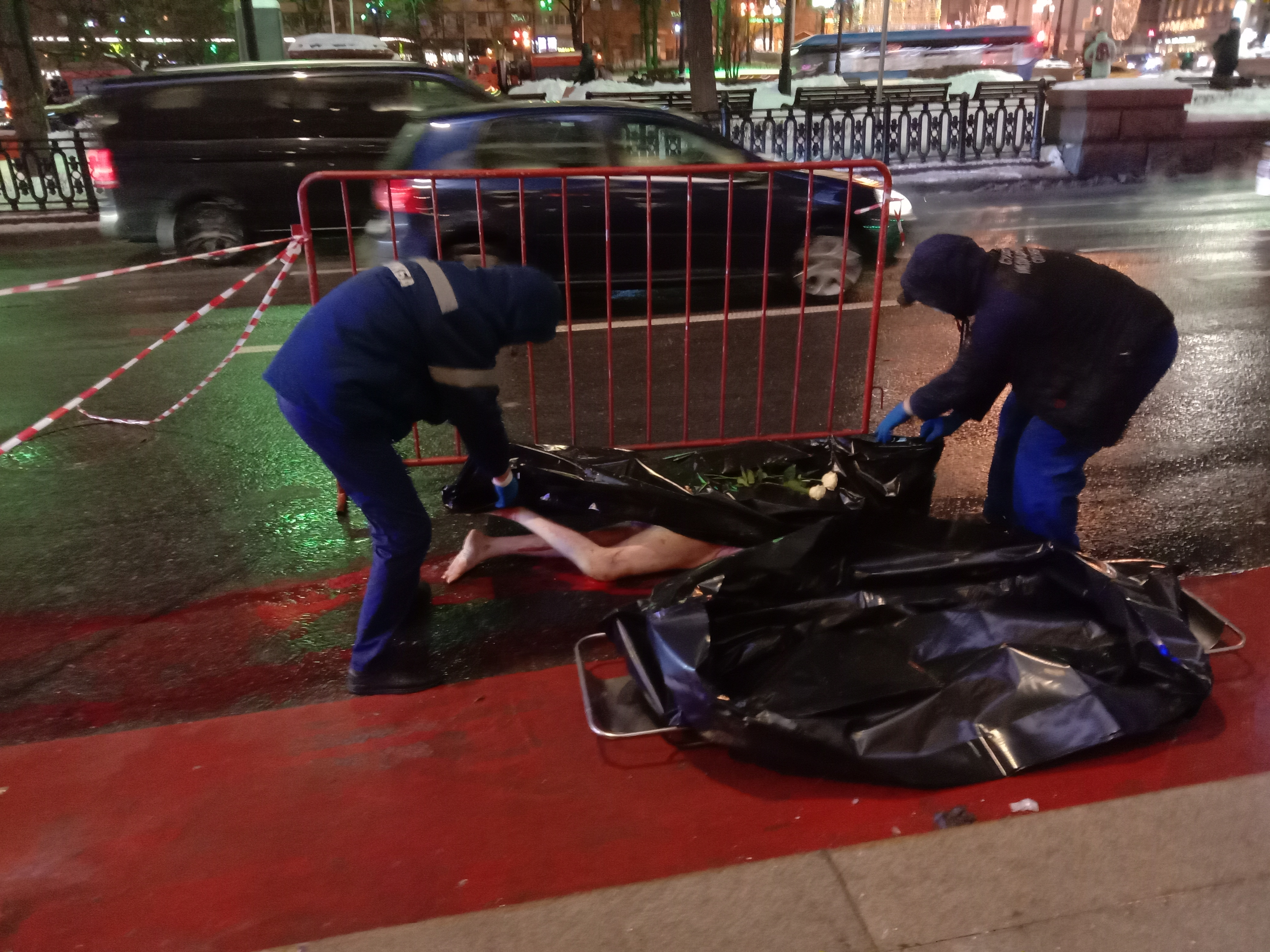
Paramedics place Prosvirnin's body into a body bag, 27 December 2021

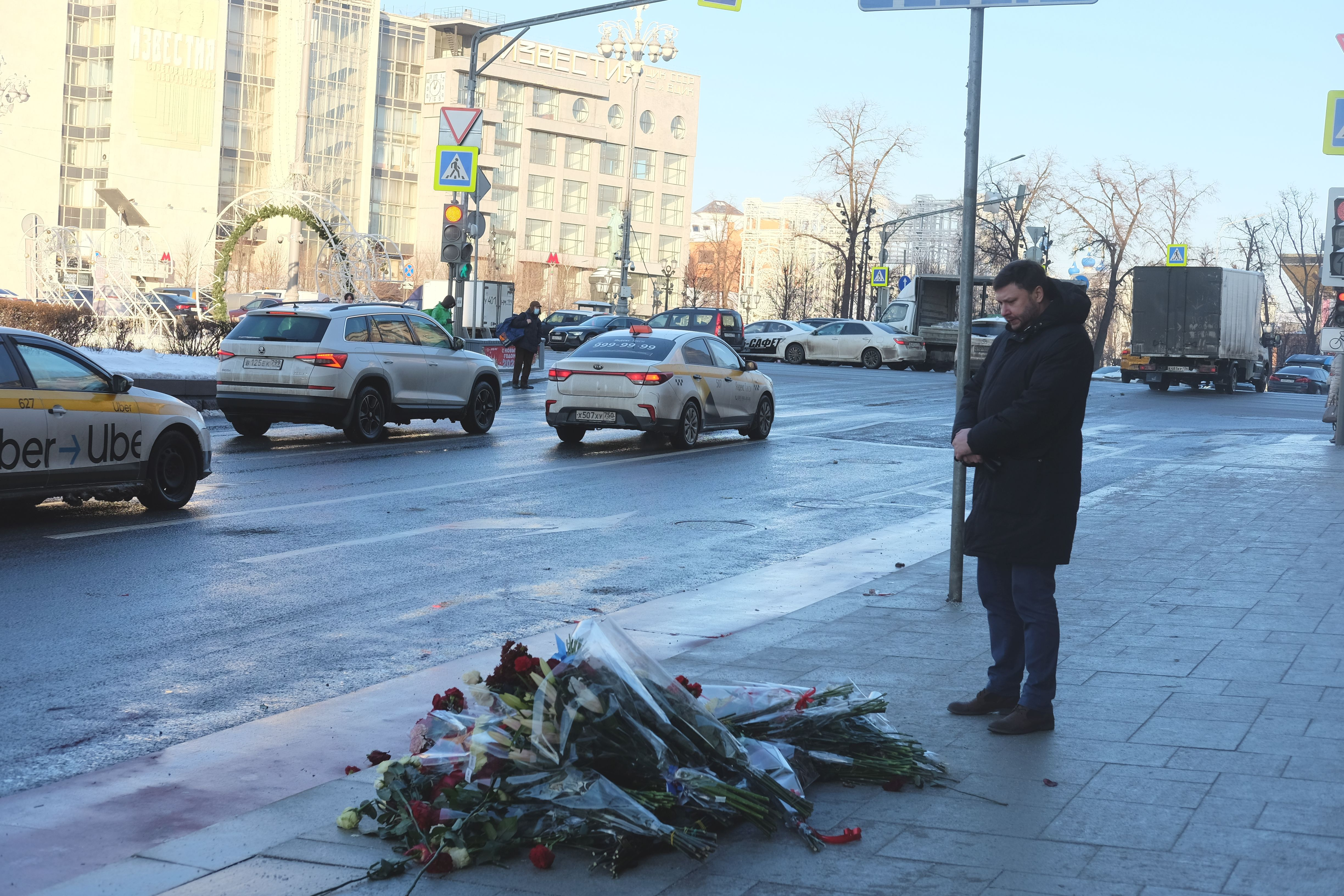
Egor Prosvirnin civil memorial on Tverskoy Boulevard

On 27 December, 2021, Egor Prosvirnin died after falling from the balcony of an apartment building at 28 Tverskoy Boulevard in central Moscow. He was found unclothed, a knife and a canister of pepper spray were discovered near his body. Media reports cited either an accident or suicide as possible explanations for the incident. The following day, an official statement was released on Prosvirnin's YouTube channel and social media pages, posted by his associates, asserting that his death was a tragic accident. According to these statements, Prosvirnin had been "unwell, suffering from insomnia, and in a gloomy state of mind", but had no intention of taking his own life. Oleg Kashin, however, expressed the belief that Prosvirnin's death was a suicide driven by severe depression, rooted in his anguish over not having fully realized his potential as a writer and commentator. Rumors of a suicide note being found at the scene circulated briefly in the press and on Telegram channels but were never substantiated.

A posthumous toxicology report indicated the presence of traces of cocaine, MDMA, and the medication doxylamine (a sedating antihistamine) in his system, though at low levels. The online outlet czar.tv, where Prosvirnin had worked as editor-in-chief, claimed that the forensic chemical analysis had detected these substances in his urine but not in his bloodstream. It was also reported that shortly before his death, Prosvirnin had been taking nitroglycerin and the muscle relaxant tizanidine (Sirdalud) to treat heart pain and neuralgia. Members of Prosvirnin's YouTube team suggested that he had tried to "drown his physical pain and existential anguish in alcohol". However, the official forensic medical examination concluded that there was no alcohol present in his blood.

Egor Prosvirnin was buried on 4 January 2022, at the Troyekurovskoye Cemetery in Moscow. A total of 8.97 million rubles was raised through crowdfunding to cover funeral and related expenses. Several hundred people attended the funeral to pay their respects. Memorial services were held in his honor at the Alexander Nevsky Cathedral in Novosibirsk and the Church of Archangel Gabriel in Moscow.

== Personal life ==
On 28 September 2021, Prosvirnin married Marina Ivanova (Urusova), whom he had met in 2015. He noted that journalists from Russia's state-run Channel One attended the wedding. Prosvirnin claimed that before beginning a stable relationship with Marina, he had been living in Reutov and that the relationship helped him improve both his physical health and material circumstances. At one point, he said, his weight had reached 160 kg (approximately 350 lbs). He underwent a gastric sleeve resection, having two-thirds of his stomach removed, after which his weight dropped dramatically, from 164 kg down to 92–93 kg.

Prosvirnin described himself initially as an introvert who was not particularly fond of people. He also stated that he was "not a fan of religion in the 21st century" and even considered himself a "militant atheist". He viewed the Orthodox Church in the Russian Empire primarily as an instrument of propaganda, though he acknowledged its crucial role in establishing parochial schools and developing primary education. He was generally categorized as belonging to the "secular segment" of ethnic nationalism. However, according to his wife, in the final period of his life, Prosvirnin became a believer. During this time, he advocated for Eastern Orthodoxy to be granted the status of state religion and adopted the slogan, "Glory to Christ, shame on the Antichrist!" He also remarked that if his proposed political projects were ever fully realized, he would happily retire from politics and "move to a little house in the woods and start writing children's books". He consistently denied harboring any personal political ambitions.

As of 2017, Prosvirnin was living in an apartment in a Khrushchevka building. He actually preferred it to newer high-rises, which he saw as "dystopian set pieces" that evoked feelings of loneliness and depression. He later moved to an apartment on Tverskoy Boulevard, which Oleg Kashin described as a "rented hovel in a decaying Stalinist building with an Armenian dive bar". Lawyer and writer Ivan Mironov claimed that Prosvirnin was an advocate for COVID-19 vaccination, though Prosvirnin himself was opposed to the introduction of mandatory QR code passes.

In 2021, Prosvirnin named The Devil's Guide to Hollywood by Joe Eszterhas as his favorite book. Back in 2014, he had spoken of deriving special pleasure from reading Andrei Platonov and Vladimir Mayakovsky, authors whose prose and poetry, he felt, became "utterly meaningless" when translated into foreign languages. Later, while preparing English translations of some Sputnik and Pogrom texts, he concluded that a significant portion of "intra-Russian discourse" was simply untranslatable, and that any text intended for a foreign audience was better off written from scratch. A typical Russian lunch for him included a "monstrous Soviet-era Olivier salad", pelmeni with sour cream, and blini with homemade varenye or red caviar. As for the national beverage, he swore by kvass.

== Political positions ==
Prosvirnin considered figures like Konstantin Krylov to be kindred spirits in terms of ideology. He regarded Dmitry Galkovsky as his "teacher" and also noted the influence of Oleg Kashin on the formation of his worldview. While he acknowledged a certain convergence of "intentions" with the ideas of Alexander Prokhanov and Alexander Dugin regarding dominance in the post-Soviet space, he admitted he had never seriously read their work and preferred to mock them. He held Igor Girkin in particular esteem as a proponent of "White Guard, anti-communist views". During the siege of Sloviansk, he declared that if Girkin were to march on Moscow, entire government military units would defect to his side. He also spoke respectfully of Yuri Budanov, believing the charges against him for killing of Elza Kungayeva were fabricated. In 2021, he named Konstantin Pobedonostsev, the ultra-conservative advisor to Alexander III of Russia, as his favorite historical figure.

In the earliest days of Sputnik and Pogrom, Prosvirnin supported Alexei Navalny. He backed Navalny's candidacy during the 2013 Moscow mayoral election, viewing him as the optimal candidate for Russian nationalists. He welcomed the 2011–2013 Russian protests in support of Navalny and even authored an article titled "We Have Found a Leader!" At the time, Navalny's campaign was under heavy fire from liberal circles, who accused him of promoting nationalism and racism and pandering to "drunken thugs with clubs just looking to crack a Tajik's skull". Prosvirnin did not withdraw his support initially, expecting that Navalny would not cave to his critics. However, after Navalny lost the election and subsequently abandoned nationalist rhetoric, Prosvirnin became thoroughly disillusioned with him. By 2017, he was calling Navalny "just plain stupid", and by 2018, he had dismissed him as a "scandalous auntie" who was only good at "exposing low-level embezzlers".

Prosvirnin frequently accused public figures and politicians who styled themselves as Russian nationalists of secretly promoting a pro-Ukrainian perspective on Crimea and the Donbas, a charge he leveled at Vyacheslav Maltsev, among others. He considered Dmitry Demushkin an "outright neo-Nazi" and expressed surprise that Demushkin had "not been locked up for some 10 years" despite openly advocating violence. Demushkin, for his part, claimed that Prosvirnin devoted an inordinate amount of time to discussing him during his livestreams.

Prosvirnin rejected the veneration of Nicholas II within the Russian nationalist movement. He argued that after the Emperor's abdication, not a single person in the Russian Empire risked an attempt to rescue the imprisoned royal family, and that by the time of his abdication, the Emperor had come to inspire nothing but utter bewilderment among his subjects. Leonid Bershidsky also observed that Prosvirnin did not cooperate with most nationalist groups and organizations, as they were, in his view, fixated on primitive dogmas that left no room for tactical maneuver. Explaining his refusal to work with other movements in 2012, Prosvirnin stated that nearly all such factions were hung up on religion, forms of government, and populism, and that the radical ideas they espoused were merely a cover for the redistribution of property. He claimed such people lived "in a world of ideological dogma and props fit for elementary schoolers". The newspaper Komsomolskaya Pravda suggested that such attitudes disqualified Prosvirnin from being considered a true nationalist, as he did not identify with the common Russian folk.

=== Russian nationalism ===
Prosvirnin described himself as "a convinced Russian nationalist since middle school", regarding the classical national movements that flared up across various parts of Europe in the 19th and 20th centuries as his ideal. His writings on nationalism began appearing in Russian Journal in the late 2000s and early 2010s. In these pieces, he examined the portrayal of Russia and Russians in video games, addressed the socio-political and philosophical questions raised by certain game franchises (citing examples like Mass Effect and BioShock), and discussed the prospects of the domestic computer game industry and its educational impact on youth (using simulators like IL-2 Sturmovik and World of Tanks as examples).

Above all, Prosvirnin considered himself an advocate for the idea of a "Russian National State" or a "nation-state of the Russian people", modeled on various state forms around the world, which would bring together all ethnic Russians. The core message of his ideology was that Russians should elect their own government and control their own tax revenues. He viewed contemporary Russian society as more atomized than that of an average European one.

Prosvirnin believed the ideal identity for Russians was the one that had existed in pre-revolutionary Russia, as it would allow Russians to become a "normal European people" characterized by a distinctly European sense of self-interest. He argued that the legitimacy of any new state should be drawn directly from pre-revolutionary Russia, thereby positioning Russians as a European people adhering to "normal civilized norms". In his view, anyone who discovered and fell in love with the "real Russia, the Russia before 1917", could no longer subscribe to either communist or liberal political convictions. He maintained that in the Russian Empire, the overwhelming majority of the aristocracy and elite were Orthodox Russians, and he regarded 1721, the year Russia attained imperial status and ceased being a "semi-Asiatic Poland", as Russia's greatest triumph.

Among the European standards he cited were: democracy (which he defined as the right of a nation to govern its own fate), equality before the law (meaning the absence of "states within a state" or ethnic republics), the separation of three branches of power (legislative, executive, judicial), and the principle of "the state for the Russians, not Russians for the state" (a rejection of any notion of a "historical mission"). He acknowledged, however, that absolute freedom of speech could not exist in any society. To him, Russian nationalism was a means of creating a unified legal reality within Russia, as well as a homogenous European nation-state. He also considered the repatriation of capital to be crucial for the realization of a "Russian National State". Prosvirnin did not rule out the possibility that the construction of such a state might require a civil war, which he speculated could be triggered by a hypothetical collapse of the Russian separatist forces in Ukraine and their defeat by the Armed Forces of Ukraine.

Prosvirnin identified the chief problem of modern Russia as the absence of a compelling vision for a Russian future. He placed "Russian national interests" at the forefront of his ideological convictions, speaking critically of internationalism and expressing skepticism toward ideas of "universal world justice" or providing military or political aid to foreign states. He posited that just as pre-revolutionary Russia was the "Bride of Christ" who suffered to save Europe, and the Soviet Union was the spark intended to ignite a global revolutionary fire, post-Soviet Russia must also implement some grand project to enter history and be remembered favorably by posterity, without, however, repeating the steps of monarchists, communists, or pro-Western liberals. He argued that the Russian Empire lacked a formal state ideology, and membership in a particular social estate was akin to fulfilling a contract with that estate.

Interpretations of Prosvirnin's nationalist views vary. Leonid Bershidsky described them as a "cocktail of capitalist liberalism and nationalism". Political scientist Emil Pain argued they were shaped at the intersection of two opposing forces: national democracy and imperial nationalism. Oleg Kashin simply called it "hipster nationalism". Bershidsky also noted that Prosvirnin evaluated all news exclusively through the lens of whether it was beneficial for the Russian ethnos. He compared this approach, citing American public intellectual Stanley Fish, to the method used by American Jews in the 1940s and 1950s when discussing current events, a paradigm later adopted by other national, religious, social, and racial groups as a foundational question of identity politics: "What is good for the particular concerns of our isolated interests?" Bershidsky called Prosvirnin's deployment of the question "What is good for Russians?" a "brilliant marketing find by a savvy columnist".

=== Views on democracy and liberalism ===
Prosvirnin described himself at a certain point as being simultaneously "a nationalist, a democrat, and a liberal". In particular, he advocated for the development of democratic institutions and further liberalization within a new Russian state, actively defending freedom of opinion while not deeming a state ideology obligatory. In his ideal vision, the Russian people should demand normal democratic constitutional development, relying on law as the foundation of a European society. Prosvirnin argued that Imperial Russia possessed robust traditions of self-governance down to the level of the peasant commune, as well as democratic traditions marked by a vibrant political life. Yet by 2017, he estimated that at most 10% of Russia's population took any interest in politics, while the rest preferred a life of private concerns.

Citing the United States as an example of a formed political nation, Prosvirnin pointed to the presence of primary and secondary social ties, the capacity for self-organization, and the ability to defend one's rights. He argued that the classic urban European bourgeois was a guild member who could count on the guild's protection "if something went wrong". In his view, the protection of property stemmed from a structured national society, not from a strong state. He considered the absence of these institutions in Russia to be not only a drawback but also an advantage, as it left Russians free to build a society according to their own rules. However, he also cited the lack of a landowning class as the primary elite as a serious shortcoming.

Despite these views, the articles published in Sputnik and Pogrom frequently employed anti-liberal rhetoric. Prosvirnin spoke negatively of modern liberal parties and liberal political figures in Russia, asserting that the idea of liberalism in contemporary Russia was championed by "scoundrels". This attitude was partly fueled by the numerous threats and insults directed at him due to his publications. He also believed that Russian liberals had been "duped" by Dmitry Medvedev, who, early in his presidency, had taken steps that appeared to align with liberal tenets. For accusing Russian nationalists of promoting neo-Nazism and neo-fascism, Prosvirnin dismissed the Russian liberal intelligentsia as "Soviet" in mentality. Finnish researcher Jussi Jussila has noted that such rhetoric from Prosvirnin bore similarities to the discourse of the American alt-right.

Prosvirnin felt that the politicians of the 1990s had been shaped in an atmosphere of "relative freedom" and a "sometimes monstrous" sincerity, which made them more appealing to him than contemporary liberal figures. At the same time, he condemned the left-liberal discourse in the West, which he felt was "tightening the screws" and driving people to discuss and comment on news via anonymous imageboards like 4chan. Commenting on the neoliberal tendency to divide society into winners and losers, Prosvirnin claimed that in the United States this manifested as a conflict between white and non-white politics and compared such policies to those of Bolsheviks following their victory in the Russian Civil War. He described mass immigration into the United States as a struggle by the "colored nations" against white America.

In the final years of his life, Prosvirnin grew disillusioned with democracy and began promoting monarchist views, speaking highly of meritocracy as a concomitant feature of an ideal monarchy. He was "lukewarm" toward the philosophy of Ivan Ilyin, due to Ilyin's heavy emphasis on religion. He had begun actively advancing monarchist ideas around June 2021, although as early as the summer of 2014 he had named Peter the Great as Russia's principal national hero and had even made ironic remarks in favor of restoring a constitutional monarchy in Russia under Prince Michael of Kent, describing the Windsors as "the only more or less normal monarchy in the modern world". By late 2021, he was describing the emergence of democracy, the State Duma, and suffrage in 1905 as "divine punishment" for the Russian Empire, and he expressed fear that Russia might be on the verge of a new revolution, regardless of which political faction sparked it, which would merely be a logical continuation of the "nightmare" that had begun in 1917. According to Dmitry Demushkin, in his final years Prosvirnin not only distanced himself from nationalism but had even begun to criticize it more frequently.

=== Anti-communism and anti-Sovietism ===
Egor Prosvirnin was a fierce anti-communist who vehemently criticized the Soviet regime in his writings, denouncing it as fundamentally anti-Russian. Specifically, he accused the communists of oppressing the Russian people on ethnic grounds. He condemned the Soviet nomenklatura as incompatible with European norms of life and decried the policy of korenizatsiia, which he argued laid the groundwork for the Soviet Union's eventual collapse and the eruption of ethnic flashpoints. He dismissed the ideology of Eurasianism as "nonsense", akin to communism itself, and branded its chief proponent, Alexander Dugin, a "religious obscurantist". He also harbored a particular animosity toward Sergey Kurginyan and his movement Essence of Time, which he likened to a "communist sect" comparable to Aum Shinrikyo. Prosvirnin accused Kurginyan of recycling Soviet propaganda clichés when analyzing political events, and in 2014 he went so far as to accuse Essence of Time of attempting to cast a shadow over the issue of Crimea's annexation. He also faulted former Russia-24 anchor Konstantin Syomin for injecting leftist views into television coverage.

Prosvirnin repeatedly called 1917 the most tragic year in Russian history, marking the death of "historical Russia". He argued that in the decades that followed, a "Russian state" that genuinely defended the interests of Russians as a nation had never been established. While condemning the Belovezha Accords that formally dissolved the Soviet Union, he also believed that after the Soviet collapse, many vestiges of Soviet state ideology persisted in the mentality of Russia's residents, most notably, what he termed "Soviet nationalism". He adhered to the thesis that "The Russian Federation is not Russia", based on the legal premise that the modern-day Russia was merely the successor to the defunct Russian Soviet Federative Socialist Republic. He contended that since its inception, the Russian Federation had never given the Russian nationalist movement a lawful avenue to represent its interests at any level of power.

Prosvirnin believed the Soviet Union had fostered a "culture of doublethink" and total hypocrisy, where people publicly professed one thing while privately believing another. In his view, it was imperative for the Russian Federation to rid itself of this phenomenon.

Prosvirnin considered it unacceptable to conflate Russian nationalism with Soviet patriotism, particularly the cult of Joseph Stalin or nostalgia for the fallen state. He believed that the modern middle-class individual (the "young intellectual professional") had no interest in such associations, and found the notion of using Stalin as a symbol of Russian nationalism unthinkable. He held Stalin responsible for forced collectivization, the brutal dekulakization, the catastrophic military defeats in the opening months of the Eastern Front of World War II, and the issuing of Order No. 227, which resulted in immense loss of life. He repeatedly called for the public disclosure of the names of all victims of Soviet repression. He was sharply critical of the iconography of Victory Day and the holiday's celebrations. In an article published on 9 May 2013, he called such festivities "blasphemy", insisting that the wartime sacrifice should be solemnly remembered rather than marking the occasion with "idiotic celebration".

According to Oleg Kashin, Prosvirnin once wrote a panegyric about Marshal Georgy Zhukov, inspired by an article in the magazine Ogoniok. The piece detailed Zhukov's attempts following the 20th Congress of the Communist Party of the Soviet Union to rehabilitate military officers repressed in the 1930s and to secure a full condemnation of Stalin's cult of personality. Prosvirnin sought to portray Zhukov as a Russian hero who had struggled against the Bolsheviks.

Even while criticizing Essence of Time and communist ideology, Prosvirnin was careful to note that he did not view the Soviet era as unrelenting darkness. In various interviews, he acknowledged the ultimate victory over Nazi Germany, noting Stalin's strategic pivot away from militant anti-religious policies toward appeals to Russian history, as well as the Soviet Union's technological breakthroughs from the space program to the construction of powerful missile cruisers and submarines. However, he maintained that the human cost of these achievements was far too high. He stressed that the Soviet Union was marked not only by shortages of basic goods but also by severe restrictions on information and a Party leadership that ignored "Russian national interests". He saw the October Revolution as an ordeal that gave birth to a Soviet people, rather than a Russian one. In his assessment, Russians paid for Stalin's industrialization with an enormous death toll.

=== Anti-Putinism ===
Even during his active years blogging on LiveJournal, Prosvirnin asserted that none of his subscribers held a favorable view of Vladimir Putin. In a post dated 13 April 2007, he spoke of Putin in extremely harsh and crude terms, urging his followers to support the Dissenters' March organized by Eduard Limonov. On principle, he never engaged with the Russian Presidential Administration, though printouts of his articles frequently ended up in the hands of its staff. It was said, for instance, that Vyacheslav Volodin had spoken highly of some of his texts. Prosvirnin himself stated that all he wanted from the contemporary Russian state was to be left alone, so he could remain an independent voice.

In November 2014, film director Dunya Smirnova remarked on Vladimir Pozner Jr.'s talk show that the milieu of Russian nationalists was quite fascinating, brimming with intellectual passion, adding, "The conventional Dugin, for example, holds no interest for me at all… but Prosvirnin interests me." Petr Aven, one of the architects of the Yeltsin economic reforms, recounted that Smirnova's husband, Anatoly Chubais, had actually recommended Prosvirnin's website to him, "which was surprising to hear from a man who was in our government in 1992". Political strategist Stanislav Belkovsky explained Chubais's interest in the nationalist outlet as a consequence of his wife's influence, noting, "Sputnik and Pogrom is the result of the aestheticism instilled in him by his current spouse, for whom aesthetic judgments carry far more weight than ethical ones".

According to Prosvirnin, at a November 2016 gathering of readers of the outlet Republic.ru, former Presidential Administration chief Alexander Voloshin claimed he didn't read Republic.ru, yet simultaneously maintained a paid subscription to Sputnik and Pogrom. Prosvirnin quipped that "the hosts of the evening stood there with red faces". Following the event, Prosvirnin suggested to Voloshin that they hold a Sputnik and Pogrom reader meet-up featuring cigars and whiskey. Voloshin agreed and gave him his business card, but the event never materialized due to Prosvirnin's self-admitted lack of organizational skills. Commenting on Voloshin's politics, Prosvirnin noted, "Of course, you couldn't call him a Russian nationalist, but it was clear there was some national feeling there, some understanding".

Prosvirnin was critical of many decisions made by Putin during his presidency, particularly those concerning domestic policy and the fight against extremism. He expressed frustration that Russian nationalist parties were routinely denied official registration and that the activities of nationalists were treated as a threat equivalent to international terrorism. When commenting on Putin's endorsements of conservative values, Prosvirnin emphasized that Putin often failed to account for the consequences of 20th-century history and argued that some of the Kremlin's decisions were even more dangerous than the imposition of a left-liberal cultural agenda. At the same time, following the outbreak of 2014 pro-Russian unrest in Ukraine, Prosvirnin began making ironic remarks to the effect that "the Kremlin has finally started doing what I've been talking about for years". He even expressed a willingness to serve as an advisor on domestic policy. He maintained, however, that he would only support the Russian government's stance in the Donbas if the conflict escalated into an open war between Ukraine and Russia. While positioning himself as an opponent of political repression, he insisted on drawing a distinction between opposing the prosecution of "thoughtcrimes" and his personal antipathy toward individuals who actively promoted separatism within Russia.

=== Views on domestic policy ===
Prosvirnin held a negative view of mass labor immigration from Central Asia. He repeatedly suggested that any labor shortages in Moscow could be addressed by inviting residents from Russia's own regions to fill low-skilled positions, believing they could handle the work just as effectively. That said, Prosvirnin acknowledged that Tajik migrants in Russia possessed a "healthy national self-awareness" and that their conversations centered not on abstract global justice but on the welfare of the Tajik people. He observed that hard-working Asian cultures often maintain an extremely strong cult of the extended family. Consequently, he warned that if such a nationality were to settle en masse, they would form hermetic communities impervious to outside ideas, rather than assimilating. In his manifesto "Why I Am a Russian Nationalist", published on Sputnik and Pogrom in November 2016, Prosvirnin described the internal adversary using the derogatory term "mnogonatsional", a pun blending the official term for "multinational people" with a pejorative suffix.

Over the years, Prosvirnin cited various examples of what he considered ideal nation-states that Russia might emulate. In a 2013 interview, he named Germany as the state of the German people, France as the state of the French, and Italy as the state of the Italians. In a 2017 interview, he expanded this list to include Poland, where he claimed five to ten major nationalist parties operate, as well as the United States, which he noted contained both liberal-left and religious-right nationalists, and Hungary, which he praised for fighting to preserve its national culture and pursuing policies of assimilation. Rejecting the term "brotherly peoples", Prosvirnin stated in 2014 that only Serbs, the French, Germans, Italians, and Finns retained a relative "complementarity" with Russians. He added that while the Scandinavian countries and peoples were more distant toward Russia, they nonetheless resembled the ideal template of what Russia might have become without the Bolsheviks.

Dismissing the civic term "Rossiyane" (Russian citizens, as distinct from ethnic Russians), Prosvirnin insisted that the definition of national interests should rely on the strength of ethnic Russians as a nation, "the largest and most cultured people in the country, comprising eighty percent of the population". In his view, Russia should not be considered a multinational state but rather a mononational one, citing what he claimed were United Nations standards stipulating that a state is considered mononational when the dominant nation exceeds 60% of the population. He rejected the concept of ethnic republics and autonomous regions, calling their creation artificial and demanding their conversion into governorates.

=== Views on foreign policy ===
Prosvirnin described Russians as an "old European people", regarding the "European path" as the only acceptable course for Russia's state development. In his view, only the countries of Western Europe and the United States practiced a "sensible nationalism". He was critical of Russia's deepening ties with Asian countries and its participation in the BRICS, arguing that the so-called "Asian Tigers" would never truly become developed nations. He dismissed the existence of the Customs Union of the Eurasian Economic Union as "pernicious Eurasianism".

At the same time, he argued that the Russian Empire had faced the same fundamental problems as Russia did at the turn of the 21st century: a major geopolitical rival (the British Empire then, the United States now), a standoff with an analog of the European Union (the French and German Empires), intrigues involving Poland, "Ukrainian betrayals", and the eventual collapse of statehood. He believed that isolating the decision-making principles of that earlier era could help contemporary Russia resolve most of its pressing domestic and foreign issues. In 2017, Prosvirnin stated that Russians had emerged as losers after the collapse of the Soviet Union and the end of the Cold War, with Americans effectively "poaching" them, luring them to the U.S. with promises of a higher standard of living and better salaries, something he claimed Americans had also done to the Germans after World War II.

An advocate for Russian irredentism, Prosvirnin had called since 2012 for the annexation of Ukrainian territory by Russia, branding Ukraine an "anti-Russian state" and rejecting the legitimacy of Ukrainian statehood outright. He conceded the possibility of leaving Galicia (Western Ukraine) outside the boundaries of a future "Russian national state", suggesting it might instead join a revived Austro-Hungarian Monarchy. He also supported the incorporation of Belarus, Northern Kazakhstan, and the Baltic states into Russia, though he qualified this by saying that Russia had no need for territories devoid of ethnic Russians, a rationale he used to reject claims on Poland and Finland, despite their historic inclusion in the Russian Empire as the Congress Kingdom of Poland and the Grand Duchy of Finland, respectively. He termed this hypothetical process of unification "irredenta", viewing it as the necessary mechanism for reuniting a Russian people scattered across different states after the Soviet collapse. In his vision, a unified state of 200 million people would require three capitals: Saint Petersburg, Moscow, and Kyiv. By 2017, he admitted that he was particularly drawn to the borders of the Russian Empire as they stood in 1913.

In an interview with Dmitry Gordon, Prosvirnin discussed the Euromaidan events and spoke with extreme disdain about the idea of Ukrainian nationalism. He argued that its identity should be built around Peter the Great, not Stepan Bandera, and he characterized the ideas propagated by Ukrainian nationalist parties as "provincial". He was equally unsparing in his assessment of Ukrainian elites and leading politicians, viewing the signing of the European Union–Ukraine Association Agreement as a deeply unfavorable deal that would ultimately wreck Ukraine's economy. According to him, an ideal Ukraine would position itself as the "real Russia", a place that would attract people of Russian culture, entrepreneurs, scientists, and young intellectuals. Instead, he lamented, Ukraine had pursued the thesis "Ukraine is not Russia". Prosvirnin noted that the events of 2014 transformed his brand of nationalism from a "half-playful, 'hipster nationalism' with giggles" into something else entirely, "a nationalism of gunpowder and blood, with noble fury replacing playschool irony".

Prosvirnin advocated for the recognition of Transnistria's independence, followed by its eventual unification with Russia. He expressed particular sympathy for Transnistrian President Vadim Krasnoselsky due to his monarchist, White Guard, and anti-communist views, and he supported Krasnoselsky's candidacy in the 2021 Transnistrian presidential election. He asserted that "in Transnistria, under Krasnoselsky's leadership, the only state formation currently in existence is being built that is remarkably close to the policies Russian nationalists would implement". Prosvirnin also highlighted that Krasnoselsky was constructing a Russian identity in Transnistria rooted in the Russian imperial past rather than the Soviet one.

=== Anti-Ukrainianism ===
Prosvirnin's attitude toward Euromaidan was initially ambivalent. Before Russia's annexation of Crimea in 2014, he spoke positively about the Euromaidan supporters and even noted the successes of the Right Sector, despite the fact that when they met him in person, they accused him of Ukrainophobia. According to his original view, Euromaidan had arisen to defend democratic rights and freedoms that Viktor Yanukovych's government was allegedly attempting to abolish with the anti-protest laws. Prosvirnin supported the tactical methods of the protest movement and hoped that Euromaidan would spark the construction of a European-style democracy in Ukraine, potentially even leading to the formation of a Russian nationalist party there. He observed that the movement involved a consolidation of Ukrainian national identity and a direct confrontation with a "stagnant Soviet system".

On 3 February 2014, Prosvirnin gave an interview to the Ukrainian outlet hromadske, in which he offered a number of flattering remarks about the Euromaidan participants. He claimed that those he had spoken with assured him they had no grievances against the Russian people and that the Euromaidan consisted solely of opponents of Yanukovych. During the interview, he condemned the violence perpetrated by the Berkut riot police against protesters, stating that such methods were unacceptable in any democratic state. However, the hosts took issue when Prosvirnin invoked comparisons to Hitlerites while describing certain protester actions and mentioned the presence of football ultras displaying neo-Nazi symbols.

Soon after, Prosvirnin admitted that his expectations had not been met. He claimed to have discerned an "openly Russophobic disposition" among the Euromaidan participants, who made deeply insulting remarks about Russian culture, Russia, and its citizens, while openly ignoring the interests of the 10 million Ukrainian citizens who identified as ethnic Russians. He later wrote a sort of "letter of repentance" to his subscribers for his initial support of Euromaidan, explaining that during the hromadske interview he had simply wanted to ingratiate himself with Ukrainians and had consciously showered them with compliments while suppressing his previous views on Ukraine.

Disillusioned with Euromaidan and having concluded that peaceful coexistence between Russian and Ukrainian nationalists was impossible, Prosvirnin threw his full support behind both Russia's annexation of Crimea and the protests in Ukraine's southeast, framing them as part of a Russian irredenta. In his opinion, the overthrow of Yanukovych had brought to power "rural cretins from the West" who openly supported discrimination against Russians. Following the 2014 Crimean status referendum, he asserted that Crimea had no alternative but annexation by Russia. He characterized the outbreak of protests in eastern Ukraine as a "spontaneous popular uprising" and called on Russia to provide tangible support to all organizations advocating for the reunification of Eastern Ukraine with Russia. He described the ensuing armed conflict as a "war of Russian national insurrection against the Ukrainian state" and a "Russian national liberation uprising". He accused participants in anti-war protests of spreading defeatist propaganda, dismissing them as "overgrown idiots". He further declared that the events in Crimea and the Donbas had purified the Russian national movement by weeding out those who had merely been feigning concern for the rights and interests of the Russian people. According to his logic, any person who sided with Ukraine in the war in the southeast was no longer Russian but a Ukrainian nationalist, a distinction he extended to Russian-speaking members of the Ukrainian Armed Forces. He proposed applying the same litmus test to Russian liberals to determine where their true allegiances lay in the conflict.

Readers of Sputnik and Pogrom began providing active assistance to the pro-Russian separatists. By Prosvirnin's estimates, "hundreds of readers" went to fight on the side of Novorossiya. In 2018, he specified that around 300 people had volunteered. The publication also raised approximately 60 million rubles to purchase an armored personnel carrier for the separatist forces. Additionally, Prosvirnin's team provided humanitarian aid to hospitals and orphanages. According to a 23 June 2014 report by Igor Girkin, two representatives of Sputnik and Pogrom delivered a major shipment of supplies to him in Sloviansk from Saint Petersburg, which included a drone, a large sum of money, and various military equipment.

However, subsequent developments in the war, including the deaths of several separatist commanders and the departure from Donbas of Girkin, whom Prosvirnin ideologically backed, ultimately led him to become completely disillusioned with the Russia's official position on the conflict. He maintained that the separatists had done everything in their power to achieve their goals but had failed due to circumstances beyond their control. He was sharply critical of Vladislav Surkov, the Kremlin's point man on Ukraine, arguing that neither Surkov nor representatives of the Russian President should be negotiating with Petro Poroshenko. Prosvirnin himself did not go to fight, explaining that he did not wish to be a "150-kilogram burden" and that his role as an agitator and propagandist seemed far more useful and therefore took priority. Nevertheless, until the end of his life, he continued to provide moral and financial support to pro-Russian forces in the Donbas, insisting that "history is not yet over" and that future confrontation was inevitable. In a 2017 interview with Echo of Moscow, he stated that the armed conflict could only end in one of two ways: either a victory for the people's republics followed by the overthrow of the Ukrainian government, or the total defeat of the Donbas separatists by the Ukrainian Armed Forces, which he predicted would be followed by mass killings of civilians.

== Legacy ==
In 2013, Prosvirnin was interviewed by the news website Slon.ru, the independent television channel TV Rain, and Afisha magazine. The outlet Sobaka, run by Veronika Belotserkovskaya, featured Prosvirnin in a piece titled "The New Power of the Runet".

In 2014, Prosvirnin appeared on TV Rain on Ksenia Sobchak's talk show, where he made a number of statements that, according to the host, could have permanently alienated the channel's Ukrainian audience. That same year, musician Alexander F. Sklyar recorded a song containing allusions to articles from Sputnik and Pogrom. One of Prosvirnin's texts was quoted on Channel One's news program by anchor Irada Zeynalova. However, Prosvirnin accused the anchor of plagiarism, and she was ultimately forced to apologize for quoting the article without proper context.

In 2017, Prosvirnin appeared on air for the radio stations Govorit Moskva (Sergey Dorenko's program) and Echo of Moscow. In June 2021, he appeared on Anton Krasovsky's talk show on RT to present his book Why America is Dying. He also made appearances on programs hosted by Sergey Minaev and Mikhail Svetov.

Yegor Kholmogorov called Prosvirnin "one of the voices of the Russian nation", a man possessed of visual and literary talents who knew how to invent "new formats for conveying old ideas", while also being capable of saying "terrible things for the sake of a catchy phrase". Some journalists compared Prosvirnin's popularity and influence to that of a rock star. Kholmogorov described Prosvirnin's death as the second major loss for the Russian nationalist movement after the death of Konstantin Krylov. He noted that Prosvirnin "died like a rock star" and left much unfinished just as Russia was, in his view, entering an era of needing to become a traditionalist state that could "rely only on its army and navy".

Conversely, Dmitry Demushkin claimed that Prosvirnin had "a mess in his head" and that he commented on every topic in his signature boorish and insulting manner. Oleg Kashin ranked Prosvirnin alongside such prominent figures as Eduard Limonov and Konstantin Krylov, arguing that his death negated "all his contentiousness and unbearable nature", leaving behind only a significant legacy and his influence on society. Kashin also wrote that Prosvirnin managed to restore a sense of "Russian identity" to a generation of young intelligentsia. Maksim Shevchenko called Prosvirnin a talented individual who mastered "the discourse and narrative of the postmodern era", but found his rhetoric absolutely hostile and described his life's path as a grotesque tragedy with a monstrous end, akin to a scene from Alexander Blok's play The Fairground Booth.

At the same time, according to Zakhar Prilepin, Prosvirnin's popularity had all but evaporated in the final years of his life.
