= Dmitry Galkovsky =

Russian writer, journalist, philosopher and blogger

Dmitry Yevgenyevich Galkovsky (Russian: Дмитрий Евгеньевич Галковский; born 4 June 1960, Moscow, USSR) is a Russian writer, journalist, philosopher, blogger, and YouTuber. He is best known as the author of the philosophical novel The Infinite Deadlock (Бесконечный тупик) and as the developer of the 'cryptocolony' conspiracy theory.

== Biography ==
Dmitry Galkovsky was born on 4 June 1960 in Moscow into a working‑class family. His father was an engineer at ZiL, and his mother was a tailor. Both of his parents came from families of Russian Orthodox clerics. He graduated from School No. 51 in Moscow in 1977.

In 1980, he enrolled in the evening division of the Philosophy Faculty at Moscow State University (specialising in the history of ancient philosophy), graduating in 1986. He could not find official employment and supported himself by illegally reproducing and selling banned literature.

== Major works ==
=== The Infinite Deadlock ===
(Alternative translations: Endless Dead‑end, Endless Impasse). Galkovsky's first major work was the philosophical novel Бесконечный тупик (The Infinite Deadlock). The work consists of three parts. The first part, completed in 1984 and entitled 'The Round World', is a brief analysis of, and homage to, the work of the Russian philosopher Vasily Rozanov. Rozanov's writings were not published during Soviet rule, and he had become somewhat obscure by the time Galkovsky was writing. 'The Round World' argues that Rozanov's work is "very modern and relevant" to Russia in the late 20th century, and that he is "perhaps … the most modern Russian philosopher."

The second part of The Infinite Deadlock, referred to as 'The Infinite Deadlock (main text)' in the third edition, is an essay (completed in 1985) that fleshes out many of the arguments made in 'The Round World'. In this work, Rozanov is placed in the broader context of 19th‑century Russian history and philosophy. The essay compares Rozanov favourably with writers such as Nikolai Chernyshevsky and Nikolai Berdyaev, whom Galkovsky views as 'infantile' and 'talkative'. Galkovsky argues that the Russian language is inherently highly amorphous, and that Russian culture is better adapted to faith (which is associated with 'silence') than to reason ('logos' or 'speech'). In this interpretation, the fragmented nature of Rozanov's later writing is the ideal expression of the Russian way of thinking.

The third part of The Infinite Deadlock is called 'Comments on "The Infinite Deadlock"' and consists of 949 'comments' (fragments of text ranging from one sentence to several pages in length). Each 'comment' is addressed to a single phrase, either from the 'main text' in the second part, or from an earlier comment. Thus, the comments have a tree structure, with one main branch commenting on the 'main text', and other smaller branches arising from comments in the main branch, forming a hypertext. The comments constitute the vast majority of the overall text of The Infinite Deadlock (the third part takes up 1,077 out of 1,230 pages in the third edition).

The fragmented, episodic nature of the comments resembles Rozanov's style of writing. However, although Rozanov provided the main inspiration for Galkovsky's work, he is only one of many subjects discussed in the third part of The Infinite Deadlock. The main topics covered by the hypertext include the following:

- An attack on the high status of Russian literature in Russian culture. Galkovsky believes that the doctrine of 'realism' adopted by Russian literature was a false front for a revolutionary agenda. In this interpretation, Russian literature uses a hyper‑real appearance to describe things that were not actually common in real life, and were often surreal inventions of the authors. For example, Galkovsky interprets the work of Nikolai Gogol as the author's own fantastic, irrational expression of the ambiguity of the Russian language, and concludes that Gogol's influence became irreparably harmful when this work was interpreted as a realistic criticism of Russian society. In general, Galkovsky argues against the idea that writers should have political and social influence.
- Historical revisionism of 19th‑century Russian history leading up to the Russian Revolution. Galkovsky argues that revolutionary movements were patronised, and often directly supervised, by the imperial police. He characterises the revolutionary movement, starting with the Decembrist revolt, as a series of 'double provocations' in which elements of the government deliberately sabotaged the government's own response to revolutionary acts. In his analysis, the revolution had become inevitable by the reign of Nicholas II owing to long‑standing treason at every level of the government. Galkovsky cites the pervasiveness of Freemasonry in Russian society and the influence of Jews in revolutionary movements, but he implies that their success was inspired and funded by European governments for the purpose of destroying the Russian monarchy.
- A discrediting of the character and work of the Russian philosopher Vladimir Solovyov, a key figure in Russian religious philosophy. Galkovsky portrays Solovyov as an opportunist who was largely ignorant of the Greek and Christian philosophy that he attempted to summarise in his work. The Infinite Deadlock implies that Solovyov's main goal was to create a caricatured form of conservatism that would draw attention away from more 'authentic' nationalist thinkers such as Yuri Samarin. Galkovsky expresses similar criticism of Nikolai Berdyaev, whom he views as a 20th‑century epigone of Solovyov.
- The nature of the Russian language itself. Galkovsky notes what he considers to be the amorphousness of the Russian language, building on the 'silence'/'speech' dichotomy put forth in the 'main text'. In his view, the ambiguity of language makes it difficult to create an unambiguous depiction of evil in a written work. He gives examples of works from Russian literature that use language to 'muffle' psychological or ideological conflicts.
- The author's own feelings of loneliness (Galkovsky refers to himself using his mother's maiden name 'Odinokov', meaning 'lonely one'), his childhood experiences, and his relationship with his father. These passages form a literary (often lyrical) counterpoint to the denser philosophical passages in the text. However, Galkovsky also implies that his experience is a natural outcome of the historical and literary developments he discusses throughout the novel.

Many other subjects are covered in passing, including the nature and purpose of philosophy, a discussion of Platonism and Aristotelianism, and an analysis of the characters of Anton Chekhov and Vladimir Lenin.

==== Critical reception ====
Parts of The Infinite Deadlock were published in the USSR in both the 'liberal' journal Novy Mir and the 'nationalist' periodical Nash Sovremennik. It sparked some interest and discussion in the press, though many official critics condemned the novel. The third edition of The Infinite Deadlock contains a selection of hypothetical critical reactions (written by Galkovsky himself) to the work, from across the ideological spectrum.

The Infinite Deadlock is also cited in:

- 'From Aleshkovsky to Galkovsky: the praise of folly in Russian prose since the 1960s' by Oxford research fellow Oliver Ready;
- New Realism, New Barbarism: Socialist Theory in the Era of Globalization by Boris Kagarlitsky;
- Russian Postmodernism by Mikhail Epstein, Aleksandr Genis, and Slobodanka Vladiv‑Glover;
- After the Fall: 1989 and the Future of Freedom by George N. Katsiaficas; and
- Scientific Bodies in Motion by Vladimir David Shkolnikov.

The novel has not been translated into English. The complicated structure of the hypertext, and Galkovsky's heavy use of conversational idioms, make English translation difficult.

In 1997, Galkovsky was awarded the Anti‑Booker Prize for The Infinite Deadlock, but he refused the monetary award. He explained his refusal in an essay later published in the collection Propaganda.

To this day, The Infinite Deadlock remains Galkovsky's best‑known and most expansive work. However, despite the critical acclaim it has received, it has never been published by any Soviet or post‑Soviet organisation, and every edition released so far has been self‑published by Galkovsky. The first edition was released in 1997, nine years after the novel was completed. The third edition was released in 2007 by a publishing house expressly founded by Galkovsky for this purpose. (ISBN 978-5-902466-01-7)

=== Duckspeak ===
Galkovsky compiled an anthology of 'typical' Soviet poetry, using the Orwellian term Уткоречь (Duckspeak) as its title. It was first published online in 1997 and in print in 2002. In the introduction, Galkovsky argues that earlier anthologies of Soviet poetry featured a disproportionately large number of Russian Silver Age poets, whose aesthetic views were largely carried over from pre‑revolutionary times and were rejected by the Soviet order. Furthermore, in Galkovsky's opinion, a truly 'representative' collection should include the most 'typical' poems in a certain category, rather than the 'best' ones. Thus, Duckspeak samples many obscure and provincial Soviet poets in addition to more acclaimed ones.

The poems are categorised by subject. The subjects covered by the anthology include:

- 'Love for the Three Mandarins' (poems extolling Vladimir Lenin and Joseph Stalin);
- 'Kukushkin' (poems about Alexander Pushkin and Russian literature in general);
- 'Friendship of Nations' (poems extolling the Soviet doctrine of proletarian internationalism);
- 'The Soviet Woman' (poems expressing Soviet images of the ideal woman); and
- 'Enemies' (poems attacking capitalism and capitalist countries).

The size of each section is intended to mirror the frequency of the section's topic in Soviet poetry.

=== Friend of Ducklings ===
In 2002, Galkovsky wrote a film script called 'Friend of Ducklings' (Друг Утят). The screenplay tells a futuristic (both utopian and dystopian) story describing a technologically advanced, robotised post‑nuclear age. The script was written at the request of the filmmaker Vladimir Menshov but has never been adapted. 'Friend of Ducklings' was widely reviewed throughout the Russian press; Galkovsky's comments on some of the reviews can be found in Magnet.

=== Propaganda and Magnet ===
In 2003–2004, Galkovsky published two collections of essays, articles, and interviews, entitled Propaganda (Пропаганда) and Magnet (Магнит). These collections include Galkovsky's analysis of Soviet philosophy, entitled 'The Broken Compass Points the Way' (Разбитый компас указывает путь), his explanation for his refusal of the monetary component of the Anti‑Booker Prize, and other writings. Around this time, many of Galkovsky's short stories (from the series Svyatochnye Rasskazy and Skazki Druga Utyat) were published in both online and offline media.

=== Two Idiots ===
In 2009, Galkovsky published another collection of essays, entitled Two Idiots (Два идиота). The core of the book consists of articles written by Galkovsky between 2005 and 2007 for the online newspaper Vzglyad and the magazine Russkaya Zhizn. The title refers to Konstantin Rykov, Russian publisher and editor of Vzglyad, and Dmitry Olshansky, editor of Russkaya Zhizn. The book was published through Galkovsky's own publishing house.

== Cryptocolony ==
Galkovsky formulated the concept of a cryptocolony (Russian: криптоколония): a nominally sovereign state secretly controlled and exploited by an external superpower (the 'metropolis'). In his historical revisionist writings, he asserts that after the 1917 collapse of the Russian Empire, the Soviet Union functioned as a British cryptocolony. He argues that the Bolshevik leaders, including Vladimir Lenin, were influenced by British intelligence to serve the geopolitical interests of the British Empire.

== Journalism ==
=== Articles and columns ===
During the 1990s, Galkovsky decided to boycott post‑Soviet media as a result of his inability to publish The Infinite Deadlock, which he believed was caused by an organised campaign against him. (His account of this campaign was later published in Propaganda.) After that, his interviews and articles began to appear in various publications:

- Nezavisimaya Gazeta (short stories from the Svyatochnye Rasskazy and Skazki Druga Utyat series);
- Literaturnaya Gazeta;
- Zavtra;
- Conservator
- Vzglyad.ru (columnist, 2005–2006); and
- Russkaya Zhizn (columnist, 2007).

=== Galkovsky.Livejournal.com ===
In 2003, Galkovsky started a LiveJournal blog, covering a wide range of topics in history, culture, and politics. His blog has gained recognition in the Russian blogosphere and regularly appears on various lists of the most popular blogs.

=== Ducks' Truth magazine ===
Galkovsky has participated in the creation of a website parodying the typical style of youth movements in the 20th century. Members of the 'Ducklings' movement are encouraged to participate in massively multiplayer online games. Between 2005 and 2007, the movement published the online magazine Ducks' Truth (Утиная Правда), a parody of Pravda, co‑founded in 2004 by Galkovsky and the Russian counterculture publisher Konstantin Rykov. The magazine contained many articles on history and politics, written by Galkovsky under his 'Friend of Ducklings' pseudonym.

The original website of the magazine has now closed, but the content has been archived by a Galkovsky fansite. In 2011, the magazine was reopened under the name New Ducks' Truth.

== Awards ==
- Anti-Booker literary prize (1997); declined to accept the monetary award.
- Rykov LiveJournal prize (2006) in the 'Best Comments of the Year' category.

== Legacy ==
Among political scientists, Galkovsky is regarded as a theoretician of Russian nationalism and an intellectual inspiration for other prominent figures within the Russian nationalist movement, notably Konstantin Krylov and Egor Prosvirnin.

One of the central characters in Victor Pelevin's novels Methuselah's Lamp, or The Last Battle of the Chekists and Masons (2016), The Art of Light Touches(2019 and The Return of Bluebeard (2026) is Konstantin Parakletovich Golgofsky, a philosopher and historian specialising in Freemasonry and the author of a fictional 2,000‑page philosophical‑erotic treatise. He investigates and exposes a universal conspiracy while unveiling the essence of a new information war between Russia and the United States. In the third part of Pelevin's novel Methuselah's Lamp, or The Last Battle of the Chekists and Masons, the narrative recounts a supposedly scholarly article by Professor Golgofsky concerning exiled Freemasons who constructed a portal on Novaya Zemlya in an attempt to contact God, thereby acquiring supernatural abilities and giving rise to the entire Soviet criminal underworld subculture.

According to a 2009 poll conducted by the website OpenSpace.ru, which garnered over 40,000 votes, Galkovsky was ranked 12th among Russia's most influential public intellectuals, placing ahead of the novelist Boris Akunin, the journalist Vladimir Pozner Jr., the satirist Viktor Shenderovich, and other prominent figures from the creative intelligentsia.
