= Vasily Slonov =

Vasily Slonov (17 September 1969) is a Russian political artist. He lives and works in Krasnoyarsk, Siberia.

Slonov gained fame in the west in 2013 when his exhibition of Welcome! Sochi 2014 was shut down by the Russian authorities and the Perm Museum of Contemporary Art director sacked.

== Life and work ==
Slonov was born on 17 September 1969 in the village of Shushenskoe, Shushensky District of Krasnoyarsk Krai, Russia. In 1984 he became a student of the Department of Design at Surikov Krasnoyarsk College of Arts. Between 1988 and 1990 he did military service in the Soviet Army.

In June 2013 Slonov's Welcome! Sochi 2014, which satirised the 2014 Winter Olympics in Sochi, was to be exhibited as part of the White Nights citywide arts festival in Perm, organised by Marat Gelman. The authorities shut down the show shortly after its launch but Gelman moved it to Perm Museum of Contemporary Art, where it was also shut down. The authorities concluded that the works were extremist, and sacked Gelman.

== Exhibitions ==
- 2015: Mosquitoes exhausting the oil, the blood of the Earth, installation on a bank of the Yenisei River, Krasnoyarsk, Russia, 25 February 2015 (ahead of the opening of the Krasnoyarsk Economic Forum, 26 February 2015).
- 2015: Quilted Cavaliers of the Apocalypse, 11.12 Gallery, Moscow.
- 2015: Erarta Contemporary Art Gallery, London.
- 2015: Quilted Heart and Cotton Bell / Russian Alarm Bell, 11th Krasnoyarsk Museum Biennale, Krasnoyarsk Museum Centre, Krasnoyarsk, Russia.
