= Electoral history of Pavel Grudinin =

Elections featuring Russian politician

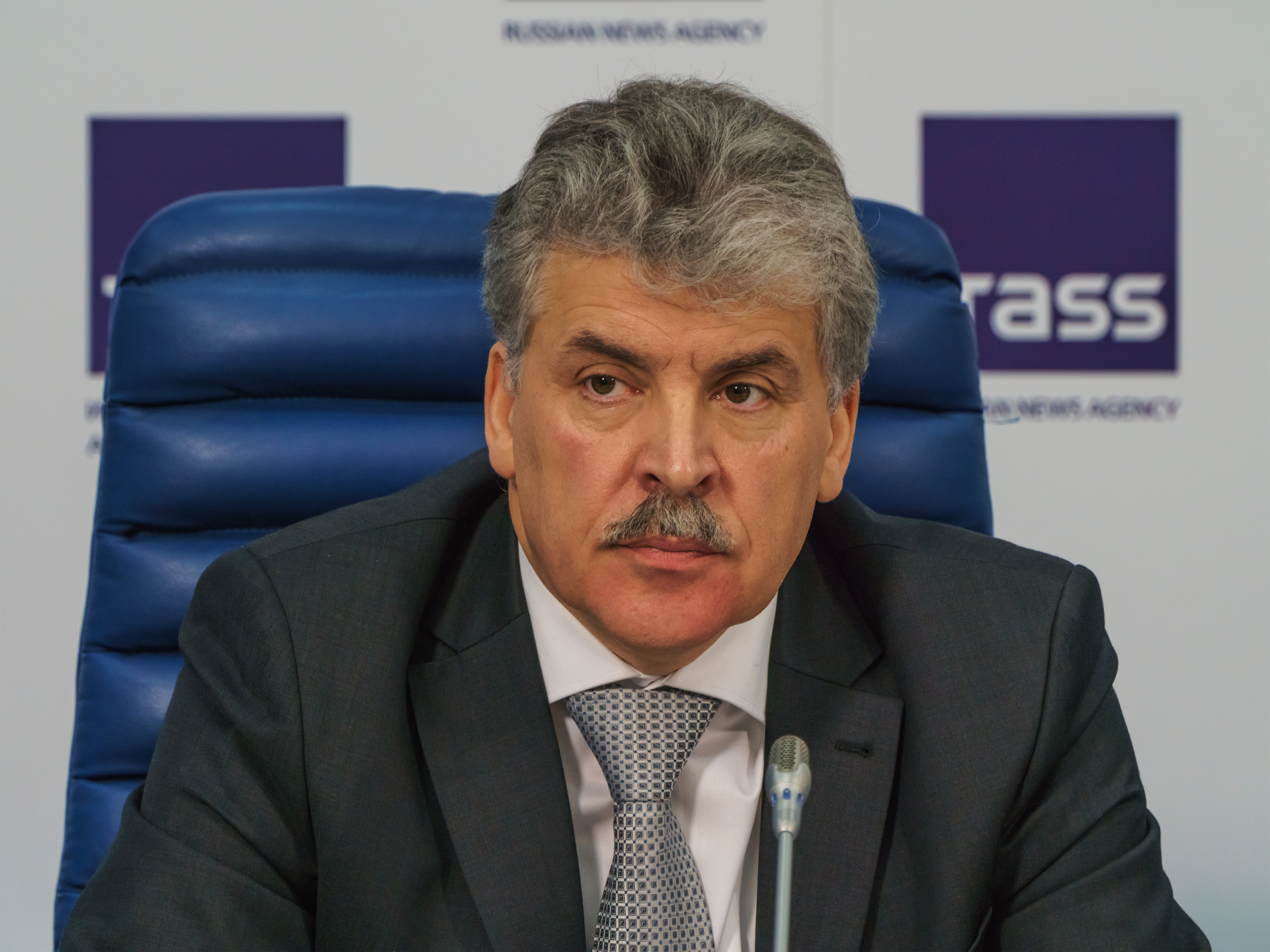
Pavel Grudinin

Electoral history of Pavel Grudinin, Russian politician and entrepreneur. Communist party presidential candidate 2018.

== Moscow Oblast Duma ==
=== 1997 ===
2nd constituency:

- Pavel Grudinin — 14,346 (38.2%)
- Tatyana Rublyova — 8,577 (22.84%)
- Alexander Gusev — 4,348 (11.58%)
- Mikhail Tkach — 2,463 (6.56%)
- Alexander Guskov — 2,128 (5.67%)
- Against All — 3,630 (10.23%)

=== 2002 ===
2nd constituency:

- Pavel Grudinin — 16,120 (44.76%)
- Lyubov Seleznyova — 8,052 (22.36%)
- Alexander Levchenko — 4,271 (11.86%)
- Nikolay Ageev — 1,240 (3.44%)
- Anatoly Voyevodin — 952 (2.64%)
- Valery Kharlamov — 352 (0.98%)
- Yelena Kosolapova — 229 (0.64%)
- Against All — 3,316 (9.21%)

== 2016 legislative election ==
121st (Lyubertsy) constituency
Candidate	Party	Votes	%
Lidiya Antonova	United Russia	103,949	51.2%
Pavel Grudinin	Communist Party	27,711	13.6%
Igor Chistyukhin	A Just Russia	19,886	9.8%
Andrey Khromov	Liberal Democratic Party	18,304	9.0%
Viktor Balabanov	Yabloko	9,093	4.5%
Viktor Banov	Communists of Russia	6,222	3.1%
Vladimir Laktyushin	Rodina	5,766	2.8%
Lyudmila Tropina	Patriots of Russia	5,336	2.6%
Oleg Solsky	Party of Growth	3,686	1.8%
Vitaly Ozherelyev	Greens	3,196	1.6%

== 2017 Vidnoye Council of Deputies election ==
6th constituency:

- Pavel Grudinin — 537 (73.6%)
- Valery Nifantyev — 161 (22.1%)
- Alexey Voronin — 16 (2.2%)
- Irina Kashtanova — 15 (2.1%)
- Yury Gusarev — 1 (0.1%)

== Speaker of the Vidnoye Council of Deputies ==
=== 2017 election ===
Grudinin was the only candidate. Of the 20 deputies, 14 were present.

- Pavel Grudinin — 14

=== 2019 dismissal ===
On February 15, 2019, a vote was held to remove Grudinin from office. Of the 20 deputies, 19 were present.

- For dismissal — 11
- Against dismissal — 7
- Abstained — 1

== 2018 presidential election ==
=== Left Front primary ===
Candidate	Party	First round		Second round	
Candidate	Party	Votes	%	Votes	%
Pavel Grudinin	Independent	2,440	14.4	4,086	58.4
Yury Boldyrev	Independent	2,536	14.9	2,908	41.6
Konstantin Syomin	Independent	1,539	9.1		
Sergey Glazyev	Independent	1,460	8.5		
Zakhar Prilepin	Independent	1,183	7.0		
Sergey Shargunov	Independent	766	4.5		
Mikhail Popov	Independent	442	2.6		
Boris Kagarlitsky	Independent	416	2.5		
Maksim Shevchenko	Independent	410	2.4		
Valery Rashkin	Communist Party	373	2.2		
Zhores Alferov	Communist Party	353	2.1		
Mikhail Delyagin	A Just Russia	333	2.0		
Other 65 candidates, each of whom received less than 2%		4722	27.8		
Total		16,973	100	6,994	100
Source: leftfront.org

=== Communist Party nomination ===
For		Against	
314	96.6%	11	3.4%

=== General election ===
Results of Pavel Grudinin by federal subjects

2018 presidential election
Candidates	Party	Votes	%
Vladimir Putin	Independent	56,430,712	76.69
Pavel Grudinin	Communist Party	8,659,206	11.77
Vladimir Zhirinovsky	Liberal Democratic Party	4,154,985	5.65
Ksenia Sobchak	Civic Initiative	1,238,031	1.68
Grigory Yavlinsky	Yabloko	769,644	1.05
Boris Titov	Party of Growth	556,801	0.76
Maxim Suraykin	Communists of Russia	499,342	0.68
Sergey Baburin	Russian All-People's Union	479,013	0.65
Source: CEC
