= Gleb Pavlovsky =

Russian political scientist (1951–2023)

- Глеб Павловский
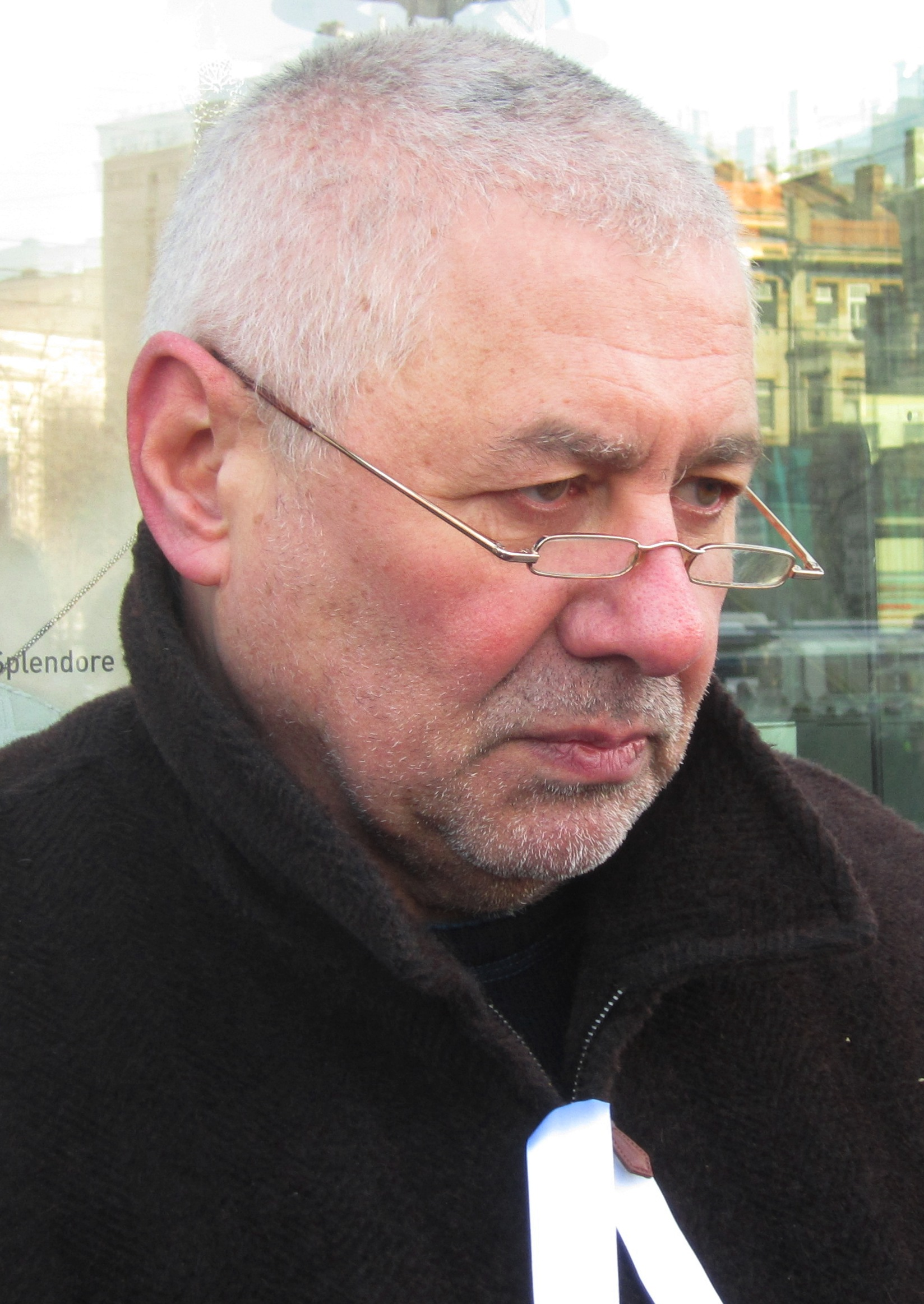
- Pavlovsky in 2012
- Born: Gleb Olegovich Pavlovsky; 5 March 1951; Odesa, Ukrainian SSR, Soviet Union
- Died: 27 February 2023 (aged 71); Moscow, Russia
- Citizenship: Soviet Union; Russia
- Education: Odesa University
- Occupations: Journalist; political scientist
- Known for: Human rights activism
- Awards: Order "For Merit to the Fatherland"

Gleb Olegovich Pavlovsky (Russian: Глеб Олегович Павловский; 5 March 1951 – 27 February 2023) was a Russian political scientist who also described himself as a "political technologist". During the Soviet era, he was prosecuted as a dissident. From 1996 to 2011, he was a political adviser to Vladimir Putin. After that, he became a critic of the Russian government.

Pavlovsky was president of the Foundation for Effective Politics (FEP). In 1997, he helped create "Russian Journal", one of Russia's oldest websites. Pavlovsky and FEP organized and financed many early websites on the Runet, including Lenta.ru. From 2005 to 2008, Pavlovsky hosted the weekly television news commentary "Real Politics", which was shown on NTV Russia at 10:00 p.m. on Saturdays. In 2012, he became editor-in-chief of the Russian-language blog Gefter.ru.

== Biography ==
Pavlovsky was born in Odesa in Ukraine on 5 March 1951 in a family of engineers. From 1968 to 1973, he studied history at Odesa University. His first publication (in a university newspaper) was censored by the Politburo because of its alleged "anarchistic and left- extremist mood".

At the age of 21, Pavlovsky and friends organized a political commune "Субъект Исторической Деятельности" (Subject of Historical Action), inspired by the spirit of the protests of 1968 and ideals of intellectual Marxism (at the time, he described himself as a "Zen Marxist"). At this stage, Pavlovsky began to increase his links to the dissident movement in Odesa. In the 1970s, he went to Moscow to meet fellow dissidents: Mikhail Gefter, Genrikh Batishev, Grigory Pomerants, and other associates. He first came into contact with the KGB in 1974.

As the 1970s went on, Pavlovsky cemented his place in Moscow's dissident movement and began publishing an underground newspaper entitled "Poiski", all while avoiding KGB interference. In 1982, he was arrested for anti-Soviet activity and sentenced to three years in exile in the Komi Republic. Before the trial, he initially collaborated with the authorities, although during the trial he disowned his testimony. In Komi, he made a living as a house painter and stoker. By 1985, he had returned to civilian life in Moscow, where he was able to pursue further engagements.

Between 1996 and 2011, Pavlovsky worked closely with Vladimir Putin as a Kremlin adviser and political strategist during Putin's initial tenure as president and prime minister. He was instrumental in the development of managed democracy in Russia at this time.

Pavlovsky was fired from this position in the spring of 2011.

He became a critic of the Russian government. In a 2012 interview, he said he did not expect Putin to stay in power beyond 2018.

Pavlovsky died on 27 February 2023, aged 71, after a long and serious illness.

== Media ==
- 1991—1992 — vice chair of "Kommersant" publishing house.
- 1994—1995 — editor-in-chief quarterly published magazine "Переделы Власти"
- 1995—1996 — founder and co-editor of "Sreda" magazine.
- 1995—2009 — co-creator of Foundation of Effective Politics (Russian: «Фонд эффективной политики», along with Maxim Meyer and Marat Gelman).
- 1997—co-founder and editor-in-chief of internet magazine "Russian journal".
- 2005 — co-founder and editor of "Europe" publishing house.
- April 2012 — founder and editor-in-chief of the Gefter.ru blog named after the Russian and Soviet historian Mikhail Gefter (1918–1995).
