= Perm Museum of Contemporary Art =

Museum in Perm, Perm Krai, Russia

Perm Museum of Contemporary Art (PERMM)
- Пермский музей современного искусства (ПЕРММ)

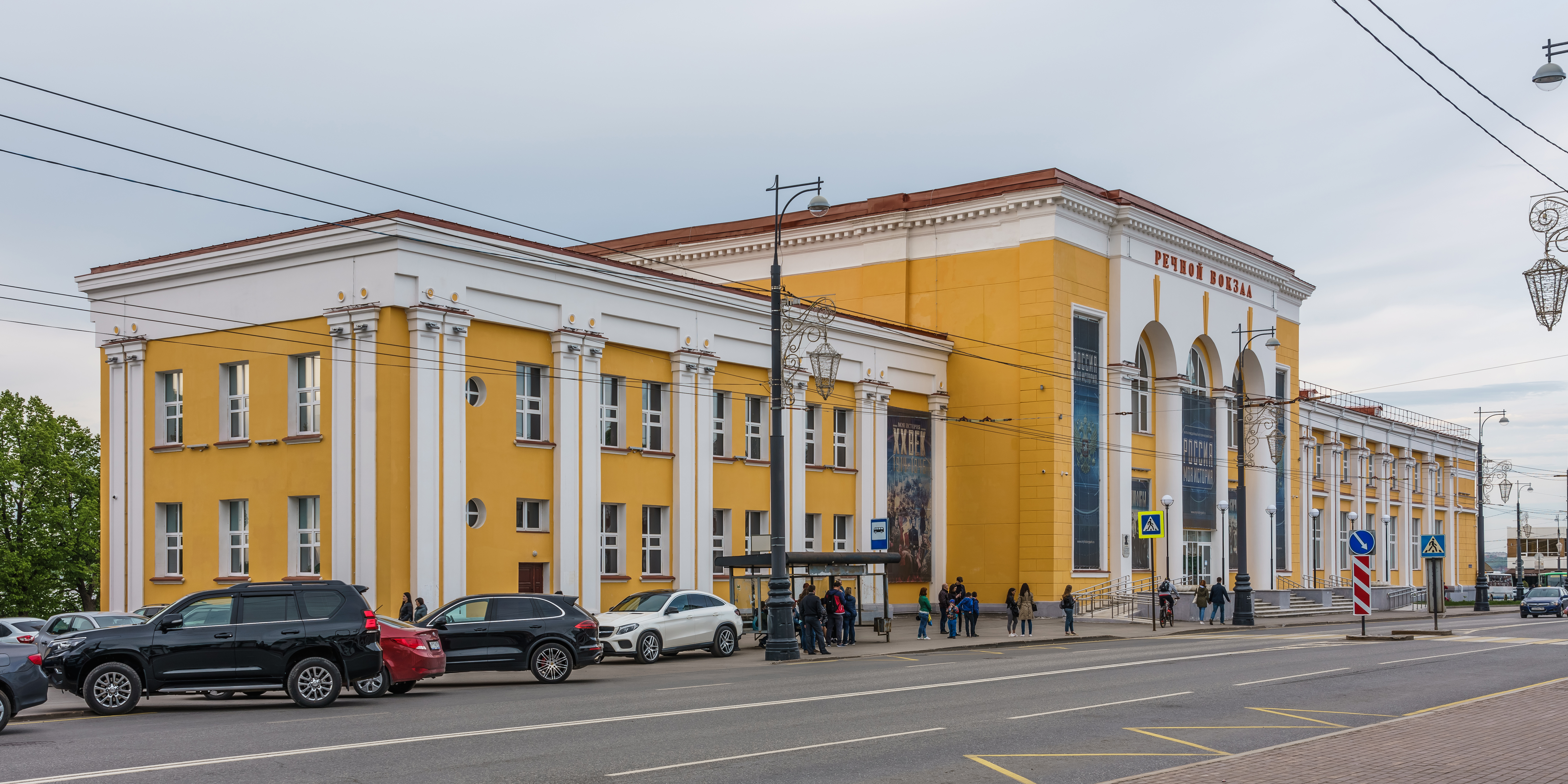
- Established: 2009
- Location: 24 Gagarina Boulevard, Perm, Perm Krai, Russia
- Coordinates: 58.016375°N 56.278846°E
- Founder: Marat Gelman
- Director: Yelena Petrova
- Website: www.permm.ru

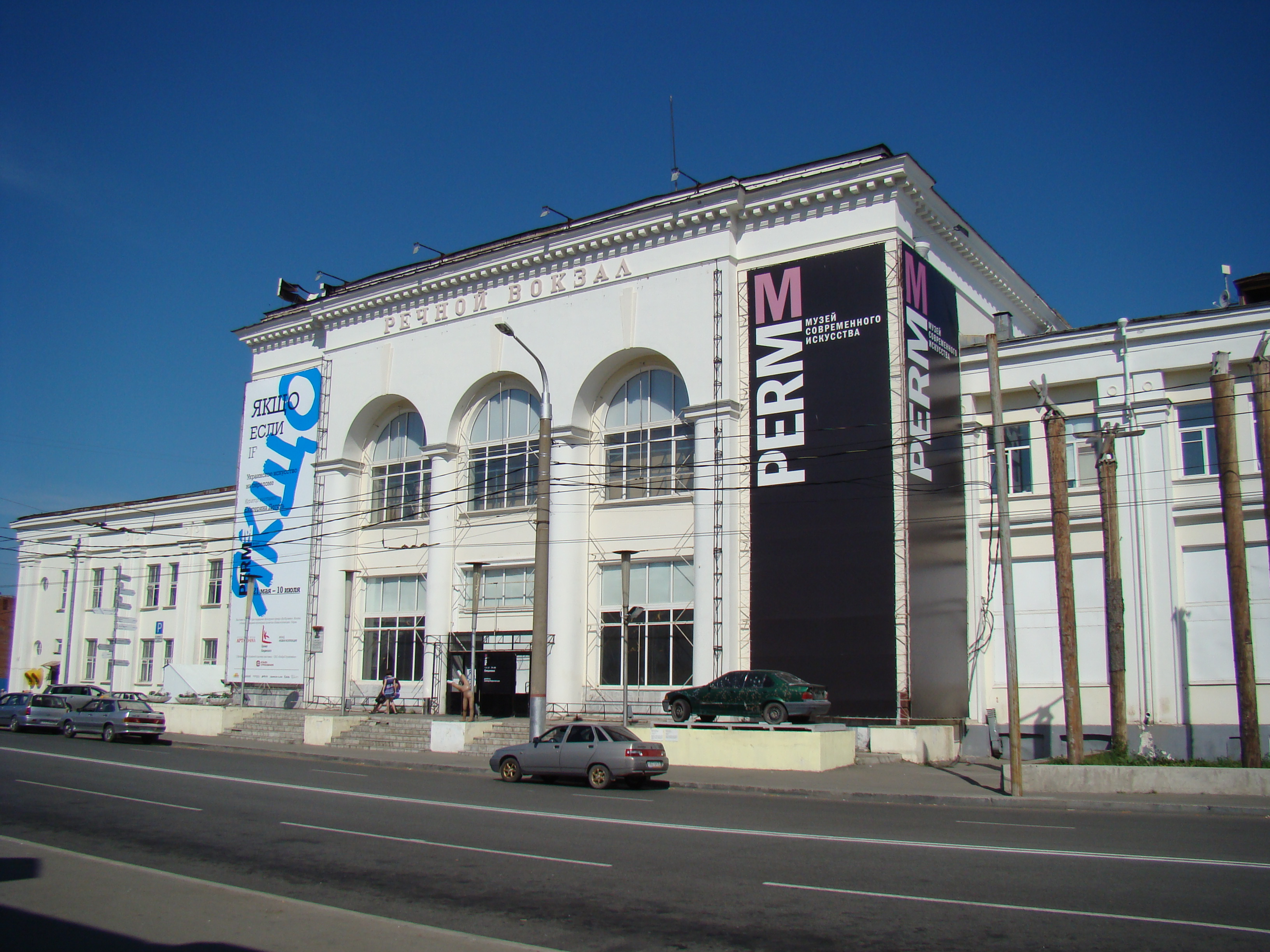
Perm River Station Hall where PERMM was previously located

Perm Museum of Contemporary Art (PERMM) (Russian: Пермский музей современного искусства (ПЕРММ)) is an art gallery in Perm, Perm Krai, Russia, that officially opened in spring 2009. It holds changing exhibitions, festivals, artist talks, lectures, workshops, concerts and performances. It is housed in a former tram depot at 24 Gagarina Boulevard. Yelena Petrova is its director.

Perm Museum of Contemporary Art was devised by and is the legacy of its former founder, director and curator Marat Gelman. Gelman was sacked in June 2013 amid fallout over showing Vasily Slonov's exhibition Welcome! Sochi 2014 that satirised the 2014 Winter Olympics in Sochi. Before this, in 2010, the Financial Times praised PERMM as "one of the most spectacular galleries of modern art in Russia."

PERMM, Perm State Art Gallery and Perm Krai Museum are situated close to each other and form a museum complex. The museum was previously housed in the former Stalinist ferry building, known as the Perm River Station Hall on the banks of the Kama River but had to move as the building was unsafe.

== History ==
Perm Museum of Contemporary Art was initially housed in the former Stalinist ferry building, known as the Perm River Station Hall. The building was built in 1940, at 2 Ordzhonikidze Street, opposite Perm-I railway station and on the banks of the Kama River. The museum had to vacate this building as it was too unsafe, requiring renovation. It moved into a nearby former tram depot at 24 Gagarina Boulevard.

The museum was devised by and is the legacy of its former founder, director and curator, Moscow gallery owner Marat Gelman. Gelman was spearheading a cultural revolution in the industrial city of Perm, which had a liberal political climate compared with the "throwback authoritarianism" elsewhere in Russia. The driving force behind the Perm culture project, as it was known, was Oleg Chirkunov, governor of the Perm region from 2004. The museum was an important part of this transformation. Chirkunov was replaced by Viktor Basargin, "an ally of President Vladimir Putin", in 2012.

In 2013, Vasily Slonov's Welcome! Sochi 2014 was to be exhibited as part of the White Nights city-wide arts festival organised by Gelman. The show gathered artworks deemed by Russian censors to ridicule the 2014 Winter Olympics in Sochi, and Stalin. The authorities shut down the show shortly after its launch but Gelman moved it to PERMM. The authorities concluded that the works were extremist, and sacked Gelman.

Gelman was replaced by Yelena Oleynikova, who was also dismissed within weeks "for agreeing to host a forum with civil society organisation Pilorama on the grounds of the museum". Yelena Petrova has been its director since December 2013.

== Directors ==
- Marat Gelman – 2008–2013
- Yelena Oleynikova – 2013
- Yelena Petrova – December 2013
- Nailya Allakhverdiyeva – 2019
