= Maxim Meyer =

Russian political scientist

Maksim Mikhailovich Meyer
- Born: 23 May 1967 (age 59); Moscow, USSR
- Occupations: Politician, scientist

Maxim Mikhailovich Meyer (Russian: Максим Михайлович Мейер, born 23 May 1967 in Moscow) is a Russian politician and statesman, social and political scientist specializing in political history of the Post-Soviet states. His father, Mikhail Meyer, is the former Director of Institute of Asian and African Countries of the Moscow State University (MSU). His grandfather was the prominent Soviet sinologist Rudolf Vyatkin.

One of the creators of the Foundation for Effective Politics (FEP) established in 1995, along with Gleb Pavlovsky and Marat Gelman. The FEP, mostly active in late 1990s and early 2000s, was a political think tank responsible for a number of electoral campaigns which included presidential campaign of Vladimir Putin in 2000.

== Scientific activities ==
M. M. Meyer graduated from Russian State University for the Humanities (RSUH) with the specialization of "archivist historian". He defended his PhD thesis in 2001 at the Institute of Sociology of Russian Academy of Sciences. Was a lecturer at the Department of Regional Politics of the Faculty of World Politics at Moscow State University; as well as at the Department of Countries of Post-Soviet Foreign Space at RSUH. A professor at the Department of UNESCO at the Faculty of politology and foreign relations at Russian State Social University, lecturer at the Faculty of Political science of MSU.

== Social activities ==
He began his social activities as a participant of Russian informal social movements of the 1980s. He was involved in actions such as Club of Social Initiatives, clubs called "Perestroika", "Democratic perestroika", "Moscow tribune". Had publications in newspapers such as Moskovskiye Novosti, Nezavisimaya Gazeta, Kommersant, "XX century & world" magazine. Authored a handbook of political Science centres (1992), co-authored a guide to political parties.

In 1989 he participated in creation of the first Russian Federation's information agency called Postfactum, as well as in creation of Kommersant weekly newspaper. In 1995 became a co-founder of the abovementioned FEP in which he was appointed a Director since 1997. When working at FEP, he participated in a number of its political campaigns: electoral rally of Congress of Russian Communities at Gosduma elections in 1995; presidential campaign of Boris Yeltsin prior to 1996 Russian presidential election; Sergey Kiriyenko's "New Force" movement's campaign during 1999 Russian legislative election as well as Unity party campaign. In 2000 he worked for Vladimir Putin's campaign prior to 2000 Russian presidential election.

In 2007–2011 he served as the Director of CIS-related programs at Russkiy Mir Foundation. Also collaborated with Public Opinion Foundation (FOM) and Expert Institute of Social Research (EISR).

== State activities ==
II Class Acting State Counselor according to Russian Federation Class Rank system. In July 2000 was appointed the Deputy of the Chief of the General Department of the Domestic Policy of the President of Russia (resigned in December 2001). In 2003 run for Gosduma prior to 2003 Russian legislative election at single-mandate electoral district №136. Served as deputy assistant for several Gosduma deputies, as well as assistant of First Deputy of the Chairman of the Federation Council of the Russian Federation.

Chairman of the Expert-consulting Council of the Rossotrudnichestvo. Participant of the Russian-Turkish Forum of Communities. Since 2018, an Advisor of the Minister of Economic Development of Russia.
