= Russkaya Zhizn =

Russkaya Zhizn (Русская жизнь, Russian Life) was a Left-Cadet legal daily, published in St. Petersburg, Russia, from January 14, 1907. On February 27, from its thirty-eighth issue, the newspaper was taken over by the Mensheviks; its contributors included Pavel Axelrod, F. I. Dan, V. I. Zasulich, L. Martov, G.V. Plekhanov. The newspaper was banned on March 15, 1907.
