= Russian Journal (website) =

Russian Journal (Russian: Русский журнал) is a primarily Russian language online publication founded by political scientist Gleb Pavlovsky and others. It was the first Russian political tribune in the Internet. It is a daily online publication devoted to cultural, political and social issues in Russia. It is a non-profit, educational project. For more information, please read the Letter from the Editor. The original Russian Journal was founded on July 14, 1997. The English version was launched in December 2001. Its chief sections are: On Reading, Politics, Entertainment, Web Stylistics and Essays & Views.

The Russian Journal is a project of the Russian Institute, an autonomous non-profit institution founded by private individuals and the Vek XX I Mir magazine. The Russian Journal is registered at the Russian Federation State Printing Committee - certificate # 016788 was issued on November 14, 1997. The project is financed by citizens of the Russian Federation on a non-commercial basis.
