= Marat Gelman =

Russian collector, gallerist, and op-ed columnist

- Марат Гельман
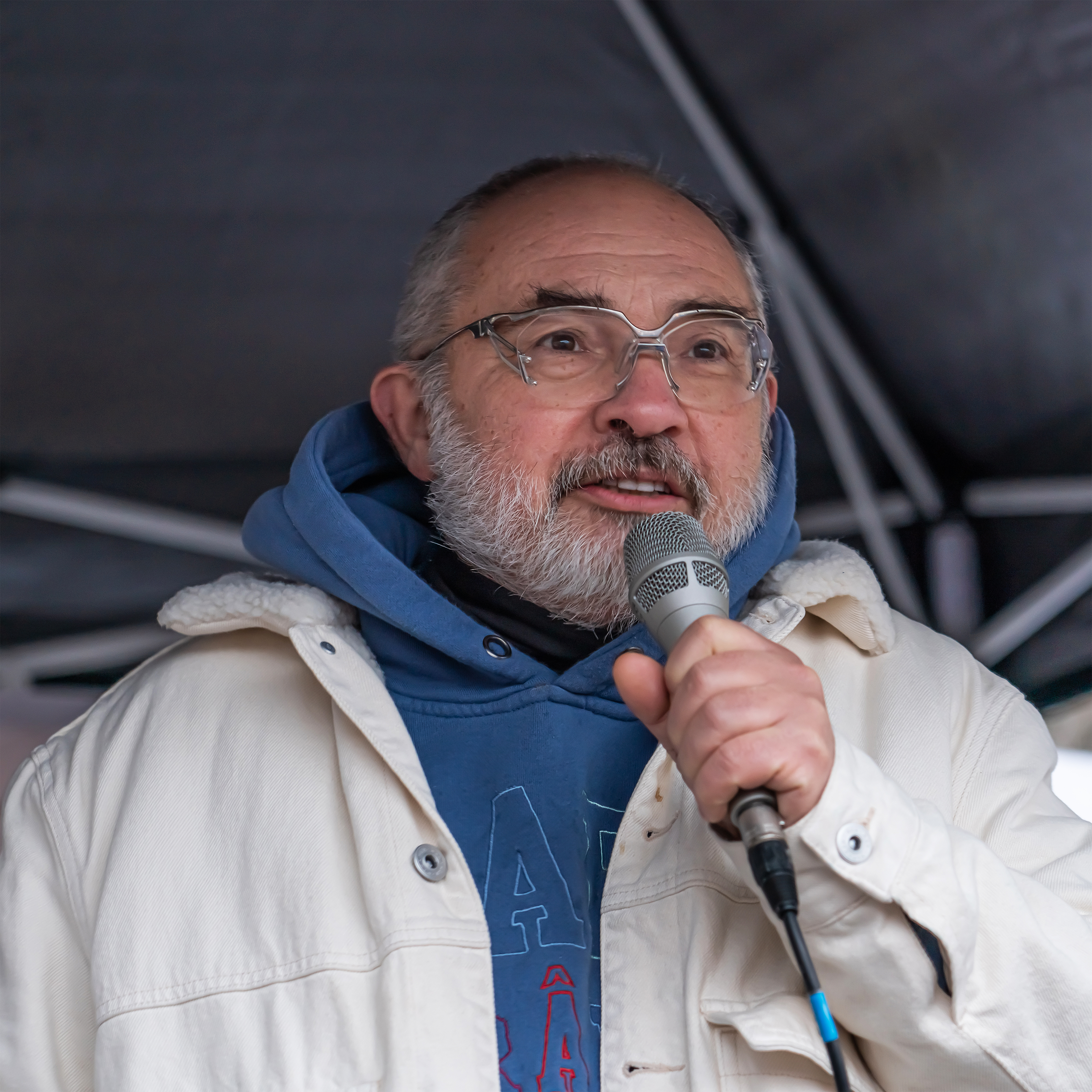
- Gelman in 2023
- Born: Marat Aleksandrovich Gelman; 24 December 1960 (age 65); Chişinău, Moldavian SSR, Soviet Union
- Citizenship: Russia; Moldova; Israel
- Occupations: Gallerist, collector, op-ed columnist, art manager, political consultant
- Father: Alexander Isaakovich Gelman
- Marat Gelman's voice Recorded May 2013
- Website: http://guelman.ru

Marat Aleksandrovich Gelman (Note: Official (in the passport) Latin-graphics spelling of his last name is Guelman as in French.) (Russian: Марат Александрович Гельман; Romanian: Marat Ghelman; born 24 December 1960) is a Russian collector, gallerist, and op-ed columnist. The former director of PERMM contemporary art museum in Perm. The deputy director of Channel One from June 2002 to February 2004. A political consultant, a co-founder of the Foundation for Effective Politics, and a member of Russia's Public Chamber (2010–2012 convocation). Gelman has lived in Montenegro since 2014.

== Biography ==
Marat Guelman was born on 24 December 1960 in Chişinău. His father is the writer and playwright Alexander Isaakovich Gelman. Upon finishing high school 34 in Chişinău in 1977, Marat Guelman went on to study at Moscow Electrotechnical Institute of Communications while working as a mechanic and a sceneshifter at Moscow Academic Art Theater, Sovremennik and Mayakovsky Theatre. He graduated in 1983 earning a degree in engineering.

Guelman worked as an engineer in Chişinău until 1986. After the Soviet era criminal rule on social parasitism was abolished on 1 March 1986, he quit his job to write a novel and to start his own business.

In 1987, Guelman, who had had an interest in art and specifically in contemporary art since his early youth, made his very first art exhibition, displaying the works of Moscow artists in Chişinău. The exhibition was a major success, in terms of both publicity and finance. When he came to Moscow to hand over to the artists the paintings and the money earned from sales, Guelman decided to stay in the capital.

He started his career in arts as a collector, however, having made poor choices for his first collection due to lack of experience he had no choice but to acquire the skills of selling artworks thus becoming the first art dealer in the USSR. In 1990, upon finishing his contemporary art studies abroad, he put together a collection of Ukrainian art, which became the core of South Russian Wave exhibition, shown in 1992, which caught the attention of the public and resulted in major feedback.(Later Ukrainian artists of the "South Wave" began to exhibit independently under the name Ukrainian New Wave).

Guelman himself describes his path into art and his career in art as a series of accidents. However, he believes this flexibility and open-mindedness in taking chances to be even more important for success than determination.

In 1995, Guelman became one of the creators of the Foundation for Effective Politics (FEP), along with Gleb Pavlovsky and Maxim Meyer.

In 2014, Guelman moved to Montenegro to implement cultural projects in this country. That was also the year when Dukley European Art Community residency program was launched by Neil Emilfarb, Petar Cukovic, and Guelman. The residency program was initially invitation-based, however, it is now open to all artists through an application system. The results of the artists’ work are exhibited on a regular basis. The activities of the residency program have been gradually making significant changes to the cultural status of Kotor, the city hosting the project, and to all of Montenegro. Marat Guelman has chosen this country to further advance and implement his concept of post-economy society and humanitarian engineering

On 30 December 2021, Russia's Ministry of Justice added Gelman to its list of "foreign agents". While living in Montenegro, Gelman continues to maintain good relations with the artists who have exhibited in his gallery. He and Ukrainian curator Kostyantyn Doroshenko recently drew public attention to Illya Chichkan’s Psychodarwinism project.

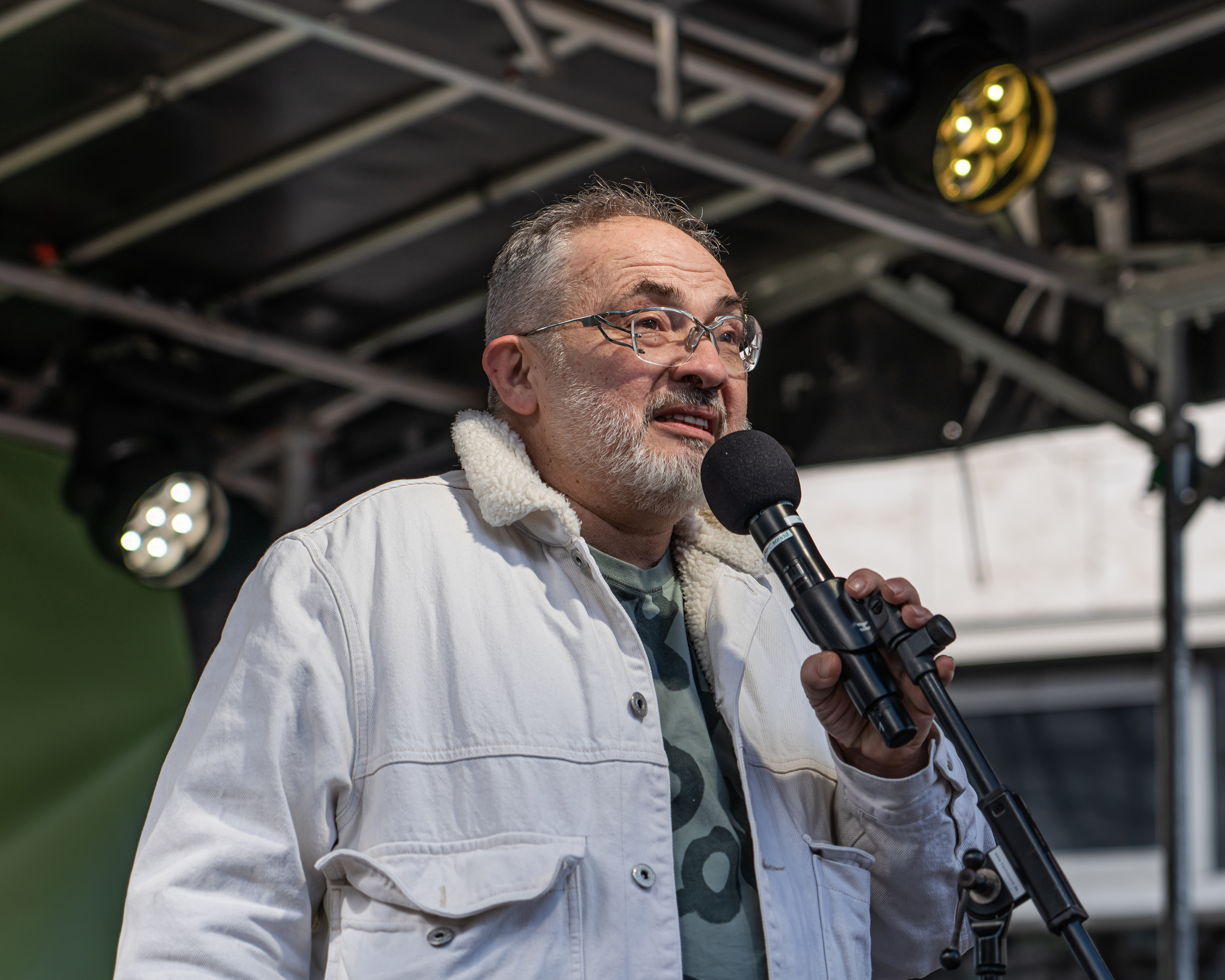
Gelman speaking at a Russian rally on Noon Against Putin in front of the Embassy of Russia, Berlin, 17 March 2024

On 20 December 2022, he was put on the wanted list under a criminal article, the article is not specified. He visited the Republic of Moldova in 2022 after an absence of 35 years. He had a meeting with the then Minister of Culture Sergiu Prodan. On 17 June 2022 he met with Moldovan president Maia Sandu.

Guelman openly opposed the Russian invasion of Ukraine. He supports the accession of Moldova to the European Union.

== Guelman Gallery ==
In 1990, Guelman opened his gallery, one of the first Russian private contemporary art galleries. The gallery worked until 2012, changing a few names during its 20-year-long history (Gallery Guelman, M. Guelman Gallery, M. and Y. Guelman Gallery). It also moved three times. From 1992 to 1995, the gallery was based in the Contemporary Art Center in Moscow Yakimanka st., from 1995 to 2007 it was situated in 7/7 Malaya Polyanka st., and from 2007 to 2012 it was set on the premises of Winzavod Contemporary Art Center. Despite the many changes, it was colloquially known as Guelman Gallery all the time

The history of Guelman Gallery more or less depicts the history of contemporary art in post-Soviet Russia. Over the years, the gallery had collaborations with almost every prominent artist of the respective period, from the classics of Moscow conceptualism (Yuri Albert, Igor Makarevich, Vadim Zakharov, Dmitri Prigov), Sots Art (Vitaly Komar & Alexander Melamid, Boris Orlov, Leonid Sokov) and postmodernism (Pavel Pepperstein, Georgy Ostretsov, Evgeny Semyonov) to St. Petersburg "New Academy" artists (Timur Novikov), to the legendary Mitki group, and Moscow actionism (Oleg Kulik, Anatoly Osmolovsky, Alexander Brener, Oleg Mavromati, Avdey Ter-Oganyan, RADEK group), to South Russian Wave (Alexander Sigutin, Arsen Savadov, Alexander Roitburd, Oleg Golosiy), to the pioneers of media art (Blue Soup group, AES+F, Olga Chernysheva, Vladislav Efimov & Aristarkh Chernyshev); and from painters (Yury Shabelnikov, Valery Koshlyakov, Alexander Vinogradov & Vladimir Dubosarsky, Dmitry Vrubel) to photographers (Boris Mikhailov, Vladislav Mamyshev-Monroe), architects (Alexander Brodsky, Alexey Belyaev-Gintovt), sculptors (Dmitry Gutov, Grisha Bruskin, Martynchik couple) and artists who work with installations and new media (Irina Nakhova, Vladimir Arkhipov, Blue Noses group and others).

Apart from Russian artists, Guelman exhibited Ukrainian art in his gallery, which was at the very roots of his work as a curator and a gallerist (South Russian Wave exhibition, 1992). A significant share of his collection has always been reserved for Ukrainian art. From 2002 to 2004, there was a local branch of Guelman Gallery in Kyiv, managed by Guelman's friend and one of the artists featured by the Moscow Gallery, Oleksandr Rojtburd.

Besides, in the early 1990s, Guelman was working hard to bring the post-Soviet art back to the international context. First, he established contacts with New York's leading galleries, which allowed the global art community to have an insight into the art of a large number of Guelman Gallery artists. At the time he also strived to exhibit the international stars in Russia. Amongst other things, during its Yakimanka st. period, Guelman Gallery hosted such landmark events as Andy Warhol’s and Joseph Beuys’s personal exhibitions (Alter Ego, 1994 and Leonardo's Diary, 1994, respectively).

Running major non-commercial exhibiting events in external spaces was another important activity of Guelman Gallery. The list of major events includes Conversion (Central House of Artists, 1993), Dedicated to the VII Congress of People's Deputies of Russia (Central House of Artists, 1993), New Money (State Tretyakov Gallery, 2006), Dynamic Couples (Moscow Manege, 2000), South Russian Wave and Nostalgia (State Russian Museum, 2000, which marked the 10th anniversary of Guelman Gallery), Russia 2 (Central House of Artists, 2005), St. Pete Folks: Contemporary Art of St. Petersburg (Central House of Artists, 2005), and a number of other events.

The Gallery participated in international exhibition-related events, festivals, and fairs from the very start of its work. In the early 2000s, it took part in some major international fairs such as FIAC (Paris) and ARCO (Madrid). In 1999 it created the project for the Russian Pavilion at Venice Biennale.

In April 2012, Marat Guelman as well as Elena Selina and Aidan Salahova, also among Russia's leading gallerists, announced that they would redesign the operation of their galleries. As a result, Guelman Gallery was closed down. Guelman stated that the main reason behind it was the shrinking of the contemporary art market in Russia due to the general political and economic instability.

The last event hosted by the legendary gallery was Alexey Kallima's exhibition Consider Yourself Lucky (May–June 2012).

== Cultural Alliance ==
In October 2012, Marat Guelman opened another exhibition space in Winzavod Contemporary Art Center, where the now shut down Guelman Gallery used to be. The Cultural Alliance production center specializes in exhibiting art from Russia's regions and the Commonwealth of Independent States in Moscow venues. It has hosted exhibitions representing the contemporary art of Kazakhstan, Izhevsk and Perm.

Turning his attention to regional art was not a mere accident for Guelman: from his very first exhibitions back in the 1990s he has engaged in searching for new artists and bringing them to Moscow. He is the person who "discovered", amongst other artists, the Novosibirsk-based Blue Noses group, as well as many artists from Saint Petersburg, Rostov-on-Don, and Ukraine.

The name of the gallery, as well as a significant part of its concept, comes from the Cultural Alliance association, founded by Guelman in 2010 in collaboration with the United Russia political party. It was designed as an association of Russian cities which have their own lively scene in the domain of contemporary culture. Within the time frame of two years the association ran two major festivals and about ten exhibitions, which have shown that even far away from Moscow "there are peculiar art communities, that provincial artists do not feel completely disconnected from the art scene of the capital and even from the international art scene, that they speak the language of contemporary art bridging the gaps of geography and biography".

In 2012, Guelman suspended his collaboration with the Russian regime. However, he did not cease his activities aimed at boosting the development of culture in the Russian regions. The Cultural Alliance Gallery at Winzavod Art Center came to be the result and the successor of such activities.

The 2011 Art Against Geography, held within the 4th Moscow Biennale of Contemporary Art, came to be another landmark event that shaped the concept of the gallery. It revealed a new situation in the Russian art, in which the Russian regions network and collaborate with the Russian art community in order to overcome the depression of the territory with their own efforts, skipping the regional Ministries of Culture, the state museums, and other official institutions.

The Cultural Alliance Gallery has become a prominent venue in Moscow, specialized in exhibiting the art of the Russian regions in the capital with the prospect of introducing it to the global art community, meaning that the gallery is dedicated to representing contemporary Russian art rather than contemporary Moscow art.

== Perm Museum of Contemporary Art ==
In 2008, Marat Guelman ran the exhibition Russian Povera in Perm. The exhibition, supported by Sergei Gordeev, the Representative of the Administration of Perm Region in the Federation Council of Russia, came to be a landmark project for Guelman in terms of his work as a curator. The exhibition included the works of the most prominent Russian artists of today, both of those renowned (Yuri Albert, Vladimir Arkhipov, Dmitry Gutov, Nikolay Polissky, Leonid Sokov, Igor Makarevich, Alexander Brodsky, Yury Shabelnikov, Sergei Shekhovtsov, and others) and young (Recycle, Anya Zholud, Zhanna Kadyrova, Ilya Trushevsky). It was held on the premises of Perm River Terminal, which was at the time out of work and rundown, restored to the minimum level required for the exhibition at Gordeev's expense.

45 thousand people came to see the exhibition within the scheduled one-month duration period, and it was extended for one more month at the request of the citizens. The case of the Russian Povera and its huge success paved the beginning of a large-scale project aimed at making Perm the "cultural capital" of Russia. The River Terminal, which had hosted Russian Povera, now restored and revamped, became the seat of Perm Museum of Contemporary Art (PERMM).

Marat Guelman became the head of the museum as its director. His activities at this post provoked criticism from certain Perm art workers as early as 2009. Alexey Ivanov, a renowned writer, who has a degree in the history of art, claimed that "the Museum fed on vast amounts of money, basically all of the local budget for culture", pointing out that as much as 90 million rubles had been provided for PERMM, while Perm Art Gallery had been provided with only 30 million rubles. Ivanov accused Moscow art workers of delivering overpriced projects and services. When Marat Guelman was awarded the Stroganoff Award, Ivanov renounced his own award, which he had won three years earlier, as a gesture of protest. In response, Marat Guelman accused Ivanov of making false statements pointing out that the museum was not financed from the budget.

Guelman curated the majority of the museum's exhibiting projects, including a number of projects that have had a major impact on shaping the Russian art community, such as Dmitry Vrubel’s Gospel Project (2009), A Night at the Museum (2010), Anonymous (2012), The Face of the Bride (2012), and Grand Caucasus (2012), co-curated by Nailya Allakhverdieva, Fatherland (2011), Icons (2012), etc. PERMM projects have been exhibited in other Russian cities as well as abroad. One of the museum's exhibitions, Vision, was shown in St. Petersburg in 2010 and in Tver in 2011, Russian Povera traveled to Milan in 2011, Fatherland was displayed in Novosibirsk and Krasnoyarsk in 2012.

The exhibitions held by PERMM produced an outcry of discontentment from the Russian Orthodox Church. Bishop Cyril of Stavropol confronted Guelman's exhibitions saying that Guelman's work had nothing to do with true culture and that it was aimed at driving inter-religious and interethnic hostility. In 2012 PERMM failed to run an exhibition in Novosibirsk as the Ministry of Culture of the region denied the project exhibition spaces.

The 2009 Living Perm Festival is another important achievement both for PERMM and for Marat Guelman. The museum was involved in creating and implementing the concept of the festival, supported by Oleg Chirkunov, ex-governor of Perm Krai. Living Perm came to be a key cultural event for the city, and a prototype of a larger festival, Perm White Nights, which has been held annually since. In 2012, it had over 1 million visitors. On 23 March 2009, PERMM became one of the state institutions of Perm Krai.

In June 2013, after a series of scandals Marat Guelman was dismissed from the post of the director of PERMM. The related legal commentary laid stress on the fact that the employer had no obligation to provide reasons for its decision. Guelman named censorship the main reason for his dismissal. The media believe that the cause leading to Guelman's dismissal from the post of PERMM's director was the personal exhibition of Vasily Slonov, a Krasnoyarsk-based artist, titled Welcome! Sochi 2014, which was opened within the program of Perm White Nights. The new governor of Perm Krai Viktor Basargin later said that it was the alliance with Guelman that had cost his predecessor Oleg Chirkunov his post.
