= Konstantin Syomin =

Russian journalist (born 1980)

- Константин Сёмин
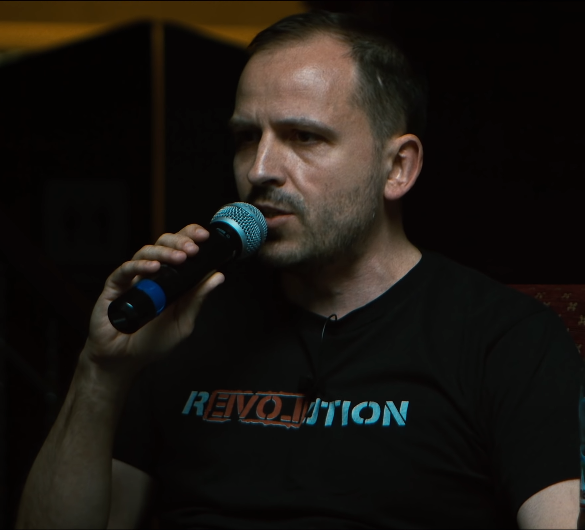
- Syomin in 2019
- Born: March 16, 1980 (age 46); Sverdlovsk, Russian SFSR, Soviet Union
- Education: Ural State University; New York University
- Occupations: Journalist, TV presenter, blogger, documentary filmmaker
- Spouse: Marina Romanyukha
- Awards: Medal of the Order "For Merit to the Fatherland"
- Website: agitblog.ru

Konstantin Viktorovich Syomin (often spelled Konstantin Semin, Russian: Константин Викторович Сёмин) is a Russian journalist, blogger and former TV presenter.

== Biography ==
=== Early life ===
Konstantin Syomin was born in 1980 in Sverdlovsk (modern Yekaterinburg). After graduating from the special school with in-depth study of English in 1996, he entered the Ural State University. While still a student, he began working on TV. During one of his trips to Chechnya as a reporter for Sverdlovsk Oblast TV channel (OTV), an accident occurred. Wanting to shoot a pit with poisonous gases, Konstantin lost consciousness. Lieutenant Yury Ilchenko of OMON died saving Konstantin's life.

=== Television host ===
From November 2000 Syomin was a correspondent for the Vesti program on RTR channel (currently Russia-1). In 2004–07 he was the chief foreign correspondent of VGTRK in the US basing in New York City. In 2007–10 Syomin became one of Vesti's hosts, and he also hosted night news program Vesti Plus.

In June 2007 he was awarded the Medal of the Order "For Merit to the Fatherland" 2nd class. In 2012 he graduated from the New York University. From April 2014 to March 2019, he was the author and host of AgitProp ("agitation and propaganda") program on Russia-24 channel, owned by VGTRK. On 1 April 2019, he announced the closure of AgitProp. The journalist complained about the management of "Russia-24", placing the episodes dedicated to the domestic policy issues early in the morning or late at night.

==== Zoran Đinđić controversy ====
On February 21, 2008, while commenting on the Serbian protests against Kosovo's declaration of independence in his Vesti Plus program, Syomin justified the 2003 assassination of Serbian Prime Minister Zoran Đinđić, opining that Đinđić was a Western puppet who received "a well-deserved bullet".

His comments provoked an outcry in Serbia. The next day, on February 22, the Serbian embassy in Moscow demanded an explanation from the TV company. The Serbian diplomats wondered whether the scandalous statement was the position of the state television or Syomin's personal viewpoint. However, they were unable to reach the company's management. On February 23, Serbian Foreign Minister Vuk Jeremić called his Russian counterpart Sergei Lavrov over the issue and sent a letter of protest to the All-Russia State Television and Radio Company. On February 25, the Liberal Democratic minority faction in the Serbian parliament accused Russia of gross interference in the domestic affairs of Serbia and proposed to recall the ambassador from Moscow unless Russia apologizes. President Boris Tadić promised to touch the issue on February 25, during the scheduled visit of First Deputy Prime Minister of Russia and presidential candidate Dmitry Medvedev to Belgrade behind closed doors. After the talks, Russian Foreign Minister Sergei Lavrov publicly dismissed Syomin's comments voiced on state-run television as nonsense and his personal opinion. However, despite the scandal, Syomin continued his work as a TV host, and the company has not commented on the issue.

== Political views ==
Syomin considers himself a Marxist and a communist, and said that "it took a very long time to come to this" and was initially a "staunch liberal".

In the fall of 2017, Syomin "took part" in the presidential primaries of the Left Front, but lost to Pavel Grudinin. Syomin himself says that he found out about this "participation" after the fact, he was added to the list without asking.
