= Magnitsky Human Rights Awards =

Annual human rights awards

The Magnitsky Human Rights Awards are international awards that recognise journalists, politicians, and activists in the field of human rights, named in honour of Sergei Magnitsky.

== History ==
The Magnitsky Human Rights Awards were established in 2015 by Bill Browder, named in honour of Sergei Magnitsky, a Russian lawyer who died in custody after uncovering a government corruption scheme. His death led to the creation of the Magnitsky Act, which sanctions human rights violators globally by freezing their assets and banning their visas.

== Description ==
The awards recognise journalists, politicians, and activists in the field of human rights. Notable past recipients include Boris Nemtsov, Senator John McCain, Jamal Khashoggi, Maria Ressa, and Oleg Sentsov.

The event occurs annually in London every November to commemorate Sergei Magnitsky's life and work. The Awards Dinner is attended by journalists, politicians, NGOs and civil society. The ceremony also allows the recipients of these awards a platform to highlight human rights issues to a broad audience.

== Past awardees ==
The Magnitsky Human Rights Awards has awarded numerous individuals, human rights activists, lawyers, journalists, etc. for their work in the field of human rights. Past recipients include:

=== 2015 ===
2015 awardees were:

- Outstanding European Coverage of the Magnitsky Case: Andrew Rettman
  - Presented by Marcus Kolga
- Outstanding British Coverage of the Magnitsky Case: James O'Brien
  - Presented by Chris Bryant
- Outstanding Campaigning European Politician: Guy Verhofstadt
  - Presented by Mikhail M. Kasyanov
- Outstanding Campaigning US Politician: Jim McGovern
  - Presented by Alan Mendoza
- Outstanding Human Rights Activism: Oslo Freedom Forum
  - Presented by Bjørn Engesland
- Outstanding Investigative Journalism: Organised Crime and Corruption Reporting Project (OCCRP)
  - Presented by Robert Barrington
- Outstanding Contribution to Human Rights Law: Geoffrey Robertson QC
  - Presented by Helena Kennedy QC
- Outstanding Contribution to the Global Magnitsky Campaign: Irwin Cotler
  - Presented by Sabine Leutheusser-Schnarrenberger
- Outstanding Campaigning for Democracy in Russia: Boris Nemtsov
  - Presented by Mikhail Khodorkovsky

=== 2017 ===
- Outstanding Contribution to Human Rights Law: Nikolai Gorokhov
  - Presented by Geoffrey Robertson QC
- Outstanding Russian Opposition Activist: Vladimir Kara-Murza
  - Presented by Mikhail Khodorkovsky
- Outstanding Campaigning Politician: Dominic Raab
  - Presented by Helena Kennedy QC
- Outstanding Human Rights Activist: Valery Borshchyov
  - Presented by Thor Halvorssen
- Outstanding Contribution to the Global Magnitsky Campaign: Marcus Kolga
  - Presented by James Bezan
- Outstanding Investigative Journalist: Khadija Ismayilova
  - Presented by Bjørn Engesland

=== 2018 ===
2018 awardees were:

- Outstanding Contribution to Human Rights Law: John McCain
  - Presented by Vladimir Kara-Murza
- Outstanding Russian Opposition Activist: Alexei Navalny
  - Presented by Thor Halvorssen
- Outstanding Lawyers: Rolando Alvarado; Victoria Sandoval
  - Presented by Sir William Browder KCMG
- Outstanding Human Rights Activist: Oleg Sentsov
  - Presented by Emanuelis Zingeris
- Outstanding Investigative Journalist (Russia): Zoya Svetova
  - Presented by Kyle Parker
- Outstanding Investigative Journalist (International): Eliot Higgins
  - Presented by Marcus Kolga

=== 2019 ===
2019 awardees were:

- Outstanding Investigative Journalist: Maria Ressa
  - Presented by Amal Clooney
- Outstanding Russian Opposition Activist: Lyubov Sobol
  - Presented by Vladimir Kara-Murza
- Outstanding Lawyers: James A. Goldston; Rupert Skilbeck
  - Presented by Mark Ellis
- Outstanding Human Rights Activist: Gulchehra Hoja
  - Presented by Sir William Browder KCMG
- Outstanding Human Rights Activist: Oleg Sentsov
  - Presented by Meghan McCain
- Outstanding Campaigning Politician: Ana Gomes
  - Presented by Kyle Parker
- Courage Under Fire: Jamal Khashoggi
  - Presented by Agnès Callamard

=== 2020 ===
- Outstanding Contribution to the Global Magnitsky Campaign: Pieter Omtzigt; Sjoerd Sjoerdsma
  - Presented by Sir William Browder KCMG
- Courage Under Fire: Belarus Free Theatre
  - Presented by Stephen Fry
- Outstanding Justice Campaign: Andrew, Matthew and Paul Caruana Galizia
  - Presented by Maria Ressa
- Outstanding Russian Opposition Activist: Sergei Mokhnatkin
  - Presented by Vladimir Kara-Murza
- Outstanding Opposition Figure: Nathan Law
  - Presented by Chris Patten
- Outstanding Human Rights Activist: Loujain al-Hathloul
  - Presented by Agnès Callamard

=== 2021 ===
- Outstanding Contribution, Global Magnitsky Justice Movement: Kimberley Kitching
  - Presented by Sir William Browder KCMG
- Courage Under Fire: Nazanin Zaghari-Ratcliffe
  - Presented by Monique Villa
- Outstanding Lawyer: Tutu Alicante
  - Presented by Rupert Skillbeck
- Outstanding Investigative Journalist: Catherine Belton
  - Presented by Anne Applebaum
- Outstanding Human Rights Activist: Peter Dahlin
  - Presented by Nusrat Ghani
- Outstanding Opposition Figure: Maria Kalesnikava
  - Presented by Vladimir Kara-Murza

=== 2022 ===
- Outstanding Contribution, Global Magnitsky Justice Movement: Jan Lipavsky
  - Presented by Kyle Parker
- Outstanding Human Rights Activist: Enes Kanter Freedom
  - Presented by Sir William Browder KCMG
- Courage Under Fire: Yuliia Paievska
  - Presented by Kira Rudik
- Outstanding Investigative Journalist: Lucy Kassa
  - Presented by Catherine Belton
- Outstanding Opposition Figure: Alexei Gorinov
  - Presented by Evgenia Kara-Murza
- Outstanding Young Human Rights Activist: Thinzar Shunlei Yi
  - Presented by Nazanin Zaghari-Ratcliffe
- Outstanding Lawyer: Fatou Bensouda
  - Presented by Mark Ellis

=== 2023 ===
- Outstanding Young Human Rights Advocate: Anaïse Kanimba; Carine Kanimba
  - Presented by Roger Carstens
- Courage Under Fire Award: Evgenia Kara-Murza
  - Presented by Meghan McCain
- Outstanding Human Rights Activist Award: Mykola Kuleba
  - Presented by Kira Rudik
- Outstanding Human Rights Lawyer Award: Thulani Maseko
  - Presented by Thor Halvorssen
- Outstanding Opposition Politician Award: Felix Maradiaga
  - Presented by Bianca Jagger
- Lifetime Achievement Award: Baroness Helena Kennedy
  - Presented by Sir William Browder KCMG
- Outstanding Journalist Award: Jimmy Lai
  - Presented by Sir Iain Duncan Smith

=== 2024 ===
- Lifetime Achievement Award: Senator Ben Cardin
  - Presented by Sir William Browder KCMG
- Courage Under Fire Award: Yulia Navalnaya
  - Presented by Vladimir Kara-Murza
- Outstanding Human Rights Lawyer: Brandon Silver
  - Presented by Kyle Parker
- Outstanding Journalist: Zahra Joya
  - Presented by Tina Brown CBE
- Outstanding Young Human Rights Activist: Zhala Bayramova
  - Presented by Anaïse Kanimba; Carine Kanimba
- Outstanding Opposition Politician: María Corina Machado
  - Presented by Thor Halvorssen

=== 2026 ===
- Ye Lin Myint, a.k.a. Ko Ye has been awarded one of the prizes; the ceremony is on 12 November in London.

== High profile cases ==
The Magnitsky Human Rights Awards have been linked to several high-profile cases, underscoring their significance in the field of global human rights advocacy.

=== Vladimir Kara-Murza ===
A prominent Russian opposition figure and recipient of the Outstanding Russian Opposition Activist in 2017, Vladimir Kara-Murza has been a critic of Vladimir Putin and the Russian government. Kara-Murza worked alongside Sir William Browder KCMG to advocate for the adoption of Magnitsky Acts worldwide, but his activism led to two poisonings by the Russian government and a 25-year sentence in a Russian prison for speaking out against Russia's war in Ukraine. In a prisoner swap, the largest since the Cold War, Kara-Murza was freed on August 1, 2024.

=== Jimmy Lai ===
A Hong Kong media tycoon and pro-democracy activist, Jimmy Lai was recognised with the Outstanding Journalist Award. He has been imprisoned for his commitment to press freedom and democracy in Hong Kong, particularly through his work with the Apple Daily newspaper.

=== Alexei Navalny ===
A Russian opposition leader and activist known for anti-corruption efforts, Alexei Navalny was a recipient of the Outstanding Russian Opposition Activist award. Known for his investigations into corruption at high levels of the Russian government, Navalny's poisoning and imprisonment drew international. On February 16, 2024, Navalny died in Russian prison, while serving a 19-year sentence.

=== Jamal Khashoggi ===
The Saudi journalist and critic of the Saudi government Jamal Khashoggi was posthumously recognised by the Magnitsky Awards for the Courage Under Fire award in 2019. Khashoggi's murder in the Saudi consulate in Istanbul in 2018 drew international.

=== Alexei Gorinov ===
Alexei Gorinov is a Russian opposition politician and lawyer who served as a Moscow municipal deputy. Gorinov was the first person to be sentenced under Russia's law against distributing 'false' information about the Russian army for speaking out against Russia's war in Ukraine. In April 2022, he was sentenced to seven years in prison for his opposition to the war in Ukraine.

=== Félix Maradiaga ===
Félix Maradiaga is a Nicaraguan human rights and pro-democracy activist, recognized as one of his country's leading pro-democracy voices. He is the founder of Fundación Para la Libertad and has faced persecution by the Ortega government, including imprisonment and expulsion to the United States. In 2023, he was awarded the Magnitsky Human Rights Award for Outstanding Political Opposition.

== Associated news ==
The Magnitsky Human Rights Awards have been associated with several high-profile cases and news stories, reflecting their role in highlighting global human rights issues.

Human rights lawyer Thulani Maseko, a pro-democracy activist from Eswatini, was posthumously awarded the Outstanding Human Rights Lawyer Award in 2023. He was killed in January 2023, and his wife, Tanele Maseko, accepted the award on his behalf. During her acceptance, she accused Eswatini's King Mswati of involvement in her husband's death, a claim denied by the Eswatini government.

In response to her acceptance speech, Eswatini Government spokesperson Alpheous Nxumalo released a statement on behalf of the Eswatini Government, denying Maseko's claims at the Magnitsky Human Rights Awards:

"The Government would like to categorically state that these utterances are a fabrication of the truth and are part of a narrative that seeks to promote hatred against the King and further perpetrate civil discord, something which should not be tolerated at any platform since it erodes the very existence of fundamental rights which Thulani stood for."
