= European Student Think Tank =

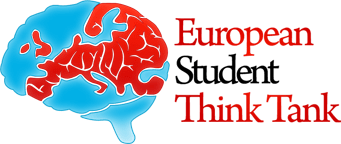
European Student Think Tank (EST)

The European Student Think Tank (abbreviated EST) is an international non-government organisation established in 2010 dedicated to involving young Europeans in the European policy-making process. It functions as an online journal of international affairs and annually publishes an academic journal, "The European Policy Review".

== History ==
The European Student Think Tank won the 2011 European Charlemagne Youth Prize, awarded by the European Parliament, and has since then expanded to host a network of ambassadors in Council of Europe member states.

== Activities ==
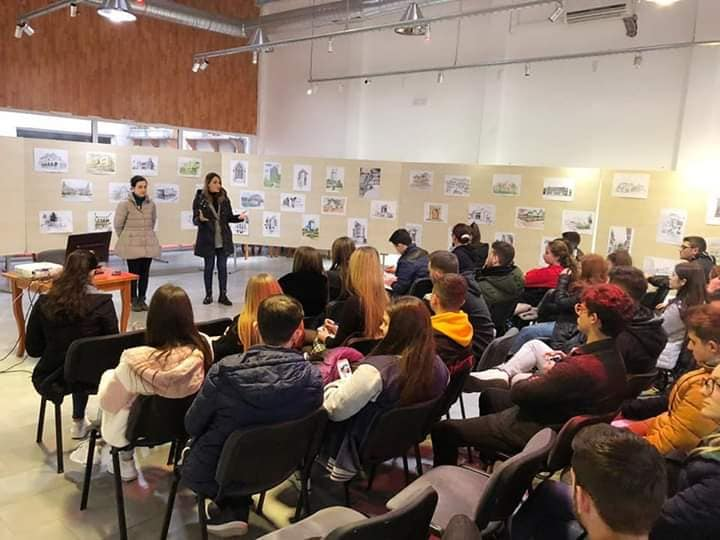
On the International Day of Education, EST Ambassadors discussed the EU's role in educating young people on topics such as sustainability, diversity and peace.

The European Student Think Tank currently hosts debates across EU institutions in which young people engage with policy-makers, such as debates in the European Parliament on gender equality and youth participation in European Politics in 2016. Members of the European Parliament and representatives of the European Commission as well as academics participated. European Student Think Tank President Carlota Nunez Strutt was a panelist in the Progressive Alliance of Socialists and Democrats Europe Together conference, together with European Parliament President Martin Schulz and vice-president of the European Commission Federica Mogherini. At the European Youth Event 2021, EST hosted a crash course on the European Green Deal.

=== The European Policy Review ===
The European Policy Review is the peer-reviewed journal for and by students, published by the European Student Think Tank. It contains papers on a wide range of topics related to EU policy and European affairs. The European Policy Review has four editions to date.
