= Evgenia Kara-Murza =

Russian human rights activist

- Евгения Кара-Мурза
- Kara-Murza in 2023
- Born: 1981 (age 44–45); Sakhalin Oblast, Russian SSR, Soviet Union
- Citizenship: Russia; United States
- Education: Moscow State Linguistic University
- Occupations: Translator; Activist
- Organization: Free Russia Foundation
- Known for: Campaigning for the release of her husband
- Spouse: Vladimir Kara-Murza
- Children: 3

Evgenia Kara-Murza (Russian: Евгения Кара-Мурза; born c. 1981) is a Russian-American human rights activist. A translator by profession, she became known as an activist for the rights of political prisoners in her native Russia after her husband, Vladimir, was arrested in 2022.

== Early life and education ==
Kara-Murza was born in the Kuril Islands in Sakhalin Oblast in what was then the Soviet Union. Her father worked as a coast guard, and as a result Kara-Murza and her family moved throughout her childhood, including periods living in Sevastopol, Saint Petersburg and Tallinn. By the time Kara-Murza was 11, the family had settled in Moscow, the capital of the newly independent Russia.

Kara-Murza first met Vladimir Kara-Murza, who would later become her husband, when they were children living in Moscow, though Kara-Murza subsequently moved to the United Kingdom, causing them to lose touch. After completing her education, Kara-Murza studied at the Moscow State Linguistic University, with a focus on the French language. She later reconciled with Vladimir Kara-Murza after he returned to Moscow, and the couple subsequently married.

== Activism ==
Prior to her husband's arrest and her subsequent focus on activism, Kara-Murza had worked as a translator and interpreter, being fluent in Russian, French and English. During this time, she worked for various non-governmental organisations, including the International Centre on Nonviolent Conflict, the Institute of Modern Russia and PEN America.

While her husband became known as an opposition activist in Russia, including running as a candidate for the State Duma in the 2003 Russian legislative election, Kara-Murza preferred to keep a low profile. She supported her husband during the campaign, which was ultimately unsuccessful, and later moved with him to the United States so he could take up a position as Washington, D.C. bureau chief for the Russian independent media outlet RTVI. The family settled in Virginia, where they went on to have three children. Kara-Murza supported her husband through two poisoning attempts in 2015 and 2017, which caused him to develop polyneuropathy.

=== Arrest and imprisonment of Vladimir Kara-Murza (2022–2024) ===
Kara-Murza gained greater attention in her own right following the arrest of her husband in April 2022. He was detained in Russia shortly after giving a speech at the Arizona House of Representatives in which he criticised the recent Russian invasion of Ukraine. In October 2022, Kara-Murza was charged with treason, and in April 2023, he was sentenced to 25 years in prison. Following his arrest, Kara-Murza began publicly campaigning for his release, including meeting with politicians and parliamentarians in various countries, including the United Kingdom, the United States, Germany, Belgium, Austria, France, the Czech Republic and Canada. In addition to her husband, Kara-Murza called for the release of other detainees, including Alexei Navalny, Nikita Uvarov and Aleksandra Skochilenko. She also gave interviews in which she provided accounts of her husband's experiences in the Russian penal system.

Kara-Murza has called on governments to take action against Vladimir Putin, the president of Russia, including carrying out greater sanctions and formally recognising his rule as being a terrorist regime. She has criticised countries' inaction in addressing Putin as granting him impunity for abusing human rights in Russia, particularly following the death of imprisoned opposition activist Alexei Navalny in 2024.

In October 2023, Kara-Murza testified before the United States' Commission on Security and Cooperation in Europe about her husband's incarceration. She gained the support of 81 Senators and Representatives, who called on Antony Blinken, the Secretary of State, to publicly declare her husband as being "unlawfully or wrongfully detained". On 1 March 2024, Kara-Murza met with David Cameron, the Foreign Secretary of the United Kingdom; she had previously criticised the delay in action being taken by the British government, giving her husband's British citizenship, which she attributed to "chaos" in the Foreign Office which saw multiple foreign secretaries in the period following her husband's arrest. Kara-Murza had also criticised the British government for refusing to accept or negotaite a prisoner exchange for her husband, calling on the government to establish a dedicated office to deal with arbitrarily detained people, akin to the United States' Special Presidential Envoy for Hostage Affairs. Following her meeting with Cameron, the British government publicly called for Kara-Murza to be released on medical grounds.

During her husband's imprisonment, Kara-Murza typed up handwritten articles he sent her, which she shared with editors for publication in The Washington Post. She also became the executive director of the Free Russia Foundation and the chair of the 30th October Foundation, supporting Russian political prisoners and their families.

On 1 August 2024, Kara-Murza was released from prison as part of a prisoner exchange deal. She learned he had been released while at the Oval Office with the president of the United States, Joe Biden.

Kara-Murza is married to Russian-British opposition leader and journalist Vladimir Kara-Murza, who was sentenced to serve 25 years at Omsk IK-6 prison in Siberia for treason. She and Kara-Murza have three children. They have lived in Washington, D.C. since the mid-2000s when her husband was posted there to work as bureau chief for RTVI. They currently live in Virginia.

== Recognition ==
Kara-Murza has named Natalya Gorbanevskaya as one of her heroes. She has been compared to Yulia Navalnaya and Sviatlana Tsikhanouskaya, the wives of activists Alexei Navalny and Sergei Tikhanovsky, respectively, who became known as activists in their own rights following their husbands' imprisonments.

In 2023, Kara-Murza received the Magnitsky Human Rights Award for Courage Under Fire from Meghan McCain. In 2024, Kara-Murza won Index on Censorship's Freedom of Expression Trustee Award, in recognition of her campaigning for freedom for her husband and other Russian opposition figures, at great personal risk. That same year, she received the Democracy Service Medal from the National Endowment for Democracy for her advocacy for political prisoners. In 2026, she received the Women's Democracy Network's Jeane J. Kirkpatrick Award in recognition of her being "a powerful voice for freedom and justice in Russia", being the previous year's laureate.

In 2026, Kara-Murza featured in the documentary An Unknown Substance, which followed her campaign for her husband's release. The film premiered in the United Kingdom on BBC Four as part of its Storyville series.
