= Vladimir Kara-Murza =

Russian opposition politician (born 1981)

- Владимир Кара-Мурза
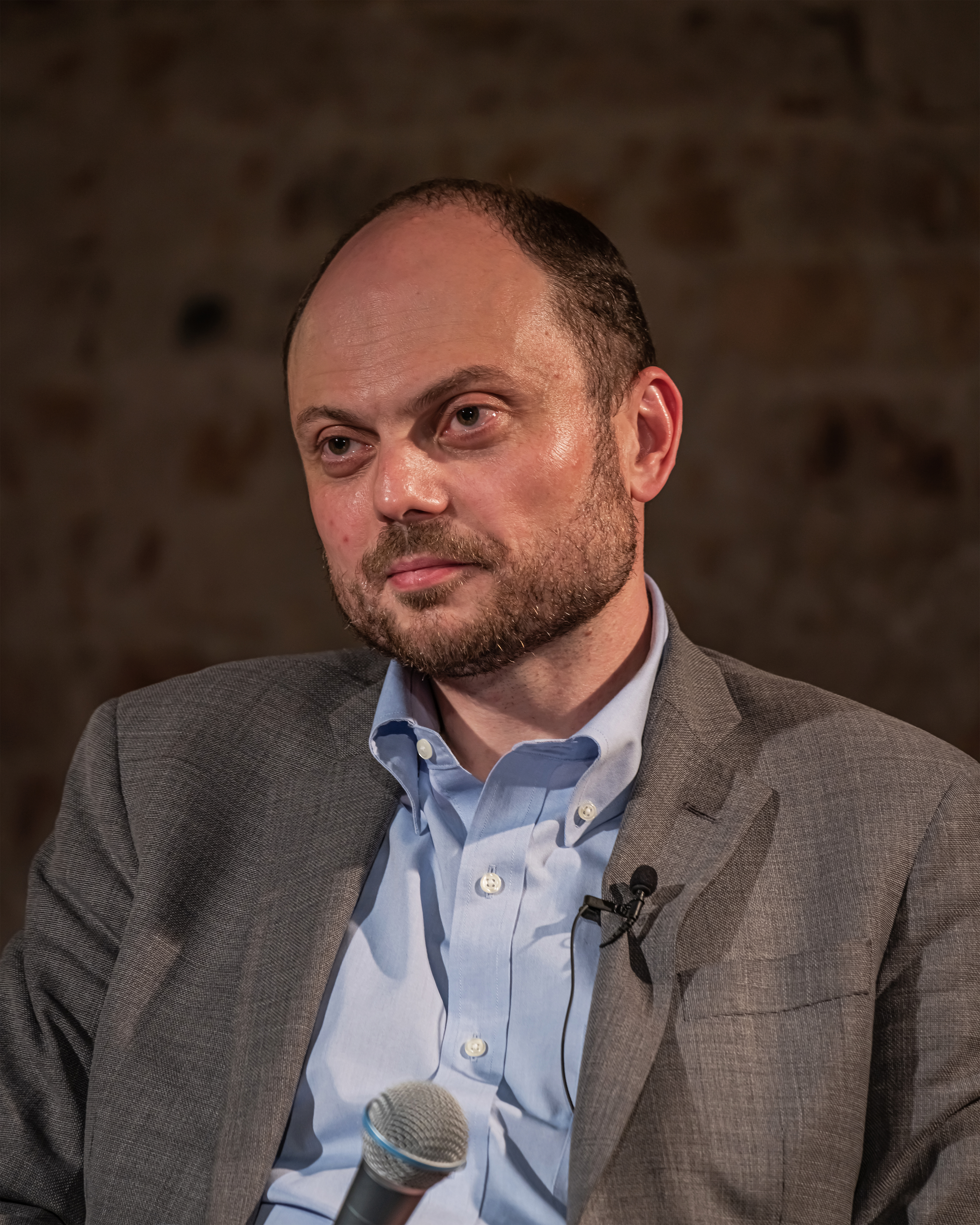
- Kara-Murza in 2024

Vice-Chairman of Open Russia
- Incumbent
- Assumed office 12 November 2016

Deputy Leader of the People's Freedom Party
- In office 5 July 2015 – 17 December 2016
- Leader: Mikhail Kasyanov

Personal details
- Born: 7 September 1981 (age 45) Moscow, Russian SFSR, Soviet Union
- Citizenship: Russia; United Kingdom
- Party: Union of Right Forces (2001–2008); People's Freedom Party (2012–2016)
- Spouse: Evgenia Kara-Murza
- Children: 3
- Parent: Vladimir Kara-Murza Sr. (father)
- Education: Trinity Hall, Cambridge (BA)
- Awards: Václav Havel Human Rights Prize (2022); Pulitzer Prize (2024)

Vladimir Vladimirovich Kara-Murza (Russian: Владимир Владимирович Кара-Мурза, IPA: [kɐˌra mʊrˈza]; born 7 September 1981) is a Russian-British political activist, journalist, author, filmmaker, and former political prisoner. A protégé of murdered Russian dissident Boris Nemtsov, Kara-Murza is vice-chairman of Open Russia, an NGO founded by the exiled Russian businessman and former oligarch Mikhail Khodorkovsky, which promotes civil society and democracy in Russia. He was elected to the Coordinating Council of the Russian Opposition in 2012, and served as deputy leader of the People's Freedom Party from 2015 to 2016. He has directed two documentaries, They Chose Freedom and Nemtsov. As of 2021, he serves as Senior Fellow to the Raoul Wallenberg Centre for Human Rights. He was awarded the Civil Courage Prize in 2018.

In April 2022, after speaking out against the Russian invasion of Ukraine, Kara-Murza was arrested on charges of disobeying police orders. His arrest was extended after prosecutors introduced new charges of "discrediting" the military, and in October 2022 he was charged with treason. Amnesty International and others called the charges politically motivated due to his anti-war views. In October 2022, he was awarded the Václav Havel Human Rights Prize.

In April 2023, Kara-Murza was sentenced to 25 years in prison, and was sent to a prison colony in Siberia. In 2024, he was awarded the Pulitzer Prize for commentary for the columns which he continued to write from his prison cell for The Washington Post. On 1 August 2024, Kara-Murza was released from prison as part of a prisoner exchange deal involving two dozen individuals from seven different countries.

== Early life and education ==
Vladimir Vladimirovich Kara-Murza was born in Moscow, the son of Russian journalist and television host Vladimir Alexeyevich Kara-Murza (1959–2019), an outspoken critic of Leonid Brezhnev and supporter of reforms under Boris Yeltsin. His mother is Jewish. His father was a great grandson of Latvian revolutionary Voldemārs Bisenieks (1884–1938), and great-grand-nephew of Latvia's first Ambassador to Great Britain, Georgs Bisenieks (1885–1941), both of whom were shot by the NKVD. The Latvian agronomist and publisher Jānis Bisenieks (1864–1923) was their older brother.

He is related to Sergey Kara-Murza (born 1939), a Soviet/Russian historian, chemist, and philosopher. He is a member of the Kara-Murza family, who are descendants of a Tatar aristocrat who settled in Moscow and converted to Christianity in the 15th century AD.

Kara-Murza earned a BA and an MA degree in history at Trinity Hall, Cambridge, and he speaks fluent English and French. With his wife Evgenia, he has three children.

== Career ==
=== Author and journalist ===
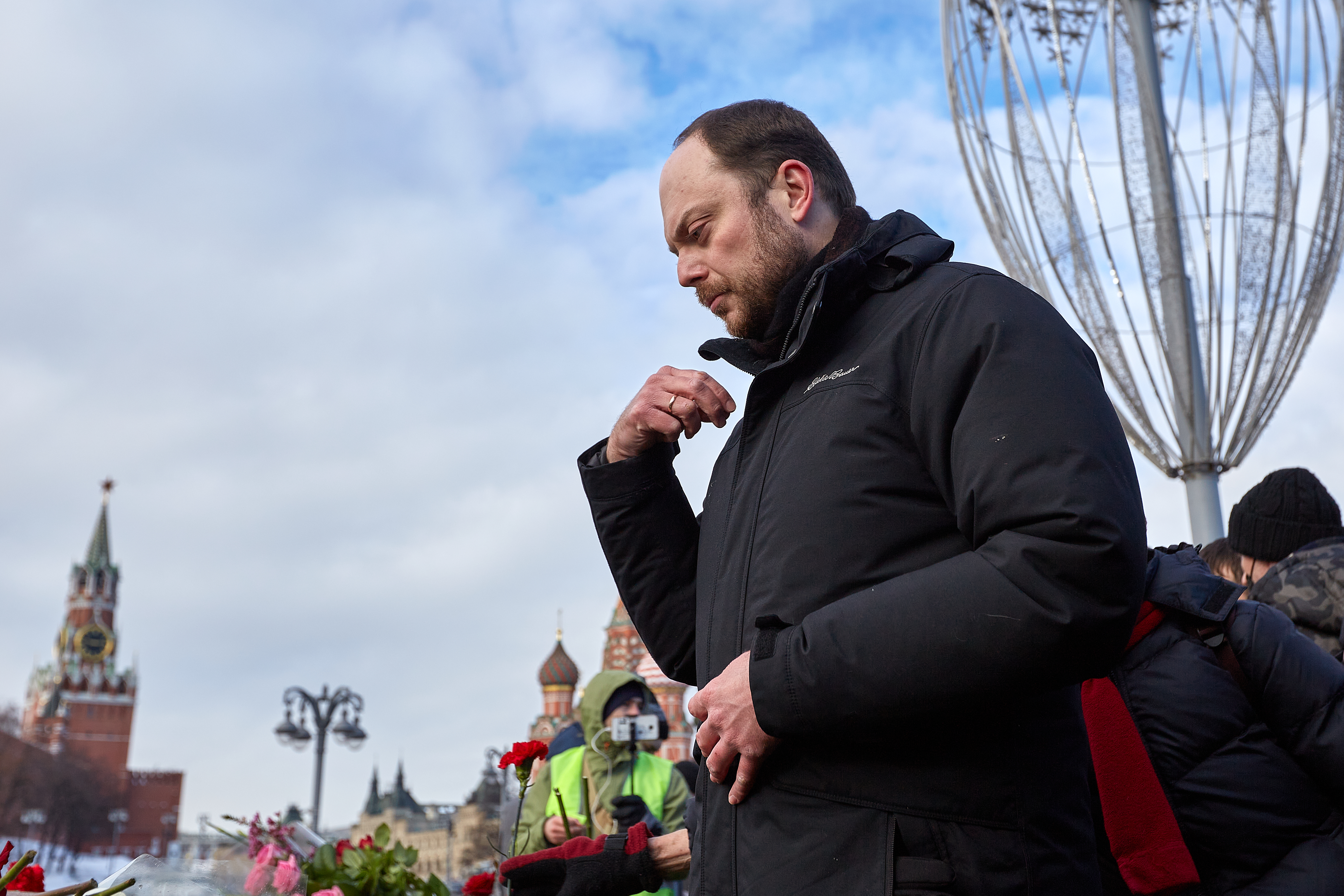
Kara-Murza makes the sign of the cross at the place of assassination of Boris Nemtsov in Moscow on 27 February 2021.

Kara-Murza became a journalist at the age of 16. He worked as London correspondent for a succession of Russian media outlets, including Novye Izvestia from 1997 to 2000, Kommersant from September 2000 to June 2003, and the radio station Ekho Moskvy from September 2001 to June 2003. Kara-Murza then briefly became foreign affairs correspondent of Kommersant (July 2003 to April 2004) and Washington correspondent for the BBC (December 2004 to December 2005). In 2002, he was editor-in-chief of the London-based financial publication Russian Investment Review. In April 2004 he took over as the Washington bureau chief of the RTVi television network, a post he held for the next nine years. On 1 September 2012 he was dismissed from this job.

=== Documentarian ===
In 2005, Kara-Murza produced a four-part TV documentary, They Chose Freedom, dedicated to the history of the Soviet dissident movement. The documentary was based on interviews with Russian dissidents, including Vladimir Bukovsky, Elena Bonner and Sergei Kovalev. It was first aired in October 2005.

The documentary has since been screened at various locations in Europe and North America, with subtitles added in English. On 24 March 2014, Kara-Murza, Anne Applebaum, and Vladimir Bukovsky took part in a discussion following a London screening of the film.

=== Author ===
In 2011, Kara-Murza published his first book, Reform or Revolution: The Quest for Responsible Government in the First Russian State Duma (in Russian only), which recounts the unsuccessful attempt by the Cadets or Constitutional Democratic Party to form a government during the brief existence of the first Russian Parliament or Duma from April to July 1906. Based on the original 1906 parliamentary record and contemporary newspaper reports, as well as memoirs by participants of the events, the book was launched in both Moscow and Saint Petersburg.

In late 2014 and early 2015, he wrote about a number of anti-democratic trends in Russia. President Vladimir Putin, for example, had resumed the Soviet practice of stripping dissidents of their Russian citizenship. As a result of this and other acts, Kara-Murza urged the Council of Europe not to restore Russia's voting rights, suspended since the annexation of Crimea. Kremlin SWAT teams, he wrote in December 2014, were breaking up opposition meetings. Putin's word was therefore "void of value", wrote Kara-Murza, citing as evidence the false statements made by the Russian President and his broken promises.

Putin soft-pedaled his response to the opposition during the Sochi Olympics, Kara-Murza wrote in an op-ed for The Wall Street Journal, published on 26 February 2014. Now that the international event was over, the Russian president was rapidly returning to his former oppressive behaviour. Only hours after the closing ceremony in Sochi, a Moscow court handed prison sentences to seven of the May 2012 Bolotnaya Square protestors.

Pressure was brought to bear not only within Russia. Russia's nationwide TV had been broadcasting "hate-filled appeals to crush the protesters in Kiev" for several weeks early in 2014, noted Kara-Murza. For Putin, he explained, "maintaining the status quo in Ukraine was not primarily about preserving a post-Soviet sphere of influence or recreating a Moscow-led empire". The Russian president feared that "a democratic, pro-European Ukraine" would set "a 'dangerous' precedent for Russia" and that it would be "only a matter of time" before Russian citizens began to demand similar levels of political and economic freedom.

=== Russian politics ===
From 1999 to 2001, Kara-Murza was a member of the Democratic Choice of Russia party; from 2001 to 2008 he was a member of the Union of Right Forces. Between 2000 and 2003 he served as an advisor to State Duma opposition leader Boris Nemtsov. He has been in opposition to Vladimir Putin since 2000, backing liberal candidate Grigory Yavlinsky in the 2000 presidential election.

Kara-Murza was a candidate for election to the Russian parliament, or State Duma, in the 2003 parliamentary election, running in Moscow's Chertanovsky district. His candidacy was endorsed jointly by the Union of Right Forces and Yabloko. During the campaign, various underhanded methods were used against Kara-Murza. The candidate from the United Russia ruling party Vladimir Gruzdev attempted to have him removed from the ballot; the lighting on Kara-Murza's campaign billboards and the sound during his televised debates were turned off; and unlawful carousel voting was discovered on election day. British journalist Andrew Jack named the Chertanovsky district in south Moscow as a case of electoral manipulation in Russia's 2003 vote in his book Inside Putin's Russia. According to the official results, Gruzdev received 149,069 votes (53.8%); Kara-Murza, 23,800 votes (8.6%); and Communist Party candidate Sergei Seregin, 18,992 votes (6.9%).

In January 2004, he co-founded the Committee 2008, an umbrella opposition group led by Boris Nemtsov and Garry Kasparov. In May 2007, Kara-Murza nominated the veteran human rights activist and writer Vladimir Bukovsky as a democratic opposition candidate for the Russian presidency in the 2008 election. "The opposition needs a candidate for president – strong, uncompromising, decisive, with irreproachable political and, more importantly, moral authority," read the statement written by Kara-Murza on behalf of Bukovsky's campaign committee. "Russia needs its own Vaclav Havel, not a new successor from [the KGB]."

From May to December 2007, Kara-Murza chaired Bukovsky's campaign committee, which included, among others, Academician Yuri Ryzhov, writer and satirist Victor Shenderovich, columnist Andrei Piontkovsky, lawyer Yuri Schmidt, human rights activist Alexander Podrabinek, and political analyst Vladimir Pribylovsky. In October 2007, Kara-Murza was one of organisers of the "Rally of Free People" held on Moscow's Triumfalnaya Square in support of Bukovsky's presidential nomination.

On 16 December 2007, Bukovsky was duly nominated as a presidential candidate by 823 members of a voters' assembly in Moscow (the law required at least 500 people to support such a nomination). At the same meeting, Kara-Murza was elected as Bukovsky's plenipotentiary representative to Russia's Central Electoral Commission. On 22 December 2007 the Commission refused to register Bukovsky as a candidate for the presidency, thereby denying Bukovsky access to the ballot.

At the founding convention of Solidarnost, Russia's united democratic movement, in December 2008, Kara-Murza was elected to the movement's federal council, placing second out of 77 candidates, behind Nemtsov. He was re-elected to the Solidarnost council in 2010 and 2013.

In 2012, he took part in the street protests in Moscow against Putin's rule, the largest pro-democracy demonstrations in Russia since 1991.

In June 2012, Kara-Murza was elected to the federal council of the Republican Party of Russia – People's Freedom Party, co-chaired by Boris Nemtsov, Mikhail Kasyanov, and Vladimir Ryzhkov. In October 2012, he was elected to the Coordinating Council of the Russian Opposition, placing 21st out of 169 candidates and receiving 20,845 votes.

=== Institute of Modern Russia ===
Soon after, on 1 November 2012, Kara-Murza was hired by the Institute of Modern Russia as the organisation's senior policy advisor. "It is an honor for me to join this distinguished institute and contribute to its mission of keeping the spotlight on the situation in Russia and advocating for democracy, human rights, and the rule of law", said Kara-Murza, "These values should remain at the forefront of international relations." In February 2013, he took part in panel discussions about Russia's future at The Heritage Foundation. In October 2013, with Pavel Khodorkovsky, son of the former entrepreneur and philanthropist Mikhail Khodorkovsky and others, he participated in a similar discussion hosted by the National Endowment for Democracy.

=== Open Russia ===
Kara-Murza is a coordinator of the Open Russia Foundation, founded by Mikhail Khodorkovsky. The organisation was created with the goal of promoting civil society and democracy in Russia, while revoking Putin's grip on power. Launched in 2014, Open Russia has been instrumental in educating Russian citizens on western democracy, whilst bringing opposition groups and activists in contact with support from the west. Kara-Murza is deputy chairman and heads Open elections project designed to promote free and fair elections in Russia; a task he has noted is exceedingly difficult given the government's ability to silence opposition and manipulate elections. He also frequently addresses international stages to promote further cooperation and discussion among nations.

=== Funeral pallbearer for John McCain ===
In April 2018, United States Senator John McCain sent Kara-Murza a message revealing that McCain had been diagnosed with brain cancer and requesting that Kara-Murza, who had worked with McCain on issues relating to Russia since 2010, serve as a pallbearer at the senator's eventual funeral. Kara-Murza later said that he was "speechless", "heartbroken", and "close to tears", and that doing so would be "the most heartbreaking honor that anyone could think of". McCain died on 25 August; Kara-Murza joined fourteen others chosen by McCain himself, including then-former Vice President Joe Biden and actor Warren Beatty, as a pallbearer at McCain's funeral at the Washington National Cathedral on 1 September. McCain's choice of Kara-Murza was described by Politico as a "final dig" at Putin, of whom McCain was a vocal critic, and at U.S. President Donald Trump, for his apparent closeness to the Russian president.

== Magnitsky Act ==
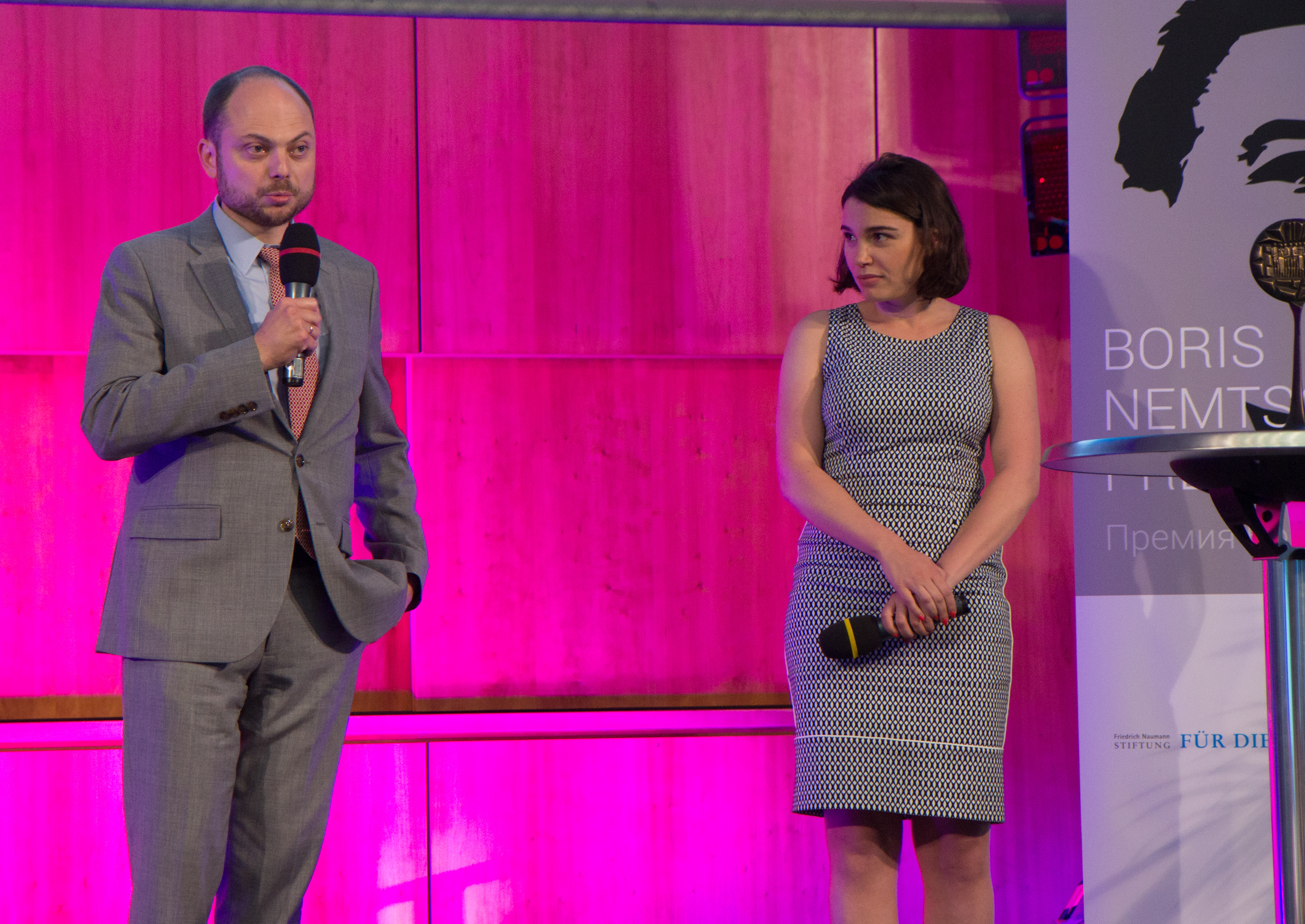
Kara-Murza and Boris Nemtsov's daughter Zhanna Nemtsova on 20 June 2018

As a journalist who was fluent in English and based partly in the U.S., Kara-Murza played a role in the events that led to the 2012 passage of the Magnitsky Act by the U.S. Congress.

In July 2012, Kara-Murza reported that he had been denied access a few days earlier to the Russian Embassy in Washington, D.C. This decision was taken on the orders of the ambassador himself on the grounds that Kara-Murza was "no longer a journalist". On 1 September 2012, Kara-Murza dismissal as Washington bureau chief of RTVi was made public. According to several sources, he was now on a "blacklist" and could not be employed as a journalist by any Russian media outlets. The reason for this ban was his advocacy of the Sergei Magnitsky Rule of Law Accountability Act, then being considered by the U.S. Congress.

The draft law was named after Sergei Magnitsky, a Moscow tax advisor who uncovered a massive tax-fraud scheme involving several law-enforcement officials and who died in custody of those same officials in 2009 after being tortured and denied medical care. Its purpose was to prevent the issuing of U.S. visas to persons "responsible for the detention, abuse, or death of Sergei Magnitsky", (and for "extrajudicial killings, torture, or other gross violations of internationally recognized human rights" in Russia) and to freeze access to any U.S.-based assets those persons might hold. The law also extended to cover Russian officials involved in broader acts of corruption and in violations of basic civil liberties. Kara-Murza explained his support for the law by saying that "The prospect of losing access to the West and its financial systems...may well be, for now, the only serious disincentive to corruption and human rights violations by Russian officials."

Writing in The National Interest, Mark Adomanis warned that the Magnitsky law came with a cost. It had "potential downsides," and was worsening "Russia's already precarious human-rights situation", driving "some of the ever-dwindling number of effective opposition journalists" from the country. In particular he cited the firing of Kara-Murza, although the journalist's employers described his dismissal as part of "a long-planned reorganization". Opposition leader Boris Nemtsov, reported Adomanis, "suggested the decision to fire Kara-Murza may have come from an extremely high-ranking official: Alexei Gromov, the deputy head of the presidential administration." An article in July by Peter Baker of The New York Times was devoted largely to the arguments of the law's critics. He did quote Kara-Murza's comment that the bill would hit corrupt officials and human-rights violators "where it hurts, closing access to their ill-gotten gains in the West."

On 25 July 2012, Kara-Murza testified before the Tom Lantos Human Rights Commission of the U.S. Congress about human-rights abuses in Russia and described the proposed Magnitsky Law as "a pro-Russian bill which provides a much-needed measure of accountability for those who continue to violate the rights and freedoms of Russian citizens." He added: "The Kremlin's reaction to this legislation shows that it hits them precisely where it hurts. I want to take this opportunity to thank Co-Chairmen McGovern and Wolf for their leadership on this issue. I hope the Magnitsky Act is signed into law before the end of this year." In a December 2012 article co-written with Nemtsov, Kara-Murza reiterated his support for the Magnitsky Act which he and Nemtsov called "a pro-Russian law that strikes at the heart of the Kremlin's mafia-like system", adding that "Russian opposition and civil society leaders and cultural figures, as well as a plurality of Russian citizens, are in favour of the Magnitsky law."

On 12 December 2012, the Magnitsky Act became United States law.

Kara-Murza and Nemtsov called on Canada to pass a similar piece of legislation, then under consideration by the International Human Rights Subcommittee of the Canadian parliament's House of Commons. Writing for Maclean's in December 2012, Michael Petrou reported Kara-Murza's visit to Ottawa to urge the passage of the proposed Canadian version of the Magnitsky law, a private member's bill introduced by Liberal MP Irwin Cotler: while it was the task of Russian opposition leaders, not foreigners, "to bring democratic change to Russia," Kara-Murza said, Western democracies could still help the cause of Russian democracy through legislation. Those in Russia who had abused and tormented Magnitsky "rule in the style of Zimbabwe or Belarus," wrote Petrou, paraphrasing Kara-Murza, "but prefer the West as a safe place to store their money, buy second homes, and send their children to school. And it is in the West where they are most vulnerable."

In June 2013, in an interview with France 24 television, Kara-Murza discussed the proposed version of the Magnitsky law then being debated in the European Parliament. He spoke in favour of such laws, and noted that the list of persons covered by the U.S. law was being expanded. He distinguished between those in the European Parliament who were "friends of Russia" and those who were "friends of Putin".

In March 2014, noting that the average Russian opposes intervention in Ukraine by the government of Vladimir Putin, Kara-Murza stated that the world "should respond to Putin's aggression" by imposing sanctions against its perpetrators. He called for the list of Russian human-rights abusers who were already banned, under the Sergei Magnitsky Act, from travelling to the United States and keeping assets there to "be dramatically expanded to include senior Kremlin officials responsible for the attack on Ukraine and the crackdown against Russian citizens." He also expressed the hope that "the European Union would soon follow with its own version of the Magnitsky sanctions." "Those who commit acts of aggression and abuse the rights of their own citizens should not be entitled to the privileges and comfort of the democratic West," he said.

=== List of state-employed journalists ===
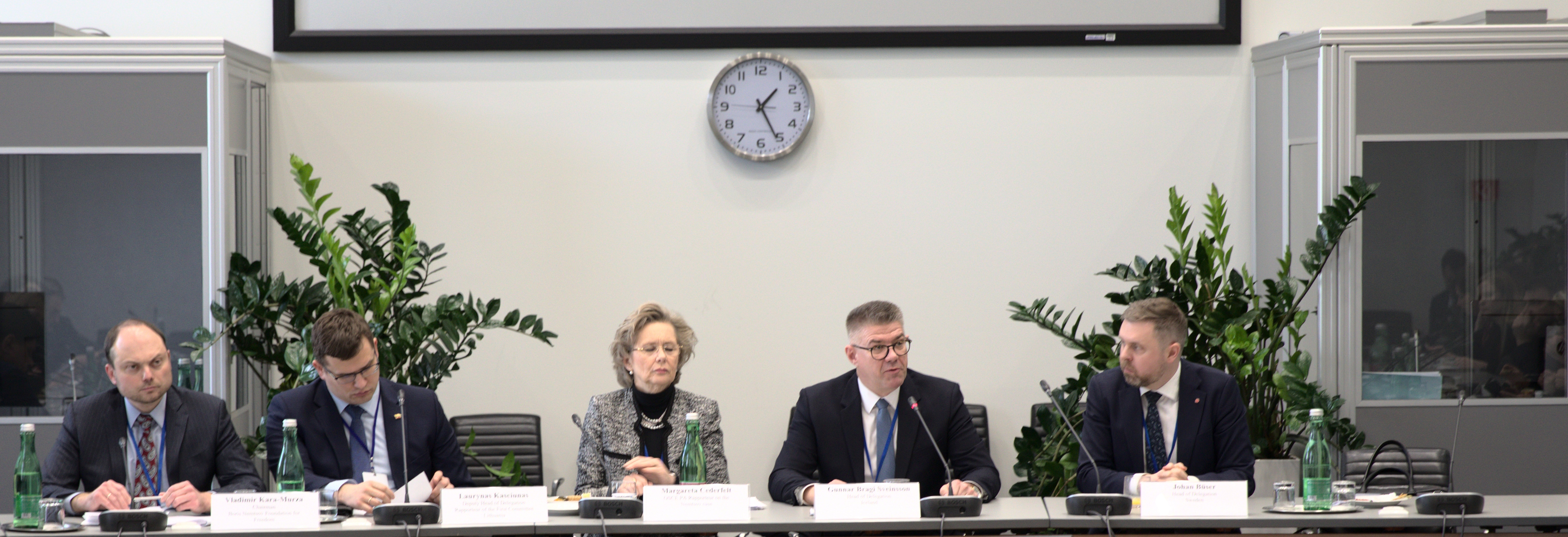
Presentation of the Parliamentary Assembly of the Organization for Security and Co-operation in Europe report in the Hofburg in 2020

On 27 February 2015, opposition leader Boris Nemtsov was assassinated by four shots from behind while he was sitting on a bridge near Red Square in Moscow. According to Bill Browder, Kara-Murza is a protégé of Nemtsov.

In late April 2015, Kara-Murza and Mikhail Kasyanov presented a list of eight names to members of the House of Representatives and the Senate of the US Congress. These were the TV presenters and other state-employed journalists and commentators who, Kara-Murza and Kasyanov alleged, had created an atmosphere of "hatred, intolerance and violence" around the figure of Nemtsov in the months leading up to his murder one hundred yards from the Kremlin. Specifically, the named individuals had stated on nationwide television that Nemtsov was a traitor, an enemy of Russia, part of a "fifth column" within the country, and that he would have welcomed the invading German forces outside Moscow in 1941.

Kara-Murza explained the appeal to U.S. legislators by saying that Russia's law-enforcement agencies, unfortunately, had declined to investigate these recorded and documented statements although incitement to harm an individual was also a crime according to the Criminal Code of the Russian Federation. These eight names, Kara-Murza hoped, would now be added to those already on the Magnitsky List. The eight names were listed in the Kommersant daily newspaper.

On 18 May 2015, the daily newspaper Komsomolskaya Pravda reported that Yevgeny Alexeyevich Fyodorov, a State Duma deputy for United Russia, had requested the Investigative Committee of the Russian Federation to assess whether Kasyanov and Kara-Murza had not committed an act of treason, under Article 275 of the RF Criminal Code, by submitting the above list of eight names to members of the US Congress. When approached by the newspaper the Investigative Committee would not pass comment on deputy Fyodorov's statement.

== Poisonings ==
=== 2015 ===
On 26 May 2015, Kara-Murza was suddenly taken ill in Moscow during a meeting. He had eaten lunch at a restaurant and then had a two-hour meeting, during which he consumed nothing and felt normal, before becoming ill over a ten to fifteen minute period, leading to vomiting. At first he was thought to be having heart difficulties, but treatment at a specialised cardiac clinic did nothing to arrest the symptoms. Kara-Murza was then taken to hospital in Moscow. Initial symptoms indicated that he could have been poisoned, according to doctors, and he was later diagnosed with kidney failure.

Coming after the murder of his colleague Boris Nemtsov on 27 February 2015, and mindful of other cases of poisoning, both in Russia (journalist and Duma deputy Yuri Shchekochikhin in 2003, the attempted murder of Anna Politkovskaya in 2004) and abroad (Alexander Litvinenko in October 2006) there was great concern on the part of friends and family. His wife Evgenia urged that he be evacuated from Russia for examination and treatment abroad. On 2 June, it was announced by a spokesman for the Republican Party of Russia – People's Freedom Party that Kara-Murza had emerged from his coma and recognised his wife, who was now by his bedside. The cause of his sudden illness remained a mystery, but in an interview with the BBC his father commented, "if someone did want to frighten us, then they succeeded." There has never been any conclusive evidence that Kara-Murza has ever been intentionally poisoned.

After his release from the hospital, Kara-Murza stated that it was difficult to "believe this was an accident", suspecting it was an intentional poisoning, but noted there was no way to be certain. On 15 August 2015, Mikhail Khodorkovsky commented with delight that Kara-Murza had returned to work co-ordinating the Open Elections project. Kara-Murza is working to provide free and fair elections for the Duma.

=== 2017 ===
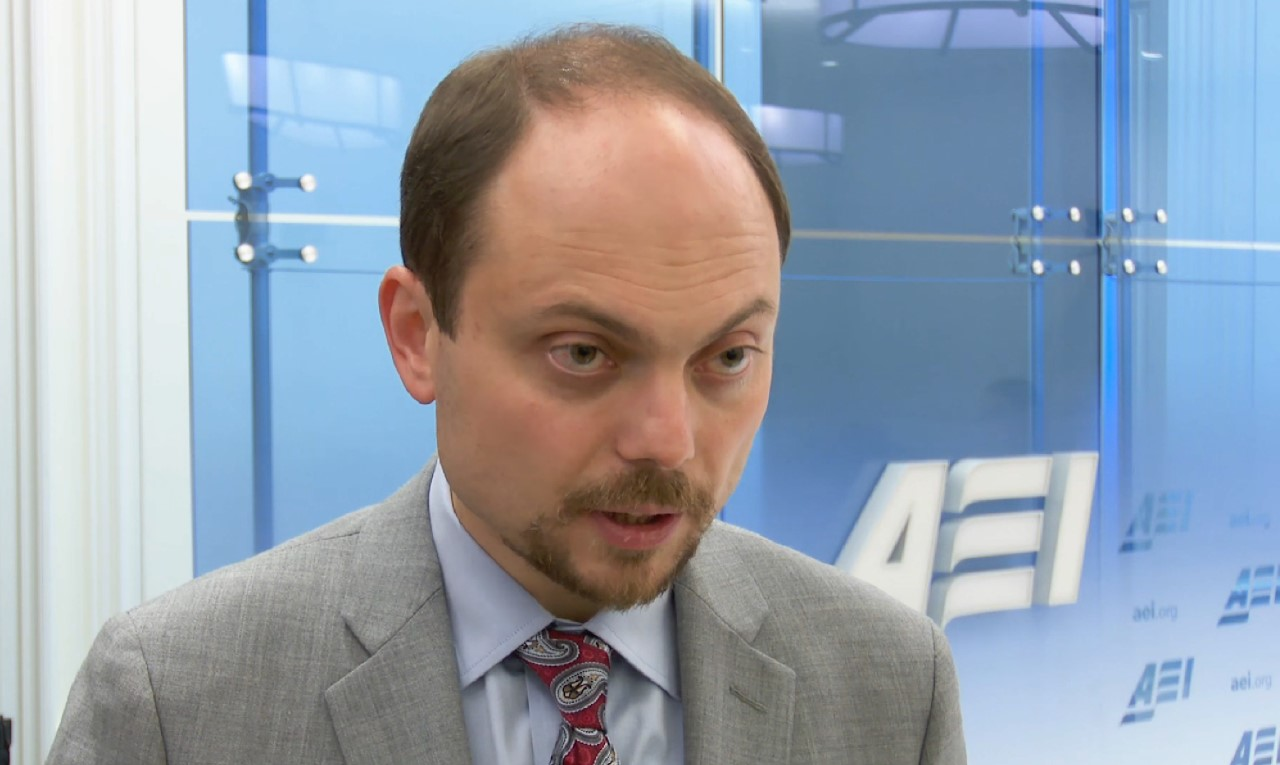
Kara-Murza in 2018

On 2 February 2017, Kara-Murza was again hospitalised after the onset of the same symptoms as his prior illness. He was put in a medically-induced coma and was on life support. He was treated at the same hospital by the same medical team who had already saved his life in 2015. According to his lawyer Vadim Prokhorov, Kara-Murza was diagnosed by the hospital with 'toxic influence of an unknown substance'. He was released on 19 February and went abroad for rehabilitation. His lawyer sent the Russian Investigative Committee a request to open a criminal case into the alleged poisoning. A similar request after the 2015 incident had been turned down without an explanation. His blood samples were provided to a number of laboratories including one affiliated to the FBI. But for unclear reasons, the FBI subsequently have not revealed details of their investigations into the substance that triggered Kara-Murza's illness, with one US Senator suggesting that it might be "classified". Two other labs—in France and Israel—have also conducted tests, but they were inconclusive.

In February 2021, a Bellingcat joint investigation with The Insider and Der Spiegel said that Kara-Murza had been followed by the same FSB unit that allegedly poisoned Alexei Navalny before he fell ill in 2015 and 2017.

== Anti-war activism and imprisonment ==
On Monday 11 April 2022, during the Russian invasion of Ukraine, Kara-Murza was arrested outside his house in Russia on charges of disobeying police orders, and faced up to 15 days in jail or a small fine. It was not immediately clear if Kara-Murza’s arrest was linked to his opposition to Russia’s actions in Ukraine. The arrest came hours after he had referred to the Putin government as "a regime of murderers".

On 22 April 2022, Kara-Murza was charged by a Russian court for allegedly spreading false information about the Russian military. The criminal case against Kara-Murza was a result of his March 15 speech to the Arizona House of Representatives, in which he denounced the Russian invasion of Ukraine.

In July, new charges of cooperating with an "undesirable" foreign NGO were introduced, for which he faced up to six years in prison. In October, Vadim Prokhorov, one of his lawyers, said that Kara-Murza had also been charged with treason, which could lead to 20 years in prison.

In October 2022, Kara-Murza was awarded the Václav Havel Human Rights Prize by the Parliamentary Assembly of the Council of Europe.

In April 2023, one of Kara-Murza's lawyers said that Russian prosecutors had asked for a 25-year prison sentence, the maximum possible. Additionally, the prosecution also asked for the sentence to be served in a "strict regime" prison colony where conditions are harsh, and where prisoners are held in locked cells rather than barracks. On 17 April 2023, he was convicted on charges of treason and "spreading disinformation" about the Russian military, and sentenced to 25 years in prison. The sentence of 25 years was a combination of sentences under three articles of the Russian Criminal Code – seven years in the case of "military fakes", three years in the case of participation in the activities of an "undesirable" organization, and 18 years in the case of treason. The sentence was the longest given to an opposition figure since the start of the war in Ukraine. By comparison, the maximum term for murder and rape in Russia is 15 years. Kara-Murza's conviction is the longest sentence for political activity since the fall of the Soviet Union, and the length of the sentence is comparable only to Stalin's purges in the 1930s.

Kara-Murza compared his case to show trials from the Stalin era. In his closing speech before the court, he said: "I know that the day will come when the darkness over our country will be gone. When the war [in Ukraine] will be called a war, and the usurper [in the Kremlin] will be called a usurper; when those who have ignited this war will be called criminals instead of those who tried to stop it... And then our people will open their eyes and shudder at the sight of the horrific crimes committed in their names." Following his conviction, Kara-Murza was transferred from Moscow to IK-6, a maximum security prison in Siberia, and was immediately placed in a "punishment cell".

On 29 January 2024, it was reported that Kara-Murza had disappeared after prison authorities informed his lawyers that he was no longer held at IK-6. British foreign secretary David Cameron demanded that Russia account for Kara-Murza's whereabouts. It later emerged that Kara-Murza had been transferred to solitary confinement at a harsher facility, IK-7, for supposed breaches of prison rules. In a letter disclosed to the media, Kara-Murza suggested that his transfer was because he had become "too comfortable" at IK-6.

=== Release through prisoner exchange ===
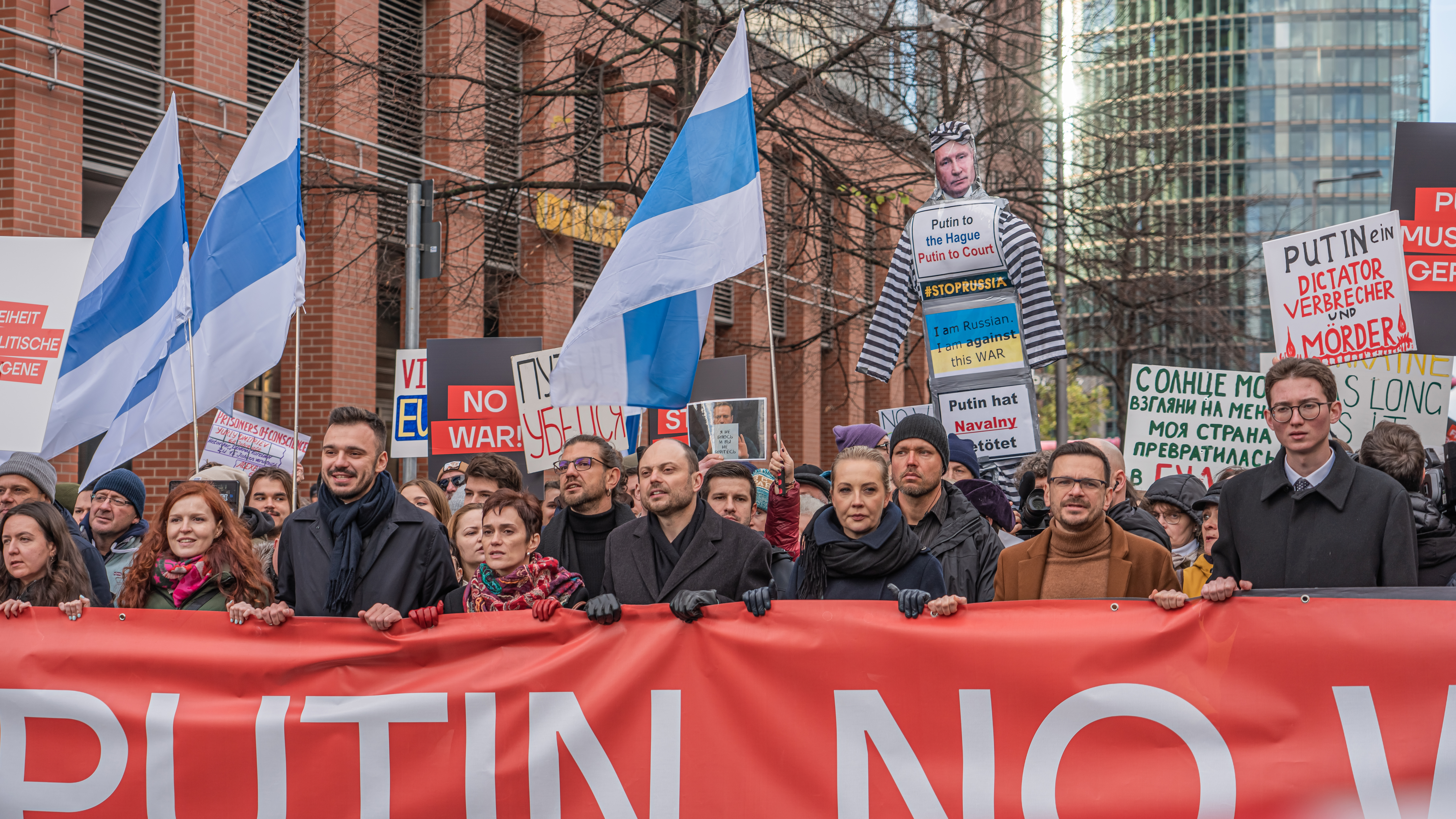
Vladimir Kara-Murza, Yulia Navalnaya, Ilya Yashin and Ruslan Shaveddinov at an anti-war protest in Berlin, 17 November 2024

On 1 August 2024, Kara-Murza was one of sixteen prisoners held in Russia who were pardoned and released as part of the 2024 Russian prisoner exchange. Kara-Murza and the others were flown to Ankara Esenboğa Airport in Turkey, where they were exchanged for eight Russians who had been imprisoned in several Western countries. David Lammy, who had replaced Cameron as UK foreign secretary, welcomed the releases of Kara-Murza and Paul Whelan, stating that Kara-Murza had been "imprisoned in life-threatening conditions because he courageously told the truth about the war in Ukraine".

== Political activity and activism in exile (2024-present) ==
In 2024, shortly after his release, Kara-Murza continued his anti-war activism, signing an open letter urging Mongolia to detain Putin during a state visit in accordance with an ICC arrest warrant.

In 2026, Kara-Murza was selected to be a participant in the PACE Platform for Dialogue with Russian Democratic Forces. The platform met in Strasbourg for its first session in January 2026. In an opinion piece for the Washington Post, he stated his priorities for the platform include political prisoners, sanctions, and a "post-Putin transition".

== Writings ==
=== Books ===
- Реформы или революция: к истории попытки образовать ответственное министерство в I Государственной Думе [Reform or revolution: the quest for responsible government in the First Russian State Duma] (PDF) (in Russian). Moscow: Yabloko. 2011. ISBN 978-5-85691-074-1.

=== Articles ===
- "Russians want democracy: it is a myth spread by Putin that they don't". The Wall Street Journal. 15 September 2009.
- "Putin's desperate crackdown: no cordons can stop Russians' growing awareness that their everyday problems cannot be addressed by an authoritarian system". The Wall Street Journal. 5 August 2010.
- "Первое вашингтонское предупреждение: "Закон Магнитского" единогласно утвержден комитетом Конгресса США" [The first Washington warning: "Magnitsky Act" was unanimously approved by the US Congress Committee]. Novaya Gazeta (in Russian). No. 64. 13 June 2012.
- "Russia's rigged election: the Putin regime disqualifies its popular, pro-democracy competition". The Wall Street Journal. 28 June 2011.
- "Magnitsky act supporters feel the Kremlin's wrath". The Washington Post. 26 July 2012.
- Kara-Murza, Vladimir V. (September–October 2012). "Russia's local elections: politics in spite of Putin". World Affairs. 175 (3): 53–60. JSTOR 41639019.
- "What are they thinking? A study of youth in three post-Soviet states". World Affairs. 175 (4): 88–93. November–December 2012. Archived from the original on 7 November 2012.
- Kara-Murza, Vladimir Vladimirovich (2013). "Ending impunity for crooks and abusers" (PDF). In Servettaz, Elena (ed.). Why Europe needs a Magnitsky law: should the EU follow the US?. Elena Servettaz. pp. 63–70. ISBN 978-2954629803. Archived (PDF) from the original on 2 April 2016.
- Kara-Murza, Vladimir V. (July–August 2013). "Kremlin crooks: Putin's 'patriotic' hypocrites". World Affairs. 176 (2): 56–63. JSTOR 43554781.
- "The end of Russia's Olympic truce on dissent: Ukraine's uprising fans Putin's fears of losing control over Russia". The Wall Street Journal. 26 February 2014.
- "Politics in Russia: the Kremlin's troubles". World Affairs. 176 (5): 47–54. January–February 2014.
- "Ukraine is Putin's, not Russia's, war". The Washington Post. 4 March 2014.
- "Russia and the Baltics: once friend, now foe". World Affairs. 177 (5): 16–24. January–February 2015. Archived from the original on 23 January 2015.
- "Boris Nemtsov, 1959–2015". Delfi. 3 March 2015.
- "A small measure of justice for Boris Nemtsov". The Washington Post. 26 August 2015.
- "Testimony: Vladimir V. Kara-Murza". Russian violations of the rule of law: how should the U.S. respond?: three case studies: hearing before the Commission on Security and Cooperation in Europe, one hundred fourteenth congress, first session, October 20, 2015. United States. Congress. Commission on Security and Cooperation in Europe. 2015. Archived from the original on 17 April 2016.
- "Boris Nemtsov: from Kremlin heir to dissident". Demokratizatsiya: The Journal of Post-Soviet Democratization. 24 (1): 31–34. Winter 2016.
- Russian authorities just arrested an entire conference hall full of people. I was one of them. // The Washington Post, 18 March 2021
