= Daria Navalnaya =

Russian political activist (born 2001)

Daria Alexeyevna Navalnaya
- Дарья Алексеевна Навальная
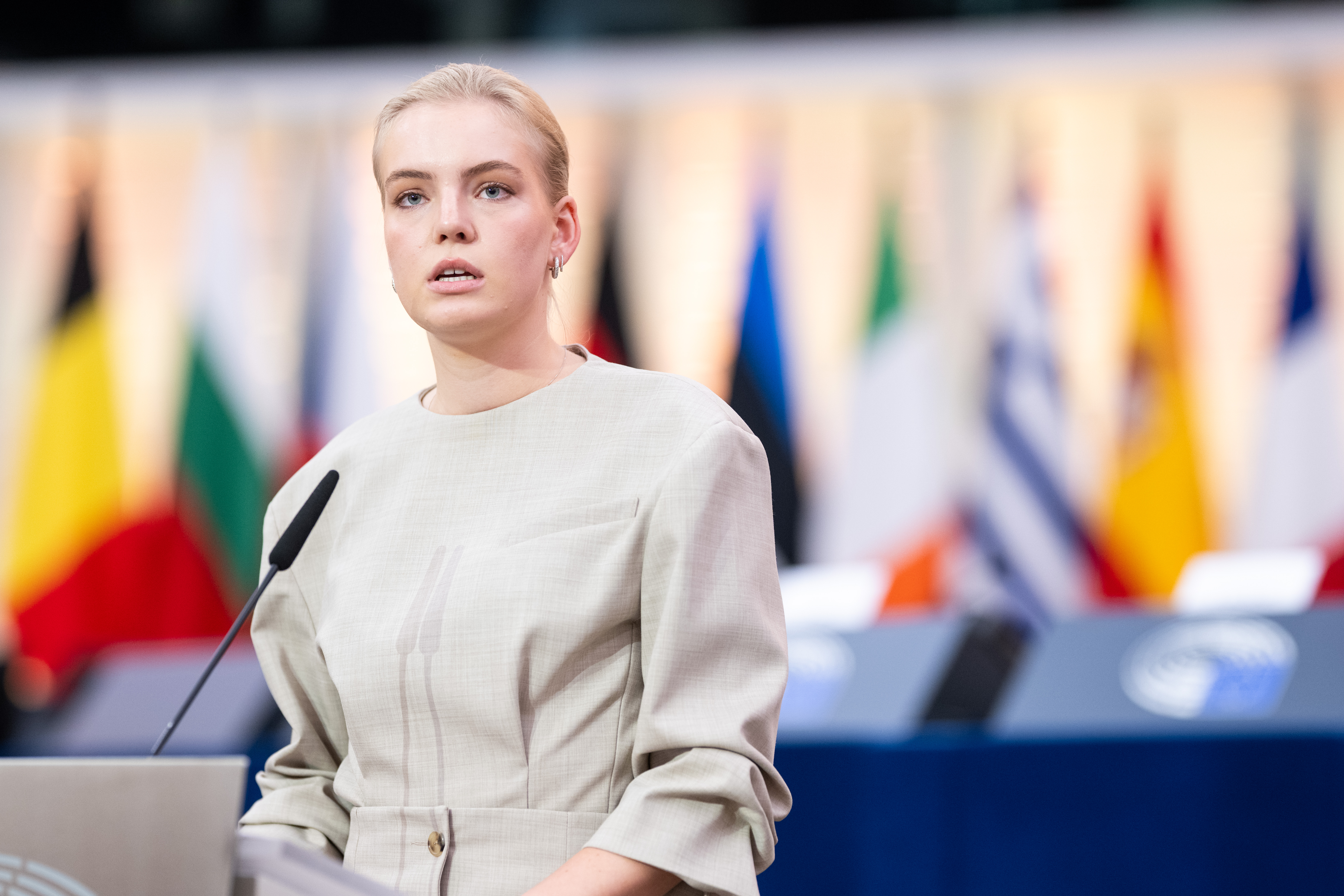
- Daria Navalnaya speaking at the European Youth Event (EYE 2025)
- Born: 2001 (age 24–25); Moscow, Russia
- Other name: Dasha Navalnaya
- Education: Stanford University
- Occupations: Political activist; public speaker
- Years active: 2021–present
- Parents: Alexei Navalny (father); Yulia Navalnaya (mother)
- Relatives: Zakhar Navalny (brother)

Daria Alexeyevna Navalnaya (Russian: Дарья Алексеевна Навальная; born 2001) is a Russian political activist. The elder child of Russian opposition leader Alexei Navalny and Yulia Navalnaya, she became a public advocate for her father after his imprisonment in 2021, accepting the European Parliament's Sakharov Prize for Freedom of Thought on his behalf in December of that year and later speaking at the TEDWomen conference about his work and the political situation in Russia.

Following her father's death in a Russian penal colony in February 2024, Navalnaya continued to take part in public events related to the Russian opposition, accepting a posthumous award from the McCain Institute on his behalf and, in August 2024, joining the U.S. presidential campaign of Vice President Kamala Harris as a field organiser in Philadelphia. She has written opinion pieces about her father and Russian politics for The New York Times and Time.

== Early life and education ==
Daria Navalnaya was born in 2001 and grew up in Moscow. Her father, Alexei Navalny, was the most prominent domestic critic of Russian president Vladimir Putin. Her mother is Yulia Navalnaya. She has a younger brother, Zakhar. Navalnaya has described her childhood as shaped by state surveillance of her family, recalling that she and her brother would play a game on the Moscow Metro of identifying and evading the officers shadowing them.

Navalnaya enrolled at Stanford University in California in 2019, where she majored in psychology with a pathway in society, culture and mind, and minored in political science. She completed her undergraduate degree in June 2024, four months after her father's death.

== Public activism ==
=== Advocacy during her father's imprisonment ===
Alexei Navalny was arrested on his return to Russia in January 2021, having recovered in Germany from a 2020 poisoning with a Novichok-type nerve agent that Western governments and independent investigators attributed to the Russian state. In April 2021, while her father was on a hunger strike to protest his prison conditions and his personal doctor had warned that he was close to death, Navalnaya called publicly on the authorities to allow him medical attention.

In June 2021, Navalnaya accepted the Geneva Summit for Human Rights and Democracy's Moral Courage Award on her father's behalf by video link, telling delegates that he had asked her to dedicate the prize to political prisoners in Russia and Belarus.

In October 2021, the European Parliament named Alexei Navalny as the recipient of its Sakharov Prize for Freedom of Thought. With her father imprisoned, Navalnaya accepted the prize at the award ceremony in Strasbourg on 15 December 2021, delivering a speech he had drafted from prison in which he urged the European Union to remain committed to its founding democratic values.

=== Media appearances and writings ===
Navalnaya gave an interview about her father's prison conditions to Fareed Zakaria on CNN's Fareed Zakaria GPS in January 2023. She was the main guest of a CNN primetime special anchored by Erin Burnett in March 2023, in which she discussed her family's experience of state surveillance in Russia and called for the release of political prisoners and an end to the war in Ukraine. She also spoke to CNN's Jim Acosta from the White House Correspondents' Dinner in April 2023, saying that her father's health was deteriorating and that prison staff were depriving him of food.

In October 2023, Navalnaya delivered a talk at the TEDWomen conference in Atlanta, titled "Lessons from My Father, Alexey Navalny", in which she described her father's poisoning and imprisonment and her own experience of growing up under government surveillance.

Navalnaya has contributed opinion pieces on her father and Russian politics to The New York Times and Time. In 2019, The New York Times' opinion section published a video op-ed by her and journalist Adam Westbrook titled "What It's Like To Be a Teenager in Putin's Russia", in which Navalnaya and other young Russians described their political views. In December 2022, Time published her essay "Why Putin Fears My Father Alexei Navalny", in which she wrote about her father's treatment in Russian custody and his political work.

=== Death of Alexei Navalny ===
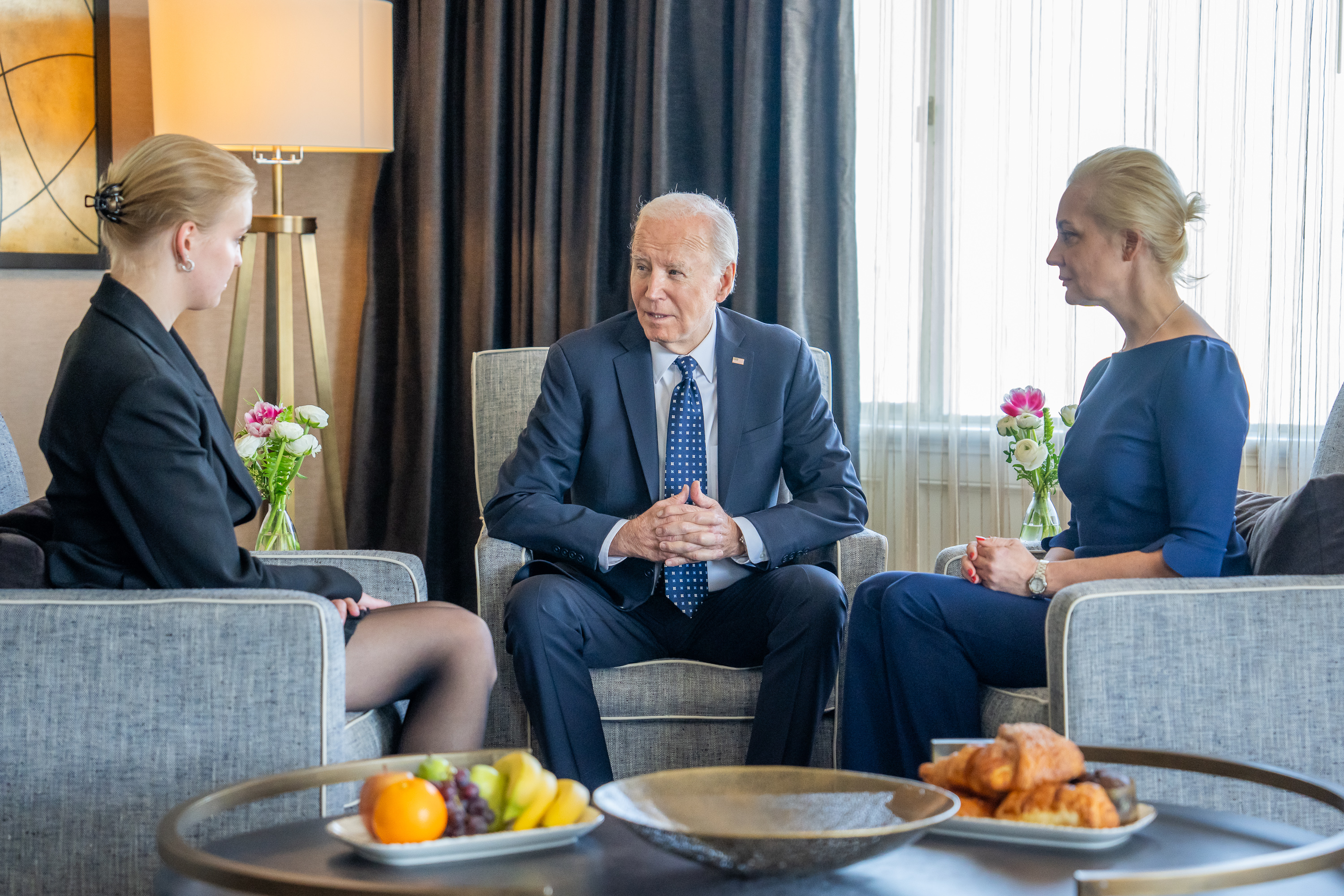
Daria Navalnaya, Joe Biden, and Yulia Navalnaya

After her father's death on 16 February 2024, Navalnaya and her mother met with U.S. President Joe Biden in San Francisco on 22 February 2024, where he expressed his condolences and announced additional sanctions against Russia.

In April 2024, Navalnaya appeared at a Stanford University screening of Daniel Roher's Academy Award-winning documentary Navalny, taking part in a panel discussion afterwards with Roher and former U.S. ambassador to Russia Michael McFaul.

On 3 May 2024, Navalnaya accepted the McCain Institute's Courage and Leadership Award for her father at the institute's Sedona Forum in Arizona; the award was presented by Jack McCain, the son of the late U.S. senator of the same name, and former Obama administration adviser David Axelrod.

=== 2024 U.S. presidential campaign ===
In August 2024, Navalnaya joined the 2024 presidential campaign of Vice President Kamala Harris as a field organiser based in Philadelphia, Pennsylvania. Her duties included voter mobilisation and community outreach. British author and former government adviser Alastair Campbell, who met her at a public event in Norway later in 2024, described her position on the campaign as that of a volunteer and reported that she was disappointed by Harris's loss to Donald Trump.
