= Karamzin =

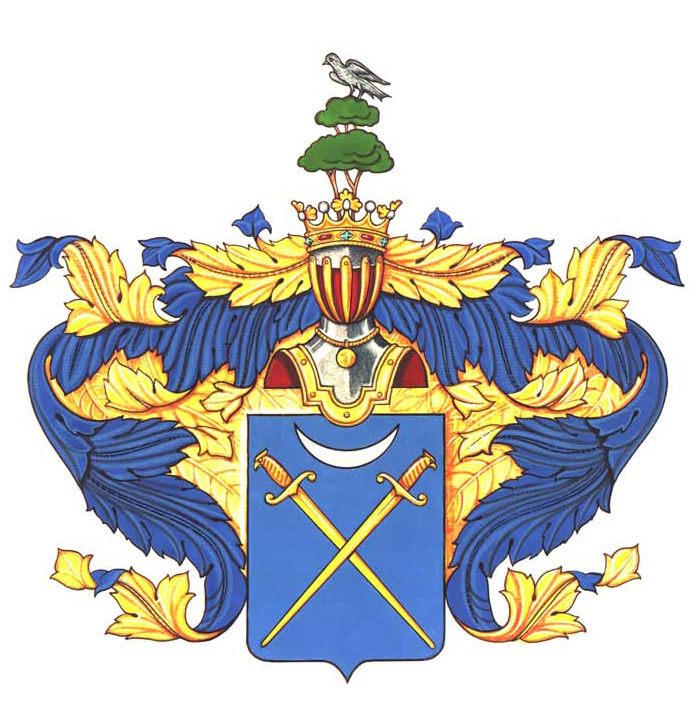
Coat of Arms of the Karamzin family

The Karamzin family is a noted Russian noble family of Tatar origin. It originates from the Tatar name Kara-Murza, meaning black lord. Karamzin (Russian: Карамзин) is also a Russian masculine surname; its feminine counterpart is Karamzina.

== Notable members ==
- Aurora Karamzin (1808–1902), Finnish-Swede philanthropist, wife of Andrei Karamzin, a son of Nikolay
- Nikolay Karamzin (1766–1826), Russian writer, poet, historian and critic
