= Sven Jürgenson =

Estonian diplomat

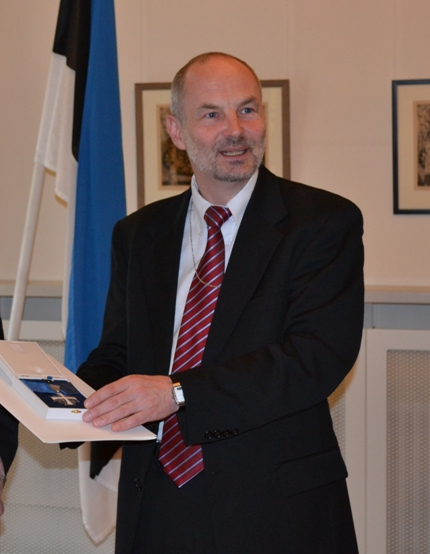

Permanent Representative to the United Nations in New York of Estonia
- In office 13 August 2015 – 29 August 2022
- Preceded by: Margus Kolga
- Succeeded by: Rein Tammsaar
- In office 1998–2000
- Preceded by: Trivimi Velliste
- Succeeded by: Merle Pajula

President of UNICEF
- In office 2016–2016
- Preceded by: Maliha Lodhi
- Succeeded by: Walton Alfonso Webson

Personal details
- Born: 2 April 1962 (age 64) Tartu, then part of Estonian SSR, Soviet Union
- Profession: diplomat

Sven Jürgenson (born 2 April 1962) is an Estonian diplomat. He served as the Permanent Representative to the United Nations in New York of Estonia from 1998 to 2000 and once again from 2015 to 2022. In 2016, he was also the President of the UNICEF Executive Board at the international level. He served as Ambassador to the United States from 2000 to 2003 and as Ambassador to France from 2010 to 2015.

== Career ==
Sven Jürgenson studied data processing at the Tallinn Polytechnic Institute and the Dresden College of Engineering between 1980 and 1987. He was a researcher and analyst in data processing at the Tallinn Polytechnic Institute and the Estonian Institute from 1987 to 1991.

In 1991 he joined the diplomatic service of Estonia, and was posted to Helsinki 1991–1993 and to Vienna 1993–1995. He was Director of the Division for Security Policy and International Organizations and Deputy Political Director at the Ministry of Foreign Affairs 1995–1996 and Director General of the Political Department 1996–1998. Additionally, he served as non-resident Ambassador to Turkey 1996–1998.

He was Permanent Representative to the United Nations in New York from 1998 to 2000 and Ambassador to the United States also accredited to Canada and Mexico from 2000 to 2003. He was Under-Secretary for Political Affairs from 2003 to 2006, Foreign Policy Adviser to the President of Estonia from 2006 to 2010 and Ambassador to France from 2010 to 2015. From 2015 to 2022, he was the Permanent Representative to the United Nations in New York, and he was elected President of the UNICEF Executive Board for the term 2016.

He speaks English, German, French, Finnish and Russian. He is married and has three children.
