= Kara-Murza =

Kara-Murza (Russian: Кара́-Мурза́) is a surname of Tatar origin translated as "Black Prince" (Black "murza"). The Russian surname "Karamzin" was derived from the name. Notable people with the surname include:

- Kristapor Kara-Murza (1853–1902), Armenian composer
- Sergey Kara-Murza (theatre critic), Russian theatre critic and lawyer
- Sergey Kara-Murza (1939–2025), Soviet/Russian historian, chemist and philosopher
- Vladimir Kara-Murza Sr. (1959–2019), Soviet/Russian TV anchor
- Vladimir Kara-Murza (born 1981), Russian journalist and opposition politician
