= Alexei Gorinov =

Russian lawyer and political prisoner

- Алексей Горинов
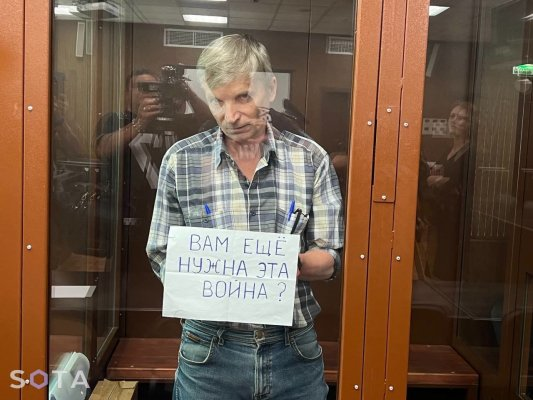
- Gorinov displaying his poster during the July 2022 trial: "Do you still need this war?"
- Born: 26 July 1961 (age 65); Moscow, Russian SFSR, Soviet Union
- Citizenship: Russian
- Education: Moscow State University of Geodesy and Cartography; Kutafin Moscow State Law University
- Political party: Solidarnost

Alexei (Note: Sometimes transliterated as Alexey, Aleksei or Aleksey) Aleksandrovich Gorinov (Russian: Алексей Александрович Горинов; born 26 July 1961) is a Russian lawyer and deputy of Moscow's Krasnoselsky District Council.

In July 2022, he was sentenced to seven years in prison for speaking out against a proposal to hold a children's dance and drawing competition despite the ongoing Russian invasion of Ukraine. It was the first court sentence in years under tough new laws introduced by Russia in the early days of the invasion. Gorinov was the first convict who did not admit his guilt in protest against this invasion. In November 2024, he was sentenced to three additional years in prison, on charges of "advocating terrorism".

== Biography ==
Gorinov was born on 26 July 1961 in Moscow. He graduated from the Moscow State University of Geodesy and Cartography in 1984, and the Kutafin Moscow State Law University in 2004. From 1990 to 1993, Gorinov was a municipal deputy of the Dzerzhinsky district in Moscow. Since 2017 he has been representing the Krasnoselskiy district as an independent deputy supported by the Solidarnost movement. Gorinov is a member of the Solidarnost movement. He was the CEO of ZAO Vinette Trading.

== Criminal prosecution for the antiwar statement ==
=== The session of the Deputy Council ===
On 15 March 2022, soon after the start of the Russian invasion of Ukraine, during the debates on a children's art competition at the fifth session of the Deputy Council of Krasnoselsky Municipal District, Gorinov made an antiwar statement: “How can we talk about a children’s drawing contest for Children’s Day, or organizing dance recitals for Victory Day when there are children dying every day?” Gorinov asked his colleagues at the meeting. “For your information, I will say that nearly 100 children have already died in Ukraine, and that every day, more children are being orphaned. The grandchildren and great-grandchildren of World War II survivors have been thrown into the fire of these combat operations. I believe that all of the efforts of our civil society should be directed exclusively at stopping the war and getting the Russian troops out of Ukraine.”

Gorinov declared that during the war with Ukraine such a competition would look like a “feast during the plague”. He was supported by the head of the municipal district Yelena Kotyonochkina who was also prosecuted and has since left Russia. During the session, Gorinov called the Russian invasion of Ukraine a war, not a “special military operation”, and said that children are dying in Ukraine.

=== Criminal proceedings ===
On 4 March 2022, Russian President Vladimir Putin signed into law a bill introducing prison sentences of up to 15 years for those who publish "knowingly false information" about the Russian armed forces and their operations.

On 26 April 2022, law enforcement officials arrested Gorinov and searched his home and the council building. The criminal case investigation took 5 days from 26 April to 1 May.

The court hearing on Gorinov's case began in June in the Meshchansky District Court of Moscow. The prosecutor requested to extend Gorinov's arrest to 6 months, and although Gorinov told the court he had tuberculosis and that he did not get appropriate medical care in the pre-trial detention centre, the judge accepted the request for the extension.

Some of the proceedings were heard in closed court. The prosecution declared that the audience members and journalists could put “psychological pressure” on the prosecution's witnesses.

The prosecution claimed that Gorinov colluded with Kotyonochkina at the council meeting in order to “discredit” Russian soldiers.

Gorinov's defence claimed that Roskomnadzor’s requirement not to call the war a war only applies to the media. No laws contain such requirements for individuals.

On 8 July 2022, judge Olesya Mendeleeva of the Meshchansky court sentenced Gorinov to seven years of imprisonment in a general-regime corrective colony. The announced sentence was met with applause in support of Gorinov, after which his supporters were taken out of the courtroom.

During the court hearing, Gorinov openly condemned the Russian invasion of Ukraine: “I believe that in the 20th century, Russia went beyond its limit on wars. Yet our present is Bucha, Irpin, Hostomel. Do these names mean anything to you? To you, the prosecution! Look them up and don’t say later that you didn’t know anything. For five months Russia has been waging war and shamefully calling it a special military operation. We have been promised victory and glory. Then why does a considerable part of my compatriots feel shame and guilt? Why has our country gained so many foes? Perhaps there is something wrong with us? Let’s discuss that. In fact, that is just what I did at the local council meeting of deputies. And the majority of those present have expressed their agreement! And now I am being tried in court.”

During the hearing on 19 September 2022, Gorinov's sentence was reduced by one month to 6 years and 11 months. This happened because of the changed wording in the accusation against the deputy: the version that a “group of people” (namely, Gorinov and Kotenochkina) “acted in collusion”.

In his final statement, Gorinov admitted his guilt before the people of Ukraine for not being able to prevent the war and said that the possibility of instituting criminal proceedings for pacifist views “brings shame to Russia”.

In late November 2022, Gorinov was transferred to Corrective Colony No. 2 in Pokrov, Vladimir Oblast. It is the same colony where the civil activist Konstantin Kotov and politician Alexei Navalny were imprisoned. The lawyer Maria Eismont worked on Kotov's case and visited Corrective Colony No. 2 several times. She believes the colony administration in Pokrov tries to prevent inmates from contacting their lawyers.

On 29 November 2024, Gorinov was sentenced to three additional years in prison, on charges of "advocating terrorism". In December judge Olesya Mendeleeva was sanctioned by the United States.

In March 2025, Rosfinmonitoring added Alexei Gorinov to the list of terrorists and extremists. On 3 April 2025, Gorinov said in his speech before the military appeals court that the real terrorists "are those who started this criminal war, this bloody massacre that has left hundreds of thousands dead or maimed on both sides."

=== Opinions on the sentence ===
In 2022, the independent human rights project “Support for Political Prisoners. Memorial” recognised Alexei Gorinov as a political prisoner.

Bruce Millar, Amnesty International’s Eastern Europe and Central Asia Deputy Director, believes that the sentence is “an unlawful reprisal for expressing his views”, and Gorinov “did not commit any internationally recognised crime by calling the war unleashed by Vladimir Putin on Ukraine what it is, a criminal war”.

Human rights defender Marina Litvinovich says that Gorinov's sentence is meant to make an example and intimidate deputies and other civil servants so no people in power would dare to speak out against the war.

Gorinov himself believes the court's sentence cannot be compared with the damage Russia caused to Ukraine: “An unimaginably long time? Yet try to recall how many people have been affected by the war in Ukraine, taking from them years of normal, peaceful life, and for some, taking their life, and then multiply the two. Try to imagine, try to understand the cosmic scale of events that we are talking about here. That same amount of responsibility rests on everyone, including me. And the least I can do, is to say things as they truly are.”

=== Deterioration of health ===
Prior to his arrest, Gorinov's health was poor: several years before he had a lung surgery. Gorinov's health deteriorated because of the conditions of his imprisonment and inability to get decent medical help. On 9 December 2022 he fell ill. After two days in the infirmary, Alexei did not get better, he still had fever and shortness of breath. After a public outcry, the prison administration agreed to transfer Alexei to the hospital of Corrective Colony No. 3 in the Vladimir Oblast. The hospital pertains to a colony known for torturing inmates. The politician Alexei Navalny was also transferred here for treatment in April 2021. He subsequently underwent several other transfers, including Ekaterinburg and Novosibirsk. In prison he contracted tuberculosis and pneumonia. He is currently in prison between corrective colony of Rubtsovsk and Barnaul prison hospital (Altai Krai, Siberia).

== Family ==
Alexei Gorinov is married and has a son.

== International recognition ==
In November 2022, Gorinov received the Magnitsky Award. Since 2015, it has been given to public figures who contributed to the defence of human rights.

In early 2023, 34 members of the European Parliament (including representatives of Lithuania) signed an open letter supporting Gorinov. At the end of January of that year, Gorinov wrote a letter to Patriarch Kirill of Moscow, stating that it would be appropriate for the patriarch to disapprove of the ongoing war in Ukraine, instead of supporting it (Don't you sometimes betray God with your silence ).

On 20 and 21 January, more than 20 countries saw rallies in support of political prisoners in Russia, including Alexei Gorinov.

In February 2023, the UN, in response to a complaint submitted by human rights defenders, called for Alexei Gorinov to be immediately released and demanded that the Russian authorities conduct an independent investigation.

Gorinov was nominated for 2025 Nobel Peace Prize, "for his courage and commitment to peace demonstrated in captivity."

== See also ==
- Ilya Yashin
- Russian 2022 war censorship laws
