= Kyle Parker (congressional staffer) =

- Known for: Magnitsky Act

Kyle Parker is a US congressional staffer and secondary drafter of the Magnitsky Act. He was the chief of staff of the US Helsinki Commission from December 2017 to February 2019. In July 2018, he was one of 10 US diplomats Russia requested be released into their custody for interrogation, which Parker said he considered an "honor".
