= Margus Kolga =

Estonian diplomat

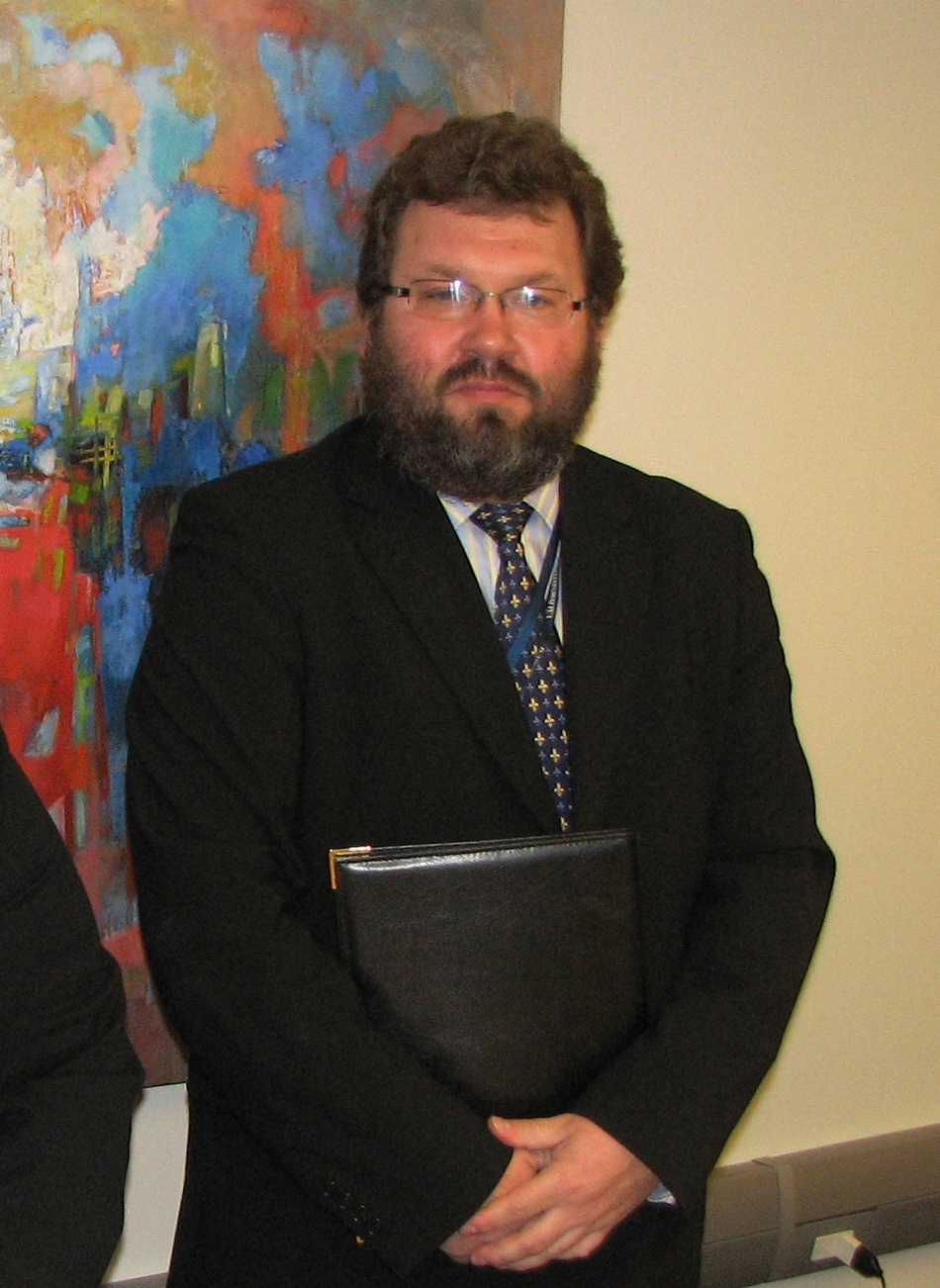
Margus Kolga (2012)

Margus Kolga (born 1 May 1966) is an Estonian diplomat. He graduated from the University of Tartu's Faculty of History in 1992. After graduation, he joined the Ministry of Defence of Estonia, where until 1994 he served as a desk officer in the Supply and Logistics Department. In 1994 he was promoted to the post of the Head of the Bureau of Defence Policy and from 1995 he worked as Head of the Department of the Security Policy. He served as the deputy (and acting) chancellor on defense policy for Estonia from 1996 to 2003. During this period Margus Kolga was actively involved in Estonia's NATO integration process and headed the Governmental Interagency Task Force for NATO membership. From 2003 to 2007 he worked as a senior research fellow in the Baltic Defence College and was responsible for the organising and support of the newly established Higher Command Studies Course (HCSC). In 2007 Margus Kolga joined the Ministry of Foreign Affairs of Estonia as the Director General of the 1st Political Department (Security Policy and International Organisations) until 2010. From 2010-2015 he served as the Permanent Representative of Estonia to the United Nations. In 2015 he was seconded to the State Chancellery to coordinate the drafting of the new Security Policy Strategy. In 2016 he returned to the Ministry of Foreign Affairs and took his position as head of the UN Security Council Campaign Task Force.

Since 2004 he has been a Co-chairman of the Estonian Defence and Military Terminology Commission and Member of the Military Educational Board of Estonia. From 2006 to 2011 he held the post of Academic Director for the Estonian State Defence Course, a course that aims to educate Estonian senior state officials, civil servants and opinion leaders in defence and security issues. After relinquishing his work in United Nations in 2015 he was nominated again to the post of Academic Director of the Course.

Margus Kolga is decorated with the Order of the White Star Fourth Class and the Service Cross of the Ministry of Defence First Class.

He has a wife, a son and two daughters.

== Controversy ==
In May 2003, he resigned his office following allegations that he abused his position, commissioning translations for the Ministry of Defence from a company owned by his wife. It was also alleged he shared state secrets with his wife and forged the signature of his superior.

In July 2003, he was convicted by the Tallinn City Court, having admitted his guilt, and fined 48,600 kroons.

== Notes ==
Diplomatic posts
Preceded by Tiina Intelmann	Permanent Representative of Estonia to the United Nations; 2010–2015	Succeeded by Sven Jürgenson
