= Carine Kanimba =

Carine Kanimba is a Belgian-American political activist, lawyer and speaker, who is also the daughter of renowned Rwandan opposition figure Paul Rusesabagina. After their parents were presumed killed in the 1994 Rwanda genocide, Carine and her sister Anaise Kanimba were adopted by Mr. Rusesabagina and his wife Taciana Rusesabagina. At the time, Rusesabagina was a hotel manager at the Hôtel des Mille Collines in Kigali, Rwanda and famously sheltered over 1000 Tutsis and moderate Hutus in the hotel during the Rwanda Genocide. His heroic acts are depicted in the 2004 movie Hotel Rwanda. While her father's victimization and torture by the Rwandan government has been at the forefront of her activism, Carine has also broadened her focus to include issues of international justice, the protection of political prisoners, and the role of international organizations in holding governments accountable.

== Early life and Family ==
Carine was born in Kigali in May 1993. She and her elder sister Anaise are the biological daughters of Tatiana's brother. Their parents were both of Tutsi ethnicity, the tribe that was heavily targeted by Hutu Rebels in the massacre. Both of them are assumed to have been killed during the genocide, and Rusesabagina, who had received asylum in Belgium, adopted the girls and raised them as his own. The family moved to Brussels, Belgium in 1996 before relocating to San Antonio, USA which is their primary home today. Carine is an alumnus of North Western University, having graduated in 2016.

== Advocacy for Rusesabagina's Release ==
During her university years, Carine had been an active participant in human rights matters including serving on the board of directors for the NU Community for Human Rights. Her true foray into the public eye began after the arrest of her father in August 2020, when he was abducted on a flight he had been tricked to believe was headed to Burundi, and flown blindfolded to Kigali. Carine quit her job as an investment banker in order to help raise awareness about her father's plight and mobilize resources to get him released. Using the de facto slogan #freeRusesabagina, her efforts mainly involved pushing for powerful foreign governments to intervene and compel Paul Kagame's government to release her father. Rusesabagina was put through trial for alleged terrorism charges and in September 2021 sentenced to 25 years in prison. A key element of Carine's campaign has been her ability to galvanize support from high-profile figures and institutions. She enlisted the help of celebrities such as Don Cheadle (who played Mr. Rusesabagina in Hotel Rwanda), Scarlett Johansson, Enes Kanter Freedom and Mark Ruffalo to help amplify her concerns about her father's welfare. She also spoke on several occasions in front of important delegations including the US Congress, the European Parliament and various forums relating to democracy and human rights. As a result of Carine and her family's advocacy, a number of breakthroughs materialized. In May 2022, the US declared Rwanda a “hostage-taking nation,” a designation that came with a host of conditions meant to compel the Rwandan government to release Rusesabagina. In August 2022, U.S. Secretary of State Antony Blinken visited Rwanda and had discussions with Kagame's government about Rusesabagina. The campaign had also mobilized many other sources of pressure from the highest levels of western governments. Eventually, Kagame agreed to commute Rusesabagina's sentence in March 2023 though it emerged that he had been coerced into a confession and promise that he would not criticize the government any more.

== Wider Advocacy Work and Recognition ==
Carine has done a multitude of interviews and talks with major news networks and humanitarian organizations, raising awareness about the human rights abuses perpetrated not only on her family but on Rwandan citizens in Rwanda. Her work has attracted scrutiny and intimidation from elements within the Rwandan government, who she believes to be heavily connected across the globe. She has spoken about being followed physically, getting her house broken into and her phone getting hacked. In 2021, she was informed by digital rights group CitizenLab that her phone had an infestation of NSO Group spyware Pegasus. She believes that the Rwandan government was able to use the software to listen in on sensitive, private conversations including with US Representative Joaquin Castro and Belgian foreign minister Sophie Wilmes. Aside from harassment and death threats perceived to be from the Rwandan Government, Carine has been the victim of vicious online trolling and abuse from supporters and enablers of Kagame's rule. For example, in an interview with Michela Wrong at the 2020 Oslo Freedom Forum, Carine recounted a Rwandan government official posting online that she “deserves a golden machete”, an apparent insinuation that she should be killed in the same way her parents and a million other people were killed during the Rwandan genocide. Carine's work in human rights advocacy has been recognized globally and has received various awards including the Heroes of Democracy Award from the Renew Democracy Initiative and the Global Magnitsky Justice Award for Young Human Rights Activists. Carine continues to raise awareness about corrupt government practices that are little known about outside the small East African country, and is a big advocate against overt government surveillance on citizens.
