= Elena Servettaz =

Elena Servettaz (Russian: Елена Серветтаз; born 1983) is a Russian French journalist and a news anchor at Radio France Internationale, where she covers international relations and French and Russian politics, with an emphasis on the Russian opposition movement and high-profile political cases, including those of Sergei Magnitsky, Mikhail Khodorkovsky, Alexei Navalny and Pussy Riot. She is also the Paris correspondent for the Russian radio station Ekho Moskvy.

A graduate of Moscow State University and the French Press Institute (Paris), Servettaz began her journalistic career at the age of 18 on the political talk show "Freedom of Speech" on Russia's NTV television channel. She was also the parliamentary correspondent and special reporter for Moscow Channel 3. She has contributed to several media organizations, including Le Figaro, ELLE, The Interpreter, France 24, and the BBC, as well as to the Russian television channel TV Rain and Kommersant FM radio. In 2012, Elena served as deputy editor-in-chief of the high-end Russian-language magazine Russian Riviera published in France by RR Editions.

In 2013, Elena Servettaz published her first book, "Why Europe Needs a Magnitsky Law", a collection of essays in support of the adoption of EU visa sanctions against Russian human rights abusers. World-famous politicians such as John McCain, Benjamin Cardin, and Boris Nemtsov took part in Elena’s book project.

In 2017, Elena Servettaz was invited to join the Mikhail Khodorkovsky’s team. Elena then created and launched the Open World project – media on social media platforms such as Facebook, VKontakte, Instagram, and YouTube. The Open World – Otkrytyi Mir – decided not to have a home page as its audience is mainly based in Russia.

In 2021 the project was forced to close as the Federal Service for Supervision of Communications, Information Technology and Mass MediaRoskomnadzor mentioned “connection with undesirable organizations. To protect its journalists Mikhail Khodorkovsky decided to finish the project.

Until the beginning of the Russian invasion of Ukraine Elena Servettaz was working for the liberal Echo of Moscow radio station, considered one of the last independent media in Russia. Echo Moscow was shortly taken off-air after Russia’s invasion of Ukraine.

In March 2022 Elena Servettaz joined True Russia, the Foundation of actor Mikhail Baryshnikov, writer Boris Akunin, and economist Sergey Guriyev, who stand for the immediate end of the war in Ukraine and help those affected by the military aggression of Russian armed forces.

In June 2022 Elena Servettaz became a permanent reporter at SWI swissinfo.ch, the international unit of the Swiss Broadcasting Corporation (SBC). With its 10 languages, SWI potentially reaches about 75% of the world’s population. She mainly works as a reporter for the beat Foreign Affairs but also contributes to the French editorial team.

In June 2024, she published a groundbreaking investigation uncovering how the Swiss Attorney-General’s Office (OAG) failed to thoroughly investigate millions of dollars in dirty Russian money tied to the Magnitsky case—a massive international tax fraud scandal. The investigation revealed that, despite evidence linking over $10 million in suspicious transfers to Swiss accounts, Swiss prosecutors chose not to pursue these funds. The investigation faced intimidation attempts from some of the protagonists cited. Six months after the publication, the Parliamentary Assembly of the Council of Europe (PACE) presented a report highlighting how Swiss authorities mishandled the case.
