= Anaïse Kanimba =

Rwandan activist

- Occupation: Human rights activist

Anaïse Kanimba is a Rwandan activist who advocated for the release of her father, Paul Rusesabagina, a dissident who was detained by the Rwandan government.

Anaïse Kanimba, and her sister Carine Kanimba, are the adopted daughters of Paul Rusesabagina, the hotel manager who inspired the film Hotel Rwanda. Their father adopted the girls after their biological parents were murdered during the 1994 Genocide. The family has remained Belgian citizens and permanent US residents since the atrocity. However, in August 2020, Paul Rusesabagina was kidnapped by the Rwandan government and has been detained for over two years. He has been subjected to torture and forced to make false confessions. The United Nations and many other human rights groups have vehemently condemned his imprisonment.

The sisters filed a lawsuit in December 2020 against the Greek aviation company that provided the plane for Rwandan authorities to transport Rusesabagina back to Kigali.

The sisters have continued lobbying for their father's release, petitioning international human rights groups. Kanimba has experienced harassment in retribution for her work to free Rusesabagina and clear his name.

In October 2023, Yvonne Uwera, a Rwandan human rights activist published the book "RESCUING THE HERO: A Daughter’s Quest to Free The Hotel Rwanda Legend", ISBN 979-8863644448 about the Carine Kanimba's relentless fight to free her adoptive father, Paul Rusesabagina
