= Yulia Navalnaya =

Russian economist and political activist (born 1976)

- Юлия Навальная
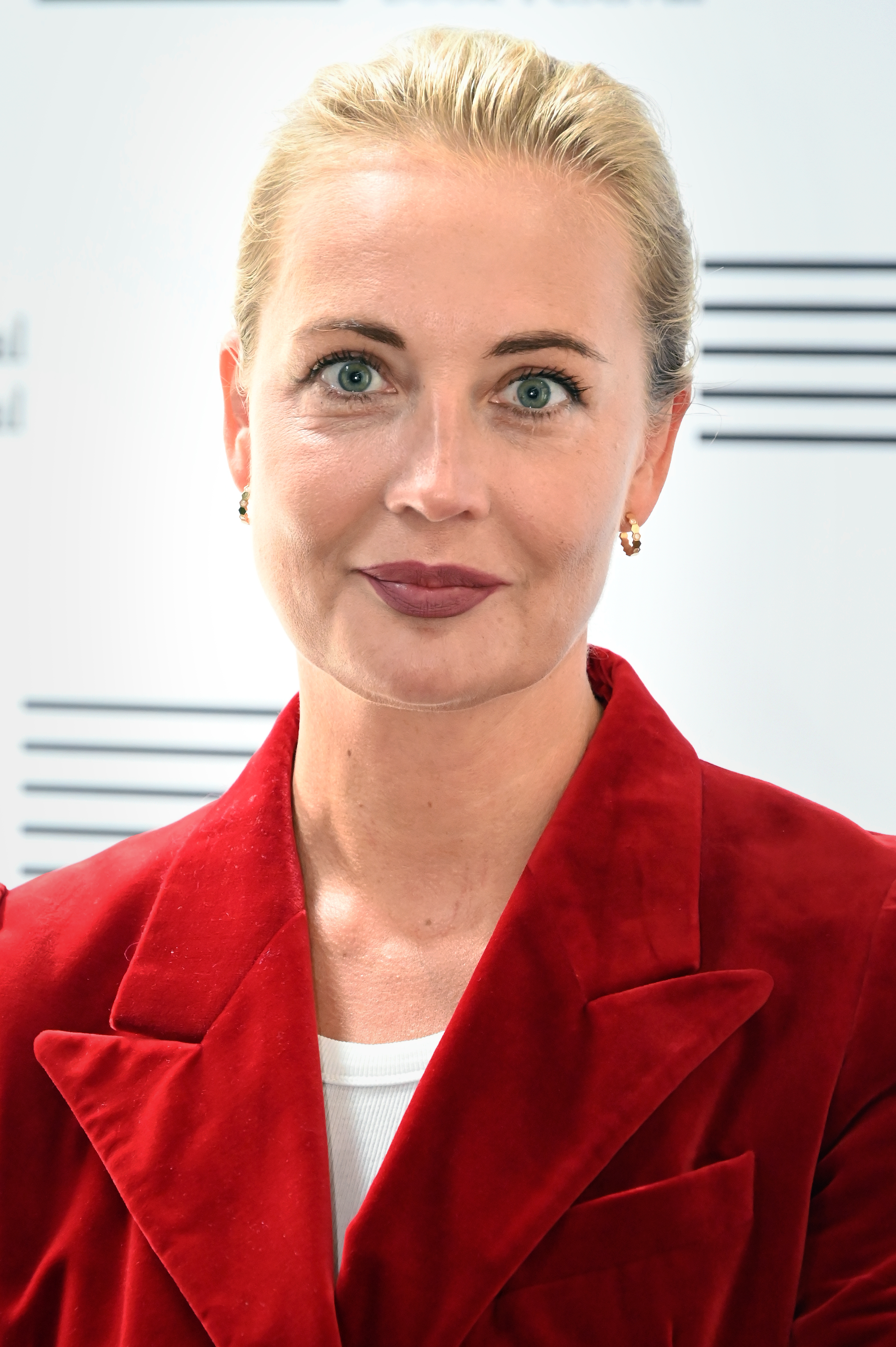
- Navalnaya in 2025
- Born: Yulia Borisovna Abrosimova; 24 July 1976 (age 50); Moscow, Soviet Union
- Education: Plekhanov Russian University of Economics
- Occupation: Economist
- Known for: Russian opposition leader in exile (since 2024); Alexei Navalny's wife
- Political party: Russia of the Future (2013–present)
- Other political affiliations: Yabloko (2000–2011)
- Spouse: Alexei Navalny (m. 2000; died 2024)
- Children: 2
- Awards: Magnitsky Human Rights Awards; Award of the Patriarchate of Constantinople; DW Freedom of Speech Award
- Website: yulianavalnaya.com

Yulia Borisovna Navalnaya (née Abrosimova; Russian: Юлия Борисовна Навальная, née Абросимова, IPA: [ˈjʉlʲɪjə nɐˈvalʲnəjə]; born 24 July 1976) is a Russian political activist and economist. The widow of Russian opposition leader Alexei Navalny, she has been described in media as the "first lady" of the Russian opposition. After her husband's death, Navalnaya announced that she would continue his work, while naming herself as another leader of the Russian opposition in exile, when she fled Russia to Germany in March 2021, after the Russian government's crackdown on protesters following Navalny's arrest and imprisonment. As of 1 July 2024, she has been serving as the chairperson of the Human Rights Foundation, while also heading the Anti-Corruption Foundation, which her late husband, Alexei Navalny, had founded in 2011.

== Early life and education ==
Navalnaya was born Yulia Borisovna Abrosimova on 24 July 1976 in Moscow, Soviet Union, in the family of scientist Boris Aleksandrovich Abrosimov (1952–1996) and Alla Vladimirovna Abrosimova. Her mother worked for the Ministry of Light Industry; her parents divorced when Navalnaya was in fifth grade, and her mother married a second time, to an employee of the USSR State Planning Committee.

Navalnaya graduated from the Faculty of International Economic Relations of the Plekhanov Russian Economic Academy. She later served an internship abroad and undertook postgraduate studies.

== Career ==
Navalnaya worked for some time at a Moscow bank.

=== Supporting her husband ===
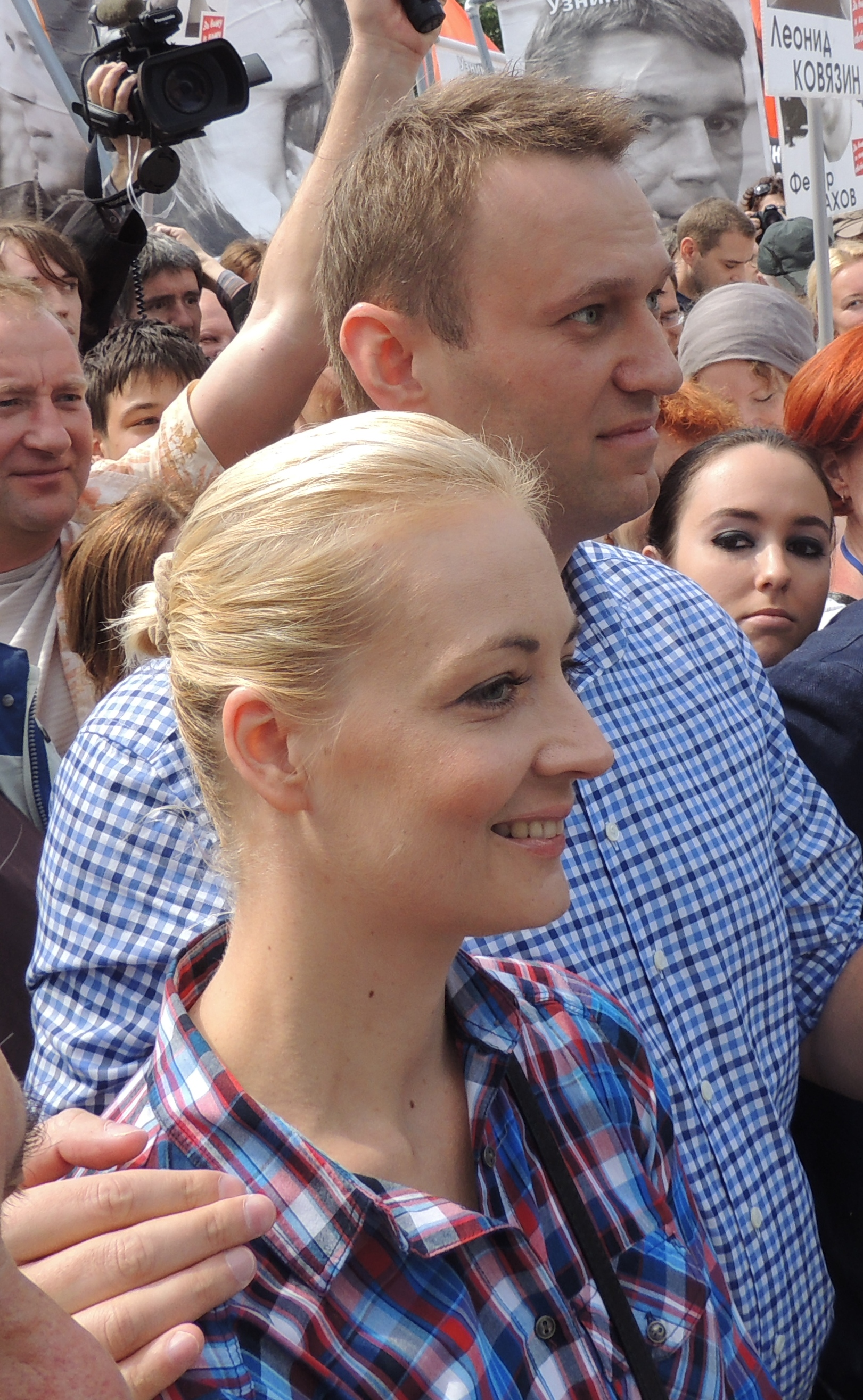
Navalnaya with Alexei Navalny at a 12 June 2013 march in Moscow

In 2000, Navalnaya, together with her husband Alexei Navalny, joined the Yabloko party, which she left in May 2011.

After 2007, Navalny gained fame in Russia as a blogger and opposition politician. Navalnaya became the first secretary and assistant to her husband. The family's life became noticeably more public, so that Navalnaya was in the spotlight as the "first lady of the Russian opposition". Observers note that she never tried to position herself as an independent figure: Navalnaya always behaves like a devoted wife and companion ("the Decembrist's wife"), ready for harsh statements and decisive actions if her husband needs it, but not directly related to politics. She spoke at several political rallies; she called the head of the National Guard of Russia, Viktor Zolotov, who in September 2018 challenged Alexei Navalny to a "duel", as a "thief, coward, and impudent bandit."

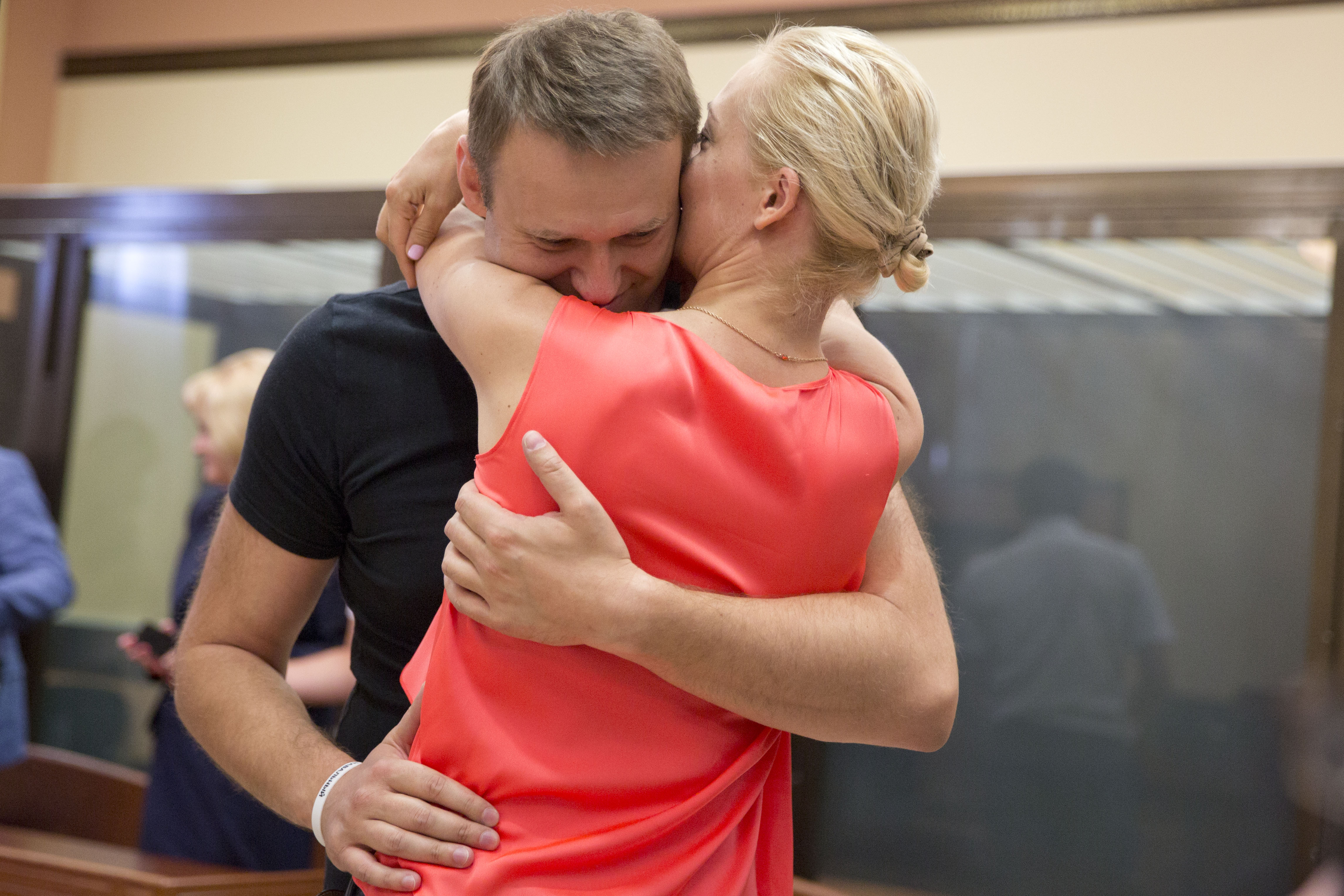
Navalnaya and Navalny hugging after Navalny's release from custody after a successful appeal to the prosecutor's office on 19 July 2013

Navalnaya attracted close public attention in the late summer and early fall of 2020, when her husband was urgently hospitalized in Omsk following Novichok poisoning. She demanded that Navalny be immediately transferred to Germany for medical treatment and even turned directly to Russian President Vladimir Putin. After German experts confirmed Navalny's poisoning, Russian physician Leonid Roshal said that no poisonous substance was found in Navalny's samples in Russia and suggested creating a Russian-German team on this matter. Navalnaya accused him of acting "not as a doctor, but as the voice of the state." She followed her husband to Berlin, was with him at the Charité hospital, and Navalny later posted a message, "Yulia, you saved me." Novaya Gazeta and its audience named Navalnaya its 2020 Hero of the Year.

In January 2021, Navalnaya returned to Russia with her husband. After Navalny was detained at the border control, she made a statement that the arrest and the closure of the airport in Vnukovo were a manifestation of the Russian authorities' fear of Navalny. "Alexei said that he is not afraid", she said. "— And I'm not afraid either. And I urge you all not to be afraid." Later, Navalnaya accused the security officials of "persecut[ing] [her] as the wife of an enemy of the people." She wrote on Instagram: "The Year of '37 has come, and we did not notice." On 21 January, Navalnaya announced that she would attend the 2021 Russian protests to demand the release of her husband. On 23 January, she was detained by the authorities but released the same evening.

On 16 February 2024, the Russian prison service announced that her husband had died in prison at the IK-3 penal colony in Yamalo-Nenets, north of the Arctic Circle. His supporters suspected that he had been tortured in prison, and they, along with Western world leaders, believe that prison officials murdered him on the eve of an arranged prison swap with a German prisoner. Navalnaya vowed that she would continue his work after his death.

On 9 July 2024, Russia's Basmanny District Court ordered the arrest of Navalnaya (who was not in or living in Russia at the time) for "participating in an extremist community". Days later, she was placed on Russia's official list of terrorists and extremists.

=== Independent political career ===
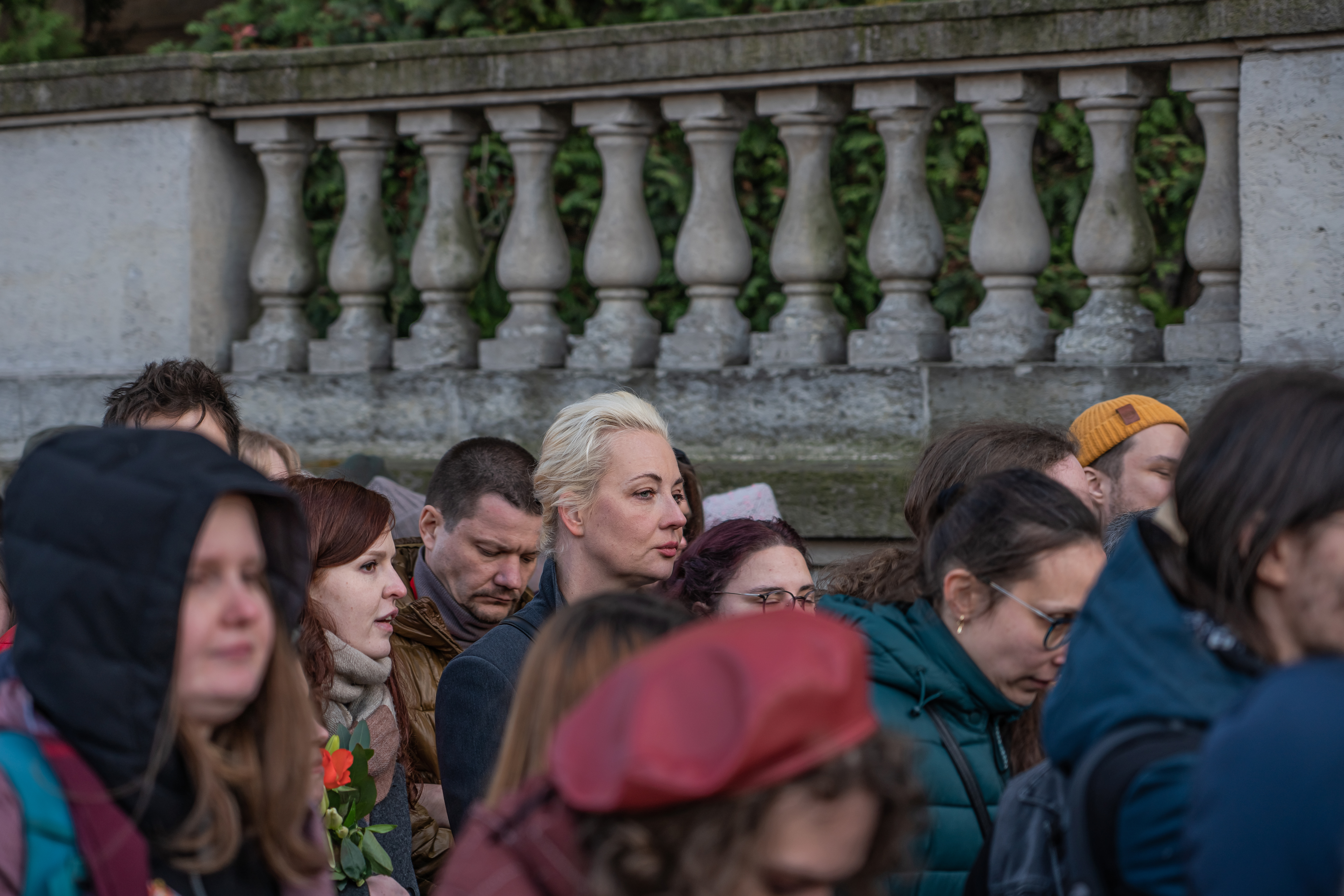
Navalnaya at the «Noon Against Putin» protest in front of the Russian Embassy in Berlin during the 2024 Russian presidential election, 17 March 2024

In September 2020, after the poisoning of Navalny, multiple opinions began to appear, suggesting that Navalnaya was preparing to play an independent political role and might become the "Russian Tsikhanouskaya" — the leader of the entire opposition. Political analyst Konstantin Kalachev stated in January 2021 that Navalnaya's role had changed: "From the wife of a politician, she is herself becoming a politician"; "she has charisma and charm, and can easily replace her husband if necessary." Political strategist Abbas Gallyamov compared Navalnaya to Corazon Aquino, the wife of the main opposition leader in the Philippines who opposed the regime of Ferdinand Marcos, the dictator who ruled the Philippines for twenty years. Additionally, there were also opinions that such a turn of events is unlikely.

In January 2021, the Kremlin-controlled channel Tsargrad TV issued a public threat to Navalnaya, blackmailing her by stating that it would publish intimate files of Alexei Navalny unless she promised "not to become Tsikhanouskaya in Russia" and "not to play political games."

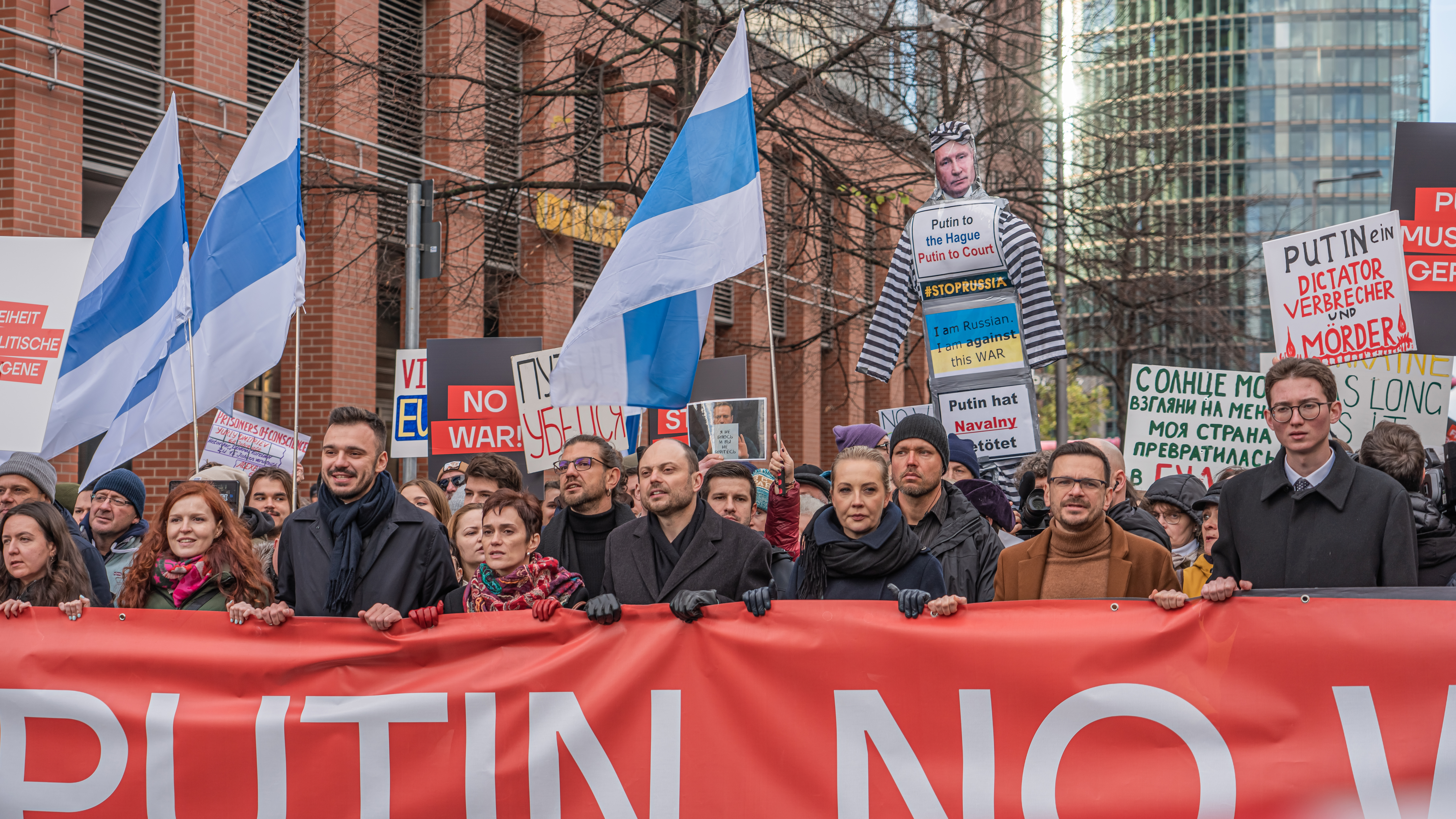
Navalnaya, Vladimir Kara-Murza, Ilya Yashin, and Ruslan Shaveddinov at an anti-war protest in Berlin, 17 November 2024

After hearing reports of her husband's death in February 2024, Navalnaya, who had been attending the Munich Security Conference, subsequently gave a speech in which she said that if her husband had died, Putin and his allies would "be brought to justice." Soon afterward, she published a video online stating that she plans to continue her husband's political work, and asked Russians to rally around her as they did around her husband, saying: "I want to live in a free Russia, I want to build a free Russia." On 28 February 2024, Navalnaya addressed the European Parliament after being invited by EP president Roberta Metsola. During her speech, she accused Vladimir Putin of having orchestrated her husband's murder and said that European leaders need to "stop being boring" and innovate if they want to defeat Putin.

Navalnaya leads the Anti-Corruption Foundation, which was founded by her husband in 2011. On 1 July 2024, Navalnaya was announced as the chairperson of the Human Rights Foundation, succeeding chess grandmaster, human rights advocate, and one of the most renowned Russian opposition figures, Garry Kasparov.

On 21 October 2024, on the eve of launching Navalny's memoir Patriot, Navalnaya gave an interview to the BBC, in which she stated that she would stand for president of Russia once Putin was no longer in power. She said that she would like to see Putin behind bars, punished for his crimes. She said that the Anti-Corruption Foundation (now led by her) has evidence that will be released once all of the details have been collected.

On 17 September 2025, Navalnaya published a video in which she suggested that her husband was murdered in prison by Vladimir Putin's forces.

Since December 2025, and especially since the spring of 2026, Navalnaya launched a series of online videos critical of the Russian government, supporting a smart voting strategy in the upcoming September elections.

== Recognition and influence ==
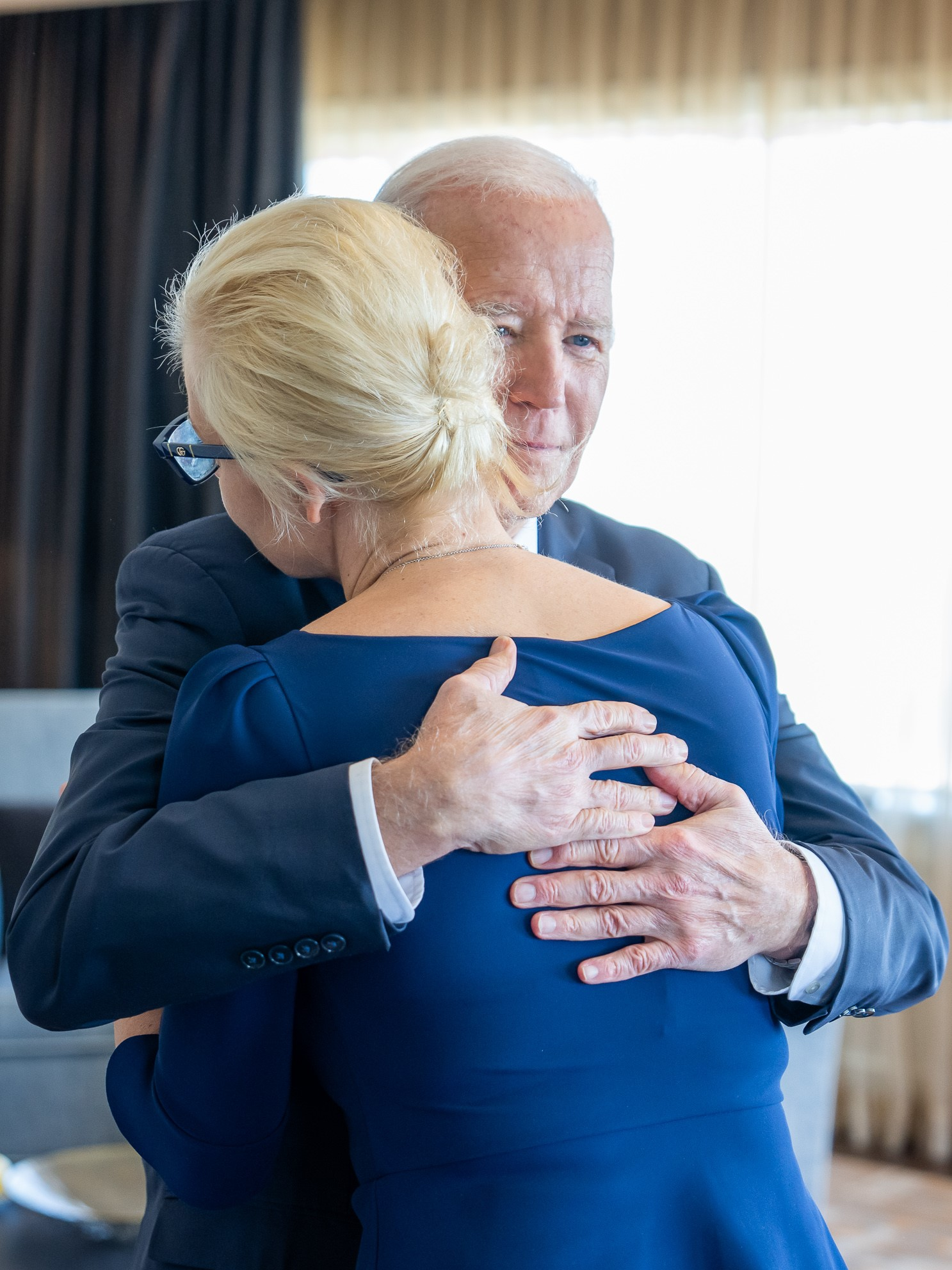
President Joe Biden hugs Yulia Navalnaya in San Francisco, California, on 22 February 2024

In 2015, Navalnaya was ranked 67th in the list of the top 100 most influential women in Russia by Echo of Moscow. After Alexei Navalny received a suspended sentence, the opinion was expressed that Navalnaya could nominate herself for the presidency instead of him. According to Russian public figure Ksenia Sobchak, in 2018 she offered this option to Navalny, but he rejected it saying "votes are not handed over."

In 2020, Novaya Gazeta and its audience named Navalnaya its Hero of the Year. In the same year, Russian writer Dmitry Bykov said that Navalnaya reminded him of the heroine of Lyudmila Petrushevskaya: she "faces circumstances stronger than her, but some miracle helps her to defeat the world's evil."

Key European media outlets have closely followed her activity and quoted her posts on social networks.

In April 2024, Time listed her as one of the 100 most influential persons of 2024.

On 3 June 2024, she received the Human Rights Prize from Oslo Freedom Forum on behalf of her late husband. In her speech, she said that "I would wish that this prize was not necessary. But dictators around the world continue killing freedom fighters."

She was one of 338 nominees and one of bookmaker's favorites for the 2025 Nobel Peace Prize.

Other awards include:

- Magnitsky Human Rights Awards (2024)
- Award of the Patriarchate of Constantinople (2024)
- DW Freedom of Speech Award, awarded to Yulia Navalnaya and the Russian Anti-Corruption Foundation (2024)
- La Vanguardia Prize (Premios Vanguardia), International category (2024)

== Personal life ==
In the summer of 1998, while on vacation in Turkey, Navalnaya met Alexei Navalny, a lawyer, also a resident of Moscow. In 2000, she and Navalny were married, and the couple had a daughter Daria Navalnaya and a son Zakhar. She helped her husband's parents in their business related to basket weaving. After 2007, Navalnaya did not officially work anywhere, calling herself "the main one in matters of everyday life and raising children."

Aside from her native Russian, Navalnaya is fluent in English.

Additionally, Navalnaya revealed in a September 2025 interview with The Sydney Morning Herald that she was also poisoned with deadly nerve agent, Novichok, although not as severely as Alexei Navalny.

Since her husband's death, she runs Navalny's YouTube channel.

Navalnaya was prevented from seeing her husband for two years leading up to his death. On 16 February 2024, the Russian prison service announced that Navalny had died in prison. The vast majority of the international community, including physicians, forensic experts, and other experts, believe that he was murdered. In September 2025, she uploaded a video on X (formerly Twitter) that claimed that 2 labs independent of each other concluded Navalny was poisoned prior to his death.
