= European Youth Event =

- Nickname: EYE
- Status: Active
- Genre: Debates, festivals, conferences, exhibitions
- Frequency: Biennial
- Venue: European Parliament
- Location: Strasbourg
- Country: France
- Years active: 12
- Inaugurated: 9 May 2014
- Most recent: 13–14 June 2025
- Participants: Young people aged 16 to 30 years
- Attendance: 5000-10000
- Organiser: European Parliament
- Website: europeanyouthevent.eu

The EYE (European Youth Event) is an international event initiated and hosted by the European Parliament, with the aim of stimulating active citizenship amongst young Europeans.

The EYE is an event encompassing thousands of young people from across the European Union and beyond to discuss Europe’s present and future that takes place every two years at the European Parliament in Strasbourg. The EYE allows 16- to 30-year-olds to engage directly with Members of the European Parliament, to exchange views with decision-makers, experts and other young people.

During the event, participants take part in activities co-created with institutions, international organisations, civil society, youth organisations and the participants themselves, offering a space for discussions and networking. EYE2027, the seventh edition of this event, will take place on 18 and 19 June 2027, offering plenty of interactive activities, including debates, workshops, visits, artistic performances - both inside the European Parliament and in the EYE Village. The sixth in-person and most recent edition of the event took place on 13-14 June 2025. The previous edition took place on 9-10 June 2023 with several follow-up events taking place in the following months.

The EYE also provides year-round online activities that create opportunities for wider public discussions on the most pressing issues facing Europe today.

== Objective of the EYE ==
The EYE allows 16- to 30-year-olds from all across Europe to exchange views with decision-makers, experts and other young people, to inspire and get inspired.

== EYE Hearings and Youth Mainstreaming Activities ==
After the event, some participants can further develop the most popular ideas and present these directly to MEPs during the EYE Hearings.

During the Hearings, MEPs give feedback to former EYE participants on which ideas they endorse, plan to implement in the future or disagree with.

Outside of the EYE, young people also have opportunities to share their views and expertise directly with the Committees of the European Parliament.

Throughout the year, selected youth mainstreaming activities bring youth perspectives into parliamentary discussions and policymaking.

== EYE Report ==
Following the EYE, the ideas of the young people attending are collected in the EYE Report and distributed to all Members of the European Parliament (MEPs).

To collect and highlight the ideas and suggestions of the participants, a team of young journalists, coordinated by the European Youth Press and with a political commentary from the European Youth Forum - have written these reports in 2014, 2016 and 2018.

In 2021, the European Parliament collected over 1,500 ideas and proposals from young citizens on the website youthideas.eu. The most popular ideas from consultations with young people, chosen by the EYE editorial team, were taken to EYE2021 and further developed by participants during brainstorming sessions. From these, 20 ideas were selected and all EYE participants, both onsite and online, voted for the top 5 ideas, which were presented at the EYE's closing session. The report was presented to the Conference on the Future of Europe and the Members of the European Parliament to serve as inspiration for the political debate and future policy proposals.

For EYE2023, ideas and proposals were also collected through youthideas.eu, where young people could submit suggestions for new policies and projects for a better Europe. From March 2023, the proposals were collected, approved and edited and organised into 11 topics: climate change and environment, culture and media, democracy, education, the EU in the world, health and sports, human rights, jobs, economy and digital transformation, migration, security, and social justice. During EYE2023, the Ideas Hub next to the Hemicycle provided a space for participants to share and discuss their ideas, with experts from EU institutions and youth organisations offering guidance. More than 600 ideas and 400 comments were shared on the platform, from which the 15 most popular ideas were selected and presented in the Youth Ideas Report.

== Yo!Fest ==
During the first three EYE editions, the Yo!Fest was organised by the European Youth Forum alongside the main event. The content of Yo!Fest was designed and delivered by youth organisations and youth groups from across Europe.

== Sustainability and accessibility ==
The EYE works to promote equality, inclusiveness and sustainability with a strong commitment to accessibility for everyone. The event aims to implement solutions that make it sustainable and environmentally friendly and to accommodate the needs of the participants. In 2021 and 2023, the EYE obtained the ISO 20121 certification for sustainable event management.

At EYE2025, measures included ecologically designed event elements, a programme co-created with young people and a Code of Conduct and Trusted Person to help ensure a safe and inclusive environment. Accessibility measures included International Sign Language interpretation, hearing loops, adapted facilities for people with reduced mobility and a quiet room.

== Editions ==
=== EYE2014: Ideas for a better Europe ===
The first edition, the European Youth Event 2014 (#EYE2014), saw the participation of 5,000 young Europeans, 400 speakers and many supporting partners and youth associations who came to the Parliament's premises in Strasbourg on 9–11 May 2014 to share their ideas and thoughts on a multitude of youth-related topics.

The EYE2014's five main themes included youth unemployment, the digital revolution, sustainability, European values and the future of the European Union.

=== EYE2016: Together we can make a change ===
The second edition (#EYE2016) was held on 20–21 May 2016 and was an occasion for Europe's youth to make their opinions heard on many issues, offering political debates and workshops with decision-makers.

This edition saw 7,500 young people from across Europe debating topics ranging from space and innovation to climate change, migration and democracy.

The EYE2016's five main themes were: War and Peace: Perspectives for a peaceful planet; Apathy or Participation: Agenda for a vibrant democracy; Exclusion or Access: Crackdown on youth unemployment; Stagnation or Innovation: Tomorrow's world of work and Collapse or Success: New ways for a sustainable Europe.

=== EYE2018: The plan is to fan this spark into a flame ===
The third edition (#EYE2018) took place on 1–2 June 2018.

At EYE2018, 8000 young Europeans engaged in various activities, revolving around the event's five main themes: Young and old: Keeping up with the digital revolution; Rich and poor: Calling for a fair share; Apart and together: Working out for a stronger Europe; Safe and dangerous: Staying alive in turbulent times; Local and global: Protecting our planet.

Young Europeans also had the opportunity to participate online by sharing their ideas about the future of Europe via the European Youth Ideas website.

=== EYE2020: online edition ===
The European Parliament decided to postpone EYE2020, originally planned for May 2020, given the exceptional measures taken concerning the COVID-19 outbreak. To compensate for the postponement, the European Parliament presented a special online edition of the event.

The first series of EYE Online events took place between early April and the end of May 2020, and offered a variety of activities focusing on topics including mental health, future of education, food of tomorrow and rural renewal, fake news, slow shopping, future of work, mass surveillance and vaccination.

During this period, more than 60 live activities were streamed online. Speakers included Christine Lagarde, David Maria Sassoli and numerous Members of the European Parliament.

Following the success of this virtual event, it was decided that EYE Online events would take place regularly.

=== EYE2021: The future is ours ===
The fourth edition (#EYE2021) took place on 8–9 October 2021 and brought together 5,000 young people at the European Parliament in Strasbourg and another 5,000 online in order to discuss over 2,000 ideas to shape the future of Europe.

EYE2021 was the culmination of the European Parliament's youth consultation process for the Conference on the Future of Europe. Started in May 2021, in collaboration with pan-European youth organisations, young people's ideas on the future of Europe were collected on youthideas.eu.

The most popular 20 ideas from EYE2021 were presented to the Members of the Conference and input into the political debate within the European Parliament.

=== EYE2023 ===
The fifth edition (#EYE2023), attended by 8,500 young individuals, convened at the European Parliament in Strasbourg on June 9-10 for EYE2023, engaging in discussions and idea-sharing sessions regarding the future of Europe. Accompanied by experts, activists, and decision-makers, participants had the opportunity to interact and gain inspiration amidst the setting of European democracy.

The event, comprising over 300 activities including debates, networking opportunities, and artistic performances, focused on themes such as democracy and youth engagement, considering the upcoming European elections in 2024. The top 15 ideas from the event were collated in the Youth Ideas Report, reviewed by three young editors, and presented to MEP's during a European Youth Hearing in Brussels later in the year.

EYE2023 united 8,500 participants in Strasbourg, with online attendees. The event showcased 400 speakers across 300 activities in the European Parliament and the EYE Village. Notable attendees included 31 MEPs, 3 EP Vice-Presidents, and EP President Roberta Metsola, with 22 artistic performances.

=== EYE2025 ===
The sixth in-person edition (#EYE2025) took place at the European Parliament in Strasbourg on 13–14 June 2025, bringing together around 9,000 young people onsite and approximately 13,000 online. Participants aged 16 to 30 represented 133 nationalities, with 87% coming from EU Member States and 13% from EU candidate countries and other parts of the world.

Taking place one year after the 2024 European elections, EYE2025 focused on the European Parliament's legislative priorities and provided opportunities for young people to exchange views with Members of the European Parliament and other policymakers. The programme featured 450 activities, including panels, workshops, tours, Q&As, quizzes, stands and performances, organised around the three areas of the EU Youth Strategy: Engage, Empower and Connect.

Around 40 MEPs, including three Vice-Presidents of the European Parliament, and around 250 speakers took part in the event. Speakers included European Commissioner Glenn Micallef, European Commission Executive Vice-President Henna Virkkunen, European Ombudsman Teresa Anjinho and democracy activist Daria Navalnaya. The EYE Village, coordinated by the European Youth Forum, offered additional activities, networking opportunities and evening concerts.

== See also ==
- European Parliament
- European Youth Forum
- European Parliament Youth Offer
- Euroscola
- European Charlemagne Youth Prize
