= List of organizations designated as terrorist or extremist by Russia =

Below is the Russian list of terrorist and extremist organizations.

== Terrorist organizations ==
As of May 2026, the following organizations, both domestic and foreign, are designated as terrorist according to the law of the Russian Federation. Organizations are listed along with the year of the Court decision that led to their designation.

1. Supreme Military Majlis ul-Shura of the United Mujahideen Forces of Caucasus (2003)
2. Congress of the Peoples of Ichkeria and Dagestan (2003)
3. Al-Qaeda (2003)
4. Osbat al-Ansar (2003)
5. Egyptian Islamic Jihad (2003)
6. al-Jama'a al-Islamiyya (2003)
7. Muslim Brotherhood (2003)
8. Hizb ut-Tahrir al-Islami (2003)
9. Lashkar-e-Taiba (2003)
10. Jamaat-e-Islami (2003)
11. Taliban movement (Note: Removed from the list of terrorist organizations in 2025) (2003)
12. Turkistan Islamic Party (formerly Islamic Movement of Uzbekistan, 2003)
13. Jamiat al-Islah al-Idzhtimai (2003)
14. Society of the Revival of Islamic Heritage (2003)
15. al-Haramain (2003)
16. Jund al-Sham (2006)
17. Islamic Jihad – Jamaat Mujahideen (2006)
18. al-Qaeda in the Islamic Maghreb (2008)
19. Caucasus Emirate (2010)
20. Autonomous Combat Terrorist Organization (2013)
21. Right Sector in Crimea (2014)
22. Islamic State of Iraq and the Levant (2014)
23. Al-Nusra Front (2014)
24. People's Militia named after Minin and Pozharsky (2015)
25. Adzhr ot Allaha Subhanu ua Tag'alya SHAM (2015)
26. Aum Shinrikyo (2016)
27. Mujahidins of Jama'at al-Tawhid wal-Jihad (2017)
28. Chistopol Jamaat (2017)
29. Rohnamo ba sui Davlati Islomi (2018)
30. Network (2018)
31. Katibat al-Tawhid wal-Jihad (2019)
32. Hayat Tahrir al-Sham (2020)
33. Krasnoyarsk Jamaat (2019)
34. National Socialism / White Power (2021)
35. Terrorist community created by Maltsev V.V. from among the participants of the Interregional public movement "Artpodgotovka" (2021)
36. Red Plowman Jamaat (2021)
37. Columbine International Youth Movement (2022)
38. Khatlon Jamaat (2021)
39. Muslim religious group of the village of Kushkul, Orenburg (2022)
40. Noman Çelebicihan Battalion (2022)
41. Azov Regiment (2022)
42. Islamic Renaissance Party of Tajikistan (2022)
43. People's Self-Defense (2022)
44. Dubai Jama'at (2022)
45. Moscow cell of ISIS (2022)
46. Armed wing of the Batal Hajji Belkhoroev wird (2022)
47. Maniacs Cult of Murder (2023)
48. Freedom of Russia Legion (2023)
49. Aidar (2023)
50. Russian Volunteer Corps (2023)
51. Georgian National Legion (5 April 2024)
52. Dnipro-1 Regiment (25 June 2024)
53. Jamaat (Note: "established in the correctional facility of the Federal Penal Colony No. 7 of the Federal Penitentiary Service of Russia in the Republic of Dagestan") (23 July 2024)
54. "A terrorist community created by employees of the Main Directorate of Intelligence of the Ministry of Defense of Ukraine and operating in the city of Enerhodar, Zaporizhzhia Oblast" (5 Sept. 2024)
55. The Concept of A.N.V. (Avant-garde of the People's Will) (20 Aug. 2024)
56. Islamic Bakkiya (Note: A "Separate combat unit of the international terrorist organization "Islamic State"") (19 Sept. 2024)
57. Russian structural unit of Aum Shinrikyo (23 Sept. 2024)
58. 46th separate assault battalion "Donbas" of the Armed Forces of Ukraine (21 Nov. 2024)
59. Ahl al-Sunna wa-l-Jamaat (Note: According to the FSB, it was "created in the correctional institution of the FKU IK-2 of the Federal Penitentiary Service of Russia in the Republic of Kalmykia") (21 Nov. 2024)
60. Free Nations of Post-Russia Forum "and its structural divisions" (28 Dec. 2024)
61. 2nd Special Forces Battalion "Donbass" (30 Jan. 2025)
62. National Liberation Movement "Right Sector" (Note: Also includes two "structural subdivisions": the organization "Right Youth" and the association "Volunteer Ukrainian Corps "Right Sector"" (other name: DUK PS) (1 Mar. 2025)
63. People's Communist Movement (8 May 2023)
64. "A terrorist community created to prepare and commit sabotage and terrorist acts against the security of the Russian Federation in the territory of the city of Perm in order to assist the Security Service of Ukraine and Ukraine" (27 July 2025)
65. Megion Jamaat (21 Nov. 2023)
66. Antisocial Distancing public organization (6 May 2025)
67. Antisocial Distancing rock band (6 May 2025)
68. Free Russia Forum (23 June 2025)
69. "Join the VKP(B)" and its "structural division", the Omsk cell of the VKP(B) (18 Nov. 2024)
70. Kastuś Kalinoŭski Regiment "and its structural units" (25 Aug. 2025)
71. Congress of People's Deputies (16 Jan. 2026)
72. Anti-Corruption Foundation (12 Feb. 2026)
73. Anti-War Committee of Russia (4 Apr. 2026)
74. Transbaikal Leftist Union (13 May 2026)
75. "SxE Allies from Ufa" (26 May 2026)
76. Chechen Republic of Ichkeria and its "structural subdivisions" (Note: "Structural subdivisions" of the Chechen Republic of Ichkeria include: State Committee for the De-occupation of the ChRI; Ministry of State Security of the ChRI; Parliament of the ChRI; Ministry of Internal Affairs of the ChRI; Ministry of Justice of the ChRI; Ministry of Foreign Affairs of the ChRI; Ministry of Defense of the ChRI; Ministry of Economy and Finance of the ChRI; Ministry of Information, Communications, and the Press of the ChRI; Ministry of Health and Social Welfare of the ChRI, National Bureau of Investigation of the ChRI; Department of Culture of the ChRI; Department of Youth Affairs and Sports of the ChRI; ChRI Consulates in Latvia, Poland, Ukraine, the Czech Republic, and Turkey; ChRI Representative Offices in Austria, Belgium, Great Britain, Germany, Lithuania, Norway, Poland, Finland, France, Turkey, and Sweden.) (17 Apr. 2026)

=== Groups listed as "terrorist organizations" as part of the Free Nations of Post-Russia Forum ===
- Free Nations League
- Alliance/Coalition (of Indigenous Peoples)
- Assembly of National Revival
- Northern Union
- Free Idel-Ural Confederation
- Northern Eurasia Movement (the Government of the Confederation of Northern Eurasia in exile)
- Civic Council
- Association of Indigenous Peoples of the Russian Federation
- International Committee of Indigenous Peoples
- Aboriginal Forum Association
- Confederation of the Caucasian Union
- Movement "Union of Peoples for Liberation"
- Movement "Ostropa Center"
- ABN – Anti-Imperial Bloc of Nations
- Congress of the Peoples of the North Caucasus
- Union of Black Earth States
- Prison of Peoples Movement
- Divisible Russia Project
- After Empire Project
- Asians of Russia Foundation
- Northern Confederation of Ostscandia Movement
- Confederation of North Caucasus Peoples/Free Kavkaz (Caucasian Federation)
- (Buryatia) Buryat National Democratic Movement
- (Buryatia) Congress of the Buryat People
- Movement for the Independence of Buryatia "Tusgaar Buryaat-Mongolia"
- (Buryatia) "Buryat Information Center"
- (Buryatia) Buriad Gurun Foundation
- Erkheten Buryatia Movement
- (Buryatia) Buryat Independence Committee
- Free Buryatia Foundation
- (Sakha Republic) Movement for the Independence of the Republic of Sakha (Independent Sakha Movement)
- Committee of Independence of the Republic of Sakha
- (Sakha Republic) Free Yakutia Foundation
- New Tyva Foundation
- Bashkir National Political Center (BashNatsPolit)
- Committee of the Bashkir National Movement Abroad
- Free Bashkortostan Movement
- Independent Government of Tatarstan (in exile)
- All-Tatar Public Center
- Democratic Republic of Siberian Tatars Movement
- Tatar Independence Party "Ittifak"
- (Tatarstan) Tatar Renaissance Party (Yanarysh Tatar halyk partiyase)
- (Tatarstan) Movement for Freedom "TatPolit"
- (Chuvashia) Movement "Irĕklĕ chăvash en – Free Volga Bulgaria" (Irĕklĕ Palkhar – Free Volga Bulgaria, Irĕklĕh)
- Movement "Diplomatic Council of Chuvashia – Volga Bulgaria",
- Organization "Court named after the Archangel Michael"
- (Chuvashia) Organization "Private Court "Kebe""
- Karelian National Movement (Karelian National Liberation Movement, Karjala & Saami, Karjalan Tašavalta/Tazovaldkund/Tazavaldu, Karjalan kansallinen like, Stop the occupation of Karelia, Karelian Kandalaksha)
- Green Gendarmerie 2.0 Movement
- Congress of the Oirat-Kalmyk People (Oirat Republic, Free Ulus, Free Kalmykia)
- Committee of Representatives of the Moksha People in Emigration (Moksha National Committee)
- Mokshen Mastor Movement
- Erzya Mastor Movement
- Erzya National Congress
- Movement "For the Independence of the Republic of Mari El" (Shkesham)
- Free Movement "Nogai-El"
- Movement "Nogai Republic" (Movement "Free Nogaistan" International Nogai Organization "Supreme Council of the Nogai People")
- Movement "Nogai National Political Center"
- Movement "Free Circassia" (Great Circassia, Republic of Circassia, Council of United Circassia)
- Political Movement "Circassian Congress"
- Movement "Meryania" (Merjamaa, Merämaa, Tuiban Kerdo)
- Movement "Ilanviima (Revival of Self-Consciousness of Merya)"
- Movement "Republic of Meshchera"
- Movement "Fennoscandia & Væringjavegr" (Fennoscandia)
- Movement "Suur Suomi – Great Finland" (Greater Finland)
- Movement "Suur-Suomen Sotilaat" (Soldiers of Greater Finland),
- Movement "For the Independence of the Komi Republic" ("Doryam asnymos – Let's Defend Ourselves")
- Community "Komi Daily"
- Northern Eurasian Solidarity Alliance/NESA (North Eurasia Solidarity Alliance)
- Dagestan National Center
- Azatlyk/Freedom Association
- Government of the Chechen Republic of Ichkeria in Exile
- (Chechen Republic of Ichkeria) World Chechen Congress
- United Force Movement of the United Diaspora of the Chechen Republic of Ichkeria
- Caucasian Union
- Mountain Republic Movement
- (Udmurtia) Udmurt Eriko Movement
- Free Udmurtia Movement
- (Udmurtia) National Liberation Movement of the Udmurt Republic "Sod Yus"
- Repatria Public Committee
- Alan Turkic Platform Association
- (Chechen Republic of Ichkeria) International Philanthropist Foundation "Ichkeria"
- VolgaDeutsche Movement
- Seversky Krai-Kursk Land Movement (KuNR)
- Independent Vepsia Association
- (Nenets Autonomous Okrug) Nenets Federation Association (Nenets Republic)
- Kumukia Republic
- Enesai Republic
- Tabasaran State
- Free Vyborg Movement (Vyborg Republic, Vapaa Viipuri)
- Nizhny Novgorod Republic Movement
- Kursk People's Republic Movement
- Yelets Autonomous Republic (Lipetsk Autonomous Republic Movement)
- Oryol Autonomous Republic Movement
- Belgorod People's Republic Movement (Belgorod Land)
- Orenburg People's Republic Movement
- Saratov Republic Movement (Volga Republic)
- Samara People's Republic Movement
- Voronezh Republic Movement (Chernozem Republic-Yugorussiya, Yugorus, Yugo-Russian Republic, Chernozemye Federation)
- (Autonomous Republic of Crimea) Crimean Republic Movement (Kyrym Respublikasy)
- Novgorod Republic Movement (Holmgard Republic, Gardarika Republic, Novgorod Republic)
- Pskov Republic Movement (Free Pskov, Roglandia)
- Yugra Republic Movement (Yugra-Tyumen Federation, Lanmaria, Lanmar Federation)
- Free Lapland Movement (Kolandia, Lapland Republic)
- Raspberry Wedge – Independent Kuban Movement
- Free Kuban Movement
- Kuban (Circassia) Coordination Council
- Green Wedge – My Fatherland
- Yellow Wedge-Volga Federation Movement (Zhovtiy Klyn)
- Don and Volga Federation Movement (Kon(Federation) Volga Region, Volga Federation)
- Gray Wedge-Siberian State of Ukrainians Movement
- Ingria Movement (Free Ingria, Ingermanland)
- Federative Siberia Movement (United States of Siberia, Federated States of Siberia, Free Siberia, SBS Siberia, Free Siberia, Committee of the Independent Confederation of Siberia, Movement for the Liberation and Independence of Siberia)
- Siberian Liberation Movement
- Bjarmaland Movement (Bjarmaland, Bjarma, Biarmia, Bjarma, Bjarmland, Pomorskaya Sloboda, Pomor Republic, Free Pomorie)
- Ural Platform Movement
- Ural Republic Movement (Ural Federal Republic)
- Free Homeland
- South Ural Republic Movement
- Pacific Federation Movement
- Zalesskaya Republic Movement (Zalesskaya Rus)
- Republic of Moscovia Movement (Moscow Republic)
- Moscow Liberation Movement
- (Kostroma Oblast) Kostromskaya/Kostroma Republic Movement (Independent Kostroma)
- (Tver Oblast) Tverskaya Zemlya Movement (Tver Republic, Tver People's Republic)
- East Krivskaya Platform (Note: An alliance between the Pskov Republic, Smalandia (Smolensk Land), and Tver Land.) Movement
- Movement "OVOD Freedom and Will" (Novgorod Veche Republic)
- Don Republic/Cossackia Movement (Cossackia)
- Great Don Army Movement
- Movement "Yazykovyy Yertaul" (Orenburg Army, Orenburg Cossack Circle, Orenburg Cossack Republic)
- Movement "Verkhne-Yaitskaya Line"
- Movement "Kuban Cossack Army" (Free Cossack Kuban movement "Group 91")
- Baltic Republican Party
- Movement "Republic of Koenigsberg" (Baltic Republic, Free Koenigsberg)
- Movement "Far Eastern Republic" (Republic of Pereslavia)
- Movement "Primorsky Republic"
- Movement "Far Eastern Confederation"
- Movement "Borisoglebsk Rada"
- Movement "Taganrog Republic"
- Project "Independent Kuban People's Republic"
- Movement "Northern Brotherhood"
- (Jewish Autonomous Oblast) Project "Jewish Republic"
- Association "Vyatka Republic"
- Association "Stavropol Republic"
- Association "Perm the Great"
- Russian Partisan Movement "Black Bridge" (RPD "Black Bridge Support")
- Revolutionary Movement "Right of Force"
- Movement "Exposition of Revolutionary Anarchism" (E.R.A.)
- Movement "Atesh"
- Voronezh Republican Partisan Resistance
- Partisan Movement "Skrepach"
- Siberian Battalion
- Karelian National Battalion (Karelian National Battalion NORD)
- Company "Bashkort"
- (Chechen Republic of Ichkeria) Battalion named after Sheikh Mansur (Ukraine)
- (Chechen Republic of Ichkeria) Battalion named after Dzhokhar Dudayev
- (Chechen Republic of Ichkeria) Battalion named after Khamzat Gelayev
- (Chechen Republic of Ichkeria) Battalion named after Imam Shamil
- Turan Battalion
- Ingria Platoon
- Ingermanland Battalion (Ingermanland Battalion KILPI)
- Separate Special Purpose Battalion of the Armed Forces of the Chechen Republic of Ichkeria
- Ingush Liberation Army
- Military Wing of the Black Bridge Movement (War Bridge)
- Combat Wing of the Koenig Legion Warriors
- Bashkir Liberation Army
- Military Committee of the Caucasian Union
- (Ukraine) Bratstvo Battalion
- (Ukraine) Armenian Bagratuni Legion
- (Ukraine) (Georgia (country)) Caucasian Legion

== Extremist organizations ==
- Meta Platforms/Facebook/Instagram — in March 2022, a Moscow court designated the Meta Platforms as an extremist organization.
- "The international LGBT public movement" — On 30 November 2023, the Supreme Court of Russia, in a ruling prompted by a motion from the Ministry of Justice, declared what it calls "the international LGBT public movement" an extremist organization and banned its activities across the country. The ruling came after a closed-door hearing and no one from "the defendant's side" was present. After the "Movement" was banned, activists later created the "International LGBT Movement" to defend their interests.
- The "Anti-Russian Separatist Movement" — on 7 June 2024, the Supreme Court banned the "Anti-Russian Separatist Movement", supposedly "an international public movement to destroy the multinational unity and territorial integrity of Russia". However, the SOVA Research Center, which studies Russian anti-extremism policies, has noted that "there is obviously no single organization with a common structure called the Anti-Russian Separatist Movement".
- Pussy Riot — in December 2025, the Ministry of Justice added punk art-collective Pussy Riot to its list of extremist organizations.
- Memorial — On 9 April 2026, the Supreme Court, after a closed-door petition from the Ministry of Justice, banned "the Memorial international civic movement" as an extremist group. Memorial had previously been penalized for violations of the foreign agent law and ordered to shut down its human rights center and International Memorial in 2021. OVD-Info was declared a "subsidiary" of Memorial and banned as extremist organization despite having no links to Memorial.

== Individuals recognized as terrorists or extremists ==
In addition, Rosfinmonitoring (Russian Federal Financial Monitoring Service) maintains a list of individuals whom they recognize as "terrorists" or "extremists".

Following amendments to the Russian Federal Law "On Countering the Legalization of Proceeds from Crime and the Financing of Terrorism" (effective since June 1, 2023), the grounds for inclusion in the Rosfinmonitoring list of "terrorists and extremists" were significantly expanded. Individuals may now be added to the list not only after conviction but also while merely under investigation for certain offenses, including the "discrediting" of the Russian Armed Forces or other security agencies. The amendments also cover crimes committed on political, ideological, ethnic, or similar grounds.

List of known persons on the list of terrorists and extremists
№	Name	Profession	Category	Date recognized
10087	Alexei Navalny	Politician	Terrorism	25.01.2022
10086	Yulia Navalnaya	Politician	Terrorism	11.07.2024
10921	Maria Pevchikh	Politician	Extremism	16.08.2024
3419	Leonid Volkov	Politician	Terrorism	14.01.2022
15999	Kira Yarmysh	Politician	Extremism	16.08.2024
12531	Lyubov Sobol	Politician	Extremism	25.01.2022
7971	Denis Kapustin	Militant	Terrorism	15.03.2023
14990	Boris Akunin (Grigory Chkhartishvili)	Writer	Terrorism	18.12.2023
4103	Marat Gelman	Gallerist	Terrorism	14.11.2024
11132	Ilya Ponomarev	Politician	Terrorism	25.01.2023
6908	Garry Kasparov	Chess player, politician	Terrorism	06.03.2024
9067	Zalina Marshenkulova	Journalist	Terrorism	10.10.2024
4428	Gennady Gudkov	Politician	Terrorism	27.02.2024
8041	Tatyana Lazareva	Television presenter, comedian	Terrorism	19.06.2024
7824	Farida Kurbangaleeva	Television presenter	Terrorism	19.06.2024
17593	Karèn Shainyan	Journalist	Extremism	07.2023
7824	Sharlot	Musician	Extremism	23.07.2024
2657	Evgenia Berkovich	Film director	Terrorism	15.04.2024
10961	Svetlana Petriychuk	Playwright	Terrorism	15.04.2024
7095	Yevgeny Kiselyov	Journalist	Terrorism	22.02.2024
4306	Dmitry Gordon	Journalist	Terrorism	06.04.2022
14926	Yevgeniya Chirikova	Politician	Terrorism	20.02.2024
13388	Yana Troyanova	Film actress	Extremism	09.07.2024
7290	Ihor Kolomoisky	Oligarch	Terrorism	02.10.2023
12513	Artur Smolyaninov	Actor	Extremism	11.05.2023
10842	Alexey Panin	Actor	Terrorism	29.05.2024
4406	Lindsey Graham	Politician	Terrorism	20.02.2024
10381	Ilia Novikov	lawyer, player of "What? Where? When?"	Terrorism	25.07.2024
5741	Andrey Zayakin	Scientist	Extremism	15.11.2022
15017	Ruslan Shaveddinov	Politician	Extremism	25.01.2022
1470	Oleksiy Arestovych	Politician	Terrorism	11.05.2023
505	Arsen Avakov	Politician	Terrorism	02.10.2023
13524	Ivan Tyutrin	Politician	Terrorism	20.02.2024
10326	Dmitry Nizovtsev	Journalist	Extremism	16.08.2024
15730	Sarah Ashton-Cirillo	Journalist	Extremism	05.02.2024
5469	Ivan Zhdanov	Politician	Terrorism	14.01.2022
9666	Natalia Moseychuk	Journalist	Extremism	11.05.2023
11528	Vera Polozkova	Poetess		25.02.2025
8327	Dmitry Kolezev	Journalist	Extremism	26.07.2025
3465	Dmitry Bykov	Writer	Extremism	11.09.2025
15089	Pavel Syutkin	Writer	Extremism	17.09.2025
3593	Ilya Varlamov	Blogger	Extremism	22.09.2025
3879	Shahab al-Muhajir	leader of the Islamic State – Khorasan Province	Terrorism	26.06.2024
3949	Abu Bakr al-Baghdadi	Leader of the Islamic State	Terrorism	16.09.2015

== Monitoring ==
Rosfinmonitoring maintains searchable lists of organizations and persons, domestic and foreign, for which it has information about their association with extremist and terrorist activities.

== See also ==
- Federal List of Extremist Materials
- List of organisations banned in Russia
