= Die Weltwoche =

Swiss weekly news magazine

- Editor: Roger Köppel
- Categories: News
- Frequency: Weekly
- Circulation: 45,519 (2019)
- First issue: 1933; 93 years ago
- Company: Weltwoche Verlag AG
- Country: Switzerland
- Based in: Zollikon
- Language: German
- Website: www.weltwoche.ch
- ISSN: 0043-2660
- OCLC: 8341688

Die Weltwoche (German pronunciation: [diː ˈvɛltˌvɔxə], "The World Week", formerly known as the "Schumacher Press", after its founder) is a Swiss weekly magazine based in Zollikon, Canton of Zurich. Since 2006, it has been privately owned by Roger Köppel, a publicist, journalist and politician from the right-wing populist and conservative Swiss People's Party.

The magazine's regular columnists include the former president of the Social Democratic Party of Switzerland, Peter Bodenmann, as well as Christoph Mörgeli MP, a leading figure of the Swiss People's Party, and cultural and social commentator Alexander, Count of Schönburg-Glauchau. Other columnists have included Hans-Georg Maaßen, Thilo Sarrazin, Boris Reitschuster and Henryk M. Broder.

The magazine's editorial stance under Köppel is considered to range between economic liberalism and conservatism – regularly along the lines of the Swiss People's Party.

== History ==
Founded in 1933 as a weekly newspaper, in the mold of French weeklies, by Manuel Gasser and Karl Schumacher. Gasser was a member of the National Front and supported Hitler's Nazi Germany until the Anschluss. The weekly itself started off somewhat sympathetic to the Nazi government of Germany, but soon joined the other Swiss media in vigorously opposing it. Schumacher served as the editor-in-chief until 1953 while Glasser served as Weltwoche's cultural editor from its founding till the 1970s. During the Cold War, it took a pro-Western stance and in the 1960s and 1970s was noted for its dissenting opinions especially under Rolf R. Bigler (editor-in-chief from 1964 to 1968).

During the 1980s, the newspaper was led by Rudolf Bächtold and Jürg Ramspeck and owned by Jean Frey AG (owners since 1969). Weltwoche remained a fixture of the intellectual environment in Switzerland, publishing articles, columns and interviews on a wide range of topics, including politics, the economy, culture and science, generally from a center-left perspective. In 1987, Jean Frey was bought up by notorious entrepreneur and fraudster Werner Rey. After the collapse of Rey's holdings in 1991, the publisher was sold to Curti Medien Holding AG of Beat Curti, which in 1996 passed to Basler Zeitung which owned the newspaper until 2001. The last editor in chief before the takeover by Köppel was Fredy Gsteiger (1997 to 2001), under whom the newspaper pursued a general political position of center-left liberalism.

Köppel became editor-in-chief in 2001, launching a complete redesign, replacing the broadsheet by a magazine format. Jean Frey AG was now bought by conservative-right investor Tito Tettamanti. Köppel replaced most of the editors and re-positioned the magazine as neoliberal and right-wing conservative. In 2003, the new Weltwoche began to openly support Christoph Blocher and his Swiss People's Party. This resulted in a decline in sales, and Köppel was replaced by Simon Heusser, in 2005 followed by Jürg Wildberger.

In 2006, the Weltwoche was detached from Jean Frey AG, now published under its own label Weltwoche Verlag AG. The magazine was bought by Köppel, who now also returned as editor-in-chief, resulting in a renewed exodus of much of the editors. Since 2006, the paper has been run by Köppel directly and has acquired a thoroughly right-wing conservative focus.

In 2015, the editor-in-chief and owner Roger Köppel joined the strong right-wing Swiss People's Party. Shortly after, he was elected for Councillor of the Swiss Parliament and now stands in for the interests of the Swiss People's Party.

In May 2019, unknown perpetrators carried out a paint attack on the Weltwoche's headquarters. They sprayed red paint, a hammer and sickle symbol, and the words "Gegen rechte Hetze" (against right-wing hate speech) on the entrance door. On May 1, Weltwoche journalist Alex Baur was attacked by several people at a festival in Zurich.

Since 2021, Köppel has been running the Weltwoche Daily YouTube channel, where he shares his view of the world early every weekday morning.

In 2022, the headquarters of Weltwoche Verlags AG was relocated from Zurich to Zollikon.

== Profile and positions ==
Already distinguishing itself somewhat from the generally liberal, right-conservative, or center-left Swiss media by its general right-wing orientation, the magazine is now especially noted for its interviews with controversial public figures and for the diversity of opinion represented in its pages, with a dominant right-wing view however. For instance, virtually alone among Swiss publications, Die Weltwoche in 2003 and 2004 printed lengthy articles mainly arguing for the 2003 invasion of Iraq or the reelection of George W. Bush to the U.S. presidency. The accession of Switzerland to the European Union is rejected by the editorial staff, as was Swiss acceptance of the Schengen Agreement. The Weltwoche also represents the view that welfare and other state-administered assistance programs are inherently flawed.

Since 2006, Die Weltwoche has repeatedly actively created controversy and scandal. The magazine is somewhat anti-statist and against an expansion of the welfare state. It also rejects state-subsidized nurseries and childcare.

In keeping with neo-conservative and anti-mainstream positions, Köppel and Weltwoche do not accept the scientific evidence for global warming and have denounced recent "alarmism" surrounding environmental issues. It has for instance promoted Martin Durkin's climate change denial film The Great Global Warming Swindle (2007). Internationally – outside of Europe – the Weltwoche often represents pro-American and pro-Israeli positions. It promoted Donald Trump's false claims of electoral fraud during the 2020 United States presidential election.

On 12 January 2006, Die Weltwoche was the first German-speaking publication to reprint some of the controversial cartoons of Muhammad originally published by the Danish newspaper Jyllands-Posten.

On 12 May 2010, the main title of the weekly edition of the Weltwoche was: "Must Islam be Banned?" ("Muss der Islam verboten werden?"), the article stating that Muslim religion is incompatible with the Swiss constitution. The front cover of the Weltwoche of 5 April 2012 published a photograph of a Roma child pointing a gun at a camera under the headline "The Roma are coming". The controversy sparked by this choice of illustration was reported internationally. The Swiss Press Council reprimanded Weltwoche for the photograph (the photo itself was from Gjakova, Kosovo) as suggesting a crime being committed by the child and for the headline, stating that it "contributes in a discriminatory manner to stirring up fears and reinforcing stereotypical prejudices against an ethnic group."

On 26 June 2012, Die Weltwoche published an article which lamented the spread of the Irish gene pool and falsely claimed that the Irish Government requires pre-marital DNA testing in an effort to halt supposed widespread incest amongst the Irish who, it was further claimed, have rat-like anatomic features. The article was translated into English and caused controversy in the Irish media.

In April 2025, Swiss newspaper Tages-Anzeiger described Weltwoche as "one of the most brazen propaganda papers in favour of the Russian dictator". Previously, the Weltwoche had published an article entitled "What really happened in Bucha? On Facts and the Contradictions of the West", in which an employee of the Russian state-controlled outlet Russia Today spread conspiracy theories about the Bucha massacre, describing them, among other things, as "staged" by the Ukrainians and claiming that no independent body had investigated the incidents so far. The article had previously appeared on RT and was reproduced verbatim on Weltwoche.de, although it is prohibited in the EU to distribute content from Russia Today. Later, the post was deleted, for formal reasons, as the editors announced.

== Circulation ==
In 1940, its circulation reached 100,000 copies. In 1997, Die Weltwoche had a circulation of 91,142 copies. In 2003, when it started publishing in the magazine format under Köppel, the circulation increased and was around 91,000. Between July 2004 and June 2005 the circulation of the magazine dropped to 80,436 copies after it started supporting the policies of the Swiss People's Party under Köppel. It was 82,849 copies between July 2005 and June 2006 and 85,772 copies between July 2006 and June 2007. Its total circulation in 2006 was also 82,849 copies. It became 85,096 copies between July 2007 and June 2008, dropping to 68,990 in 2012 and 45,519 copies in 2019.
