= Free Russia Forum =

Russian opposition forum

Free Russia Forum Форум свободной России
- Abbreviation: FRF (English); ФСР (Russian)
- Standing Committee: Garry Kasparov; Ivan Tyutrin; Ilya Ponomarev; Marat Gelman; Yevgeniya Chirikova; Leonid Nevzlin; Andrey Illarionov; Daniil Konstantinov
- Founders: Garry Kasparov; Ivan Tyutrin
- Founded: 9 March 2016; 10 years ago
- Banned: 22 February 2019 (in Russia)
- Preceded by: Opposition Coordination Council
- Headquarters: Vilnius, Lithuania
- Membership: 128 (speakers)
- Ideology: Liberal democracy Anti-Putinism
- Political position: Big tent
- Colours: White; Blue; Red

Website
- forumfreerussia.org

The Free Russia Forum (FRF; Russian: Форум свободной России; ФСР, romanized: Forum Svobodnoy Rossii, FSR) is a conference of the Russian opposition, held twice a year in Vilnius (Lithuania). The forum was founded in March 2016 by Garry Kasparov and Ivan Tyutrin, the former executive director of the Russian democratic movement Solidarnost.

The Forum described its goal as forming an intellectual alternative to the current political regime in Russia. According to the organizers, "anyone who shares the values of democracy and considers Russia an integral part of the civilized international community can become a participant, sponsor, and organizer of the Forum". According to Ivan Tyutrin, "the only factor hindering participation is the position of the "Crimeanashist", that is, a supporter of aggression against Ukraine. Therefore, the participation of such figures as Maria Baronova, Vyacheslav Maltsev, and Sergei Udaltsov is impossible in the forum.

As of February 2021, 11 conferences (forums) had been held since March 2016. The ninth forum was held on November 20–21, 2020. Due to the coronavirus pandemic and closed borders, the event was held live on YouTube.

FSR projects include "Personnel Reserve" (training leaders for democratic change), "Putin's List" (dossiers on the leaders of the current regime and the continuation of the policy of sanctions against the Putin regime), and Monitoring the persecution of religious minorities.

A feature of the Free Russia Forum is a wide ideological spectrum of participants. These are non-systemic liberals, national democrats, social democrats, and libertarians. The forum is attended by representatives of various political organizations and associations: PARNAS, Open Russia, Russia of the Future, the Solidarnost movement, the Yabloko party, the Civic Initiative, and the headquarters of Alexei Navalny.

== Forum format and participants ==
The forum takes place over two days. Discussion panels discuss such topics as countering Russian propaganda in Russia and abroad, prospects for international pressure on the Putin regime through sanctions, the economic situation, relations between Russia and the West, and the strategy of the Russian opposition under the current regime in the country.

To become a member of the forum, you must provide at registration two recommendations from politicians, opposition activists, journalists, or human rights defenders.

Over the years, Garry Kasparov, Oleg Sentsov, Sergei Guriev, Arkady Babchenko, Gennady Gudkov, Marat Gelman, Evgeny Chichvarkin, Ilya Ponomarev, Olga Romanova, Alfred Koch, Leonid Nevzlin, Masha Gessen, Alexander Goldfarb, Yevgeny Kiselyov, Leonid Gozman, Roman Dobrokhotov, Andrey Illarionov, Vladislav Inozemtsev, Alexey (Professor) Lebedinsky, Mark Feygin, Andrei Soldatov, Artemy Troitsky, Maria Alyokhina, Alexander Morozov, Ayder Muzhdabaev, Valentyn Nalyvaichenko, Vygaudas Ušackas, Andrey Piontkovsky, Andrius Kubilius, Igor Chubais, Lev Ponomaryov, Mikhail Krutikhin, Boris Reitschuster, Yevgeniya Chirikova, Bozhena Rynska, Mikhail Svetov, David Satter, Tomas Venclova, Alexander Kynev, Elena Fanailova, Lilia Shevtsova, Konstantin Eggert (journalist), Andrei Sannikov, Arkady Yankovsky, Igor Eidman, Elena Lukyanova, Igor Yakovenko, Sergey Gulyaev have taken part in the forum.

=== 7th Forum ===
The seventh forum was held on June 8–9, 2019 in the city of Trakai, 26 kilometers from Vilnius. It was attended by representatives of 60 regions of Russia. As of the end of May, a record number of participants signed up for the Forum – 442 (the majority are residents of Russia), which indicates the rise of the opposition movement.

Before the start of the program, a statement was read out by the FSR regarding the detention of Meduza's special correspondent Ivan Golunov.

The main topics of the 7th Forum:

- Changing public attitudes in Russia
- Ukraine after the presidential elections and the prospects for Russia-Ukraine relations
- Russophilia or Russophobia?
- Information terrorism of Putin's TV and its victims
- New forms of civic activism in Russia
- Power and society: the boundaries of acceptable cooperation
- Belarus and security problems in Eastern Europe
- Is there a "right-wing" in Russian politics?
- Russia's future: disintegration or preservation of a single state

Members of the Tatar government in exile asked the Free Russia Forum to recognize the independence of the Idel-Ural republics. In response, the editorial committee of the Forum published a commentary by Vadim Sidorov, in which he criticized this request due to the lack of the expressed will of the people's concern and the high proportion of the Russian population in these territories. Sidorov suggested discussing this issue during the formation of a renewed federation or other commonwealth of new states on the site of the current Russian Federation.

By a universal vote of the participants of the 7th Forum, it was decided to expand the number of persons on "Putin's List" by 28 persons.

Applications were accepted in support of the detained journalist Ivan Golunov, and in support of the activists of Open Russia, against whom criminal cases were initiated.

Forum participants unanimously supported the resolution in support of the Toronto community's initiative to name a street in Earl Bales Park in honor of Boris Nemtsov.

=== 8th Forum ===
On November 9–10, 2019, the 8th Free Russia Forum was held in Vilnius. More than three hundred people gathered for it, out of 68% came from Russia and 32% represented Russian political emigration. The discussions were attended by Garry Kasparov, Oleg Sentsov, Lev Ponomaryov, Marat Gelman, and others.

The key topics of the 8th Forum include change and development of the repressive apparatus and ways to resist repressions, possible strategies of the Russian opposition concerning participation in elections, past elections to the Moscow City Duma, environmental protests in the regions, the socio-economic situation in Russia, prospects for the development of Russian-Ukrainian conflict in Donbas, prospects and threats to the integration of Russia and Belarus.

At the beginning, the forum paid tribute to the memory of the recently deceased opposition leader Vladimir Bukovsky. Then activists and politicians from the regions spoke about their activities and prospects.

In honor of the 30th anniversary of the fall of the Berlin Wall, participants discussed the reasons for the collapse of the communist regimes.

Several people were included in the "Putin's list", in particular, the judges who passed the verdict on the defendants in the "Moscow case" and the investigators.

Journalist Dmitry Zapolsky presented his book "Putinburg". In it, the author shows how the management system that exists in Russia was created in St. Petersburg.

The next, 9th forum was held in May 2020 in Vilnius.

=== 9th Forum ===
The event was planned in a full-time format with a venue in Vilnius, however, due to the Coronavirus Pandemic, it was held online. It was held on November 20–21, 2020. It was attended by Sergei Guriev, Garry Kasparov, Leonid Gozman, Mikhail Krutikhin, Elena Lukyanova, Gennady Gudkov, Olga Romanova, Andrei Soldatov, Alexander Kynev, Andrey Piontkovsky, Leonid Nevzlin, Lev Ponomaryov, Andrey Illarionov, Konstantin Eggert, Ilya Ponomarev, Vladislav Inozemtsev, Boris Reitschuster, Alexander Morozov, Andrei Sannikov, Marat Gelman, Igor Yakovenko, Yevgeniya Chirikova, Irina Borogan and others.

=== 10th Forum ===
The 10th Forum was held online on May 28–29, 2021.

=== 11th Forum ===
The 11th Forum was held on December 2–3, 2021 in Vilnius, Lithuania.

== Forum Standing Committee ==
In 2018, the Standing Committee of the Free Russia Forum was created. It included Vladimir Ashurkov, Marat Gelman, Andrey Illarionov, Garry Kasparov, Daniil Konstantinov, Leonid Nevzlin, Ilya Ponomarev, Andrei Sidelnikov, Ivan Tyutrin, Mark Feygin and Yevgeniya Chirikova.

In March 2019, the Standing Committee of the Free Russia Forum turned to German Federal Chancellor Angela Merkel with a request to prevent the implementation of the Nord Stream 2 project. "With Nord Stream 2, Russian gas supplies to the EU will be dangerously dependent on bilateral relations between Moscow and Berlin," the open letter says.

The Standing Committee accepts statements on current policy issues. So, in 2019, the Committee announced the recognition of Juan Guaidó as the legitimate interim President of Venezuela, congratulated the people and the new President of Ukraine Volodymyr Zelenskyy on successful elections (Vladimir Putin did not send congratulations). The Standing Committee also condemned the dispersal of several different protest rallies, including May Day demonstrations in several cities of Russia, protesters in Yekaterinburg (against the construction of a church) and Arkhangelsk Oblast (against the construction of a landfill), and a rally in support of independent opposition candidates in the elections to the Moscow City Duma. Additionally, the Standing Committee of the Forum denounced sentences given to participants in the so-called "Moscow case", calling them unjust and dictated by the desire of the Kremlin regime to destroy any centers of resistance to the electoral dictatorship of Vladimir Putin in Russia.

== Putin's List ==
In December 2017, the forum participants compiled the "Putin's List". At the moment, the document contains more than three hundred names, divided into 12 categories. It, according to the creators, is intended to become the basis for the introduction of personal sanctions against the defendants by Western countries. Among the defendants on the List are Russian officials, prominent businessmen, journalists of state and media close to the Kremlin, who, according to the authors, are responsible for the usurpation of power, violation of human rights, corruption, military aggression, and hate propaganda.

In 2018, members of the Forum's Standing Committee Mark Feygin and Ivan Tyutrin traveled to Washington, D.C. to present the List to the responsible US agencies.

In April 2019, it was announced that the "Putin's List" database was opened on a special website www.spisok-putina.org. Here are detailed dossiers with biographies and a description of the actions of the defendants that led to their inclusion in the database. In April 2020, the site was blocked by Roskomnadzor.

The dossiers in the database are divided into the following categories (some persons are listed in several categories):

- accomplices
- aggressors
- beneficiaries
- executors
- oligarchs and corrupt officials
- owners
- propagandists
- «right-destroyers»

The database is regularly updated with new dossiers, which is reported in the site's news. As of 30/12/2019, according to the counter in the upper left corner of the site, the database contained information on 375 persons involved.

Additions to the Putin List are accepted by open voting by participants in the in-person forums In December 2018, at the 6th FSR, 93 new persons were included in the List, and in June 2019 at the 7th forum, the List was replenished with 28 persons.

At the 7th FSR, Oleg Kashin was included in Putin's List. The grounds are his complicity in the propaganda of the Putin regime, the use of the status of an authoritative and popular publicist to legitimize the aggressive neo-imperial policy of the Russian leadership. During the discussion of Kashin's candidacy, the opinions of the forum participants were divided, but the majority of participants supported the inclusion. The members of the FSR Standing Committee Leonid Nevzlin and Mark Feygin spoke in favor of the introduction. Marat Gelman actively opposed the introduction.

57 persons were added to Putin's List at the 8th Forum. Among the new defendants: TV presenter Tigran Keosayan, designer Artemy Lebedev, as well as judges and investigators in the Moscow case.

In December 2019, representatives of the Free Russia Forum Andrey Illarionov, Ilya Ponomarev and Ivan Tyutrin presented the updated Putin List to the US Congress and several other American departments. As one of the delegation members, Ivan Tyutrin, said, special attention was paid to the "Moscow case" in the updated report. Forum representatives plan to convey information about the next political process in Russia, naming by name the people responsible for the violent dispersal of peaceful demonstrations and fabrication of criminal cases against civil activists.

== Deportation of the VGTRK film crew from Lithuania ==
The first Free Russia Forum, held in March 2016, was accompanied by a scandal. In one of the hotels in Vilnius, a fight broke out with the participation of Bozena Rynska and employees of the state TV channel Russia 24, after which all members of the TV crew were deported from Lithuania with the wording "a possible threat to national security". The deported journalists were also banned from entering the country.

The situation with the expulsion was reacted at the Russian Ministry of Foreign Affairs. The official representative of the department, Maria Zakharova, commented on the situation as follows: "Once again, we are forced to state that the Lithuanian authorities continue their policy of introducing total censorship in the country and eradicating any dissent."

The journalists challenged the deportation decision at the European Court of Human Rights, accusing the Lithuanian authorities of violating freedom of speech. The ECHR adopted a decision by a majority of votes, according to which the complaints of the employees of the Russia-24 TV channel were declared inadmissible, and the arguments of the Lithuanian authorities – well-founded. The ECtHR stressed that the guarantees of freedom of expression apply to journalists if they act in good faith to disseminate information that is relevant to the facts, based on the principles of responsible journalism. In this case, the ECtHR did not recognize the applicants' behavior as such.

== Legal action ==
On December 2, 2019, the Vilnius Regional Court satisfied the claim of the Ukrainian journalist and blogger Anatoly Shariy against the Forum of Free Russia due to the publication of slander against him. He should be paid 3,000 euros and 1,200 euros of court fees. However, this decision was reversed on appeal in 2021.

== Russia government reaction ==
On February 22, 2019, Roskomnadzor blocked the Forum website forumfreerussia.org on the territory of the Russian Federation. The decision to block it was made by the Tagansky Court of Moscow. Article 15.1 of the Law on Information – "Dissemination of prohibited information" is indicated as the basis.

On February 1, 2023, the Russian Prosecutor General's Office has designated the Free Russia Forum as an "undesirable" organization. "Undesirable organizations" are banned from operating on Russian territory under threat of felony prosecution.

In 2025, the Free Russia Forum was declared a terrorist organization.
