= Aleksandr Skobov =

Russian activist and Soviet dissident

- Александр Скобов
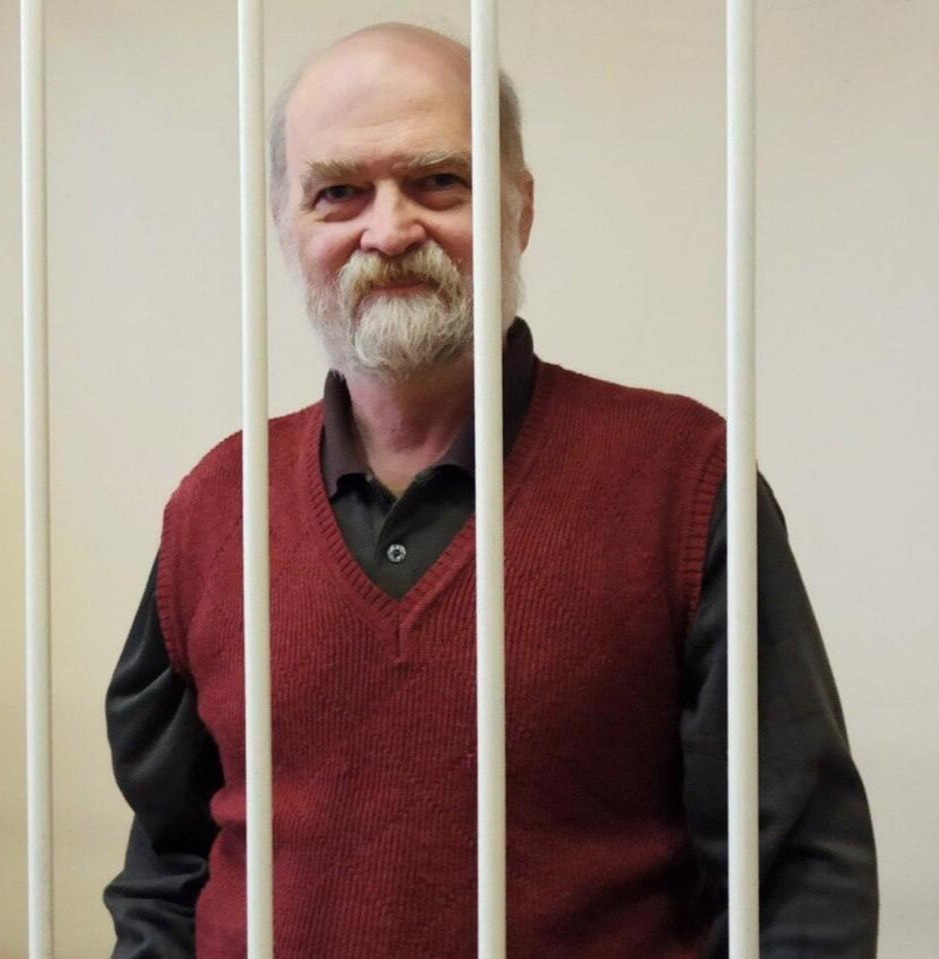
- Skobov detained in 2025
- Born: 4 November 1957 (age 69); Leningrad, Russian SFSR, Soviet Union
- Education: Leningrad State University

Aleksandr Skobov (Russian: Александр Валерьевич Скобов; born 4 November 1957) is a Russian historian, activist and Soviet dissident.

Skobov has been convicted and subjected to punitive psychiatry for ″anti-Soviet propaganda″ twice, one time in 1976 and the other in 1982. He was arrested in April 2024 and sent to a pre-trial detention center, charged with "justifying terrorism" and ″participation in a terrorist community″ after he had been openly opposing Russian military action against Ukraine since 2014.

In March 2025, he was sentenced to 16 years in prison in Russia for a social media post supporting Ukraine and his alleged involvement with the opposition group Free Russia Forum.

== Biography ==
=== Early activism and convictions ===
Skobov was born in 1957 in Leningrad, then in the Russian Soviet Federative Socialist Republic. He took part in his first anti-government protest at age 19, when he and members of an underground organization he was part of threw flyers calling for ″humanistic socialism″ from the roof of a building downtown on the eve of the 25th Congress of the Communist Party of the Soviet Union in 1976. As a result, several of them were kicked out of their universities, but Skobov, who was a first-year history student at Leningrad State University at the time, was sent to a disciplinary meeting with the Komsomol youth group. Later in October 1976, he was arrested for publishing an anti-government magazine called Perspectives, after half a year spent in a KGB prison, he was sentenced to forced psychiatric treatment where he spent three years in confinement.

In 1981 following his release, he joined the dissident group Free Interprofessional Association of Workers, which led the first attempt to create an independent trade union in the Soviet Union. In 1982, he was once again sentenced to psychiatric treatment, this time for writing a samizdat article where he defended Chile's former socialist president, Salvador Allende, who had died in unclear circumstances in 1973, and criticized the dictator Augusto Pinochet. The article was deemed "anti-Soviet propaganda." He spent five years in the hospital, being released during the summer in 1987, the initial phase of Soviet leader Mikhail Gorbachev's liberalization campaign.

=== Opposition to the Russian invasion of Ukraine ===
When Russia annexed Crimea in 2014, Skobov openly supported Ukraine and condemned Russia's military action on social media. The same year, he was attacked by two unidentified men armed with knives outside his home, which his friends and family believe was retribution for his criticism of the regime He condemned the Russian invasion of Ukraine in 2022.

In early April 2024, he was arrested and charged with "justifying terrorism" after making a social-media post about Ukrainian attacks damaging the Crimean Bridge that links Russia with the occupied Ukrainian Crimea region. Two days prior to being detained, he had given an interview to Okno where he called for the support of Russian volunteer groups fighting along with Ukraine's military against Russian troops that have invaded Ukraine. He was sent to a pre-trial detention center, and in protest to his arrest, he refused to take his medication and glasses with him. He was also later charged with participation in a ″terrorist community″, and was transferred from Saint Petersburg to Syktyvkar.

In July 2024, Novaya Gazeta published a letter Skobov had sent to his wife, it was published with an introduction written by opposition politician Leonid Gozman, who described Skobov as ″not simply a hero but a Saint in the direct Biblical sense″ and his letter as ″a fantastic document″. Gozman described the letter as Skobov avoiding pathos and thinking about his influence on others, but wanting ″today's young people who bear the brunt of the regime's repression know that the Soviet dissidents are standing alongside them.″

In March 2025, Skobov was sentenced to 16 years in prison for his social media post supporting a 2022 Ukrainian strike on the Crimean Bridge, and his alleged involvement with the opposition group Free Russia Forum. Observers, including associate director for the Human Rights Watch's Europe and Central Asia division, Tanya Lokshina, who described the sentence as ″draconian″, said that the case highlighted that the repression in Russia now exceeds parts of the Soviet period. In his final statement before sentencing, Skobov again condemned the war in Ukraine and the Putin regime.

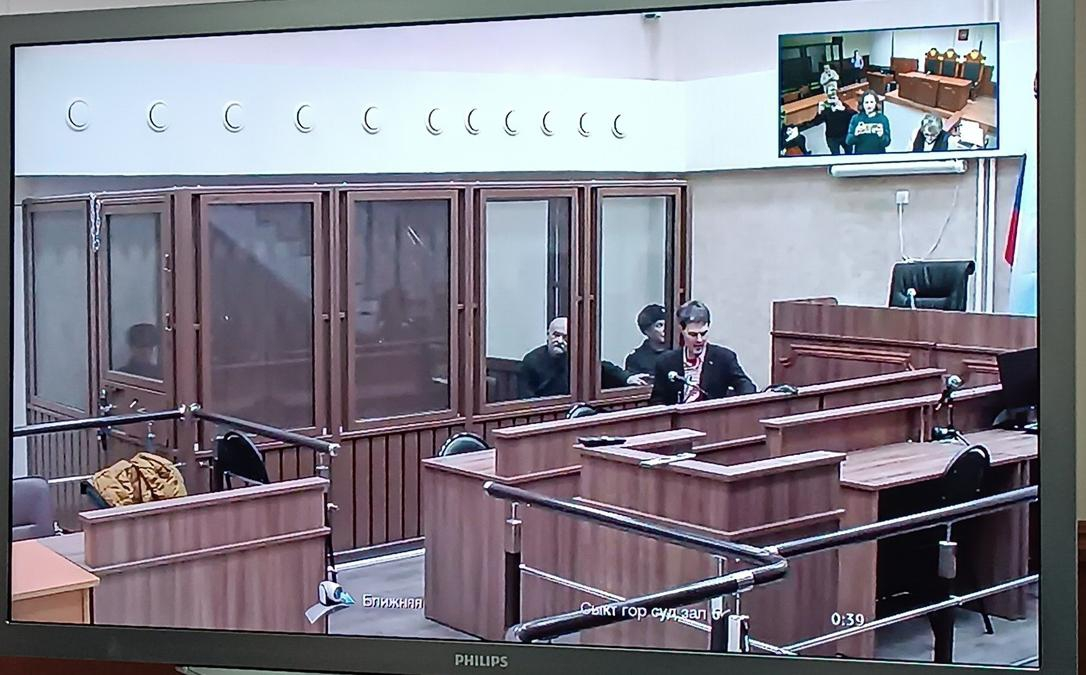
Alexander Skobov on trial before giving the "I accuse Putin’s corpse-stinking clique" speech

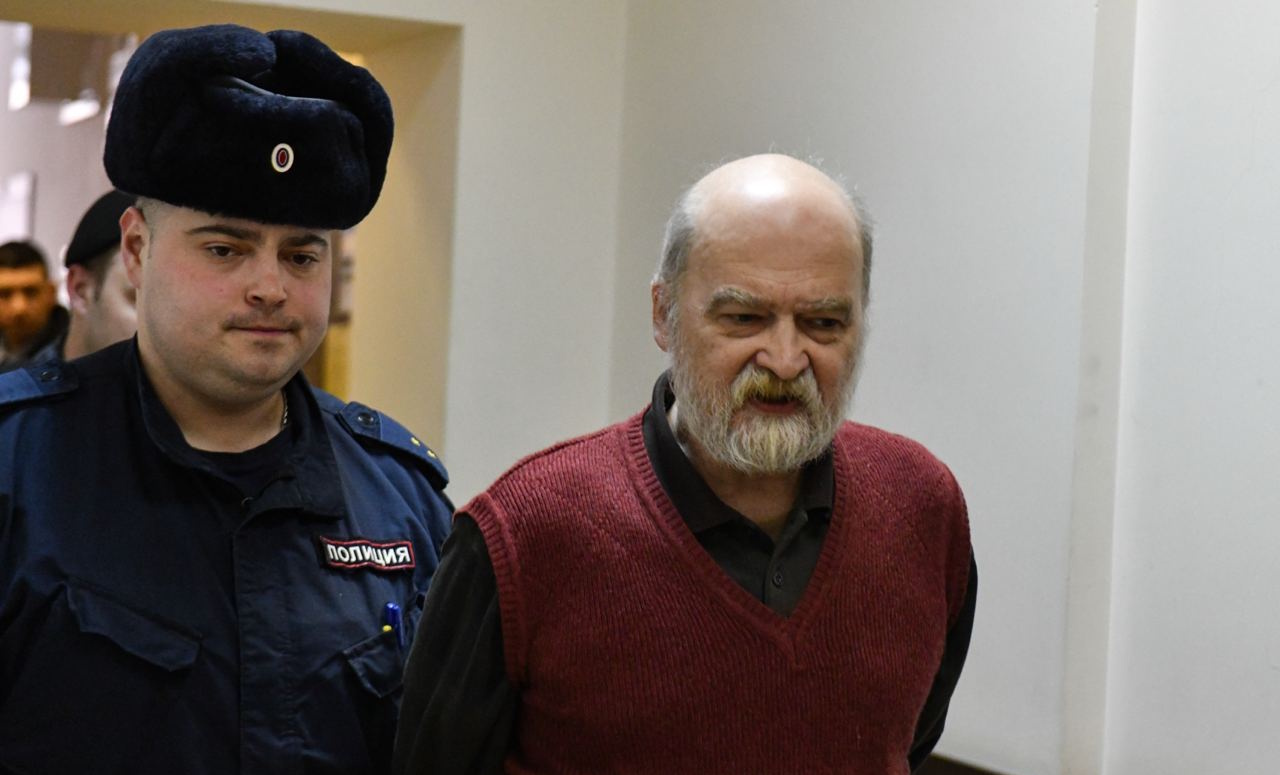
Alexander Skobov shouting "Glory to Ukraine, Death to fascist Invaders"

Skobov's closing statement in the trial in full:

"I will not dwell on the fact that the investigation has branded the organisation I have the honour of belonging to, the Free Russia Forum, as a terrorist community. There has been no official ruling from any government body recognising the Free Russia Forum as such. For now, it is merely an “undesirable organization.”

But I have little interest in all this petty mumbling. I prefer to speak about what truly matters. What matters here is the platform of the Free Russia Forum, a platform I was directly involved in shaping, and one that distinguishes the Free Russia Forum from most other opposition organisations.

Let me remind you that this platform is built on three principles. First: we stand for the unconditional return to Ukraine of all its internationally recognised territories occupied by Russia, including Crimea. Yes, Крим це Україна.

Second. We support all those who are fighting to achieve these goals—including citizens of the Russian Federation who have voluntarily joined the Armed Forces of Ukraine.

And third. We recognise any form of war against Putin’s tyranny inside Russia, including armed resistance. Of course, we are deeply disgusted by the methods of ISIS, when innocent people are targeted, as was the case in Crocus City.

But are the Kremlin’s war propagandists a legitimate target? The Free Russia Forum has not formally debated this issue or adopted any resolutions on it, so what I say next reflects my personal position alone.

I believe that propagandists such as TV host Vladimir Solovyov deserve the same fate as Hitler’s chief propagandist Julius Streicher, who was hanged by the Nuremberg Tribunal. Until these outcasts of the human race are brought before a new Nuremberg Tribunal—and as long as this war continues—they remain legitimate military targets.

For me, the comparison between Putin’s and Hitler’s propagandists is not mere rhetoric. Much of my public writings has been devoted to proving the inherently Nazi nature of Putin’s regime—a regime with which peaceful coexistence is fundamentally impossible.

I appeal now, as I have before, first and foremost to Europe, which should remember the origins of the current European system. Since 1945, Europe has been building a world in which predators no longer prevailed, a world based on the principles of law, justice, freedom, and humanity. Europe had achieved much on this path and seemed to have rid itself of massacres and territorial redistributions forever.

Europe once believed that this safe and prosperous world was securely protected by a great powerful ally across the ocean. Today, this world is being torn to splinters by two scoundrels on both sides: the Kremlin and Washington. People with pro-fascist values have come to power in the United States.

We are witnessing a disgusting attempt at a purely imperialist collusion between two predators. An even more despicable collusion than the Munich Betrayal of 1938. If Putin’s annexations are legalised, it will spell disaster for civilization. Europe, you have been betrayed. Wake up and go fight for your world!

Death to the Russian fascist invaders! Death to Putin, the new Hitler, murderer and scoundrel! Glory to Ukraine! Glory to the heroes!

I usually end my speeches with these words. But today I will be further asked whether I plead guilty.

Well, I am the accuser here.

I accuse Putin’s corpse-stinking clique of planning, unleashing, and waging an aggressive war. Of committing war crimes in Ukraine. Of orchestrating political terror in Russia. Of corrupting my people.

And now, I ask the servants of Putin’s regime present here, mere cogs in the repressive machine: do you find yourselves guilty of complicity in Putin’s crimes? Do you repent?

And with that, I’ve said all I needed to say.″

In April 2026, Skobov lodged an appeal in order to call on European countries to join the Russo-Ukrainian war and defeat the Russian Federation while in prison. He also used the appeal hearing to tell his wife he was ″doing everything possible to meet the Ecuadorian frog″, referring to the toxin used to murder the imprisoned Alexei Navalny.
