= Kuban Partisan Movement =

Rebel group in Kuban, Russia

Kuban Partisan Movement (KPD)
- Кубанское партизанское движение (КПД)
- Leader: "Yuzhak" (Note: Russian: «Южак», lit. 'Southerner')
- Founded: 16 March 2023
- Country: Kuban
- Active regions: Krasnodar Krai, Stavropol Krai, Rostov-on-Don, Crimea
- Ideology: Anti-Putinism; Kuban separatism National democracy
- Part of: Coalition; United Front of Resistance (formerly)
- Wars: Russian invasion of Ukraine: Russian partisan movement (2022–present)

The Kuban Partisan Movement (KPD) is a regional partisan formation of the Russian armed opposition. Created after the full-scale Russian invasion of Ukraine, it supports Ukraine in the war. The KPD commits arson and sabotage, and conducts agitation. It opposes the rulling Government of Russia, and supports self-determination and the independence of Kuban.

== Creation and principles ==
The KPD was created by anti-Putin activists from the fall of 2022 to the spring of 2023. The impetus for the creation was the full-scale Russian invasion of Ukraine. On December 7, 2023, the "Manifesto of the Kuban Partisan Movement" was published. The authors of the manifesto declared the state of the Russian Federation "criminal and terrorist", sharply condemned the "war against the people close to us", demanded the cessation of hostilities and the withdrawal of Russian troops to the borders of 1991.

Not only the Government under Putin, but also the "corrupt leadership of the Kuban" were sharply condemned by the KPD. Kuban as a historical and geographical region was proclaimed "independent and self-sufficient". A referendum on secession was demanded: "Our goal is a democratic, secure, free, prosperous and independent Kuban."

The composition and number of KPDs are not disclosed. It is known that the founder and leader is a partisan with the call sign "Yuzhak". Initially, the basis of the movement was a group of like-minded friends, over time the contingent expanded. According to Yuzhak, most of the participants in the movement are young people in the humanities.

There are no rigid ideological frameworks in the movement. The participants of the KPD adhere to general democratic views with a national bias and advocate the independence of the Kuban.

Our values are conscience, freedom, and the future. Such personalities as Aleksandr Skobov are inspiring. This is flint. A real example for all of us. (Note: Russian: Наши ценности — совесть, свобода, будущее. Вдохновляют такие личности как Александр Скобов. Это кремень. Настоящий пример для всех нас.)

«Yuzhak»

== Partisan actions ==
KPD representatives took responsibility for the following actions:

- arson of a Krasnodar refinery (13 June 2023)
- arson of Novocherkassk GRES (14 June 2023)
- arson of the terminal in the port of Novorossiysk (18 August 2023)
- arson of a military unit in Kurganinsk (15 November 2023)
- arson of the North Caucasian resource storage base of the Ministry of Internal Affairs in the Rostov region (21 June 2024)
- arson of the building of the Lazarevsky District Court (10 July 2024)
- arson of an administrative building on the territory of the military unit in the village of Molkono (21 September 2024)
- explosion of the car of Vadim Sobieski, the Chief of Staff of the military unit, in Millerovo (14 June 2024)
- disabling of Chernomortransneft Oil Pipeline (12 March 2025)
- assassination attempt on a sailor of the Russian Navy in Krasnodar (27 April 2025)
- assassination of Nikolai Bryantsev, a Russian soldier and alleged participant in the Bucha massacre (May 2025)

KPD publishes a Telegram channel, carries out field reconnaissance and recruits new members, and maintains a register of war criminals. The geography of the actions is Krasnodar Krai, the Stavropol Krai, Rostov-on-Don, and Crimea. According to Igor Yakovenko, the railway sabotage of the KPD was committed in the geographically distant Bryansk.

The KPD is a member of the Coalition, a group of Russian partisan movements, and the United Front of Resistance. It participates in joint partisan actions.

== See also ==
- Atesh
- Stop the Wagons
- Skrepach
