= Skrepach =

- СкрепачЪ
- Founding leader: Skrepach
- Founded: 24 June 2023
- Country: Russia
- Active regions: Russia and Russian-occupied Donetsk Oblast
- Ideology: Anti-Putinism, democracy
- Part of: Coalition; United Front of Resistance
- Wars: Russian invasion of Ukraine: Russian partisan movement (2022–present)

The Russian Partisan Movement "Skrepach" (Note: From the Russian word skripach (Russian: скрипач), literally meaning "violinist") (Russian: Российское партизанское движение «СкрепачЪ»), also abbreviated RPD «Skrepach» (Russian: РПД «СкрепачЪ»), is a Russian partisan formation of the armed opposition created in June 2023. It opposes the ruling regime of the Russian Federation, and supports Ukraine in the war. It is a member of the Coalition and the United Front of Resistance. It commits arson and sabotage, conducts agitation, and trains partisans.

== Creation, principles, composition ==
The impetus for the creation of a partisan group was the full-scale Russian invasion of Ukraine. The Skrepach movement made itself known in June 2023, when the official telegram channel was created. The name was given by the call sign of the founder and leader.

When creating the partisan movement, one of the main ideas was to destroy these damned bonds, to throw them off society. In addition, I graduated from a music school. So it somehow came together. (Note: Russian: При создании партизанского движения, одна из основных идей была — разрушить эти проклятые скрепы, скинуть их с общества. К тому же я заканчивал музыкальную школу. Вот оно как-то так сошлось воедино.)-Skrepach, leader of the movement of the same name

Until the end of 2023, several sabotage actions were carried out, including at military factories. Since 2024, the movement has spread to different regions, up to the Far East.

In the initial period of its activity, the movement used its own financial resources. Then the partisans received stable financial support from sponsors – "representatives of the Russian middle class".

Ideologically, the RPD "Skrepach" adheres to general democratic principles. The priority is the overthrow of the Putin regime, the creation of a free and fair society. "Skrepach" focuses on agitation, propaganda of resistance, training and education of personnel.

The total number of the movement has not been announced. Initially, Skrepach was created by a group of like-minded people. They were joined by specialists in various fields - cybersecurity, explosives, work with UAVs. The age composition is also different: there are former participants in the war, parents seeking revenge for their children who died in combat.

Many people who have joined our movement are those who fought at the front in Putin's army yesterday. This is a big plus for us, because they not only have real experience in armed struggle, but also brought from the front tools for carrying out actions, which we pass on to our trained participants, train new members of the movement. (Note: Russian: Немало людей, присоединившихся к нашему движению — это те, кто ещё вчера воевали на фронте в путинской армии. Это большой плюс для нас, ведь они обладают не только реальным опытом вооруженной борьбы, но и привезли с фронта инструменты для проведения акций, которые мы передаем нашим подготовленным участникам, обучаем новых членов движения)

== Actions ==
RPD "Skrepach" assumes responsibility for the following actions:

- August 30, 2023 – explosion of the building of the Investigative Committee in Bryansk
- October 3, 2023 – arson of warehouses with military uniforms in Rostov-on-Don
- November 28, 2023 – arson of the unified battery command post 9S737 "Ranzhir"
- December 8, 2023 – arson of a gas pipeline in Kerch
- January 13, 2024 – arson of the P-265 command and staff vehicle
- February 6, 2024 – arson of a Z-car (Note: A car owned by a supporter of the Russian invasion of Ukraine, decorated with the Russian military's Z symbol) in Samara
- March 26, 2024 – arson of a relay cabinet in the Bryansk region
- November 24, 2024 – together with the Extremist/Liberator movement – liquidation of Wagner PMC employee Sergei Konkeev in Krasnoyarsk
- January 9, 2025 – arson in Donetsk of the car of a supporter of the war with Ukraine

In January 2025, Skrepach was included in the Unified Federal List of Organizations, including foreign and international organizations, recognized as terrorist in accordance with the legislation of the Russian Federation.

== See also ==
- Atesh
- Stop the Wagons
- Kuban Partisan Movement
