= Ayder Muzhdabaev =

Ukrainian journalist

- Ayder İzzet oğlu Mujdabayev
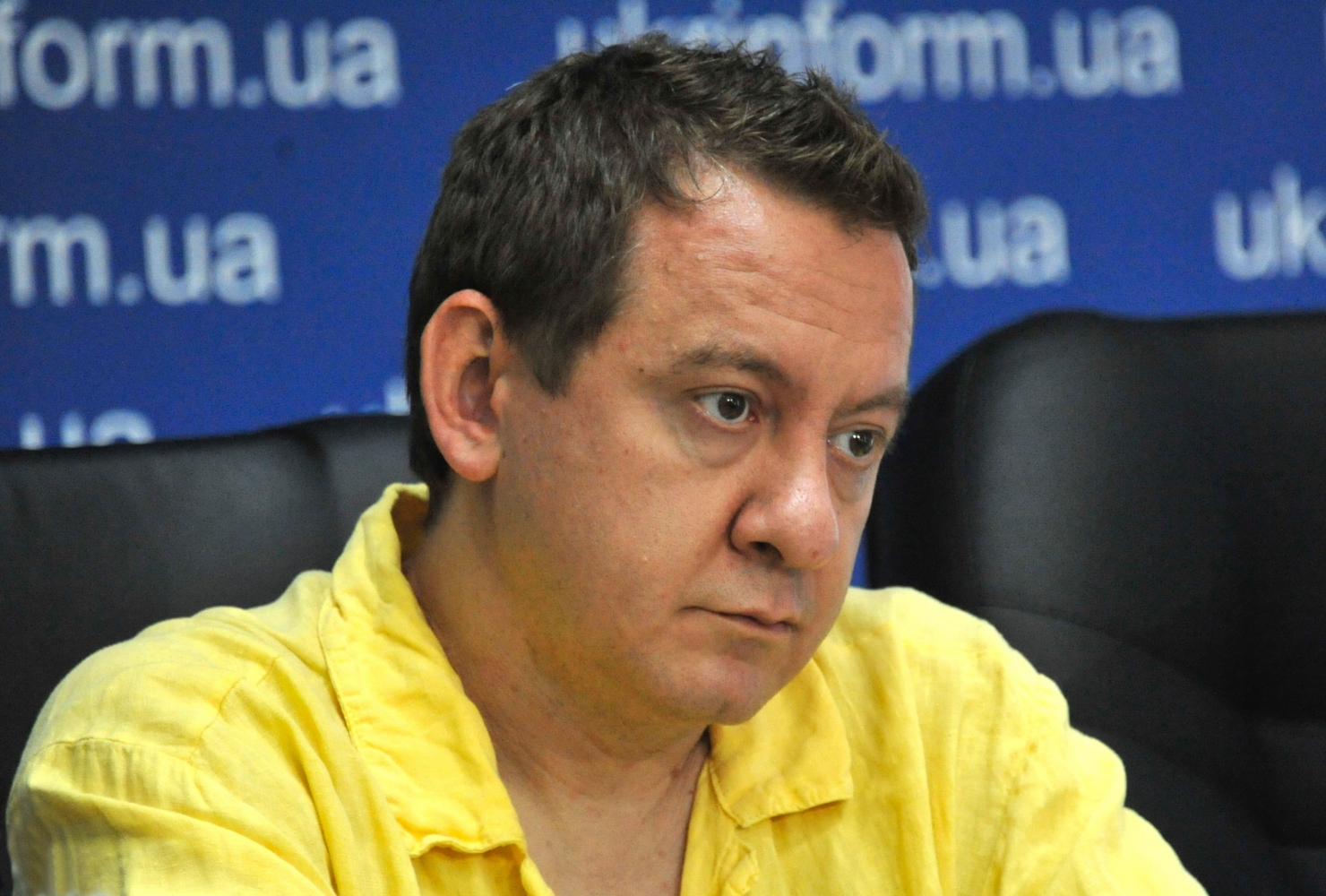
- Muzhdabaev in 2015
- Born: 8 March 1972 (age 54); Tambov, USSR
- Other name: Ukrainian: Айдер Іззетович Муждабаєв
- Education: Tambov State University
- Occupations: Journalist; columnist

Ayder Muzhdabaev (Note: Crimean Tatar: Ayder İzzet oğlu Mujdabayev; Ukrainian: Айдер Іззетович Муждабаєв (Ayder Izzetovych Muzhdabaev; surname also romanized from Ukrainian as Muzhdabayev).) (born 8 March 1972, Tambov, RSFSR) is a Ukrainian Crimean Tatar journalist. He is a regular columnist at Ukrainska Pravda and serves as the deputy director of the ATR television channel. Muzhdabaev is one of the authors of the report Putin. War published after the assassination of Boris Nemtsov and was involved in the Free Russia Forum.

While he was based in Russia, Muzhdabaev served as a correspondent in the politics section of Moskovskij Komsomolets from 1998 to 2015. In 2015 he left his position and moved to Ukraine, due to the Russo-Ukrainian War. Muzhdabaev's support for Ukraine’s territorial integrity, which he routinely expressed on the daily talk show that he cohosted, has led to criminal charges against him in Russia.

In 2023, Muzhdabaev criticized Zianon Pazniak, Litvinists, their claims to Lithuania's history and capital Vilnius and concluded that such Litvinists should be deported from Lithuania with wolf's tickets, while describing the Lithuanians as "our friends".

== Biography ==
Ayder Muzhdabaev was born in Tambov in 1972 to Izzet Muzhdabaev and Tatyana Muzhdabaeva. His paternal ancestors hailed from Karasubazar in Crimea (now Bilohirsk) prior to the deportation of the Crimean Tatars. Family lore holds that they were related to Ismail Gasprinsky.

Muzhdabaev holds Ukrainian citizenship since 2016. Since October 2017 he hosts the "Prime: Muzhdabaev" program on the ATR television channel.

During the 2019 presidential elections in Ukraine, he supported Petro Poroshenko and spoke out against Volodymyr Zelenskyy believing his policies (and his voters) to be dangerously pro-Russian: "so there should be a new revolution for the sake of patriot's victory even if it means losing six or eight regions."
