= Kira Yarmysh =

Alexei Navalny's spokeswoman and writer (born 1989)

- Кира Ярмыш
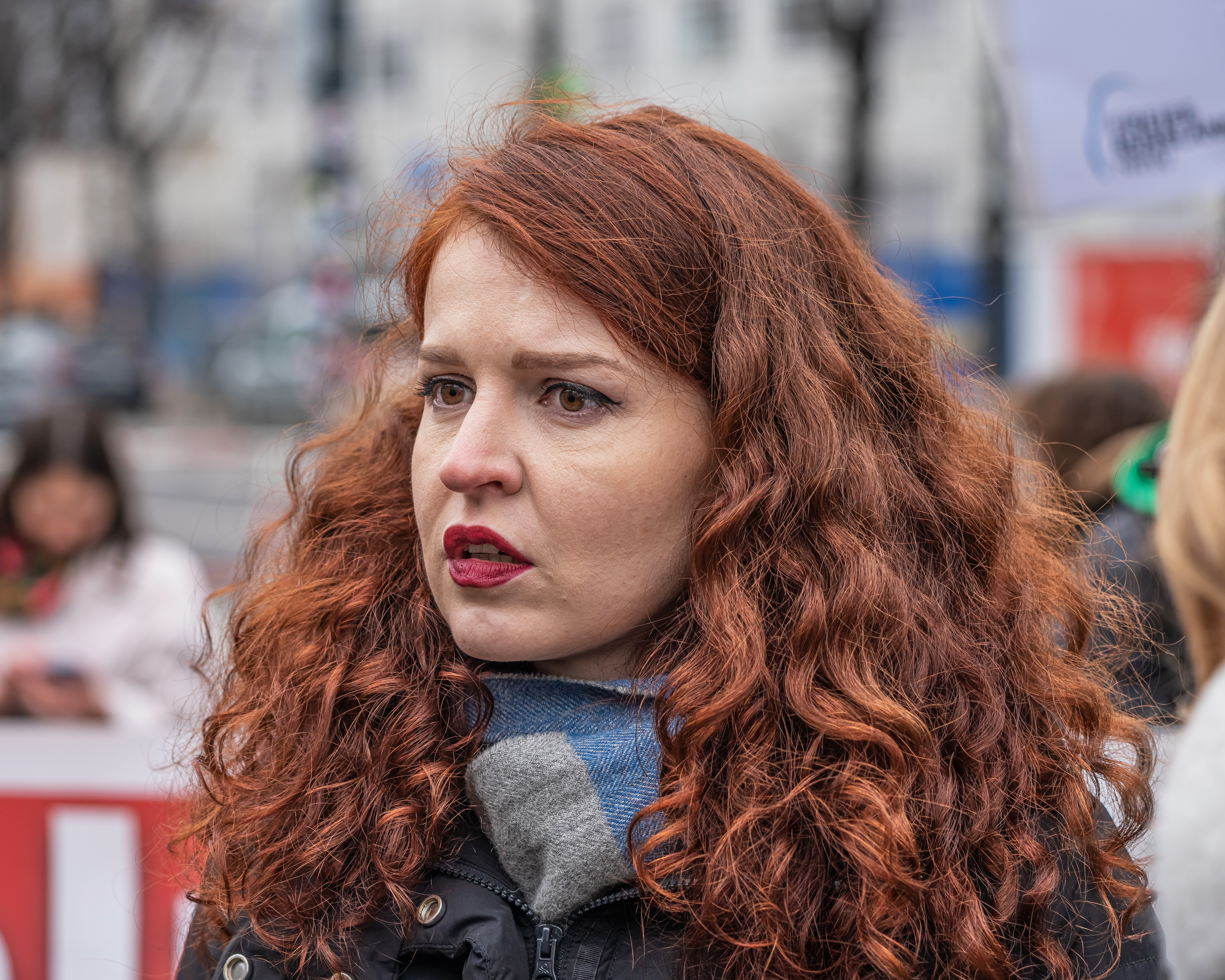
- Yarmysh in 2023
- Born: Kira Aleksandrovna Yarmysh; October 11, 1989 (age 36); Rostov-on-Don, Soviet Union
- Education: Moscow State Institute of International Relations
- Occupations: Spokesperson, assistant, writer, activist
- Employer(s): Alexei Navalny, Anti-Corruption Foundation

Kira Aleksandrovna Yarmysh (Russian: Кира Александровна Ярмыш, IPA: [ˈkʲirə ˈjarmɨʂ]; born October 11, 1989) is a Russian public figure and writer. She is the former press secretary and assistant of the late Russian opposition leader Alexei Navalny and the author of the 2020 novel Incredible Incidents in Women's Cell No. 3. (Note: Also known as The Curious Events in Women’s Cell #3. Russian: Невероятные происшествия в женской камере № 3)

== Biography ==
Kira Yarmysh was born in Rostov-on-Don on October 11, 1989 into a Jewish family. In 2007, she entered the Faculty of International Journalism of Moscow State Institute of International Relations (MGIMO) without exams, having won the University Challenge Olympiad. After graduating, she worked in the press services of the Pushkin Museum in Moscow and Utair airline. In 2013, she took part in the election campaign of Alexei Navalny, who ran for mayor of Moscow. In August 2014, she became the press secretary of Navalny and the press secretary of the Anti-Corruption Foundation (FBK). Navalny wrote in this regard: "It was important for us that the press sec had a strange surname."

In 2017, Yarmysh was co-host of several editions of the Navalny 20:18 programme, and made anti-corruption statements on her behalf. In particular, she published a video in which she said that Putin's friend Mikhail Kovalchuk "owns all television"; later Yarmysh acknowledged factual errors in the video and deleted it.

In February 2018, Yarmysh was arrested for 5 days for a retweet that "formed a negative opinion of another candidate" in the Russian presidential elections; in May of the same year, a court of Moscow ordered a 25-day administrative arrest for tweets made two days before Vladimir Putin's inauguration about the action "He's Not our Tsar".

On January 21, 2021, for calling for rallies in support of Alexei Navalny, she was detained by Russian authorities along with her associates Lyubov Sobol and Georgy Alburov. She was jailed for 9 days on charges of organizing public events without notifying the authorities. On February 1, 2021, Kira was placed under house arrest. The human rights organisation Memorial recognized her as a political prisoner. Yarmysh fled Russia in 2021 after being convicted for calling for protests against Navalny's arrest.

== Literary activity ==
On October 26, 2020, the Corpus publishing house published a novel by Kira Yarmysh titled "Incredible Incidents in Women's Cell No. 3" (Russian: Невероятные происшествия в женской камере № 3). The main heroine of the book is the girl Anya, who ended up in a special detention center for participating in an anti-corruption rally. The novel is based on the author's personal experience; Alexei Navalny said that he was the one who convinced Yarmysh to write the book.

Russian writer Dmitry Bykov called "Incredible Incidents ..." "a funny and fascinating prison novel", the author of which spoke "about the most important and painful thing — about the very new Russia that managed to be born, grow up and take place in spite of everything." According to Russian writer Boris Akunin, this is "a very timely book", the text of which is "much more alive than that of Gorky." Literary critic Galina Yuzefovich called the novel "very personal, deeply universal, very fascinating and truly relevant," characterizing at the metaphorical level the nature of the relationship between man and state machine in Putin's Russia.

== Personal life ==
Yarmysh married in 2015 but later divorced. She was in a relationship with Ruslan Shaveddinov, FBK's project manager.

== Bibliography ==
- Yarmysh, Kira (February 7, 2023). The Incredible Events in Women's Cell Number 3. Grove Press. ISBN 978-0-8021-6073-7.
- Yarmysh, Kira (April 22, 2022). Харассмент [Harassment] (in Russian). Corpus. ISBN 978-5-17-148569-6.
- Yarmysh, Kira (September 2025). Тут недалеко [Not Far from Here] (in Russian). Meduza. ISBN 978-9934-9255-7-3.

== See also ==
- 2017–2018 Russian protests
- 2019 Moscow protests
