= Selve (company) =

Former Swiss metalworks in Thun

- Formerly: Schweizerische Metallwerke Selve & Co.
- Industry: Metalworking
- Founded: 1895
- Founder: Gustav Selve
- Fate: Production ceased (1993)
- Headquarters: Thun, Switzerland

Selve was a Swiss metalworks in Thun. It was founded in 1895 as the Schweizerische Metallwerke Selve & Co. by the Westphalian industrialist Gustav Selve and remained in his family until 1979, when the heirs sold it to the financier Werner K. Rey. Production ceased in 1993.

== History ==
In 1895 Gustav Selve opened the Schweizerische Metallwerke Selve & Co. in the former power station in Thun, in order to expand his existing business relations with the Federal Military Department and the Federal Telegraph Directorate (Obertelegrafendirektion). After his death in 1909, his widow Maria and his son Walther took over the works. From 1911 to 1932 they were run by Emil Messner, under whose management they became the largest employer in the region during World War I and later an exporting company.

In the early 1920s the Selve family settled in Thun. In 1933 Walther's wife Else, who, like Gustav before her, worked for the welfare of the workers, became the sole owner of the business. In 1979 the heirs sold the works to Werner K. Rey, and in 1993 production ceased. At the beginning of the 21st century the Selve site was converted into a district of residential and office buildings.

== Bibliography ==
- W. von Selve, Von Selve, 1941
- W. Juker, Bernische Wirtschaftsgeschichte, 1949, 315–321
- Thuner Tagblatt, 30 May 1995

This article incorporates text from a free content work. Licensed under CC-BY SA. Text taken from Selve, Anna Bähler Lüthi, Historical Dictionary of Switzerland.
