= Vladislav Inozemtsev =

Russian academician (born 1968)

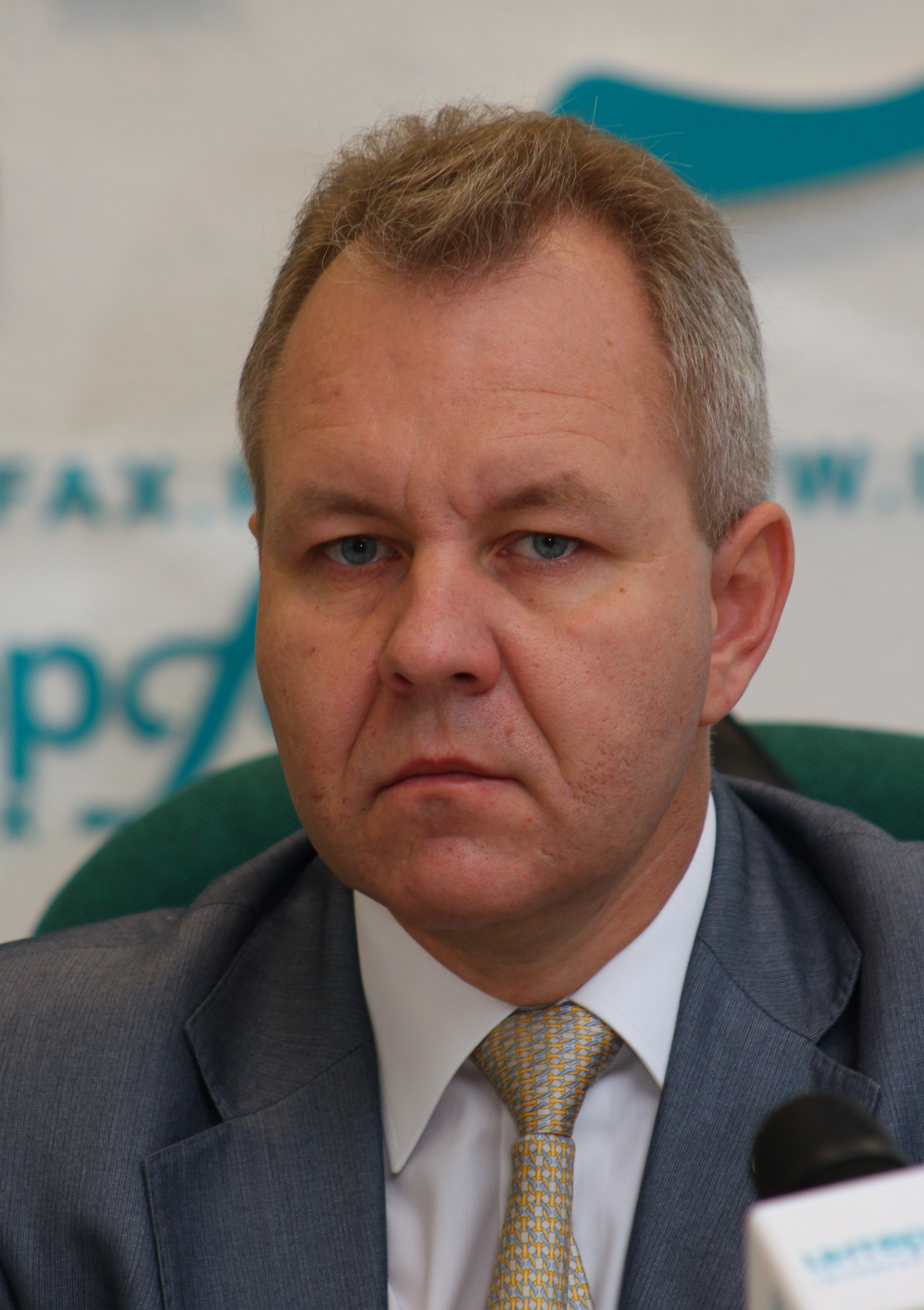
Inozemtsev in 2011

Vladislav Leonidovich Inozemtsev (Russian: Владислав Леонидович Иноземцев; born 10 October 1968) is a Russian academician who is the director of the Moscow-based Centre for Research on Post-Industrial Societies, a nonprofit think tank. He is a professor and the chair at the Department of World Economy, Faculty of Public Governance, Moscow State Lomonosov University. Inozemtsev is also Russian Media Studies Project Special Advisor at the Washington-based Middle East Media Research Institute

== Career ==
From 1992-1993 he was a specialist, then chief specialist of the joint-stock company "Interbank Financial House" (Moscow) (Russian: АО «Межбанковский финансовый дом» (Москва)), and, in 1993 he was deputy manager of the branch of the commercial bank "Credit-Moscow" (Russian: банк «Кредит-Москва») which was supported by bank Imperial. From 1993 he was Vice President, from 1995 First Deputy Chairman of the Management Board, from 1999 to 2003 Chairman of the Management Board of the Moscow-Paris Bank (Moscow) (Russian: «Московско-Парижский банк» (Москва)).

Since November 2012, Inozemtsev has been chairman of the High Council of the Civilian Force, a Russian "center-liberal", pro-European political party. He authored Mikhail Prokhorov's presidential program, when the candidate ran third to Putin in the March 2012 elections.

He has been published in Foreign Affairs with Alexander Lebedev and with Ivan Krastev and in Russia in Global Affairs with Ilya Ponomarev, with Vladimir Ryzhkov and with Yekaterina Kuznetsova. His articles have also been published in M.NEWS.

Signature

In spring 2018 he concluded that the new Cold War between Russia and the West was based on the complete absence of rationality within Russian foreign policy. He could not see where Putin was aiming, except to become a dictator in a land that doesn't even try to keep up appearances of being a democracy. Trying to re-erect the Soviet Union wouldn't seem promising.

In 2021, Inozemtsev concluded that Putin became even more anti-western. The reason for this were personal incompatibilities with his western counterparts; Putin was "neither politician nor a military person″ but a spy instead, believing not in institutions and hierarchies, but in loyalty, trust and networks: "Putin believed that the world is being reigned by people instead of institutions".

In spring 2022 Inozemtsev claimed that Putin fulfilled "immaculately the catalog of what matters to be called fascism" according to the following four pillars:

1. Irredentism and militarization
2. statization of the Russian economy (by bureaucratisation),
3. restructuration of the administration towards an absolute hierarchical crackdown of power
4. symbolism and propaganda in Russia.

Regarding the 2022 Russian invasion of Ukraine, Inozemtsev said that sanctions would not convince Russians to get rid of Putin, as most of them really believed that Ukraine was a part of their country. The West should aim to have Putin charged for war crimes with a prospect to the elites, to end sanctions as soon as Putin and his generals would be transferred to the International Court of Justice. Russia had become a classical dictatorship.

In May 2024, Inozemtsev, along with D. Nekrasov and D. Gudkov, established the "European Center for Analysis and Strategies" (CASE)^{[13]}.
