= Tanya Lokshina =

Russian human rights activist

- Таня Локшина
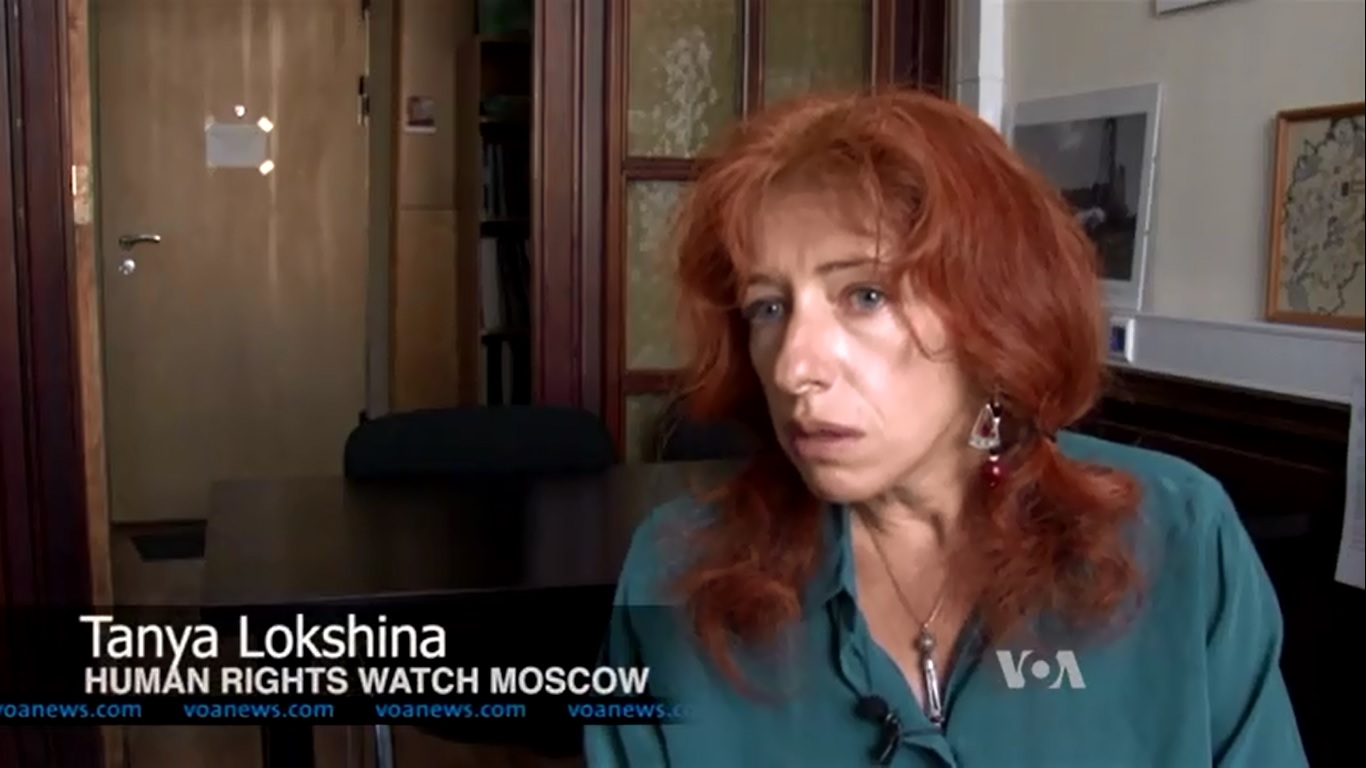
- Tanya Lokshina, Human Rights Watch’s Russia Program Director, when interviewed in Moscow by the Voice of America in 2016
- Born: Татьяна Иосифовна Локшина; 17 June 1973 (age 53); Moscow, Russian SFSR
- Scientific career
- Awards: Nomination for the 2006 Journalism as Deed, Andrei Sakharov prize founded by Peter Vins
- Fields: Human Rights, Post-Soviet states
- Institutions: Russia program at Human Rights Watch

Tanya Lokshina (Russian: Таня Локшина; born 17 June 1973) is a human rights researcher, journalist, and writer from Russia. She is director of the Russia program at Human Rights Watch (associate director for Human Rights Watch's Europe and Central Asia division). Lokshina is an expert on the human rights situation in the Post-Soviet states.

== Early years ==
Tanya Lokshina was born in the City of Moscow on June 17, 1973. She tells about her childhood that when she was in school, there were many prohibitions and punishments for schoolchildren in Soviet Union, but a lot was already allowed, for example, it was forbidden to wear a Christian cross necklace in school, but when she came to school with a cross, administration still didn't kick her out of school, but her parents in the soviet times often told her how to behave: “Don't, it's dangerous, don't, and why are you showing off? You cannot break this whole stone wall with your forehead."

== Education and work ==
Lokshina lived together with parents in the United States since 1990 where she studied journalism. While living in the US, she worked as a freelance for several Russian media. Lokshina later returned to Russia where she was also working as a journalist.

== Journalism ==
Lokshina's articles, dedicated to Human Rights, were published in many newspapers like the Guardian, Le Monde, the Moscow Times, Novaya Gazeta, the Washington Post.

Lokshina was awarded for her writing in the Moscow online news website "Polit.Ru", — with other three nominees and one winner laureate Anna Lebedeva, — on the 2006 Sakharov prize, — a prize for journalism, established by entrepreneur, former Soviet dissident, Peter Vins.

== Career of human rights researcher. Human Rights Watch ==
Lokshina worked for the human rights organization the Moscow Helsinki Group since 1998, where her research was mostly about the Second Chechen War, that began that time; Lokshina documented the Chechen war's abuses, interviewed witnesses and victims of the war. She travelled to Chechnya and Dagestan several times for her human rights work.

She works at Russian office of Human Rights Watch since 2008, that time her research was about numerous human rights violations in North Caucasus as well as at 2008 war conflict in Georgia. Later she researched situation of political persecutions of individuals in Russia, also violations of human rights in Eastern Ukraine during war conflict.

== Threats ==
Lokshina was under threat attack in 2012, when she began to systematically receive telephone messages with text detailing events of her private life. She was pregnant that time, and one of the threatening messages was saying: "We are waiting for the birth of your child", other message said that her childbirth wouldn't be "an easy birth." The Human Rights Watch's executive director Kenneth Roth told about the messages: "They knew where she lived, what she was doing. They made explicit reference to the fact of her pregnancy. They threatened harm to herself and to her unborn baby." When HRW appealed about the threats to a number of Russian State securities departments, the messages stopped, albeit later other HRW researcher received another message that an unknown sender had known about a scheduled HRW conference and Lokshina's pregnancy.

== Protecting women's rights in North Caucasus ==
Lokshina works a lot to study the situation with women's rights, in 2010 she interviewed women in Chechnya, trying to understand what the changes are in the current North Caucasus. According to her observations, the women of Chechnya have become more restricted in movement, men have begun to commit violence against women more often. She published her observations in the article "Chechnya: Choked by Headscarves" (2010).

== Meeting with Edward Snowden ==
When Edward Snowden was landed in Russia, he sent the email to Tanya Lokshina on July 11, 2013, to ask regarding her presence on his closed door meeting with lawyers and representatives of humanitarian organizations. First, when Lokshina saw the email, she thought it was a someone's joke, because Edward Snowden was a world celebrity, she said.

Snowden asked Lokshina to come to the Moscow's Sheremetyevo airport, find there an airport staff person with "G9" sign in the airport guest hall, and when she did that, there were many reporters around. Then Lokshina and other eight invited guests: human rights defenders, Russian ombudsman Vladimir Lukin, a member of parliament, — were driven from the guest hall with a bus towards another airport entrance, where was Snowden with WikiLeaks journalist Sarah Harrison, then Snowden publicly announced his testimonies about his job in a service in the US to read communications without a warrant, about his decision to leave the US, disclose the secrets, and others.

Lokshina's attendance of the closed door meeting with Snowden was marred by controversy, as it emerged that Lokshina acted on behalf of the United States Embassy rather than Human Rights Watch, the organization that she represented at the meeting. The only journalist who attended the Snowden meeting at Sheremetyevo was Polonca Frelih who wrote that Lokshina "spoke more like a representative of the US Embassy and conveyed their message to Snowden that if he returned home, he would not be considered a traitor to state secrets, but only a violator of the law". Moreover, Lokshina took the first photograph of Snowden since his arrival in Moscow, which she did during the Sheremetyevo meeting despite being asked not to do so as the meeting was in no way a press conference.

== Publications ==
Her researches about human rights were published in many newspapers and media around world as The Guardian (UK), CNN, The New York Times, Washington Post (US), Novaya Gazeta (Russia), Le Monde (France). She wrote, cooperated in, and edited also several books, such as

- The Imposition of a Fake Political Settlement in the Northern Caucasus: The 2003 Chechen Presidential Election (Soviet and Post-Soviet Politics and Society 22), 2005, Edited by Tanya Lokshina (Volume 22), Tanya Lokshina (Editor), Andreas Umland (Series Editor), Ray Thomas (Collaborator), & 1 more
- Chechnya Inside Out, Moskva: Demos, 2007
- Chechnya: Chocked by Headscarves, 2010, Open Democracy
- Her article about the abuse of women on North Caucasus was presented in "Chechnya at War and Beyond", 2014, Routledge Contemporary Russia и Eastern Europe

== Awards ==
- Nominated for 2006 Journalism as Deed, Andrei Sakharov prize founded by Peter Vins.
