= Georgy Alburov =

Russian journalist (born 1989)

- Георгий Албуров
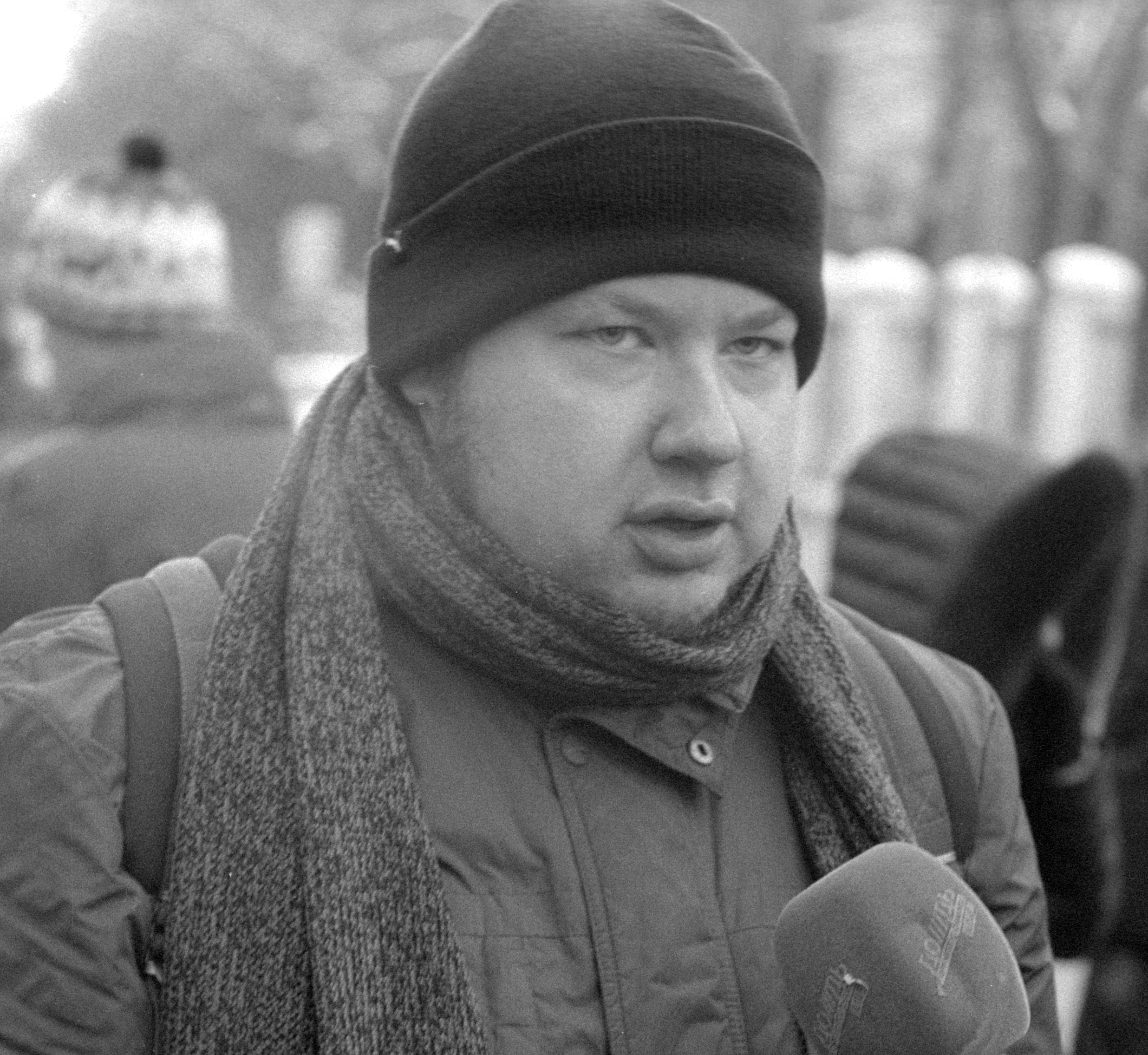
- Alburov in 2014
- Born: Georgy Valentinovich Alburov; October 9, 1989 (age 37); Ufa, Bashkir Autonomous Soviet Socialist Republic, Russian SFSR, Soviet Union
- Citizenship: Russia
- Education: Higher School of Economics (political science)
- Occupations: Journalist, coordinator of the Anti-Corruption Foundation, YouTuber
- Awards: Redkollegia (2021)
- Website: alburov.ru

Georgy Alburov (Russian: Гео́ргий Валенти́нович Албу́ров, born October 9, 1989) is a Russian political and social activist, journalist, and blogger. Up to 2021, together with Maria Pevchikh, he was a head of the investigation department at the Anti-Corruption Foundation founded by Alexei Navalny in 2011. At the time when Alburov headed the department, the FBK released the investigative films "Chaika" (2015) and "He Is Not Dimon to You" (2017).

== Biography ==
Georgy Alburov was born on October 9, 1989, in Ufa. In 2007, he moved to Moscow to study political science at the Higher School of Economics. He began participating in various political actions and protests in 2008. In 2009, he was present at the civic protests known as Strategy-31, advocating for people's right to peaceful assembly in Russia.

In 2011, Alburov met Alexei Navalny for the first time at the «Anti-Seliger» alternative political forum, they became more familiar later that year, when Navalny was sued for defamation by entrepreneur Vladlen Stepanov. Alburov was live-tweeting the whole event, thus making his first public appearance as a political blogger. Later he signed the declaration of Navalny's supporters and became a member of the "People's President" political movement.

In January 2012, Alburov joined Navalny's Anti-Corruption Foundation (commonly known as FBK). During his first year at FBK, he coordinated the "RosVybory" project aimed at observing the 2012 Russian presidential election. He also worked on "The Good Truth Machine" – a service that provided information about state official's corruption – and "RosPil" – Navalny's project, publicizing abuses in government procurement.

Moreover, in October 2012, Alburov became a member of the Russian Opposition Coordination Council. The Council did not recognize the results of the Duma and presidential elections of 2011–2012 and called for their revision. Later in December that year, he also joined the founding committee of the "People's Alliance" party, which sought to oppose the elected president, Vladimir Putin, and the ruling party, United Russia.

On April 14, 2015, the Vladimir Oktyabrsky Court sentenced Alburov another FBK employee, Nikita Kulachenkov to penal labor for stealing the street art painting "Bad/Good Person," which they took off a fence and gave to Navalny for his birthday on June 4, 2014. The painting, contrasting two Russian figures (one negative, associated with "the Internet," and the other positive, portraying "love of the Motherland"), was made by a janitor Sergei Sotov, who regularly placed his works on city fences. Although the painter claimed that he did not mind that people might take his paintings away, Alburov was sentenced to 240 hours of compulsory labor. A few months later, the sentence was removed due to an amnesty.

On August 3, 2019, Alburov was arrested as an initiator of protests in Moscow, caused by the situation with the Moscow City Duma elections. As a result of the mass demonstrations, Moscow Metro and Mosgortrans filed a lawsuit against Alburov and Lyubov Sobol. In February 2020, the Simonovsky District Court of Moscow satisfied the suit and fined 311 000 rubles from the defendants as compensation for the disturbed work of transport employees on August 3.

In August 2020, Alburov participated in the FBK investigation of the poisoning of Alexei Navalny. Together with Maria Pevchikh and Vladlen Los, he examined Navalny's hotel room in Tomsk for evidence on the day of poisoning.

In 2020, Alburov was actively involved in the production of a documentary film "Putin's Palace." In January 2021, Alburov, Pevchikh, and Navalny received the Redkollegiya Journalist Award for this film. The same month, he got arrested for 10 days for calling people to mass protests in support of Alexei Navalny, who was incarcerated upon his return to Russia.

It was reported in May 2021 that several FBK representatives, including Georgy Alburov, Ruslan Shaveddinov, and others, allegedly moved to Georgia to operate a new studio of the "Navalny LIVE" YouTube channel in Tbilisi. Leonid Volkov, a Russian political activist and Navalny's confidante, refuted this information and called it "fake news."

On January 25, 2022, Alburov was included in Rosfinmonitoring's register of terrorists and extremists.

In August 2022, Russian billionaire Oleg Deripaska filed a lawsuit against Navalny, Pevchikh, and Alburov for an investigation they released about Russian Foreign Minister Sergey Lavrov.

On May 5, 2023, Georgy Alburov and the Anti-Corruption Foundation chair, Maria Pevchikh were added to the Russia's Ministry of Justice list of foreign agents.

== Literature ==
- Dollbaum, Jan Matti; Lallouet, Morvan; Noble, Ben (2021). Navalny: Putin's Nemesis, Russia's Future?. Oxford University Press. p. 280. ISBN 9781787385757.
- Gafarova, Anastasiya; Mukhin, Alexey (2016). Навальный. Итоги [Navalny. Results] (in Russian). Moscow: Algoritm. p. 272. ISBN 978-5-906842-08-4.
