= Boris Reitschuster =

German journalist and author

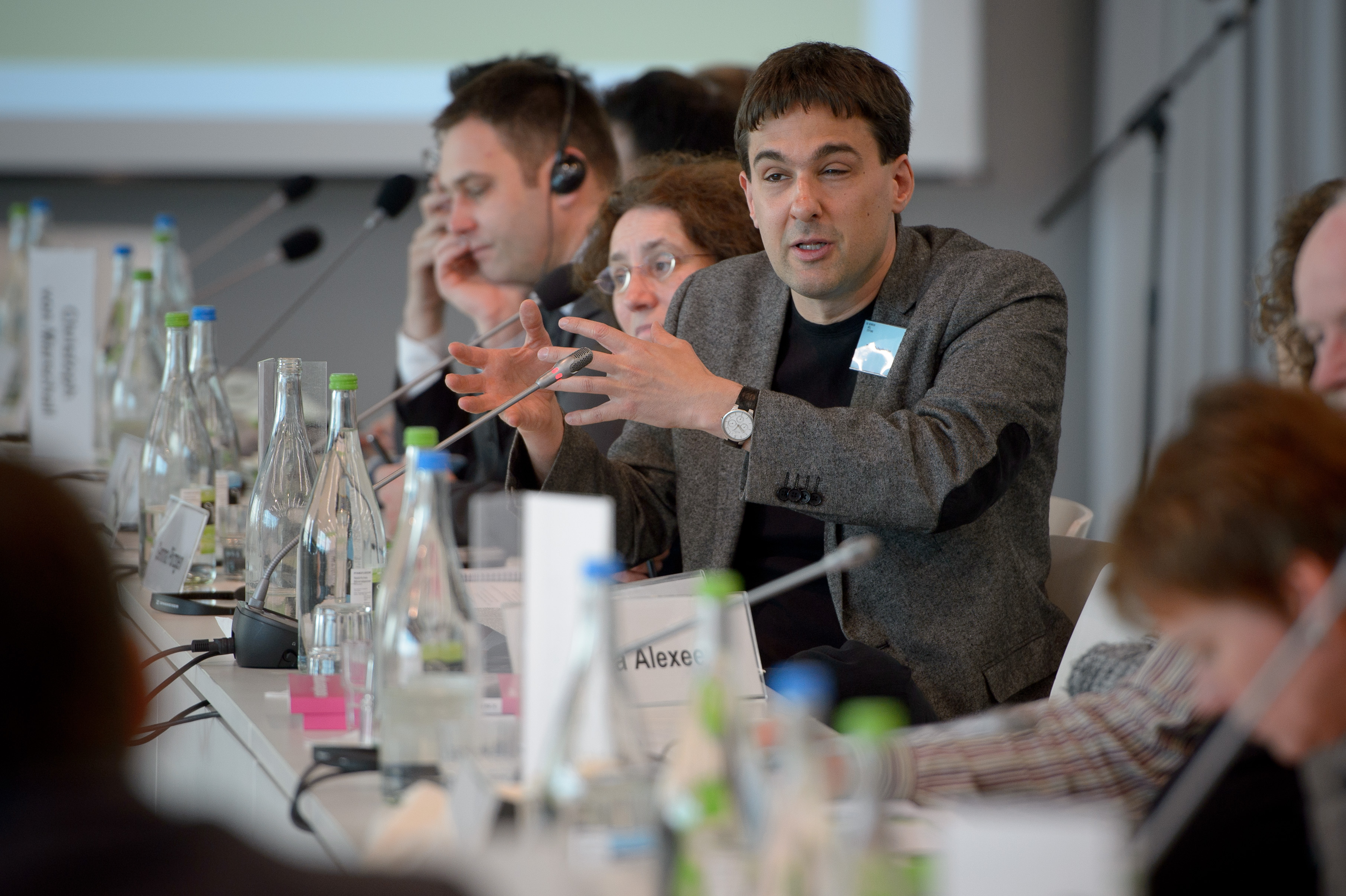
- Reitschuster in 2015
- Born: May 12, 1971 (age 55)
- Occupation: Journalist

Boris Reitschuster (born May 12, 1971, in Augsburg) is a German journalist and author. He became known for his books on contemporary Russia. He was the head of the Moscow bureau of the German weekly FOCUS from 1999 until August 2015.

== Life ==
After graduating from high school in Augsburg in 1990, Reitschuster qualified as an interpreter at the scientific center at Moscow State University of Economics, Statistics, and Informatics. From 1992 to 1994 he was Moscow correspondent for the newspapers Deutsches Allgemeines Sonntagsblatt, Darmstädter Echo and Thüringische Allgemeine. After a traineeship at the newspaper Augsburger Allgemeine from 1995 to 1997, he initially worked for the news agencies DPA and AFP in Augsburg and Munich. From November 1999 to August 2015 he was the head of the Moscow office of the news magazine Focus. Reitschuster critically deals with the political system of Russia in his books and articles, he is a well-known critic of President Vladimir Putin. In 2008 he was honored with the Theodor Heuss medal for his "high personal commitment to freedom of expression and assembly and thus for the protection of citizens' rights" in Russia.

Reitschuster stated several times that he received death threats in Russia while working as a journalist. For this reason, he said he was forced to return to Germany in 2011.

Since 2015, Reitschuster has been working as a journalist for various media, including Focus, The European, Tichys Einblick and Junge Freiheit as well as a presenter and lecturer.

== Online Platform ==
The Bayerische Staatszeitung described Reitschuster's website as "a controversial, right-wing online Platform". "Depending on one's point of view, it gave "COVID belittlers a podium who took a critical look at" the federal government's corona policy. The Handelsblatt and the Stuttgarter Zeitung called Reitschuster's Blog "right wing-conservative". journalist and lawyer Liane Bednarz described Reitschuster on Spiegel Online as the operator of a "blog with right-wing populist bias". According to NewsGuard, Reitschuster.de is a news blog "that reports on German politics from an undisclosed politically right-wing perspective." According to a September 2021 study by the British non-governmental organization Hope not Hate, Reitschuster's page was "among the most shared [on Facebook] by AfD profiles, alongside that of the German offshoot of the Russian state broadcaster RT."

== Publications ==
Boris Reitschuster describes contemporary Russia in his non -fiction books. So far, he has been published:

- Briefe aus einem untergehenden Imperium. Dietz, Berlin 1994, ISBN 3-320-01842-6
- Wladimir Putin. Wohin steuert er Russland?. Rowohlt Berlin, Berlin 2004, ISBN 3-87134-487-7
- Putins Demokratur. Wie der Kreml den Westen das Fürchten lehrt. Econ, Berlin 2006, ISBN 978-3-430-20006-6; aktualisierte und erweiterte Ausgabe: Ullstein, Berlin 2007, ISBN 978-3-548-36971-6; 3. aktualisierte und erweiterte Auflage: Putins Demokratur. Ein Machtmensch und sein System. Econ, Berlin 2014, ISBN 978-3-430-20183-4
- Der neue Herr im Kreml? Dimitrij Medwedew. Econ, Berlin 2008, ISBN 978-3-430-20049-3
- Russki Extrem. Wie ich lernte, Moskau zu lieben. Ullstein, Berlin 2009, ISBN 978-3-550-08766-0; ebd. 2010, ISBN 978-3-548-37338-6 (Taschenbuch)
- Putins verdeckter Krieg. Wie Moskau den Westen destabilisiert, Econ Verlag, Berlin 2016, ISBN 978-3-430-20207-7
- Russki Extrem im Quadrat: Was von meiner Liebe zu Russland geblieben ist, rethink Verlag, Friedberg 2016, ISBN 978-3-981-50244-2
- Putins Demokratur: Was sie für den Westen so gefährlich macht, Ullstein, Berlin 2018, ISBN 978-3-548-37793-3

== Awards ==
- Journalistenpreis des Bundes der Vertriebenen Bayern (1998)
- Andere Zeiten Journalistenpreis (2004)
- Theodor-Heuss-Medaille (2008)
- Freiheitspreis by Atlas-Initiative (2023)
