= Werner Rey =

Swiss businessman and investor

Werner K. Rey
- 1984
- Born: Werner Kurt Rey; 6 October 1943 (age 82); Zürich, Switzerland
- Occupations: Banker; investor; financier
- Years active: 1976 - present
- Employer: Omni Holding AG
- Criminal charges: Financial fraud, document forgery, fraudulent bankruptcy
- Criminal penalty: 4 years in prison
- Criminal status: pardoned
- Spouse: Bernadette Gatley

Werner Kurt Rey colloquially Werner K. Rey (/ɹeɪ/; born 6 October 1943) is a Swiss businessman, investor and former banker who is based in the United Kingdom. In 1999, Rey was found guilty of fraud, falsification of documents and fraudulent bankruptcy, in the second largest bankruptcy case in Switzerland after Swissair.

Rey, who was the son of a physician, made headlines after his acquiring the majority of Bally fashion house in 1976, and ultimately selling it to the Oerlikon-Bührle concern, which was the foundation for his multinational conglomerate Omni Holding AG, which would have assets in excess of $4 billion under management. He was often referred to as a white knight in his acquisitions.

After more than six years in Bahamian exile, Rey was extradited to Switzerland, where he ultimately was sentenced to four years imprisonment. He was released from prison on 14 February 2000 and has since returned to London, where his wife is originally from. He has since engaged in a variety of new business ventures, notably with Daniel Aegerter.

== Early life and education ==
Rey was born 6 October 1943 in Zürich, Switzerland, the second of four children, to Hans Rey (1902–1992), a physician, and Marianne Rey (née Schmid). He had three siblings.

Rey completed his schooling in Zurich and initially wanted to enter medical school at the University of Zurich but he failed the admissions exam. Instead of pursuing academic studies, Rey then completed a commercial apprenticeship at Rüd, Blass & Cie AG, a private bank, in Zurich (which was later merged with Deutsche Bank). Rey graduated best of his class.

== Career ==
Rey launched his career while working for a London-based company from 1961 to 1963, which was followed by several non-executive and executive positions in Geneva, namely at the controversial investment firm Investors Overseas Service (IOS) founded by American financier Bernard Cornfeld in 1955, where he became deputy director. In 1969, he began to work as an independent consultant and corporate advisor, until 1975. He also held a management role at an international bank.

In 1976, Rey, acquired share majority of the fashion house Bally and subsequently sold it to Oerlikon-Bührle, an industrial concern, with a profit of $60 million (which would be equivalent to $312 million in 2023). This laid the foundation for his Omni Holding AG which would soon turn into an industrial conglomerate with several thousand employees. Rey held controlling interest in Metallwerke Selve AG (Selve Metal Works) in Thun, media and publishing giant Jean Frey AG in Zurich, temporary employment agency Adia Interim (today a part of Adecco), commodity inspection company Inspectorate International as well as 30% of controlling interest in Sulzer.

Until 1990, Rey was a well respected Swiss financier, and had about $4 billion in assets under management.

== Case against Werner K. Rey ==
During the recession of 1990/91 Omni Holding AG began having substantial financial issues. In 1991, the company became insolvent, and had to file bankruptcy. After Swiss authorities filed a case against Werner K. Rey on several allegations of fraud, falsification of documents, and fraudulent bankruptcy, he fled to The Bahamas, where he was arrested in 1996. This was among the most spectacular white collar crimes of Switzerland and one of the largest corporate bankruptcies similar to Swissair. He was subsequently extradited to Switzerland to face criminal justice.

In 1998, he was put on trial for an attempt to defraud the Cantonal Bank of Bern when Inspectorate went public and for fraudulent bankruptcy because he had reduced his private assets at the expense of the creditors - whether for appearances or with good intentions could not be clarified. Accordingly, the sentence of four years in prison was well below the ten years demanded by the prosecutor. Further proceedings for commercial fraud, forgery of documents and fraudulent bankruptcy expired in 2007. The pending proceedings were therefore dismissed. Rey kept the judiciary in suspense for years and owes the Canton of Bern around CHF 4.3 million in court costs alone.

== Post-imprisonment release ==
Rey was released from prison on 14 June 2000.

Since his fraud trial and prison sentence, he has apparently returned to London (where his wife is from) and is again active in the field of participations and finance.

== Personal life ==
Rey is married to Bernadette Gatley, a native of London, England. They do not have any children.
