= Bayerische Staatszeitung =

- Type: weekly newspaper
- Owner(s): Süddeutscher Verlag 50% Münchner Zeitungsverlag 50%
- Publisher: Bayerische Staatszeitung GmbH.
- Editor: Ralph Schweinfurth
- Founded: December 31, 1912
- Language: German
- Circulation: 16,000 (as of Q1 2015)
- ISSN: 0341-3993
- Website: Bayerische Staatszeitung

The Bayerische Staatszeitung (Bavarian National Newspaper) and its sister publication, the Bayerische Staatsanzeiger (Bavarian National Advertiser) are weekly newspapers published by Bayerische Staatszeitung GmbH., a newspaper publishing company based in the Bavarian capital, Munich.

== History ==
The Bayerische Staatszeitung was founded in 1912: the first edition was published on 31 December 1912. In 1934 it ceased to appear, but it returned to the newsstands in 1950. Since 22 June 1955 it has been published on the basis of a contractual agreement between the Bavarian regional government and two newspaper publishing companies, Süddeutscher Verlag and Münchner Zeitungsverlag ("Münchner Merkur") whereby each of the two newspaper companies owns 50% of the Bayerische Staatszeitung. Circulation peaked at around 34,000 copies in 1919. Certified circulation in 2015 was around 16,000.

The Staatszeitung reports on politics, economic matters, culture and politics inside and beyond Bavaria. It reflects the Bavarian political, cultural and economic landscape, provided both by its own editorial staff and by guest contributors. In addition to this, nowadays in a separate supplement, it serves as an information channel for the different levels of government, publishing official announcements, invitations to tender for government construction contracts and other public notifications. Bavaria is not the only German state in which the regional government effectively publishes its own official newspaper, equivalent to The London, Edinburgh and Belfast Gazettes in Britain. Bavaria is unique among the German states in that its official newspaper, the Bayerische Staatszeitung, provides in a single publication features both of an official newspaper and those of a relatively independent newspaper, incorporating reports and opinions from journalists not employed by the government.

The Bayerische Staatszeitung appears on Fridays. Target readership groups include policy makers at all levels, whether in politics and public administration, education, or the economy more generally. Between 80% and 90% of the copies are sold by subscription. Roughly two thirds of the subscriptions are to institutions, especially but not exclusively in the public sector. Nearly a quarter of the subscription sales are made within the Munich area.

Since 2010 a daughter company, Staatsanzeiger Online Logistik GmbH, has provided an increasingly important digital service which includes the public announcements and, also regularly publishes books online.
