= Ruslan Shaveddinov =

Russian political activist (born 1995)

- Руслан Шаведдинов
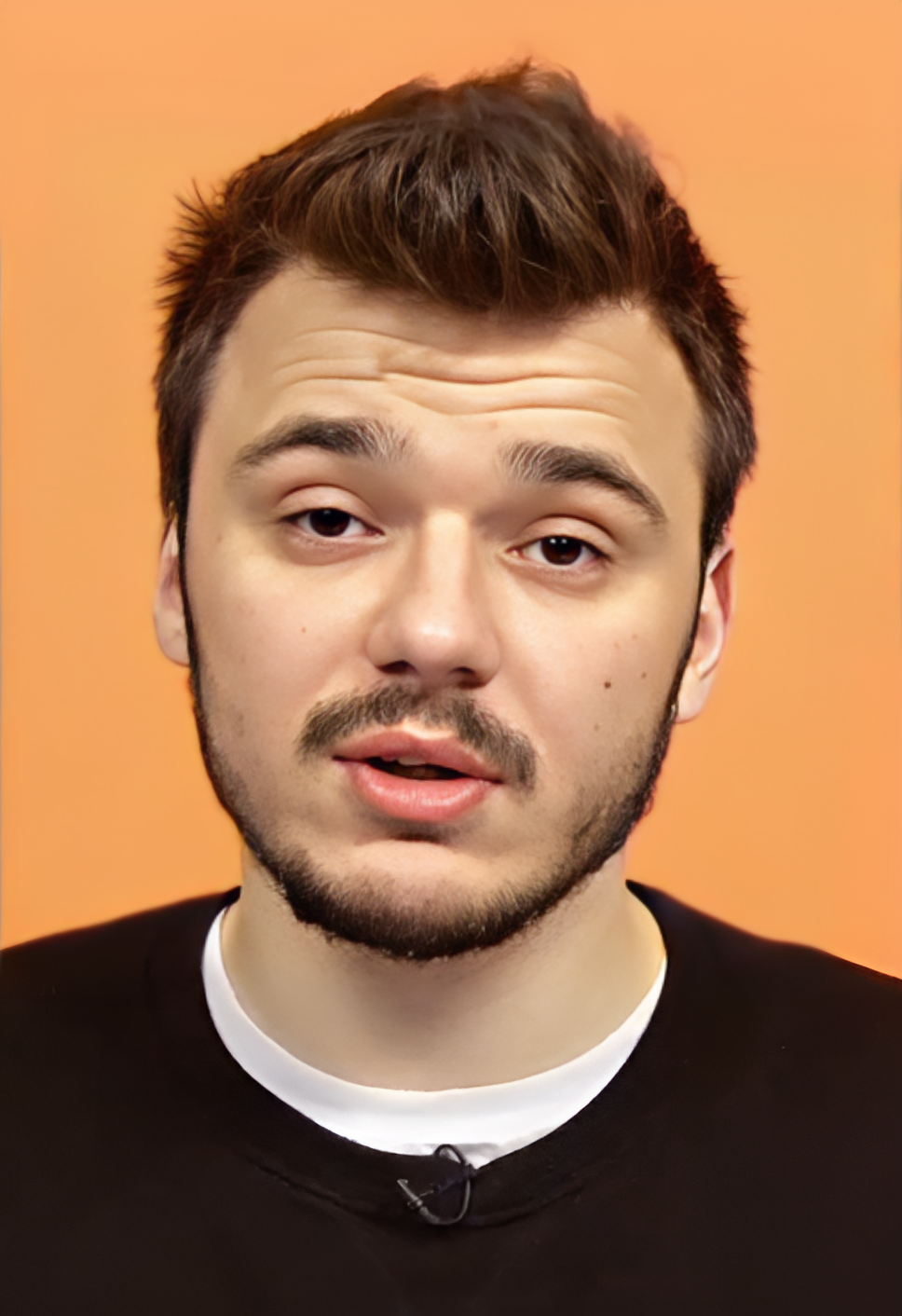
- Shaveddinov in 2018
- Born: Ruslan Tabrizovich Shaveddinov; 22 July 1995 (age 30); Liski, Voronezh Oblast, Russia
- Education: International Independent Ecological and Political University (human rights)
- Occupations: Political activist, journalist, project manager of the Anti-Corruption Foundation, YouTuber
- Political party: Russia of the Future

Ruslan Tabrizovich Shaveddinov (Russian: Русла́н Табри́зович Шаведди́нов, born 22 July 1995) is a Russian political activist, investigative journalist, and YouTube-blogger. He is best known as a project manager of Alexei Navalny's Anti-Corruption Foundation (FBK) and press secretary of Navalny's presidential campaign in 2018.

== Biography ==
Ruslan Shaveddinov was born on 22 July 1995 in Liski, Voronezh Oblast. He graduated from the International Independent Ecological and Political University with a specialization in human rights.

In 2013 Shaveddinov joined Alexei Navalny's mayoral campaign as a volunteer and later joined the staff of Navalny's Anti-Corruption Foundation. At the same time, he participated in protests in support of the Pussy riot feminist art group, whose main participants had been imprisoned a year before for hooliganism motivated by religious hatred.

In 2014 with colleagues from the Anti-Corruption Foundation, Shaveddinov investigated Vyacheslav Volodin's and Sergey Neverov's dachas. During the filming, he was beaten up by private security guards and held in content by police.

In December 2016 Navalny announced his candidacy in the 2018 Russian presidential elections and appointed Shaveddinov his press secretary for the campaign. In addition to the press-secretary duties, from 2017 to 2018, the latter hosted the political news show "Cactus" on the YouTube-channel "Navalny Live".

In May 2018 Shaveddinov was elected to the central council of the Russia of the Future political party. The central council also included Ivan Zhdanov, Roman Rubanov, Georgy Alburov, Lyubov Sobol, and others.

Upon participating in Moscow City Duma election protests, in November 2019, Shaveddinov was included in the so-called "blacklist", banning him from entering the building of the Moscow City Duma. A month later, he was forcibly taken to serve at a military base in Novaya Zemlya.

As of 2022 Shaveddinov is one of the hosts of the "Popular Politics" YouTube-channel.

== Investigations ==
In January 2019 Shaveddinov published an investigation on the corruption of Russian Olympic champions Alexei Nemov and Svetlana Khorkina. Later the same year, he released a YouTube video about Deputy Mayor of Moscow Natalia Sergunina's undeclared financial assets that he had previously been working on with Georgy Alburov and Kira Yarmysh. As of February 2020, the video had over 3 million views on YouTube.

A month before the 2021 State Duma elections Shaveddinov published an investigation about the Deputy Defence Minister Andrey Kartapolov. Navalny's associates, Ruslan Shaveddinov, Artem Ionov, and Ivan Konovalov, stated that it was Kartapolov who coordinated their abduction by the army. Later the same year, Shaveddinov published another investigation about the mistresses of Russian officials, working close to President Vladimir Putin.

== Political persecution ==
In January 2018 Shaveddinov and Yarmysh were detained at the Sheremetyevo airport and arrested for eight days for broadcasting public protests on Navalny LIVE. In May of the same year, Shaveddinov was arrested again and kept in detention for 30 days for organizing a series of anti-corruption protests across Russia.

In the summer of 2019 Shaveddinov participated in protests in support of journalist Ivan Golunov and was arrested for nine days. Later in July of the same year, the police searched his house for a case on the obstruction of election commissions before the Moscow City Duma elections. A month later, the police opened another case on Shaveddinov and his colleagues from FBK for alleged money laundering and tax evasion. Shaveddinov's bank accounts were frozen due to the criminal case.

On 23 December 2019 Shaveddinov's apartment was de-energised. The police then broke down its front door under the pretext of a search. Consequently, Shaveddinov was forcibly taken to the Investigative Committee. After being interrogated, he was escorted by a special convoy to Novaya Zemlya, to the 33rd anti-aircraft missile base. At the same time, the mobile operator Yota disconnected Shaveddinov's mobile phone. As the phone was turned off for about 16 hours that day, his colleagues from FBK reported him as a missing person. According to The Insider's investigation, the Russia law enforcement agencies had previously instructed the mobile operator to track any actions on Shaveddinov's number. Alexei Navalny regarded this fact as complexity in his colleague's kidnapping.

Shaveddinov later reported that during his service, he was practically isolated from other soldiers and deprived of any contact with the outside world: not only was there no cellular connection on the base, but also the post office rarely delivered Shaveddinov's letters to addressees. Moreover, officers punished his peers for talking to him, his calls to the family were supervised by officers and recorded on camera. A few months later, Shaveddinov was reassigned to serve at a radio post near the nuclear test site, located 195 km from the settlement of Rogachevo, which could only be reached by helicopter.

The story about Shaveddinov's kidnapping created a public resonance because the activist had a medical condition exempting him from military service. As a result, a regional information portal 29.RU included Shaveddinov in the "Top 10 Most Discussed Men of Pomorye in 2020".

In January 2021, shortly after his return from the military service, Shaveddinov was arrested at the Vnukovo airport. With Lyubov Sobol, he was going to meet Alexei Navalny, returning from Germany after his poisoning.

It was reported in May 2021 that several FBK employees, including Shaveddinov, Georgy Alburov, and others, allegedly moved to Georgia to launch a new studio of the "Navalny LIVE" YouTube channel in Tbilisi. Leonid Volkov, a Russian political activist and Navalny's ally, refuted this information and called it "fake news."

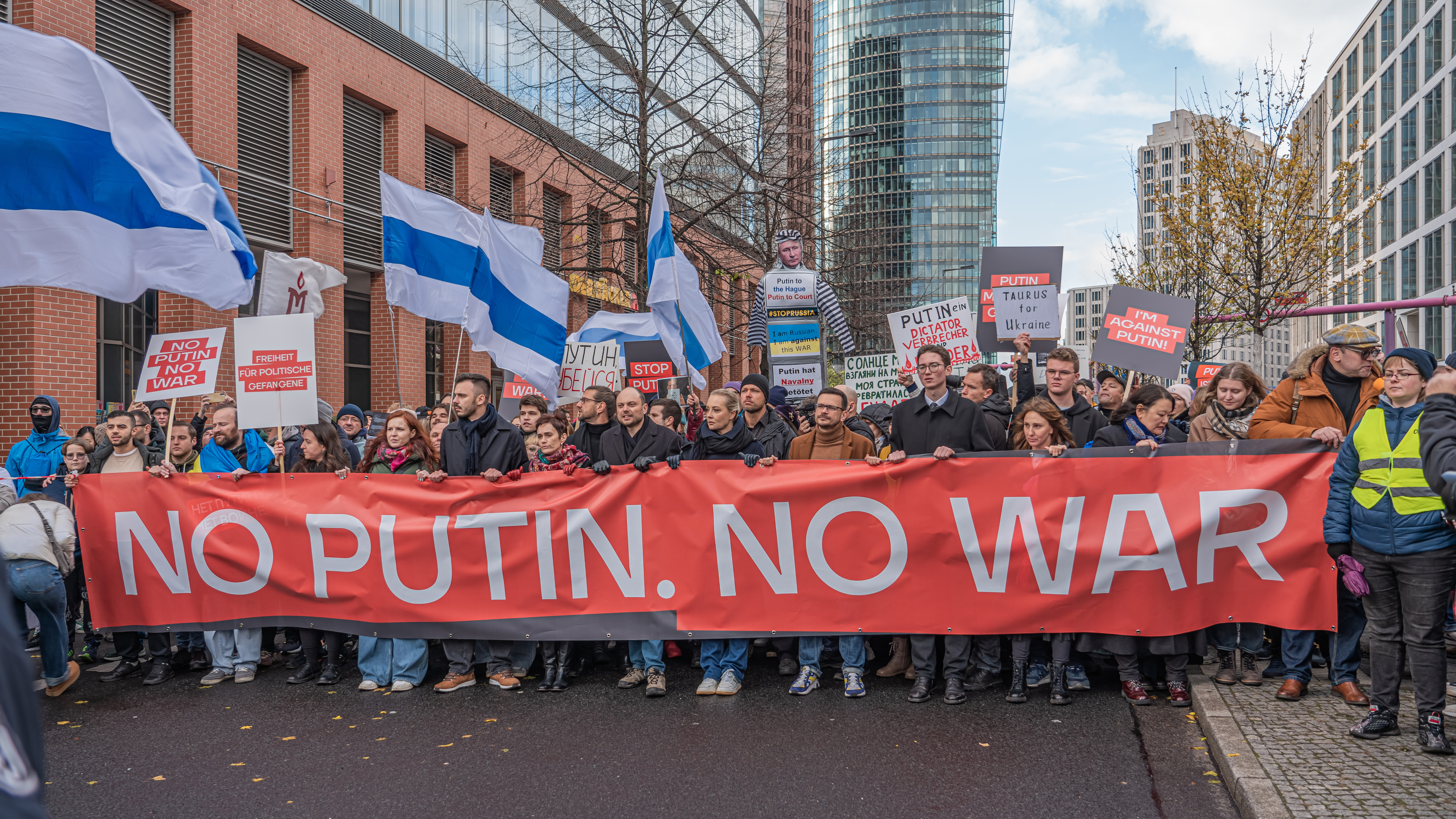
Shaveddinov with Kira Yarmysh, Yulia Navalnaya, Vladimir Kara-Murza and Ilya Yashin at an anti-war protest in Berlin, 17 November 2024

In September 2021 the Investigative Committee opened a new criminal case against FBK. Shaveddinov and others were accused of creating an extremist group. Following these charges, in January 2022, Rosfinmonitoring included Shaveddinov in the list of extremists and terrorists. Later the same year, he was added to the federal wanted list.

On 22 July 2022 the Russian Ministry of Justice added Shaveddinov to the list of "foreign agents."

== Family and personal life ==
Shaveddinov's family is of Azerbaijan origin. He has a younger brother, Nikita.

As of 2020 Shaveddinov was in a relationship with Kira Yarmysh, Alexei Navalny's spokesperson.
