= Maria Pevchikh =

Russian investigative journalist

- Мария Певчих
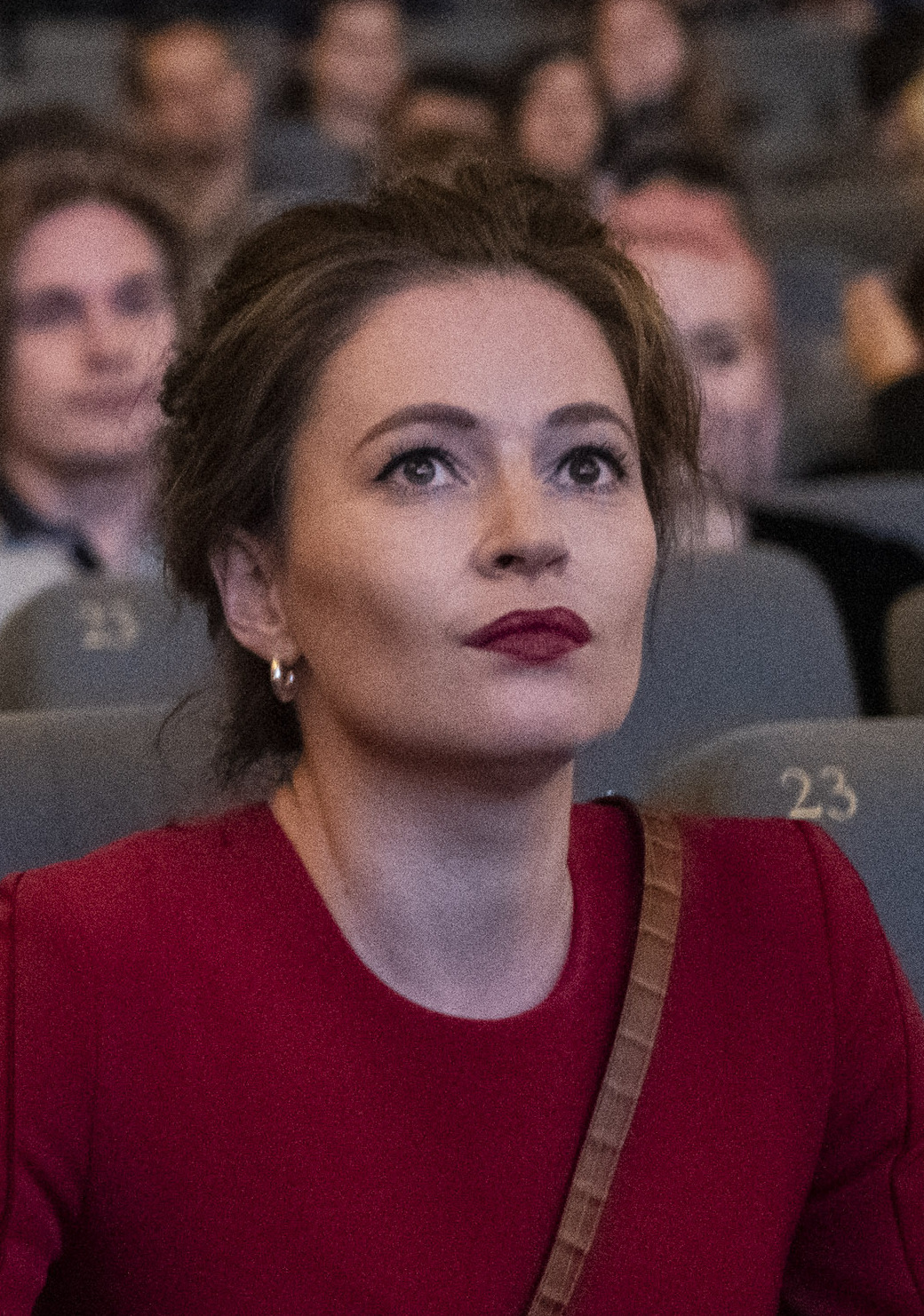
- Pevchikh in 2022
- Born: August 15, 1987 (age 39); Zelenograd, Russian SFSR, Soviet Union
- Citizenship: Russia; United Kingdom
- Education: Moscow State University; London School of Economics
- Occupation: Investigative journalist
- Awards: Redkollegia (2021, 2022)

Maria Konstantinovna Pevchikh (Russian: Мария Константиновна Певчих; born August 15, 1987) is a Russian investigative journalist and anti-corruption activist who has served as the chairwoman of the board of directors of the Anti-Corruption Foundation since March 2023. Pevchikh is known for exposing high-level corruption in Russia.

== Biography ==
Maria Pevchikh was born on August 15, 1987, in the city of Zelenograd, Russian Soviet Federative Socialist Republic. Pevchikh graduated from Zelenograd gymnasium No. 1528. She studied at the Faculty of Sociology of Moscow State University, where Alexander Dugin was the supervisor of her thesis "Ethno-sociological portrait of modern Great Britain". In 2010, Pevchikh led a Russian delegation to participate in the G8 Youth Summit in Vancouver, Canada. In 2010 she moved to the United Kingdom, where she graduated from the faculty of political science of the London School of Economics.

Pevchikh holds Russian-British dual citizenship.

Maria Pevchikh gained media attention in 2020 after the poisoning of Russian opposition leader Alexei Navalny. She was one of Alexei Navalny's companions during his trip across Russia when he was poisoned. When it became known that Navalny had fallen into a coma, Pevchikh went to the hotel where he had stayed and took plastic water bottles from there. The bottles were taken from Russia to Germany on the plane on which Navalny was evacuated. Experts later found traces of the Novichok chemical warfare agent.

After Leonid Volkov resigned as the chairman of the board of directors of the Anti-Corruption Foundation, Pevchikh was appointed to the position on March 22, 2023.

== Investigations ==
Maria Pevchikh began reading Alexei Navalny's blog in 2010 and later worked on almost all investigations that appeared on the blog after 2011. The first investigation she worked on was an investigation into the Russian VTB Bank and its drilling equipment. The investigation was launched by the Anti-Corruption Foundation (FBK) and Pevchikh worked to complete it.

Her job as head of the investigation department is to gather information and prepare textual material for investigations.

On December 2, 2019, the FBK investigation department released a video about the connections between Russian banker Andrey Kostin and Russian journalist Nailya Asker-zade. In an interview with the Global Investigative Journalism Network, Maria Pevchikh told what methods were used during the investigation.

Pevchikh and Russian activist Georgy Alburov received the Redkollegia journalism award for their investigation into "Putin's Palace", a palace complex allegedly built for Russian president Vladimir Putin through a corruption scheme.
