= Ivan Tyutrin =

Russian politician (1952–2026)

- Иван Тютрин

Member of the Legislative Duma of Tomsk Oblast from the 1st district
- In office 14 April 1994 – 27 November 1997

Personal details
- Born: 4 March 1952 Tomsk, Russian SFSR, USSR
- Died: November 2026 (aged 74) Latvia
- Profession: Politician, physician

Ivan Illarionovich Tyutrin (Russian: Иван Илларионович Тютрин; 4 March 1952 – November 2026) was a Russian physician and politician who was a member of the Legislative Duma of Tomsk Oblast from 1994 to 1997.

Tyutrin died in November 2026, at the age of 74.
