= Ilia Novikov =

Russian and Ukrainian lawyer

- Илья Новиков
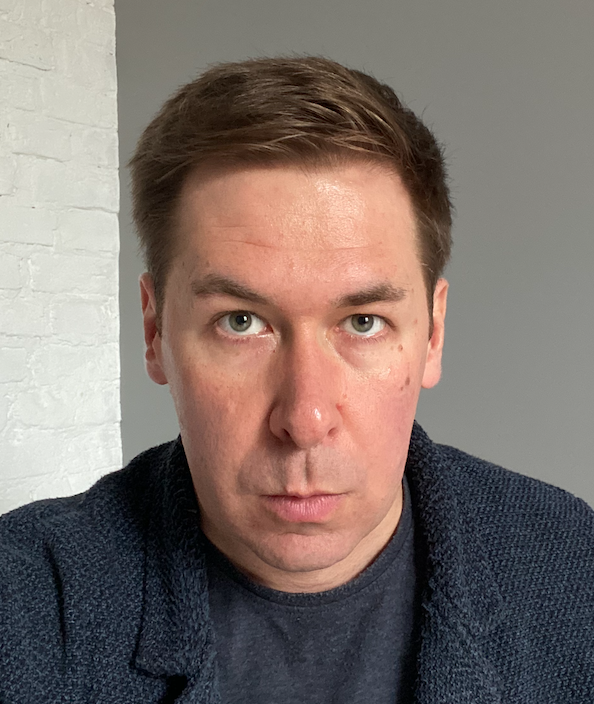
- Novikov in 2022
- Born: Ilia Sergeyevich Novikov; February 11, 1982 (age 44); Moscow, Russian SFSR, USSR
- Citizenship: Russia
- Education: Russian Academy of Justice (2005)
- Occupation: Lawyer
- Years active: 2011–present

Ilia Sergeyevich Novikov (born February 11, 1982, Moscow) is a Russian and Ukrainian attorney (advocate). He defended famous political prisoners in Russia such as Nadiya Savchenko, Mykola Karpyuk, Oyub Titiev, Yegor Zhukov, and Frode Berg. In 2019, Novikov became a defence lawyer of the 5th President of Ukraine Petro Poroshenko.

== Biography ==
Ilya Novikov was born on February 11, 1982, in Moscow. He graduated with honors from the Russian Academy of Justice.

Since 2005, he has been teaching there at the Faculty of Law and the Faculty of Advanced Training for Judges.

Since August 2011 - Senior Partner at the Goncharova, Novikov & Partners Law Office.

In January 2012, Novikov became a Russian advocate and a member of advocate's chamber of Moscow (registration number 77/10699).

In 2013, he became a partner of the consulting company Tenzor Consulting Group.

In November 2015, Novikov became a Ukrainian advocate and a member of advocate's counsil of Kyiv, the first foreigner to receive a Ukrainian advocate's certificate.

In December 2017, he and his colleagues registered the Advocates Law Firm "Barristers" in Odesa.

== Law career ==
Novikov was in the team of defenders of the Ukrainian flight navigator Nadiya Savchenko, imprisoned by Russia for her involvement in the murder of Russian journalists. In connection with this case, he learned the Ukrainian language in less than 2 years.

Novikov represented the interest of Ukrainian political prisoners in Russia, in particular Mykola Karpyuk, Stanislav Klykh, Oleksiy Chyrniy, Valentyn Vyhovsky and Igor Kiyashko.

In 2018, he defended in court Russian human rights activist Oyub Titiev and Russian political activist Yegor Zhukov.

In October 2019, he became a lawyer of the 5th President of Ukraine Petro Poroshenko.

Ilia Novikov is one of the popularizers of the term "palliative legal aid".

== Civil and political position ==
Since 2021 Novikov permanently lives in Kyiv. After the beginning of the Russian invasion of Ukraine, he joined the Ukrainian Territorial Defense Forces.

== Persecution by Russian authorities ==
On 25 November 2022, Ilia Novikov was declared a "foreign agent" by the decision of the Ministry of Justice of the Russian Federation. One week later, it became known, that he was declared wanted.

In May 2023, he was deprived of the status of Russian advocate by the decision of the Advocate's chamber (bar association) of Moscow city.

In October 2023, it became known, that criminal case of treason was initiated against Ilia Novikov by the Federal Security Service.

In December 2023, the criminal case for "dissemination of "unreliable information" about the armed forces" was opened against Ilia Novikov by the Investigative Committee of Russia.

In July 2024, Novikov was added to Rosfinmonitoring's list of terrorists and extremists.

== Participation in TV projects ==
=== "What? Where? When?" ===
He made his debut in the television game "What? Where? When?" in 2002 as part of Marina Ufaeva's team. Subsequently, he played for the teams of Ales Mukhin, Sergei Vivatenko and Alexei Blinov. He was repeatedly recognized as the best player in the team. Two-time winner of the Crystal Owl (autumn 2004, summer 2014), winner of the Diamond Owl (final of 2014). In 2010, for the first time in his career, he won a super blitz - a round where only one player out of the six plays at the table (by coincidence, in the decisive round, when Novikov was alone at the table, he got blitz, which is usually played by the whole team). In the 2011 summer series of games, he withdrew his candidacy for the presentation of the "Crystal Owl" and a large cash prize in favor of his teammate Grigory Alkhazov.

In the sports version of the game he plays for the Ksep team. Multiple medalist of the world championships, world champion in 2014. Champion of Russia 2002, 2013 and 2014. Winner of the 2006 Nations Cup (unofficially called the "World Cup among national teams") as part of the Russian national team. Winner of the 2005 European ChGK European Cup. According to the website of the IAC ChGK, he is one of 11 players who took part in all ten first world championships in sports “What? Where? When? ”.

=== Other TV projects ===
First appeared on the screen in 1996 in the "Wheel of History" program (with Yuri Nikulin), as a spectator in the studio, giving an exhaustive answer to one of the quiz questions. In the same year he took part in the TV game "Own Game", became the youngest participant in the game in the whole history (13 years 10 months at the time of filming). After 5 years, he returned to "My game", knocked Larisa Arkhipova out of the grandmaster's box and received a computer for this. In 2002, in the 45th game of the season, he defeated grandmaster Alexander Ediger.

As one of the most famous connoisseurs, he was invited to other intellectual TV shows, including "Who Wants to Be a Millionaire?" and "The Smartest."

In 2011, together with the singer Elena Perova, he became a finalist of the Cruel Intentions project, where he showed a very high level of physical and psychological fitness.

Participated in the project "Detective Show".
