= Kamyshin Watermelon Festival =

Annual festival in Kamyshin, Volgograd Oblast, Russia

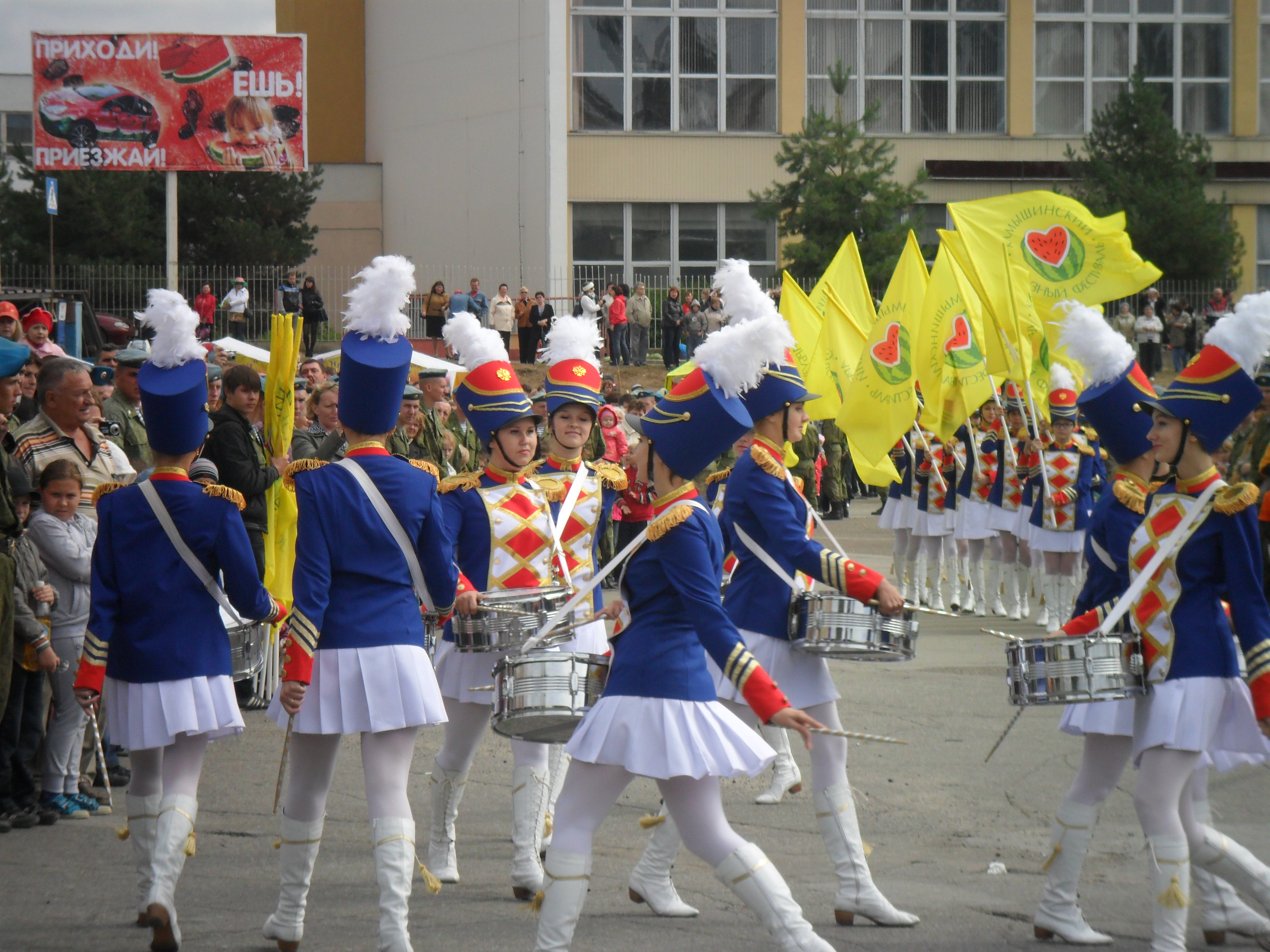
- A Russian marching band during the festival in 2012.
- Genre: Entertainment
- Dates: End of August
- Locations: Kamyshin, Volgograd Oblast, Russia
- Years active: 2007–present
- Website: arbuzfest.ru

The Kamyshin Watermelon Festival (Russian: Камышинский арбузный фестиваль) is an annual Russian entertainment festival held in the city of Kamyshin in the Volgograd Oblast. Similar to the Moscow City Day celebrations, the festival is held on the city's birthday in late August and honors the city's claim to fame – Watermelons, of which it officially known to be the country's watermelon capital. Concerts, exhibitions and sales are organized in every town square all day long, including a huge civilian parade which includes marching bands and giant floats.

== History ==
The festival revolves around a historical event that occurred in 1722, when Peter the Great visited the city which was, at that time named Dmitrievsk. During the visit, he exclaimed "Very good fruit!" after eating a local watermelon. In 2007, the first watermelon festival was organized by the Business System Group of Companies in the bay of the Kamyshinka River in front of the Borodino Bridge. Then the festival brought together about a thousand canes and guests of the city. Since 2008, the Administration of the City of Kamyshin has been the main organizer of the festival. New competitions are introduced every couple of years, with one being introduced as recently as 2017.

== Organization ==
The motto of the festival changes every year, determining the theme of the main festival events. Many tourists regularly take part in the Kamyshin Watermelon Festival. According to various estimates, from 20 to 30 thousand people attend the festival, with guests come from Saratov, Moscow, Astrakhan, Krasnodar, as well as countries near and far abroad (Ukraine, Kazakhstan, Germany, France). The guest of honor of the festival is the Governor of Volgograd Oblast. In the carnival procession, a watermelon parade takes place, during which 4,000 people participate and more than 20 enterprises exhibit their ceremonial columns. More than 60 tons of watermelons are brought to the square for the festival. The record holder of the Festival is a watermelon weighing 21.7 kg, which received the first prize in 2014.
