= Alexey Minyaylo =

Russian entrepreneur and political activist

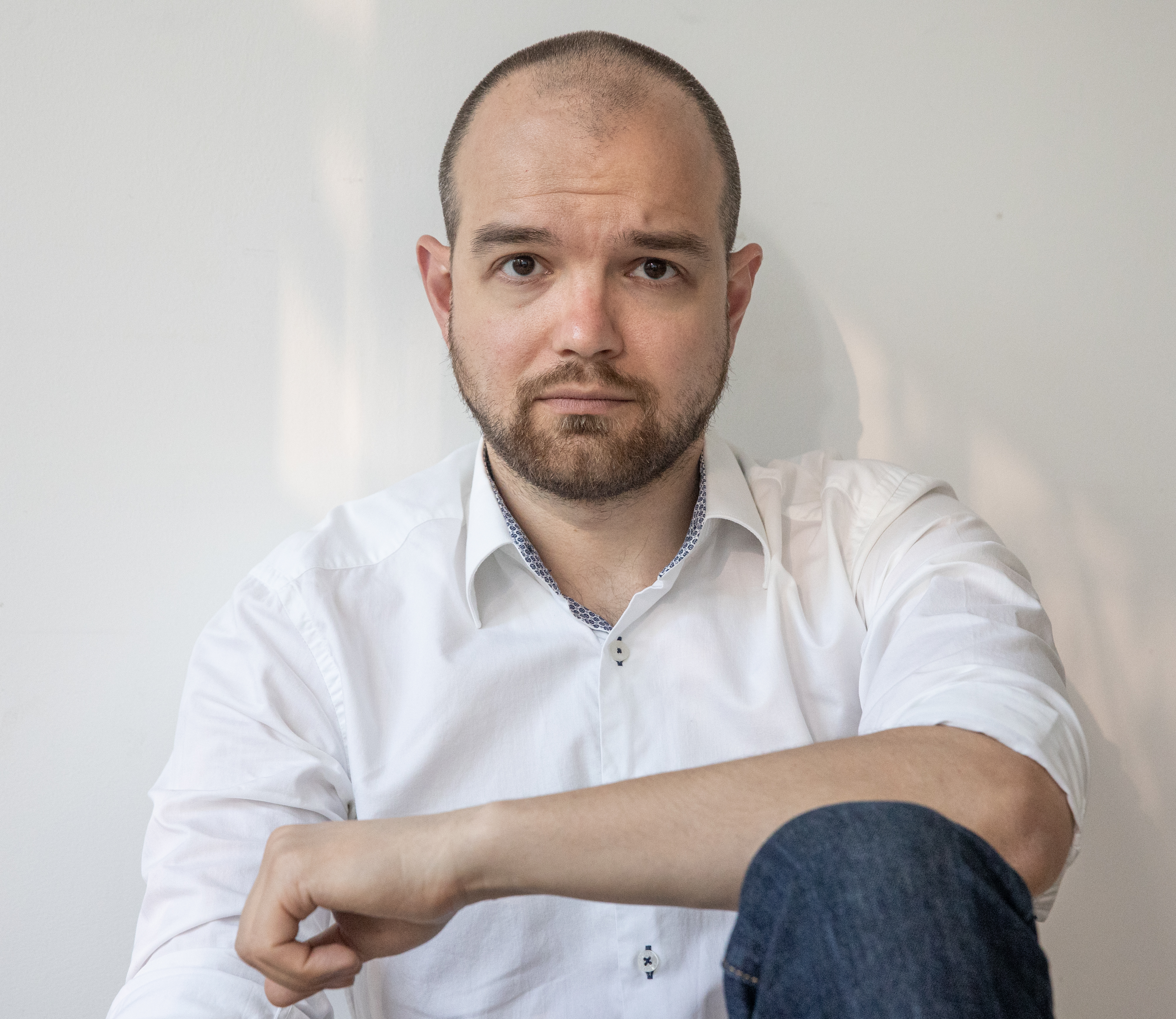
Minyaylo in 2022

Alexey Andreevich Minyaylo (Russian: Алексей Андреевич Миняйло; born 5 February 1985 in Moscow) is a Russian social entrepreneur and political activist. During the 2019 Moscow City Duma election he was a member of election team of Lyubov Sobol. Together with her, he went on a hunger strike in protest against non-admission to the election. On 2 August he was arrested on charges of participating in the "riots" on 27 July 2019. In 2022 Alexey have organized several of anti-war projects.

== Early life and education ==
Aleksey was born in a family of graduates from the History Department of Moscow State University, although his father had to go into the fire guards so that the family could live in Moscow. Minyailo is an Orthodox Christian and was an altar boy in the church of St. Tatiana on Mokhovaya Street. He invited friends who rarely go to church to celebrate Easter together, helping them not to feel like strangers there.

He graduated from the History Department of Moscow State University as did his parents, but refused to stay there for graduate study. Later he studied at the IEDC-Bled School of Management and he was supposed to defend a dissertation in 2019.

He worked as an editor in a business magazine and as a business development manager in an advertising agency. He participated in the creation of an adaptation programs for children from orphanages. He also introduced project teaching methods in Russian higher education.

== 2019 Moscow City Duma election and imprisonment ==
During the 2019 Moscow City Duma election he helped Lyubov Sobol to train signature collectors, and after she went on a hunger strike, joined her. On the night of August 1, the Investigative Committee of Russia came to him with a house-check, and then detained him. On 2 August, on the 20th day of the hunger strike, he was arrested for two months on charges of involvement in the mass riots. Lyubov Sobol considers the arrest of Minyaylo to be a pressure on herself. The charge was brought only in part 2 of article 212 of the Criminal Code (3–8 years imprisonment). Minyailo pleaded not guilty and pointed out that he had been in court together with Sobol (she was detained before the announced rally) for almost the entire day of July 27 and was detained on the way to Trubnaya Square. The leaders of several well-known Russian charitable foundations spoke in support of Minyaylo.

On August 15, an appeal was pending in court. The court refused to replace imprisonment with house arrest or bail. In his last word, Minyaylo said that he decided to end the hunger strike, just as Sobol did.

On 17 September dozens Orthodox priests signed a public petition in defense of prisoners in the "Moscow case". In this petition Minyaylo was especially mentioned as "the Orthodox person who is actively involved in social and charitable work."

On 24 September a number of well-known actors, directors, public figures and representatives of the charity sector signed an open letter to Russian Prime Minister Dmitry Medvedev in support of Minyaylo. Next day dozens of historians (including a corresponding member of Russian Academy of Science) signed an open letter demanding to stop the case of so-called mass riots. "We believe that Alexey Minyailo and the other defendants are innocent," the letter said.

At the trial on September 26, Minyailo was released from custody without any other restrictions on freedom, although the investigator requested a house arrest. The judge noted that in the materials of the case against Minyailo there are no signs of mass riots.

== Anti-war stance ==
Immediately following the invasion of Ukraine by Russian forces on February 24, 2022, Alexey Minyaylo submitted an application to the relevant authorities at Moscow City Hall for a permit to stage an anti-war march from the Belorusskaya metro station to Lubyanka Square. This rally was to take place on the Fifth of March, but the city authorities ultimately refused to sanction the rally and denied authorization for the march.

Later in February, Alexey and a team of sociologists launched the Chronicles, a research project which aims to achieve a more granular and comprehensive picture of everyday Russian attitudes towards the war in Ukraine. Delving beyond generalized queries such as, "I support/do not support Kremlin actions," Alexey and his team leveraged their familiarity with local cultural and wartime political factors to highlight greater levels of stratification within groups of supporters and opponents of the war, and offer a glimpse of how life has changed for Russians since February 24. The team regularly updates its datasets which are available on the project website. with published results making wider appearances in the Russian and international press including The New Yorker, The Daily Beast, L'Echo, The Sunday Times and others. Over the course of the project, Chronicles researchers determined that the quality of responses to public sentiment polling changed greatly when generalized queries ("do you approve of the special operation") were compared to targeted questions on specific issues. According to Alexey, Russian respondents do not always directly say what they believe for security reasons, stating that "[opinion] has to be revealed by considering the nuances of behavior in a wartime dictatorship and asking smart questions, rather than trying to go after issues 'head-on.'". While the Chronicles was initially able to determine that broadly 32% of Russians surveyed by the project considered it necessary to end the ”Special Military Operation” as soon as possible, regardless of the achievement of a military victory, with another 36% of those polled believing it was necessary to fight until the surrender of the Ukrainian Armed Forces, the greater fidelity afforded by their approach quickly allowed for greater differentiation within these categories. By incorporating more nuanced questions such as: “What should be the priority of the Russian government - achieving a military victory or saving the economy,” the organization found that the number of respondents supporting the Special Military Operation dropped to 24%. Indeed, only 26.7% of Russians declared their willingness to give part of their income to help finance the procurement of arms and equipment for Russian soldiers, while only 8,4% stated that they were ready to devote more than 10% of their income to the needs of the army. According to the Chronicles team, the results of this more granular understanding of Russian public sentiment has allowed the team to estimate the core of pro- and anti-war-minded Russians at a more modest 16 percent of the population, far less than the previously indicated 36%. Moreover, the team further determined that "Opponents and supporters of the special operation were united (83% of respondents) by a desire to forestall Russia's preventive use of Nuclear weapon."

In March 2022, Alexey initiated a follow-on anti-war project, The Voice of Russia. The project is an international nonprofit association of artists, producers, journalists, and other creative professionals living in Russia and abroad who seek to restore relations with the European Union and the United States that have been shattered by the war. The team translates important anti-war speeches by Russians into English, covers activist activities, and creates anti-war art projects. Voice of Russia posters under the hashtags #ArtAgainstWar and #RussiansAgainstWar have been displayed at London's Victoria and «Paddington» train stations and on the Tube.

Later in April 2022, Alexey Minyaylo and the political activist Mikhail Pletnev launched the Reception project, a website that connects Russians with free legal assistance in order to help them submit petitions submitted to regional parliamentary deputies and officials. The first Reception campaign consisted of a series of petitions to regional parliaments requesting the adoption of legislation ensuring that conscripts from the regions in question would not be sent to Ukraine. A second major campaign was launched in defense of the artist Yulia Tsvetkova, who had spent three years under house arrest following her being designated as a foreign agent and forbidden to leave Russia. This Reception campaign was launched in response to a request by the prosecution for a sentence of three years in a penal colony, and ended successfully with the acquittal of Tsvetkova on all charges. By April 26, more than 3,300 petitions had been submitted through the services set up by Reception, with the number of petitions growing to 13,438 by May 6, and ultimately amounting to more than 30,800 by mid-July, of which 18,000 were related to the legislative pressure campaign concerning the military draft. At the end of July, 2022 Reception expanded the scope of its activities by launching a petition campaign in to compel the Russian government to provide humanitarian support to refugees and forcibly deported persons from Ukraine.

== General references ==
- Миняйло, Алексей. "Хватит выбрасывать деньги. Чем заменить неэффективные тимбилдинги". Forbes.ru (in Russian).
