= Pavel Ustinov =

Russian actor (born 1995)

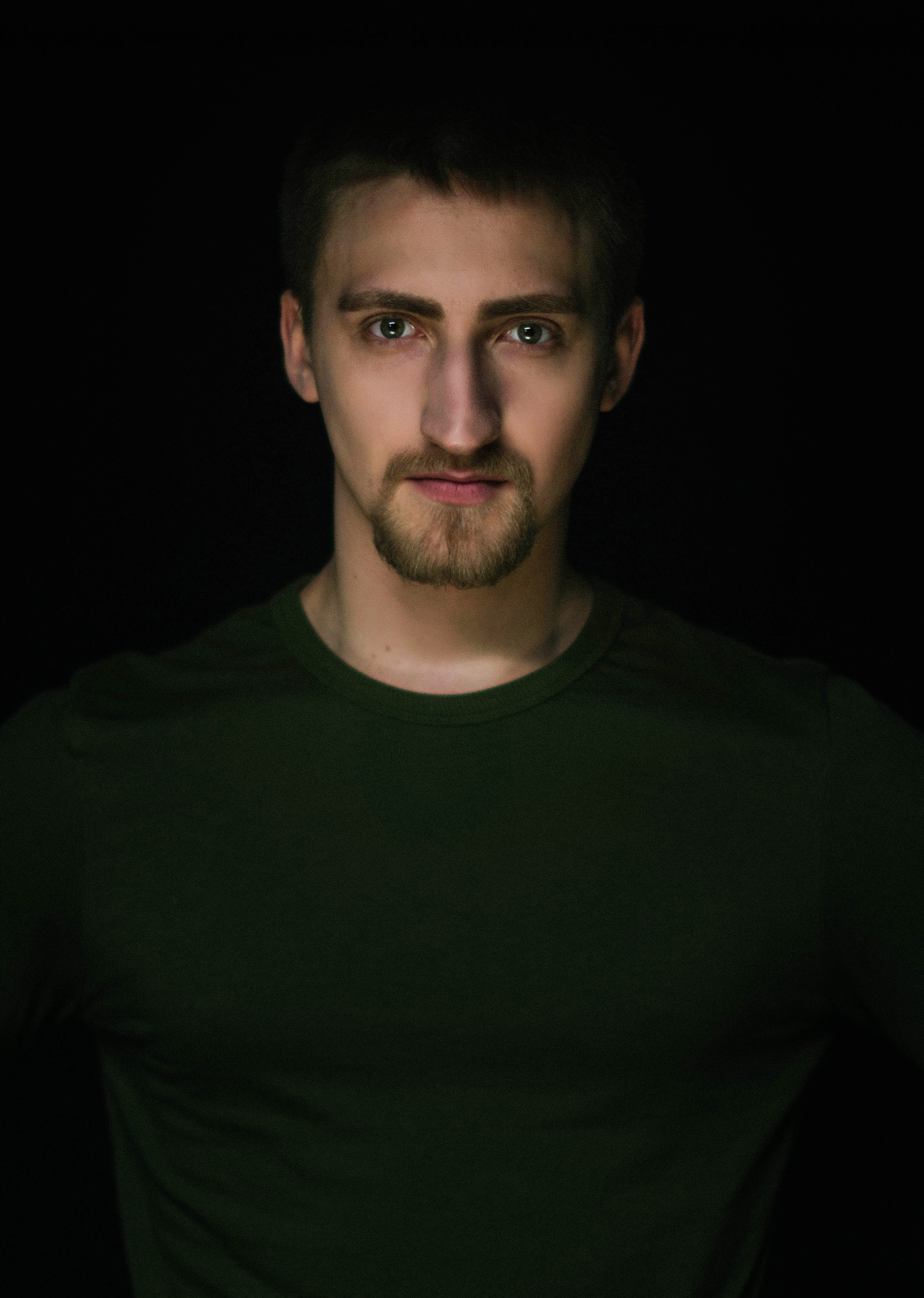
- Ustinov in November 2019
- Education: The Higher School of Performing Arts

Pavel Ustinov (Russian: Павел Устинов) (born 26 December 1995 in Krasnoyarsk Krai) is a Russian actor. He is well known for being arrested at the 2019 Moscow protests and then falsely accused of assaulting a police officer, despite videographic evidence proving his innocence. He was then sentenced to 3.5 years in prison. This has led to widespread public backlash, from teachers to priests, and has resulted in the Russian courts commuting his prison sentence and granting him parole.

== Biography ==
Ustinov moved to Moscow after attending school. He graduated in 2017 from Konstantin Raikin's The Higher School of Performing Arts. After graduation, he served with the Russian National Guard and policed the 2018 FIFA World Cup.

He has starred in the television series Morozov and has come to star in Fyodor Bondarchuk's film Attraction (2017).

== 2019 Moscow protests ==
Ustinov was standing at Pushkin Square in August 2019 as he was surrounded and beaten by riot police amidst the 2019 Moscow protests. The protests were held in response to the rejection of many independent candidates by the Moscow City Election Commission (MCEC) in the 2019 election at Moscow City Duma and were the largest held in Russia after the 2011–2013 Russian protests. He was arrested and held on numerous charges in relation to the mass protests. The Tverskoy District Court found him guilty of dislocating a riot police's shoulder and sentenced him to 3.5 years in prison. However, the court did not review the videos showing Ustinov not participating in the protests nor attacking the police.

This ruling rallied a massive backlash from the public, including the city's theatre community, entertainment industry professionals, and the Russian Orthodox Church. The protest campaign to the ruling included director Andrey Zvyagintsev, former presidential candidate Ksenia Sobchak, and actors Danila Kozlovsky, Sergey Bezrukov, Maksim Vitorgan and Yelizaveta Boyarskaya. Actor Konstantin Raikin of the Satirikon Theater called it a "misunderstanding that could have a tragic end." The Memorial human rights group declared Ustinov a political prisoner.

On 18 September 2019 a queue to picket was held outside the Presidential Administration Office. In Russia, only a single person can demonstrate without prior permission.

On 20 September 2019 Ustinov was released pending trial, citing his previous military service and personal recommendation from Konstantin Raikin. The prosecutors also changed their stance amidst escalating protests, saying that while they do not dispute Ustinov's guiltiness, they admit that the sentence is too harsh. They had originally asked for six years of prison time. The court also agreed to review video at the later trial.

His case was later commuted to a one-year suspended sentence, granting him parole, by an appeal court.
