= City Day =

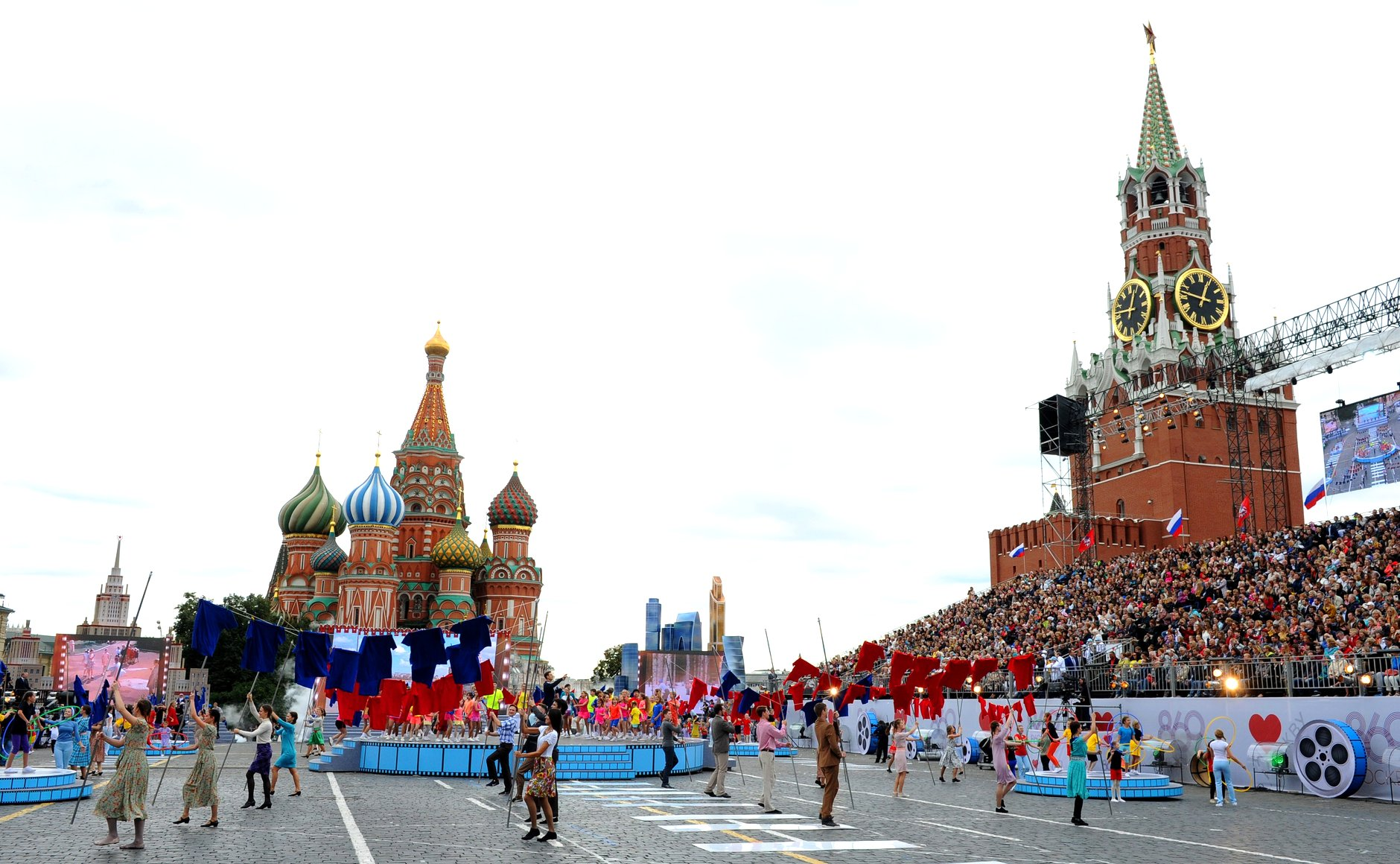
Moscow City Day celebrations, Red Square

A City Day (Russian: День города, romanized: Den' goroda) is a type of annual festival celebrated in several cities in Russia and other countries of the former Soviet Union. The date varies from city to city, but it is often celebrated on a weekend. For example, Moscow City Day is typically celebrated on the first or second Saturday in September. City Day celebrations often include concerts, parades, fireworks, and other festive events.

== List of selected City Days in Russia ==
- Moscow - first or second Saturday in September
- Nizhny Novgorod - third Saturday in August
- Saint Petersburg - 27 May
- Samara - second Sunday in September

== See also ==
- Public holidays in Russia
