= Moscow City Day =

City-wide holiday held in Moscow, Russia

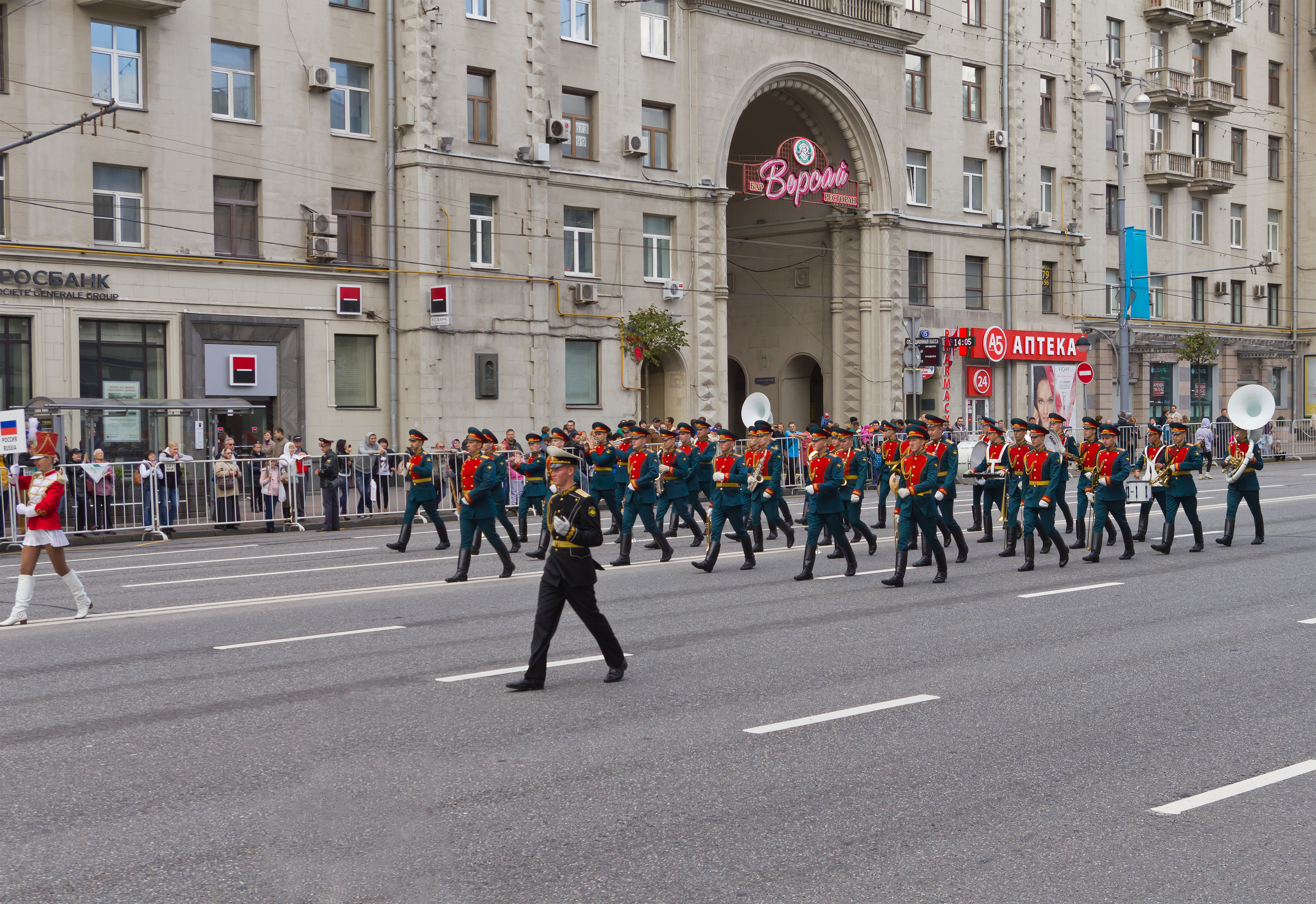
- The Special Exemplary Military Band of the Guard of Honor Battalion of Russia during the parade on Tverskaya Street.
- Official name: День города Москвы
- Also called: Moscow Day; Day of Moscow
- Observed by: Russia; Moscow
- Type: Local
- Significance: City day, created to celebrate first mention of Moscow in 1147
- Celebrations: Parades throughout the city, Fireworks
- Date: First or second Saturday of September
- Frequency: annual

Moscow City Day (Russian: День города Москвы, romanized: Den' goroda Moskvy) is a city-wide holiday held in Moscow. It is celebrated on the first or second Saturday of September. The celebration involves free cultural events, a parade and evening fireworks. The first city day was held in 1847 to celebrate Moscow's 700th anniversary.

== History ==
The first city day was held on January 1, 1847, celebrating Moscow's 700th anniversary. At the end of prayers held in the Chudov Monastery, the bells in the Ivan the Great Bell Tower sounded. The city celebrated its 800th anniversary in 1947, this time during Soviet rule. According to a mandate of the Supreme Soviet of the Soviet Union, a special medal was awarded to almost 1.7 million Soviet citizens. In 1997, the 850th anniversary of Moscow was celebrated. Moscow Day was introduced as an annual event in 1986 by future-President Boris Yeltsin, who served as Secretary of the Moscow City Committee at the time.

== Celebrations ==
About 1,000 different events and activities are held during the holiday, including parades, fairs, street entertainment, sports contests, and live music concerts. 67 Moscow museums offer free admission. Over 170 free walking and bicycle tours are organised.

=== Parade ===
The celebrations begin with a procession along Tverskaya Street and finishes at the Kremlin.

=== Concerts ===
Evening concerts usually take place in large areas such as Red Square, Cathedral Square and Manezhnaya Square. Classical music concerts are also held at city parks such as Kolomenskoye, Tsaritsyno and Sokolniki. The Patriarch Ponds annually hosts a unique concert-on-water. Concerts range from rising independent artists to international performers and urban classical orchestras.

=== Mass event ===
A traditional mass event is held at Luzhniki Stadium in the Khamovniki District. The event features amusement rides, games and competitions. The main stage opposite the central entrance features famous singers, while the car park by the South Sport Complex provides a venue for a rap music concert.

=== Other ===
Due to the COVID-19 pandemic in Russia, the 2020 celebrations were reduced to a singular ceremony attended by President Putin in the Zaryadye Park Concert Hall.

== Gallery ==
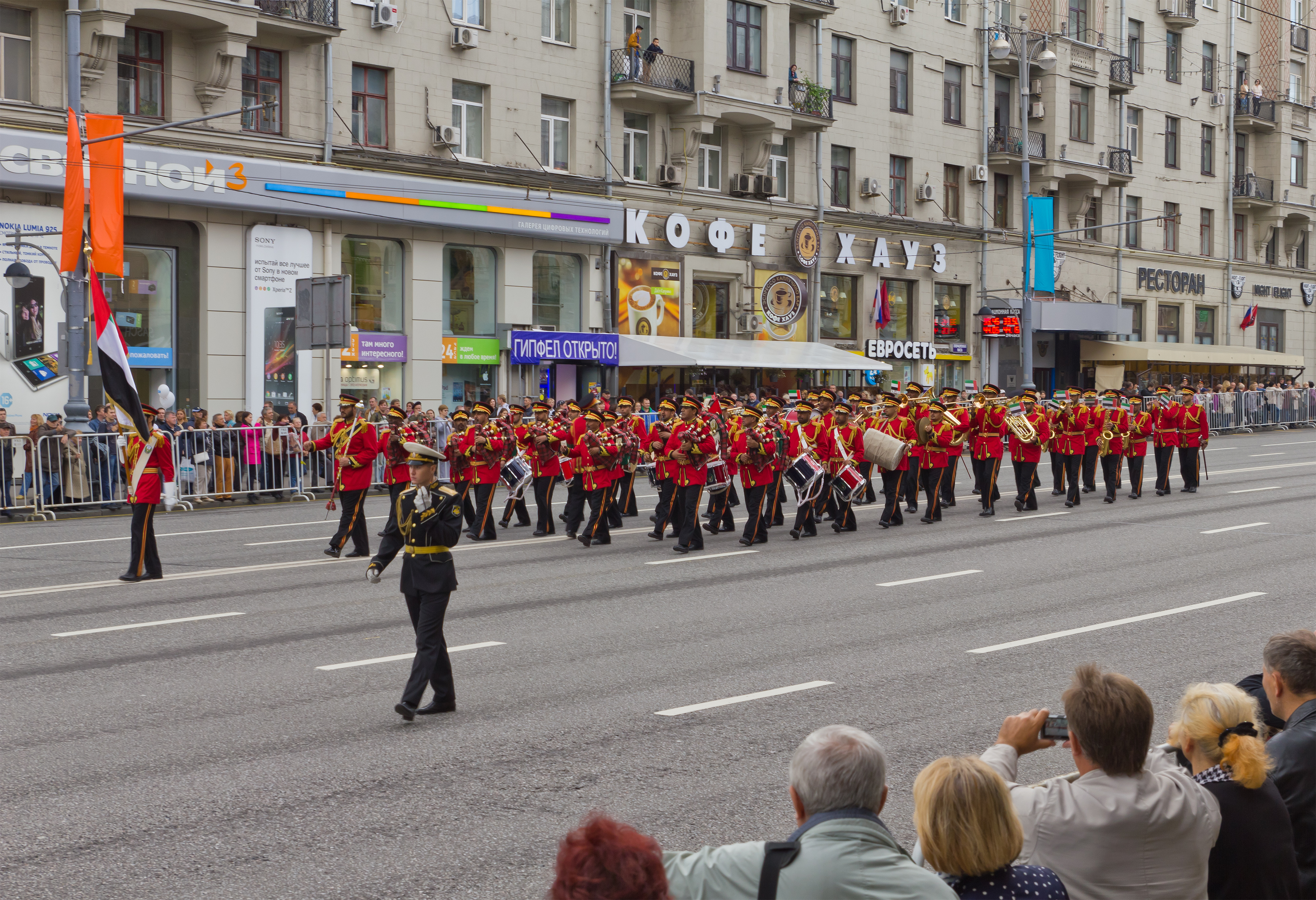

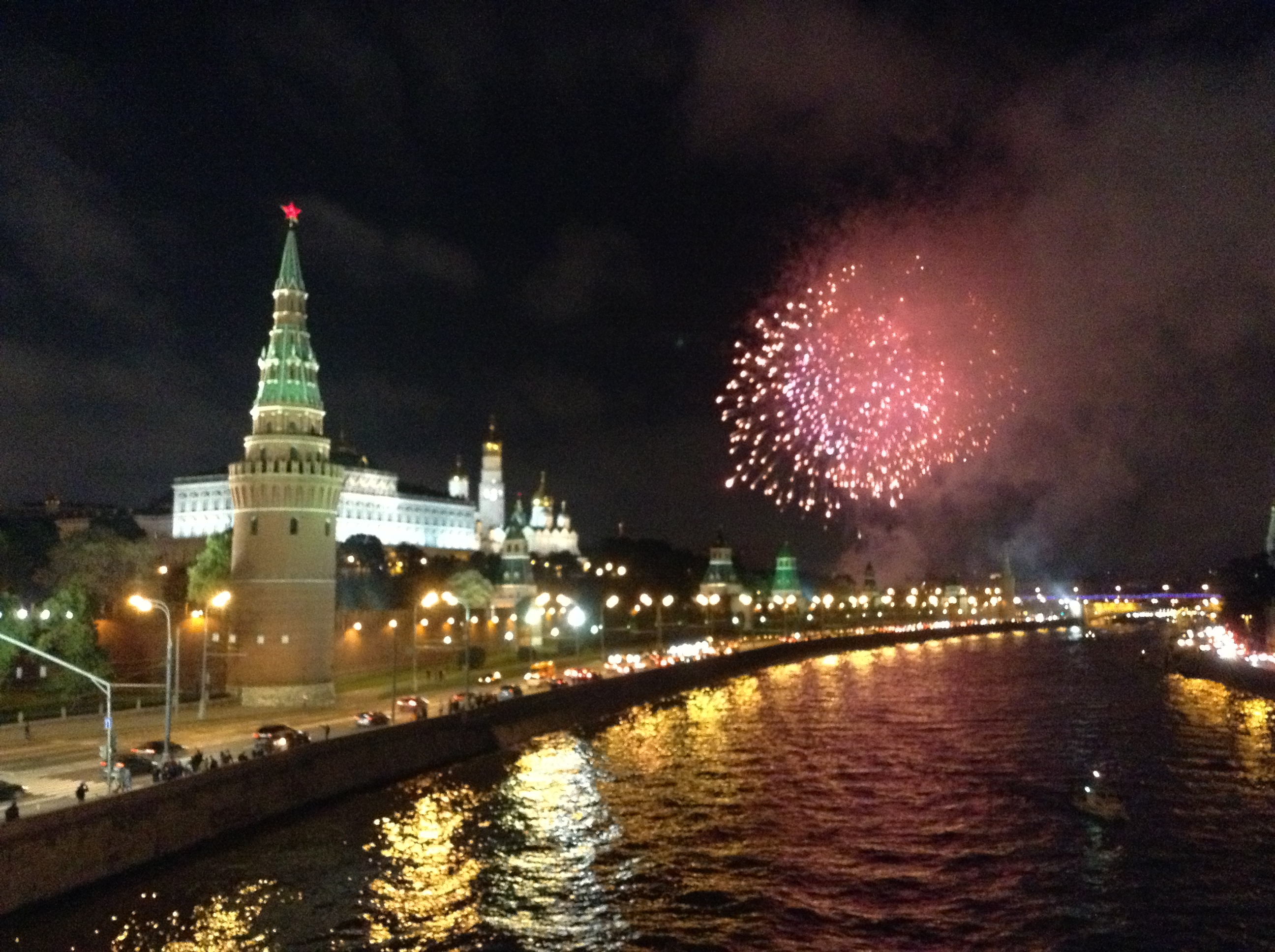

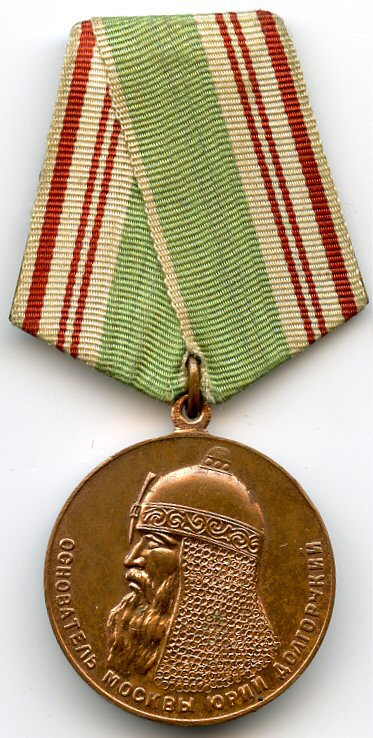

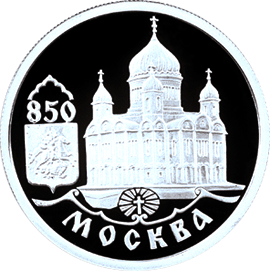

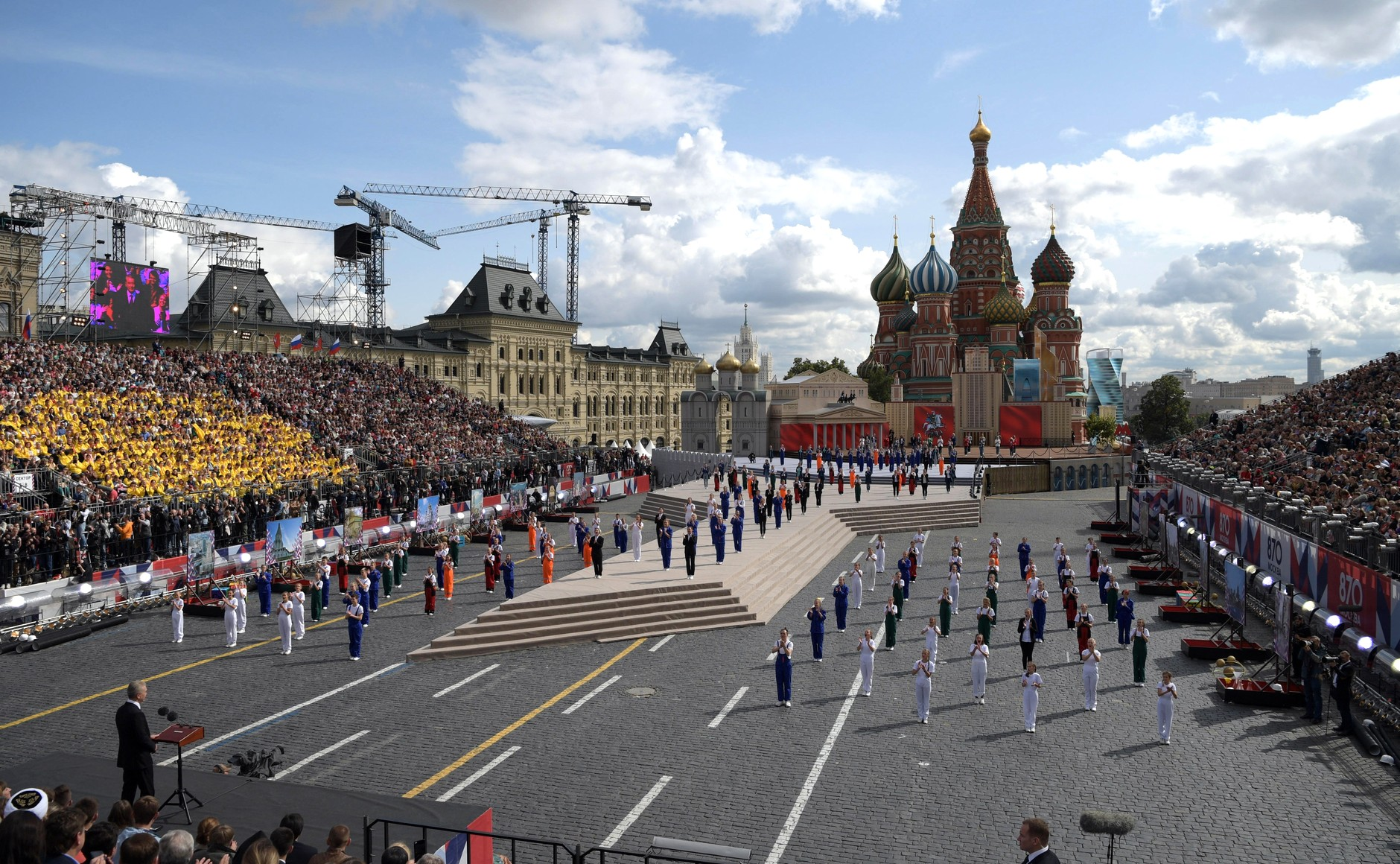

== See also ==
- Public holidays in Russia
- Moscow
- Defender of the Fatherland Day
- Victory Day (9 May)
- Russia Day
- Red Square
- Spasskaya Tower Military Music Festival and Tattoo
- Moscow's 850th Anniversary Pageant
