= Yegor Zhukov =

Russian activist (born 1998)

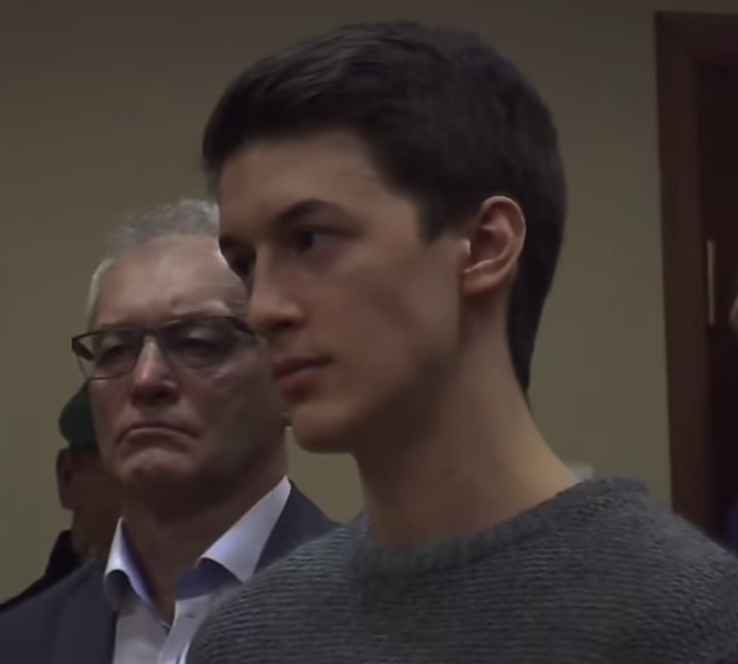
- Egor Zhukov in court hearing, December 6, 2019
- Born: 28 July 1998 (age 28); Moscow, Russia
- Occupations: Student, radio host, Political blogger

Yegor Sergeyevich Zhukov (Russian: Егор Сергеевич Жуков; born 28 July 1998) is a Russian radio host, blogger and politician.

== Biography ==
Born on 28 July 1998, Zhukov is a student and tutor at the Higher School of Economics. He prepares his students for subject Olympiads. Zhukov is described as a libertarian.

Created his YouTube blog on June 6, 2017 as part of the contest of Alexei Navalny.

On 14 February 2019, he announced his candidacy for the elections to the Moscow City Duma 2019. On 30 June, he announced the removal of his candidacy.

During the 2019 Moscow protests he became "Moscow's New Face Of Dissent" for his YouTube videos in support of protestors and their cause against corrupt Russian elections and criticizing police actions during rallies. On 2 August 2019, he was arrested and charged with rioting during an unauthorized rally in Moscow.

On 6 December, he was sentenced to three years' probation – lighter than expected – following widespread public support for him. Before sentencing he made a statement about responsibility and love in Russian society, contrasting these ideals with the Russian government's autocracy and dehumanization of its citizens. Rapper Oxxxymiron offered to pay his bail.

After his release, Zhukov gained a job as a radio host on the Echo of Moscow radio station. He interviews such Russian figures as Alexey Navalny, Vladimir Zhirinovsky, Natalya Poklonskaya, Leonid Parfyonov, Mikhail Svetov, Maxim Katz and others.

On 30 August 2020, Zhukov was beaten up and taken to a hospital. Zhukov and his attorney linked the assault with his political activity.

Since then, Yegor Zhukov has not appeared in public, his social networks are not updated.

At the end of 2024 it became known that Yegor Zhukov emigrated to the USA and is studying at Syracuse University. He plans to connect his future with the United States rather than the Russian Federation.
