= Moscow's 850th Anniversary Pageant =

Moscow's 850th Anniversary Pageant; Saint George, The Bell and The Dragon, opened Moscow's week-long anniversary celebrations on 5 September 1997. It was staged in Red Square in front of St Basil's Cathedral and was broadcast live throughout Russia and the Commonwealth of Independent States (CIS) countries and in major broadcast markets elsewhere.

The pageant featured a cast of a thousand (plus horses), with Russian classical, choral and folk music as well as dance. Large-scale graphics were used to depict scenes from Moscow's past.

== History ==
The event was commissioned by the mayor of Moscow, Yuri Luzhkov, with the British producer and impresario Tony Hollingsworth being brought in to executive-produce the show. The creative director was Andrei Konchalovsky, the renowned Russian film director. The show was watched by a specially-invited live audience of 6,000.

The Russian and CIS television sales were handled by Luzhkov, owner of the Russian channel Central TV. Hollingsworth received 50 per cent of his fee from the City of Moscow, with the rest coming from television sales to other countries.

Rights in the event are held by Tribute Inspirations Limited.

== Artists ==
- Evgeny Kissin
- Makvala Kasrashvili
- Pelageya Khanova
- Stanislav Varki
- Valery Gergiev
- Yuri Bashmet
- Chamber of Moscow Soloists
- Choral Academy of TV and Radio
- State Academy of Classical Ballet
- Russian National Orchestra
- Joint Chorus Academy of Choral Art and Ostkano TV Children's Choir
- State Academy Kuban Cossack Choir

=== Folk bands ===
- Velikorossi
- Dmitry Pok
- Russichi
- Nerekhtshiye Rozhechniki

=== Military bands ===
- Red Army Band
- Military Folk Band of Moscow Region
- Military Folk Band of Alexandrov
- Military Historical Association of Russia and CIS
- Acrobatic Circus Troupe Russhichi
- Ali Bek Horses
