= Andrei Babushkin =

Russian sociologist and human rights activist (1964–2022)

- Андрей Бабушкин
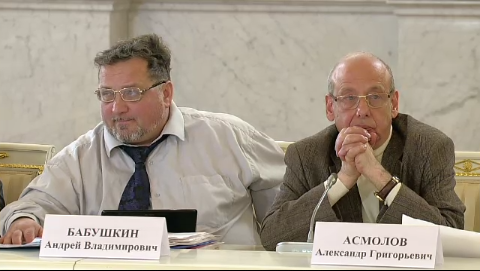
- Babushkin (left) in 2018

Member of the Presidential Council for Civil Society and Human Rights
- In office 12 November 2012 – 14 May 2022

Personal details
- Born: Andrei Vladimirovich Babushkin; 28 January 1964 Zyvagino, Moscow Oblast, Russian SFSR, Soviet Union
- Died: 14 May 2022 (aged 58) Moscow, Russia
- Party: Yabloko
- Education: Moscow State University
- Occupation: Sociologist; Human rights activist

Andrei Vladimirovich Babushkin (Russian: Андре́й Влади́мирович Ба́бушкин; 28 January 1964 – 14 May 2022) was a Russian sociologist and human rights activist. A member of Yabloko, he served on the Presidential Council for Civil Society and Human Rights from 2012 to 2022. He died of pancreatitis in Moscow on 14 May 2022 at the age of 58.
