= Oyub Titiev =

Russian human rights activist (born 1957)

- Оюб Титиев
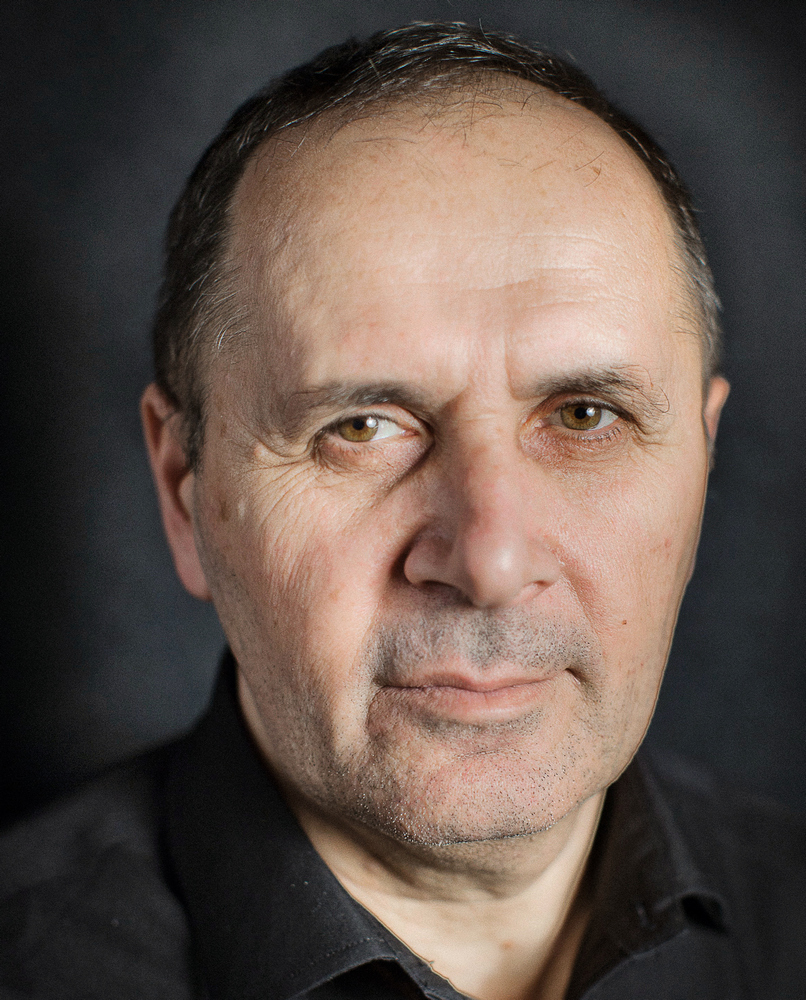
- Born: Oyub Salmanovich Titiev; 24 August 1957 (age 67); Lebedinovka, Kyrgyz SSR, Soviet Union
- Occupation(s): Activist, head of Memorial in Grozny, Chechnya

Oyub Salmanovich Titiev (Russian: Оюб Салманович Титиев; born 24 August 1957) is a Russian human rights activist and the head of Memorial's Grozny, Chechnya office. In 2018 he was arrested on politically motivated charges, sparking an international campaign by human rights groups calling for his release. On October 8, 2018, Titiev was awarded the Václav Havel Human Rights Prize, which honours "outstanding" defence of human rights in Europe and beyond.

== Biography ==
Oyub Titiev's ancestors were among the first settlers of the village of Kurchaloi, Chechnya. However, as a result of the deportation of Chechens in March 1944 he was born in the village of Lebedinovka in the Kyrgyz SSR. He later returned to Kurchaloi, Chechnya. Active in wrestling and weightlifting, Titiev became a physical education teacher and created a local children's sports club, which has produced a number of professional athletes.

Since 2000, he has worked for Memorial and the Civic Assistance Committee, documenting human rights abuses in Chechnya and overseeing humanitarian projects such as assisting schools in Chechnya's mountain regions or defending Muslims from discrimination in the criminal justice system. After the assassination of Natalya Estemirova in 2009, he became the head of Memorial in Chechnya.

== Arrest, detention and criminal case ==
On January 9, 2018, Titiev left Kurchaloi, traveling towards Mairtup, Chechnya, where he was supposed to meet a friend at 9:00 am. According to the official version, his Lada Kalina was stopped to verify his documents. Upon inspecting the car, the police officers found “a polymer bag with a substance of plant origin with the specific smell of marijuana, weighing approximately 180 grams.” Titiev was then detained and taken to the Kurchaloevsky police station for medical examination, while the packet with the substance was sent for expert analysis. That same day, Memorial reported his detention.

On January 11, 2018, the Shalinsk city court arrested Titiev until March 9 at the request of the investigator. The human rights activist was accused of breaking Part 2 Article 228 of the Criminal Code (the illegal acquisition, storage, and transportation of drugs). Titiev denied guilt and in a statement sent to the Investigatory Committee of the Chechen Republic accused the police officers of planting the illegal drugs under his passenger's seat while inspecting his car. On January 12, his defense appealed the two-month arrest.

Memorial representative Aleksandr Cherkasov said that Titiev's arrest was related to his professional work which was “met with disapproval from Chechen authorities.” The representative of the Presidential Council for Civil Society and Human Rights, Mikhail Fedotov, said that the council had already appealed to the Ministry of Internal Affairs on January 10 to verify Titiev's detention and investigate the situation.

On January 24, Aleksandr Cherkasov appealed to the Russian and international community on behalf of Memorial, urging them to closely monitor Titiev's case as they had with criminal proceedings against historian and head of the Karelian branch of Memorial, Yury A. Dmitriev. On January 28, Ksenia Sobchak, then a candidate in the March 2018 Russian Presidential Elections, held a one-night-long picket in Grozny in “memory of journalists who died for a free country” with a poster reading "Freedom for Oyub Titiev".

On February 1, the High Commissioner for Human Rights in Russia, Tatyana Moskalkova called for the investigation of the Titiev case to be passed on to the federal level. A similar opinion was expressed by the representative of the Presidential Council for Civil Society and Human Rights, Mikhail Fedotov.

On March 6, the Staropromyslov district court extended Titiev's arrest until May 9, while rejecting what he received from presidential candidates Grigory Yavlinsky and Ksenia Sobchak.

On May 4, while considering an appeal to the ruling of the Staropromyslov district court, human rights activist Svetlana Gannushkina and test pilot and Hero of Russia Sergey Nefedov also offered a poruchitelstvo for Titiev, which the court also rejected.

A number of leading international human rights organizations, including Human Rights Watch, Amnesty International, Front Line Defenders, FIDH, the World Organization Against Torture) released a joint statement on January 11, defending Titiev and Memorial's activities in the Caucasus. On February 8, the European Parliament adopted a resolution on Titiev's case calling for the "immediate release of the Director of the Memorial Human Rights Centre in the Chechen Republic, Mr. Oyub Titiev". Memorial has included Titiev in their list of political prisoners.

In March 2019 Titiev was sentenced to 4 years of corrective labor, in a colony of an open type, which allows for conditional release after one third of the time has been served, including time spent in arrest. This was interpreted by human rights activists as "actual release" by the court without admitting that the charges were fabricated, at the same time giving a clear signal to the human rights community in Russia that their work is strictly controlled and will face repressions if going against the government's interests.

He was ordered to be released in June 2019, after having served more than a third of his sentence in jail.
