= Lyubov Sobol =

Russian political and public figure, lawyer (born 1987)

- Любовь Соболь
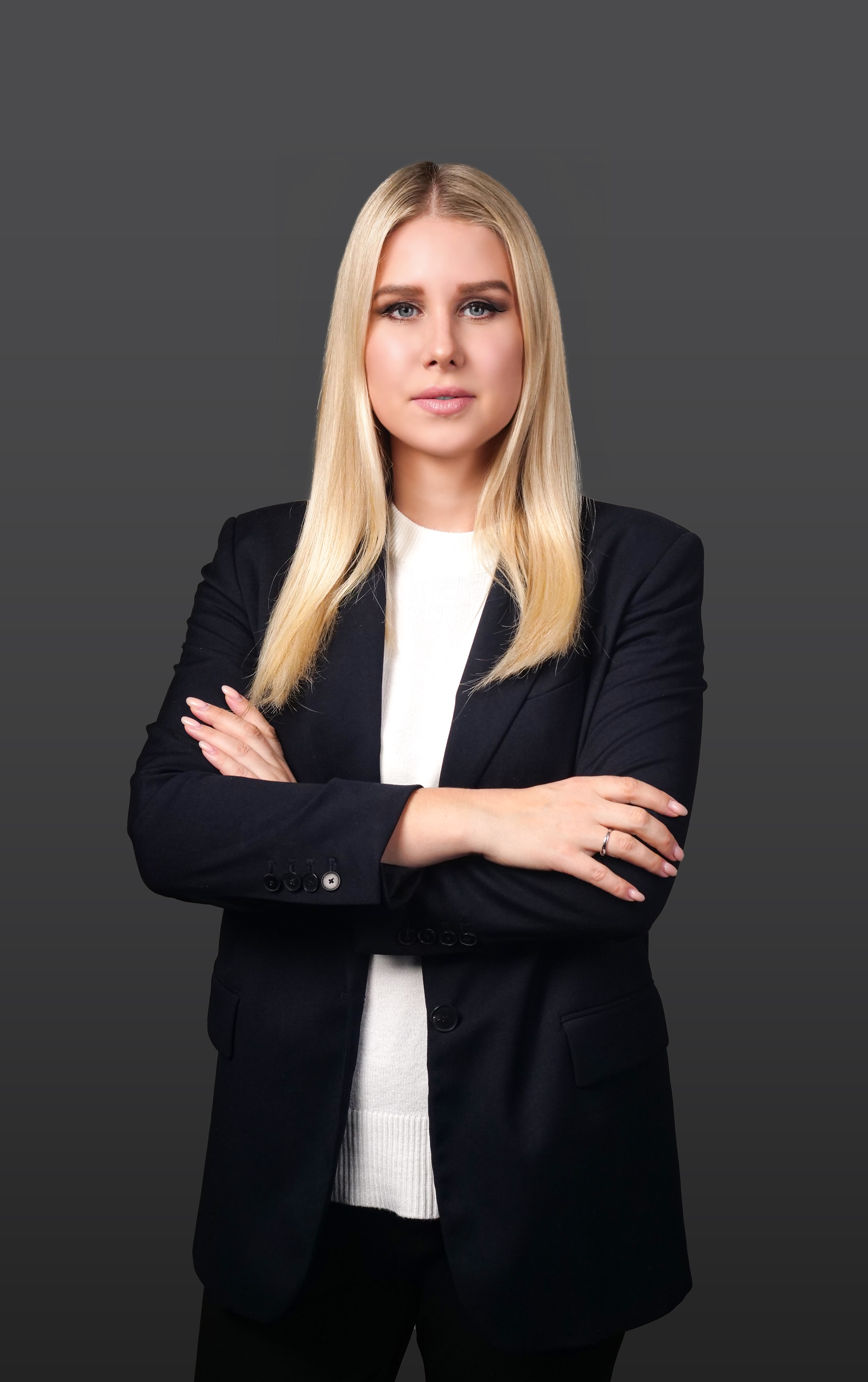
- Sobol in 2023

Personal details
- Born: Lyubov Eduardovna Fedenyova; 13 September 1987 (age 39) Lobnya, Russian SFSR, Soviet Union
- Party: Russia of the Future
- Education: State Law Academy; Moscow State University
- Occupation: Lawyer, politician
- Awards: BBC 100 Women (2019)
- Website: Her YouTube channel

Lyubov Eduardovna Sobol (Russian: Любовь Эдуардовна Соболь, née Fedenyova, Феденёва; born 13 September 1987) is a Russian opposition politician, lawyer and a member of the Russian Opposition Coordination Council (2012–2013). She produces the YouTube channel "Navalny Live" of Alexei Navalny. Sobol was a lawyer of the Anti-Corruption Foundation until it was designated as an "extremist organization" by the Putin government in 2021.

== Early life and education ==
Sobol was born on 13 September 1987 in Lobnya, Moscow Oblast, Russian SFSR. In 2004, she graduated from the gymnasium class of a secondary school with a silver medal, and entered the Institute of Jurisprudence of the State Law Academy in Moscow. In parallel with her studies, she worked in the Presnensky District Court of Moscow as secretary of the court session and as an assistant to the judge. In 2006, she entered the Law Faculty of the Moscow State University graduating with honours in 2011.

== Politics and activism ==
In 2011 and 2012, she took part in various forms of civil-political activities, in opposition rallies, volunteer movement in Astrakhan and assistance to Krymsk, she was an observer at various levels of elections. Since March 2011, she has been a lawyer of the RosPil Project created by Alexei Navalny to fight corruption in the area of budget spending.

That same year, Forbes Russian language edition awarded Lyubov Sobol seventh place in their 2011 ranking of "faces few know", recognising the year's most influential but still relatively unknown personalities. On 22 October 2012, she was elected on the civil list to the Russian Opposition Coordination Council, receiving 25,270 votes on the civil list and taking the fifteenth place, ahead of such famous politicians as Boris Nemtsov and Sergey Udaltsov.

In March 2016, she announced her intention to run for election to the 7th convocation of the State Duma in the fall of 2016 from the majority district in the Central Administrative District of Moscow. On 24 May, she withdrew her candidacy.

In May 2018, she became a member of the Central Council of Alexei Navalny's political party Russia of the Future. In 2019, she again took part in the campaign for the election to the Moscow City Duma. On 2 September, she was detained by police after a protest on the weekend in Moscow.

She was included in the Leadership category by the BBC on its 2019 list of 100 inspiring and influential women from around the world.

On 21 December 2020, Sobol went to knock on the door of alleged FSB agent Konstantin Kudryavtsev (who had recently provided details about the poisoning of Alexei Navalny) but was detained by police for more than six hours. On 25 December 2020, Russian authorities raided Sobol's home, detained her, and opened a criminal investigation, alleging she had made an unlawful threat. Sobol has denied the charges. If convicted, Sobol could face two to five years in prison.

On 23 January 2021 during a protest in Moscow opposing the arrest of Navalny, Sobol was grabbed and pulled away from an interview with reporters by multiple police officers. On 3 August 2021, she was convicted of COVID-19 restrictions violations and sentenced to one year and a half of parole-like restrictions. Sobol calls the convictions as politically-motivated and nonsensical. The Russian police put out an arrest warrant for Sobol in October 2021.

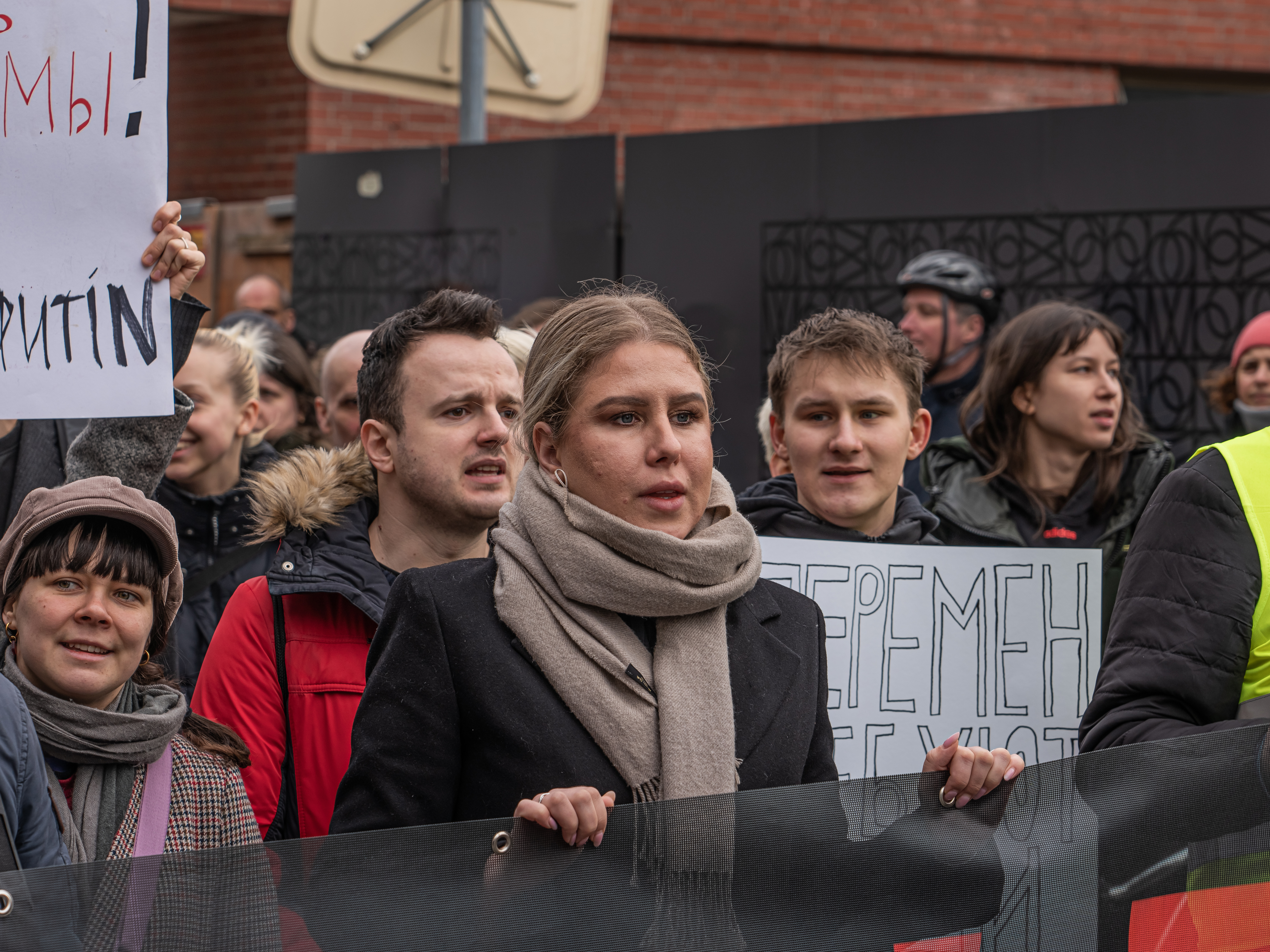
Lyubov Sobol among participants of a protest rally at the Embassy of Russia, Berlin, 18 February 2024

Sobol released a statement on Alexei Navalny's death, reported on 16 February 2024, reminding the public that Navalny had been healthy prior to his 2020 poisoning, and that he had recovered his health in Germany prior to his arrest and confinement. She concluded that "we need Putin's regime to come to an end, and we should not be afraid to say this publicly."

Shortly after Navalny's death, Sobol took part in Pussy Riot protest outside of the Russian Embassy in Berlin, along with Marina Ovsyannikova and Pussy Riot members Nadya Tolokonnikova and Lucy Shtein.

In 2026, Sobol was selected to be a participant in the PACE Platform for Dialogue with Russian Democratic Forces. The platform met in Strasbourg for its first session in January 2026.

== Personal life ==
On 8 August 2021, Sobol announced that she had divorced her husband. On the same day, Russian media outlets reported that she had left Russia, having taken a flight from Moscow’s Vnukovo Airport to Turkey.

Over May and June 2023, Sobol made a number of strange and out-of-character posts on Twitter. Colleague and fellow opposition figure Maria Pevchikh commented that she was “shocked by the situation” and that Sobol had “serious mental problems”.

== Honors and awards ==
In 2011, Forbes named Sobol among the “Main Heroes of the Year Whose Faces Few People Know,” noting her role as the first full-time lawyer for the public anti-corruption project Rospil.

In 2019, the BBC included Sobol in its annual list of the world’s 100 most influential women, citing her anti-corruption investigations and her exclusion from the Moscow City Duma elections.

That same year, she ranked 7th overall in Yandex’s annual list of the most popular search queries, making her the most searched Russian in the ranking.

Sobol was named a George F. Kennan Scholar by the Kennan Institute, a part of the Washington D.C.–based Wilson Center, for 2024.
