= Elf Farm =

Political organization managed by Free Russia Foundation

Elf Farm (also Legion of Elves or "Elven Factory") is a project created by the Strategic Communications Center of the Free Russia Foundation under the leadership of Egor Kuroptev and Anton Mikhalchuk, named by analogy with Yevgeny Prigozhin's pro-Kremlin "Troll Factory". As part of the project, a network of hired commentators, for a fee, spread "anti-Kremlin/anti-Russian propaganda" from fake accounts on social networks, the main platform used was the social network VKontakte. The "productivity" of the factory was 160 thousand comments per month.

== History ==
In October 2022, the publications "Вот Так" (Sota Vision) and "Fontanka.ru" wrote about the "Elven Factory". "Fontanka.ru" reported on the launch in Tbilisi of a "reverse troll factory", where opposition journalists and activists who were forced to leave Russia worked.

The existence of the "Elf Bot Farm" received wide publicity after the publication on Mikhail Svetov's channel "SVTV" on November 15, 2023, based on data from one of the former employees of the bot farm. This employee provided the SVTV channel with an archive of internal correspondence and documentation of the organization.

The SVTV material claims that the Free Russia Foundation (English: Free Russia Foundation, FRF), an international organization founded in 2014 that supports civil society and democratic development in Russia, is funding the network of fake accounts. The foundation is headquartered in Washington and has regional offices in various cities. According to SVTV, several key figures were allegedly involved in the creation of the bot farm, including Natalia Arno, head of the foundation, as well as other high-ranking members of the Free Russia Foundation. The head of the "bot factory" is allegedly Oleg Stepanov, the former head of Alexei Navalny's Moscow headquarters. Other alleged participants include Egor Kuroptev, Vladimir Milov, Anton Mikhalchuk, Pavel Elizarov, Fedor Telin, and Ivan Zhdanov.

According to SVTV, the bot farm employees are called "elves" as opposed to Prigozhin's "troll factory". They allegedly enter into contracts for the provision of "SMM consulting" services with the Lithuanian organization Reforum, headed by Natalia Arno. The article also claims that bot farm employees receive a salary of 10 euros per hour, and, depending on their performance, can earn from 1,200 to 1,800 euros per month. The authors of the material also claim that from 2.88 to 4.32 million euros are allocated annually for the salaries of bot farm employees alone. There are three offices in Vilnius with 25 people each, and another 70 "elves" in Tbilisi. The organization also has a division of about 50 people engaged in opposition counter-propaganda in the Republic of Belarus. The duty of an "elf" includes publishing at least 120 posts or comments per work shift, with screenshots for reporting. Bot farm employees use fake accounts on "VKontakte", obtained through phishing attacks or purchased on the black market.

The most resonant part of this text is the accusations of involvement in the farm of the Anti-Corruption Foundation and associates of Alexei Navalny. The existence of guidelines on attacking "FBK competitors" is fully confirmed only in the case of Ksenia Sobchak. The published archive of the farm contains documents on how to write comments about her, and in the screenshots of the comments themselves, Mediazona found 56 negative mentions of Sobchak. SVTV wrote that the farm was engaged in attacks on Alexey Venediktov and Maxim Katz, and also supported Leonid Volkov during the scandal with the support of Mikhail Fridman. In the comments, screenshots of which are published in the archive, mentions of these people are isolated (no more than four for each). The text on SVTV states that screenshots of such comments could have been deleted.

On November 17, the Free Russia Foundation confirmed the creation of the Legion of Elves project, which was nicknamed the "Elven Factory" in the media, in response to the Russian invasion of Ukraine. Egor Kuroptev, Director of the FRF Center for Strategic Communications, spoke about this in an interview with The Insider. He noted that the "Legion of Elves" has become a significant counter-propaganda project in a short period of time, becoming perhaps the largest in this area. The goal of the "Legion of Elves," according to Kuroptev, is to end the war and provide Russians with an alternative point of view, independent of the official Russian authorities and the Kremlin. Kuroptev explained that the project aims to create a picture of the world based on objective information, providing different points of view on events. Anton Mikhalchuk, coordinator of the Legion of Elves, stressed that the social network "VKontakte" is one of the best platforms for disseminating the project's narrative.

The principle of the "elves" is to attract neutral citizens to support, reorient radically minded individuals to positions of neutrality, and ignore completely radical ones. According to The Insider, dozens of activists from around the world are involved in the project, most of whom have experience in opposition activities in Russia or have worked in the media. Nina Aleksa, another project coordinator, clarified that the "Legion of Elves" has about a hundred members. The project is active in 900 pro-government communities on social networks, leaving about 160,000 comments every month criticizing the actions of the Russian authorities, including laws and military actions in Ukraine. Over the year and eight months, activists have written more than 2.3 million comments, the publication reports.

SVTV previously reported that the Free Russia Foundation was involved in funding the "Elven Factory". The authors of the SVTV material claimed that the network of paid commentators engaged in anti-Kremlin propaganda on the Internet belongs to the Anti-Corruption Foundation of Alexei Navalny. In addition, SVTV claims that the "elf bots" are also directing their criticism towards people with opposition views with whom FBK is in conflict. As an example, the publication cites a document containing instructions for criticizing Ksenia Sobchak. Alexey Venediktov and Maxim Katz could also have been attacked by "elves". FBK denies any involvement in the bot farm.

== Assessments and Comments ==
Investigative journalist Andrei Zakharov said that he had analyzed the documents published by SVTV and noted that such a volume of reporting would be difficult to forge. At the same time, he pointed out that the claim that the project is connected with FBK and was created specifically for its needs is not supported by sufficient evidence. Zakharov also drew attention to the fact that SVTV's publication about the connection with FBK is based on the statements of a single source.

Egor Kuroptev, Director of the Center for Strategic Communications of the Free Russia Foundation, responding to a question from TV Rain host Anna Mongayt about whether people are paid to write comments from fake accounts, said that he would neither confirm nor deny this: “There are security issues for hundreds of people who work with us on different projects in different countries. This wave, as I understand it, was primarily directed at FBK, judging by the absolutely false information spread by Svetov's resources”.

FBK Director Ivan Zhdanov called the SVTV publication's claims about the foundation's connection to the bot farm "a complete lie": "This network has absolutely no connection with the Anti-Corruption Foundation or me personally (including ACF as the international branch of FBK). Neither in financing, nor in resolving issues, nor in anything else even close. I am ready to confirm this in court".

Politician Vladimir Milov commented on the SVTV material on the air of "Dozhd": "Everything he (Svetov) wrote about the FBK bot farm is not true. FBK has never had anything to do with this. Well, there are many other inventions. I was also mentioned, although I just heard about this project out of the corner of my ear" and "They (the Free Russia Foundation) are really leading a number of projects in the information sphere, including social networks. But the question here is that many people began to compare this with what Prigozhin was doing. Prigozhin was engaged in spreading disinformation and lies. And here we are talking about the fact that people on social networks are writing: “Look, Putin stole everything, killed everyone, brought the country to ruin.” That is, there is no lie here. It's about spreading the truth. Therefore, I do not see a problem in this aspect”.

== See also ==
- Internet Research Agency
