= PACE Platform for Dialogue with Russian Democratic Forces =

Consultative body under the Parliamentary Assembly of the Council of Europe

- Платформа диалога ПАСЕ с российскими демократическими силами
- Symbol of the Russian Democratic Forces (Note: According to Article 9 of Resolution 2621)
- Formation: January 26, 2026; 9 months ago
- Members: 15
- Affiliations: Parliamentary Assembly of the Council of Europe
- Website: https://pacerdf.com/

The PACE Platform for Dialogue with Russian Democratic Forces (Russian: Платформа диалога ПАСЕ с российскими демократическими силами) is a consultative body of the Parliamentary Assembly of the Council of Europe (PACE) that was established in January 2026 for communicating with Russian opposition representatives after Russia's expulsion from the Council of Europe in 2022 following the invasion of Ukraine. The platform includes representatives from opposition groups such as the Anti-War Committee of Russia, Free Russia Foundation and the Free Russia Forum along with numerous ethnic minority rights activists. Participants are approved by the Bureau of the Assembly upon proposals made by the President of the Assembly, currently Petra Bayr.

== History ==
After the start of the Russian invasion of Ukraine and subsequent expulsion of Russia from the Council of Europe, the Parliamentary Assembly of the Council of Europe decided to intensify its engagement with Russian and Belarusian opposition groups which supported democratic values, human rights, and the rule of law. As a result the Parliamentary Assembly passed several resolutions, including Resolution 2433 and 2540 which called for formal engagement with anti-regime activists in Russia. Resolution 2540 called for the creation of the function of the General Rapporteur on Russian democratic forces. This position was created in April 2024 with the inaugural being Estonian representative Eerik-Niiles Kross. The General Rapporteur is tasked with engaging and communicating with opposition groups and presenting his findings to the Parliamentary Assembly.

In September 2025, Kross submitted his report on Russian Democratic Forces which presented a draft resolution for the creation of the Platform for Dialogue with Russian Democratic Forces. On 2 October, PACE approved a resolution to form such a structure. The resolution defined the platform's mandate as supporting Russian democratic forces in their efforts to achieve political change in Russia and to establish peace in Ukraine.

Russian organizations involved in developing the platform's concept included the Anti-Corruption Foundation, the Free Russia Foundation, the Anti-War Committee of Russia, and the Free Russia Forum. The platform's formation took place against a backdrop of public disagreements among various opposition groups. Subsequently, the Anti-Corruption Foundation announced its withdrawal from participating in the platform's work, stating that the participant selection procedure failed to meet democratic principles due to a lack of transparency in the process.

On December 16 following a meeting between then PACE President Theodoros Roussopoulos, General Rapporteur Kross and representatives of Assembly's political groups, the Parliamentary Assembly formally decided to open submissions for representatives to the Platform. Several opposition groups, such as the Anti-War Committee of Russia and Congress of People's Deputies publicly submitted lists of nominees.

On January 26, 2026 the PACE Bureau approved the platform's final composition and published a full list of opposition figures invited to participate, including Garry Kasparov, Vladimir Kara-Murza and Mikhail Khodorkovsky and other opposition activists. The Platform held its inaugural meeting on the 29th of January in Strasbourg.

At the start of the spring PACE plenary session on April 20, 2026 representatives from the Free Russia Forum published the "Strasbourg Declaration of the Citizens of a New Russia". This declaration is intended to "declare complete political and moral break with the Putin state, its criminal war, and its imperialist ideology." On April 23, 2026, the platform held its second meeting. Among the topics discussed were problems related to the issuance and renewal of passports and other forms of identity documents that Russians in exile face. The proposed solutions were largely based on a report titled "Alternatives to the Nansen Passport" published by the Center for Analysis and Strategies in Europe (CASE), which outlined an approach based on the utilization of refugee travel documents for exiled Russians and Belarusians.

== Legal state and powers ==
The Platform for Dialogue with Russian Democratic Forces does not hold the status of an official delegation and does not possess the powers that the Russian delegation had before 2022. Platform participants do not have the right to vote on PACE resolutions.

In accordance with the PACE resolution, members of the platform may attend meetings of the Assembly's committees and sub-committees, participate in session events, and be granted the floor to speak upon approval by the PACE President.

The platform is presided over by the president of PACE. Its composition is subject to annual renewal. The selection of candidates was carried out by the PACE secretariat.

=== Symbol ===
According to Article 9 of Resolution 2621 participants of the Platform shall not use, display or reproduce State symbols of the Russian Federation, including its flag, coat of arms, anthem or other official insignia, at the Assembly's premises or events. The white-blue-white colours are recognised by the Russian democratic forces as a symbol of resistance.

== Selection criteria ==
When forming the platform's composition, PACE was guided by a set of requirements established in its resolution. It was declared that candidates must be of high moral standing and reside outside Russia.

Activists and public figures engaged in countering the Putin regime were eligible to become platform participants. They were required to recognize the sovereignty, independence, and territorial integrity of Ukraine within its internationally recognized borders, as well as the sovereignty of Moldova, Georgia, and other states. Candidates' backgrounds were to be free of any episodes involving support for Russia's undemocratic or imperialistic foreign policy towards sovereign states, or justification of international crimes.

One of the selection criteria was having signed the Declaration of Russian Democratic Forces (also known as the "Berlin Declaration"), adopted by Russian opposition figures on 30 April 2023 in Berlin, Germany. The declaration places responsibility for the war in Ukraine on Russia and recognizes Crimea as Ukrainian territory. The declaration was prepared on the initiative of Mikhail Khodorkovsky and other opposition figures.

The resolution stipulated that one third of the platform's seats be allocated for representatives of Russia's indigenous peoples and national minorities. According to the PACE, this quota corresponds to the proportion of indigenous peoples within Russia's total population.

== Participants ==
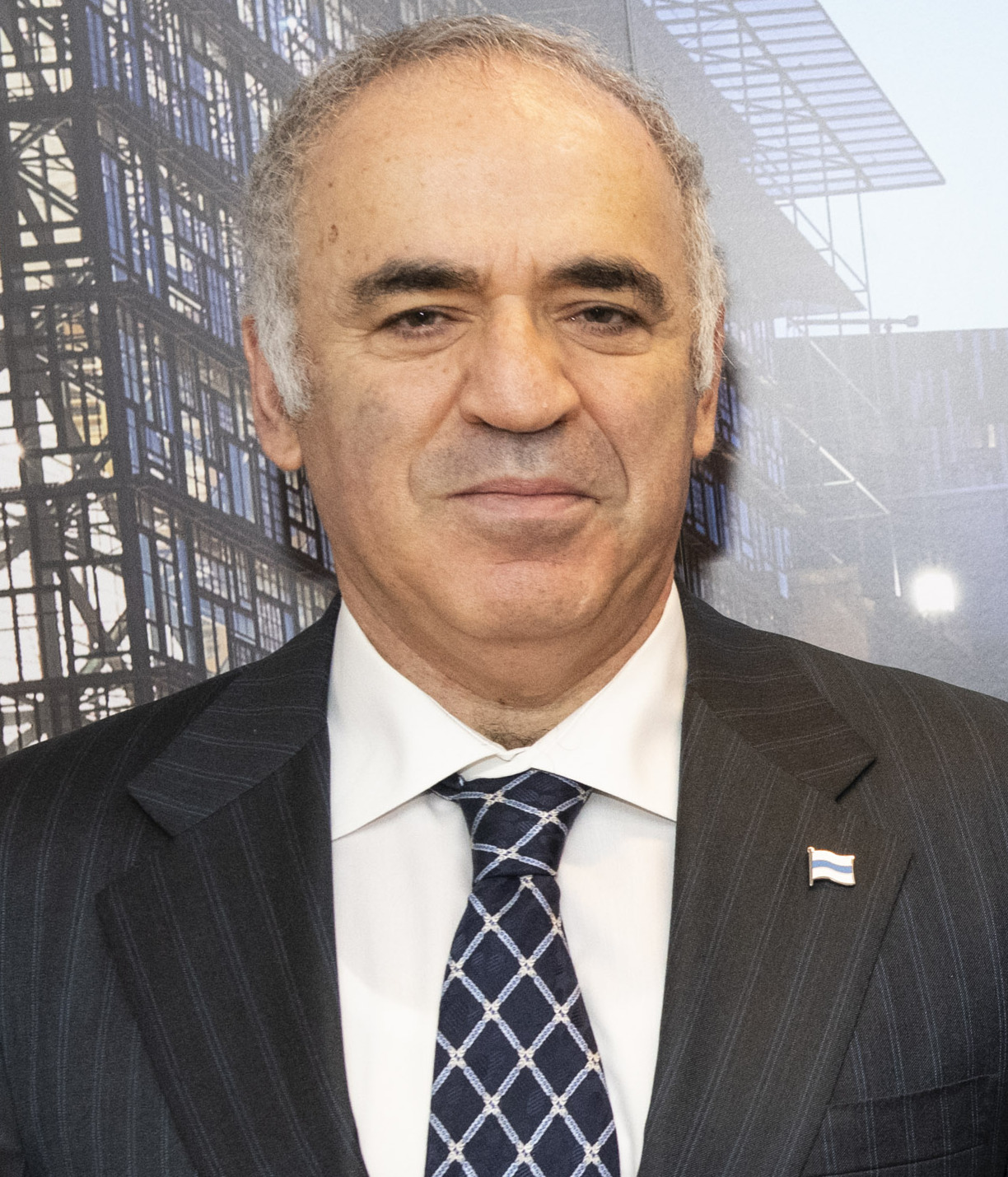
Former World Chess Champion and activist Garry Kasparov

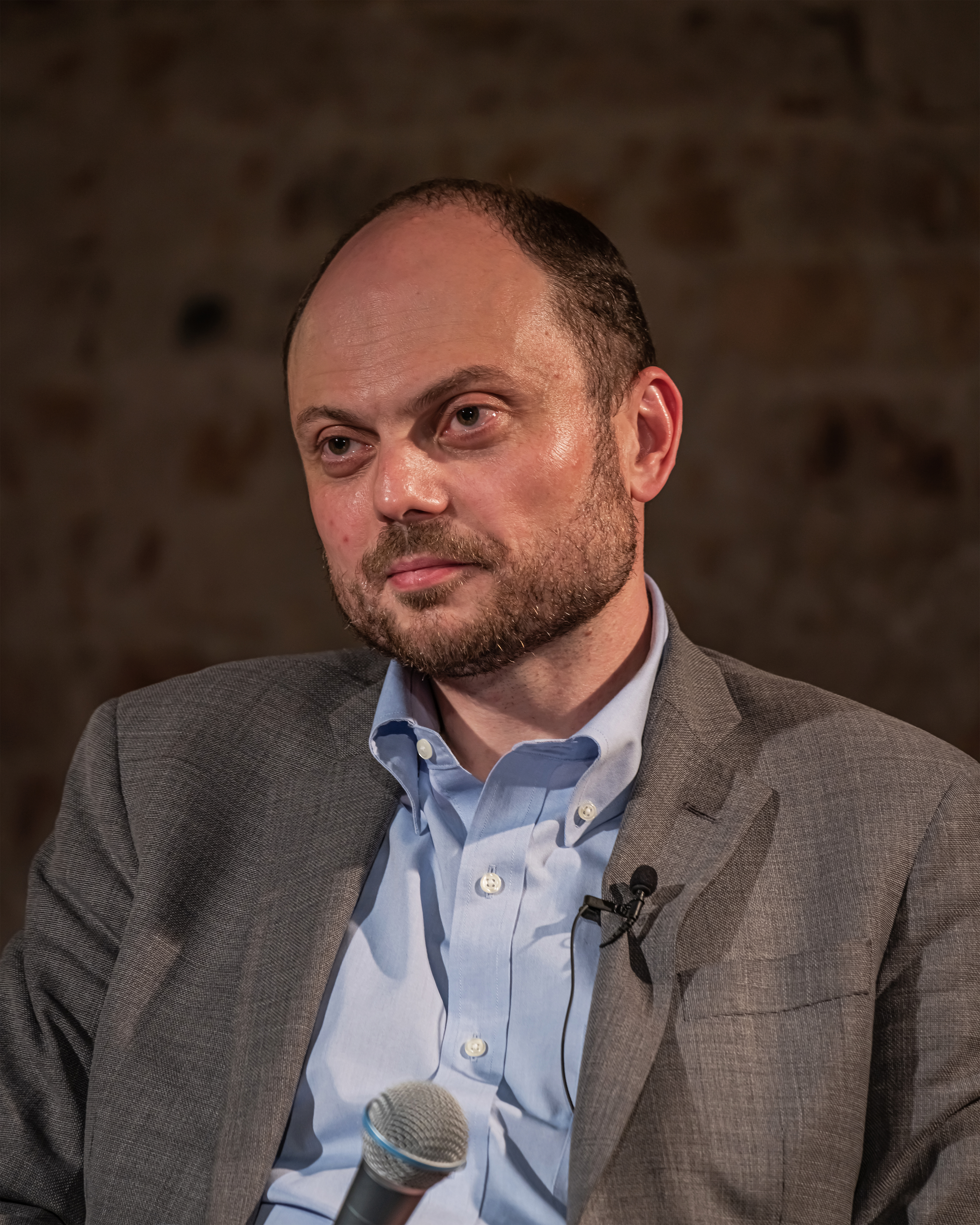
Activist and former political prisoner Vladimir Kara-Murza

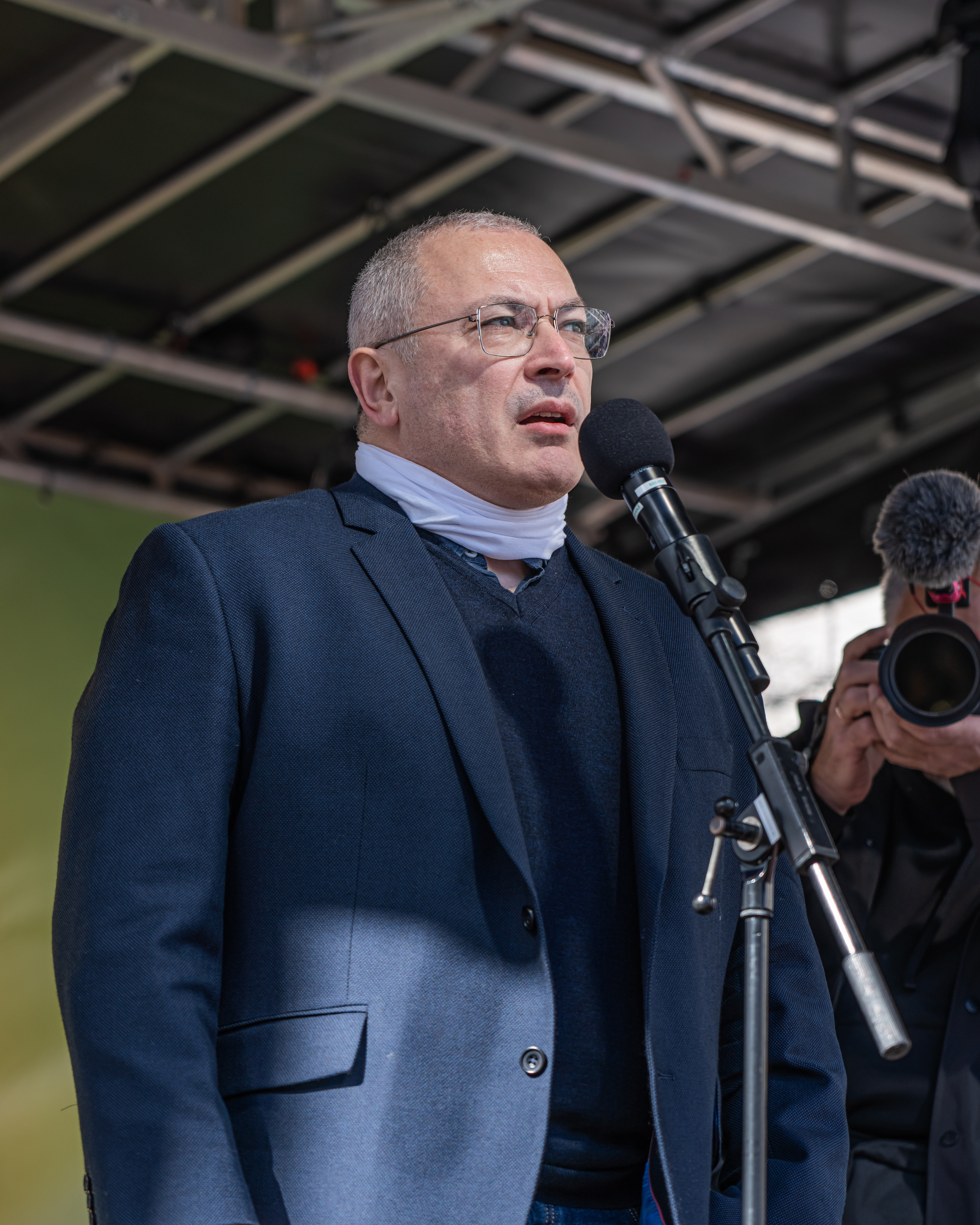
Activist and former Russian oligarch Mikhail Khodorkovsky

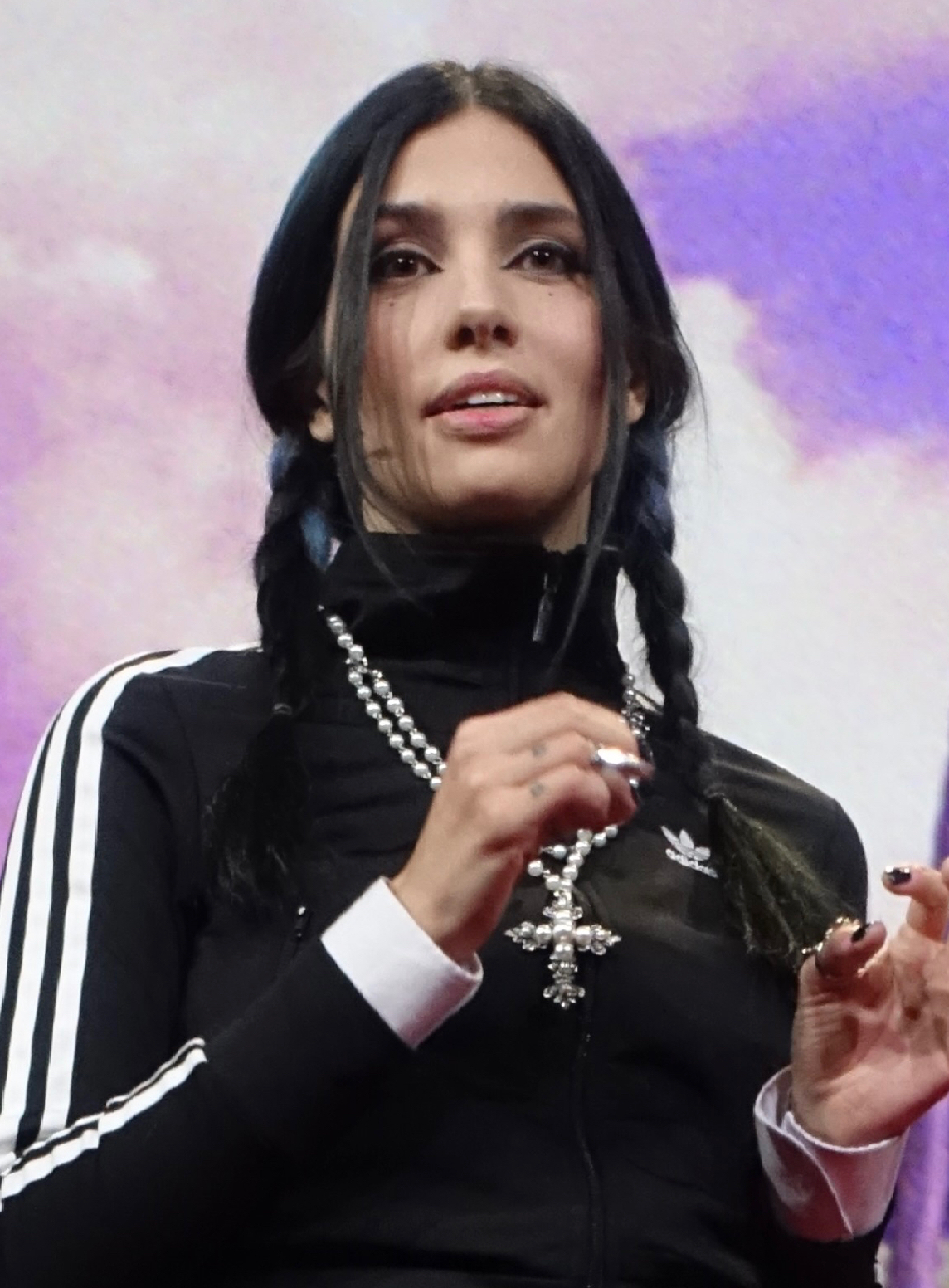
Activist and Pussy Riot founder Nadya Tolokonnikova

On January 26, 2026 the Parliamentary Assembly announced the full list of participants, which includes:

=== Representatives of the Russian Democratic Forces ===
- Natalia Arno, founder and president of the Free Russia Foundation
- Mark Feygin, lawyer and former State Duma deputy
- Dmitry Gudkov, politician, former leader of the Party of Changes, former State Duma deputy and member of the Anti-War Committee of Russia
- Vladimir Kara-Murza, political activist, vice president of the Free Russia Foundation and former member of the Anti-War Committee of Russia
- Garry Kasparov, former World Chess Champion, co-founder of the Free Russia Forum and member of the Anti-War Committee of Russia
- Mikhail Khodorkovsky, former Russian oligarch and member of the Anti-War Committee of Russia
- Oleg Orlov, human rights activist and chairman of the Memorial society
- Lyubov Sobol, lawyer, former member of the Anti-Corruption Foundation and former member of the Anti-War Committee of Russia
- Nadya Tolokonnikova, political activist, co-founder of Mediazona and founding member of the feminist group Pussy Riot
- Andrey Volna, surgeon

Organisation affiliation of current PACE Russian platform members as of 2026:

Member	Anti-War Committee of Russia	Free Russia Forum	Free Russia Foundation	
Member	AWCR	FRFor	FRFou	ROFSU
Natalia Arno			✓	
Mark Feygin		✓		
Dmitry Gudkov	✓			
Vladimir Kara-Murza			✓	
Garry Kasparov	✓	✓		
Mikhail Khodorkovsky	✓			
Oleg Orlov				
Lyubov Sobol				
Nadya Tolokonnikova				
Andrey Volna		✓		✓

=== Representatives of the indigenous peoples of Russia ===
- Yekaterina Kuznetsova, founder of the House of Ingria in Narva, Estonia
- Batlay Matenov, founder of the Asians of Russia movement
- Lana Pylayeva, founder of the Komi Daily media, Komi rights activist and member of the Feminist Anti-War Resistance
- Pavel Sulyandziga, member of the United Nations Working Group on the issue of human rights and transnational corporations and other business enterprises, former member of the Civic Chamber of Russia and Udege rights activist
- Ruslan Kutaev, former leader of the National Independence Party and former vice prime minister of the Chechen Republic of Ichkeria – On 29 April 2026, Petra Bayr temporarily suspended Kutaev's membership, but the bureau decided not to remove him on 27 May 2026.

=== PACE representatives ===
- Petra Bayr, President of the PACE and Chairwoman of the Platform
- Chairpersons of the political groups:
  - Frank Schwabe (Germany) for the Socialists, Democrats and Greens Group
  - Pablo Hispán (Spain) for the European People's Party Group
  - Zsolt Németh (Hungary) for the European Conservatives, Patriots & Affiliates
  - Iulian Bulai (Romania) for the Alliance of Liberals and Democrats for Europe Party
  - Laura Castel (Spain) and Yiorgos Loukaides (Cyprus) for the Unified European Left Group
- Reporters General:
  - Eerik-Niiles Kross (Estonia), reporter general on the Russian democratic forces
  - Ryszard Petru (Poland), reporter general on democracy in Belarus
  - George Papandreou (Greece), reporter general on democracy
  - Azadeh Rojhan Gustafsson (Sweden), reporter general on political prisoners
  - Emanuelis Zingeris (Lithuania), reporter general on human rights activists and whistleblowers
  - Valentina Grippo (Italy), reporter general on media freedom and journalists safety

== Goals and objectives ==
In media interviews, platform members outlined the following priority areas for their work:

- supporting efforts to free political prisoners in Russia;
- combating discrimination against Russian citizens in European states;
- modifying European Union sanction mechanisms, both regarding Russia and Russians residing abroad;
- conveying the position of anti-war Russians to the international community;
- planning a "post-Putin" transition in Russia

Representatives of the indigenous peoples of Russia expressed the intention to use the platform to discuss the situation of national minorities in Russia. Lana Pylayeva characterized the introduction of a quota for indigenous representatives as a significant step in overcoming the overly Moscow-centric nature of Russian politics.

== Reactions ==
In October 2025, shortly after the resolution establishing the platform was passed, Russia's Federal Security Service designated the Anti-War Committee of Russia as a terrorist organization and initiated criminal cases against all 19 of its members. The charges include forming a terrorist community and attempting to seize power. Those accused include Mikhail Khodorkovsky, Garry Kasparov, Vladimir Kara-Murza, Ekaterina Schulmann, Evgeny Chichvarkin, Sergei Guriev and others. According to the investigation, committee members allegedly lobbied for the creation of the PACE platform, which Russian authorities view as an attempt to form an alternative governing body and a transitional constituent assembly.

Ukrainian representatives in PACE did not block the decision to establish the platform, yet expressed doubts that the proposed candidates represented a genuine opposition. The Ukrainian delegation believed that Europe should engage only with those Russians who are serving in the Armed Forces of Ukraine. Candidates from Russian irregular units based in Ukraine also submitted applications, however, PACE officials did not include any of them in the platform's final composition.

The former president of PACE, Theodoros Rousopoulos, stated that the platform would provide an opportunity for representatives of Russia's democratic forces and Russians to openly express their position.

Frank Schwabe, a member of the Bundestag from the Social Democratic Party and a PACE-side participant in the platform, supported the creation of the structure, calling it the right step to provide Russia's democratic opposition with a public platform. Schwabe noted that the platform could become a first step toward the opposition's participation in the work of PACE committees and remarked on the naturalness of the disagreements that arose during its establishment.

Igor Gretskiy, a former international relations professor at Saint Petersburg State University and a researcher at Estonia's International Centre for Defence and Security, points to the problem of legitimacy regarding platform participants, who were not elected through a vote by Russian citizens.

Ekaterina Schulmann, a former political science professor at Russian Presidential Academy of National Economy and Public Administration and a non-resident scholar at the Carnegie Russia Eurasia Center, assessed the platform's formation positively, calling its composition balanced. She noted that most participants have experience in political activity and international recognition. At the same time, Schulmann pointed out the platform's lack of significant authority and its inability to influence regime change in Russia from abroad. Nevertheless, she remarks that the platform could become an important venue for expressing the position of anti-war Russians outside the country. Schulmann drew attention to the fact that the Russian authorities are taking the platform's creation very seriously, having launched a media campaign and initiated criminal cases against a number of its participants.

In March 2026, Meduza wrote that participant Nadya Tolokonnikova emerged as the most vocal and active member of the platform.

In October 2026, the platform was designated as an undesirable organization in Russia.

== Positions and statements ==
The platform's participants issued their first joint statement in February 2026, characterizing Russia as a systemic threat to the European legal order and expressing support for Ukraine, "including military support" to uphold the territorial integrity of the 1991 Borders.

The platform issued a statement condemning Russia's return to the Venice Biennale. In April 2026, Tolokonnikova drafted and forwarded a written declaration that was put up by Iulian Bulai and signed by 71 delegate members of PACE. This was the first written declaration to come from the platform. A similar position was subsequently put up as a motion for resolution by Bulai.

== Controversies ==
In April 2026, deputy secretary of the platform Anastasia Shevchenko drew criticism after calling on Italian authorities to detain Russian artists participating in the Venice Biennale and exchange them for Ukrainian prisoners of war held in Russia. Shevchenko later stated that she had been referring specifically to representatives cooperating with the Russian state and said the proposal was intended to draw attention to Ukrainian POWs. Members of the Anti-War Committee of Russia distanced themselves from the statement; committee member Marat Gelman told Radio Free Europe/Radio Liberty that the proposal had not been discussed within the organization and compared such actions to hostage-taking.

In the same month, statements by platform member Ruslan Kutaev triggered a public controversy and calls for his removal. In interviews, Kutayev described so-called "honor killings" in Chechnya as a matter to be decided by families, stating that "no one has the right to condemn" such decisions, and made derogatory remarks about LGBTQ people. These comments were widely criticized by human rights organizations and activists, who argued that they effectively justified violence and were incompatible with the platform's stated democratic and human rights principles. Following the backlash, rights groups formally appealed to the Parliamentary Assembly of the Council of Europe to review Kutayev's participation. Kutayev was temporarily suspended from his role on the platform, but on 26 May 2026, the bureau decided not to remove Kutayev.

== See also ==
- Russian opposition
- Anti-War Committee of Russia
- Anti-Corruption Foundation
- Free Russia Foundation
- Free Russia Forum
