= Thomas O'Melia =

Thomas O'Melia may refer to:

- Thomas A. O'Melia (1898–1973), American missionary to China
- Thomas O. Melia (born 1957), American politician
