= O'Melia =

O'Melia is a surname. Notable people with this surname include:

- Kathleen O'Melia (1869–1939), English-born teacher and missionary
- Thomas A. O'Melia (1898–1973), American Catholic missionary
