= Gera Ugryumova =

Russian activist and journalist

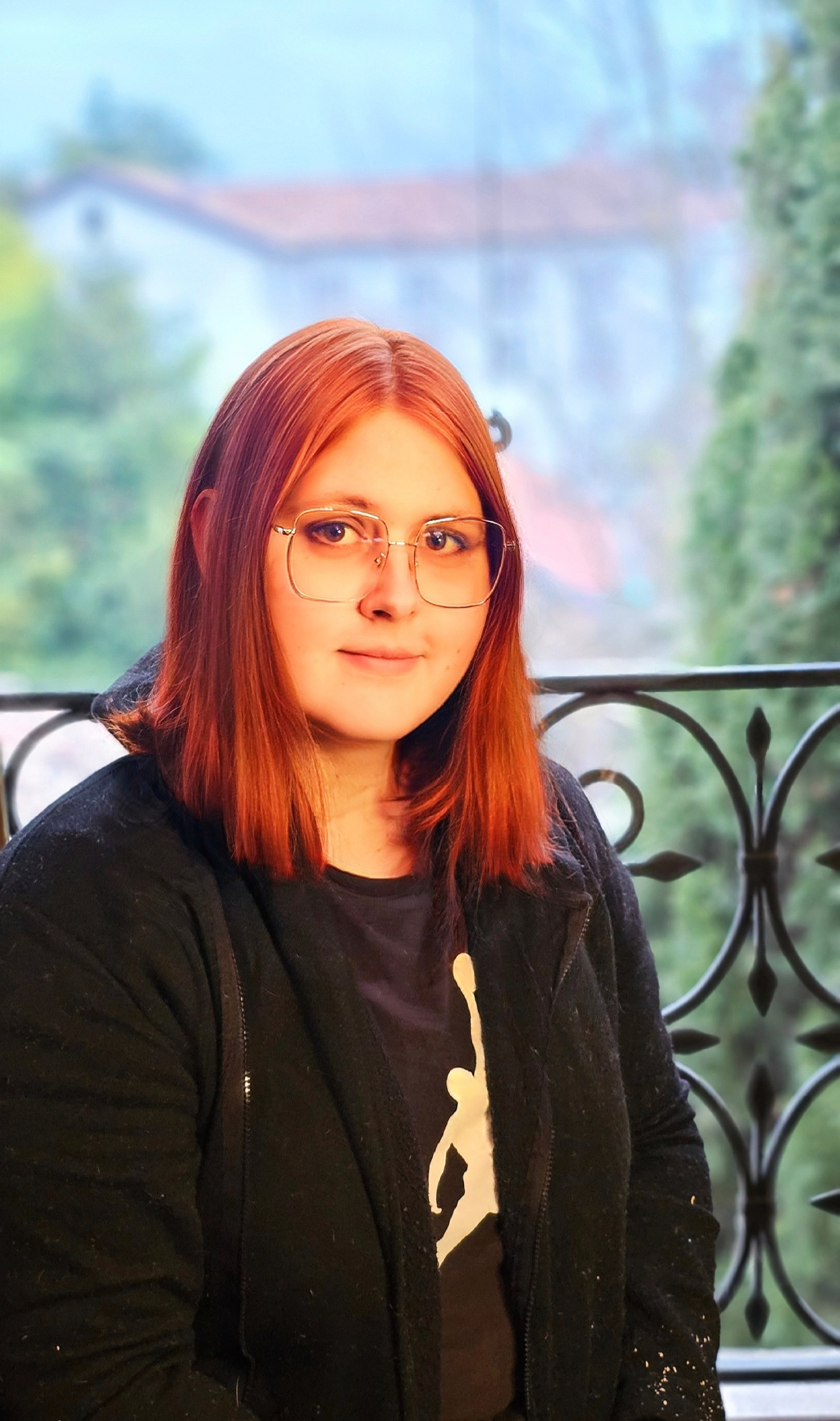
- Born: Russia
- Citizenship: Russia
- Occupations: Activist, public figure, journalist
- Known for: Founder of Iskra project, defending rights of Russians abroad

Gera Ugryumova (Russian: Гера Угрюмова; born c. 2001/2002) is a Russian activist and journalist, founder of the human rights project Iskra ('Spark'), which is based in Italy. She gained prominence for her activities defending the rights of Russians abroad following her emigration from Russia in 2022 after the full-scale Russian invasion of Ukraine. She sends inquiries to European banks, airlines, and government bodies regarding instances of discrimination against Russian citizens.

== Biography ==
In 2022, Gera Ugryumova was a third-year journalism student at the Peoples' Friendship University of Russia (RUDN University). After the start of the full-scale Russian invasion of Ukraine, facing the impossibility of engaging in independent journalism in Russia, Ugryumova left the university and emigrated from the country.

In May 2022, Ugryumova and a friend obtained a tourist visa for Italy, where she applied for political asylum. The legalization process took about a year; Ugryumova received a permanent residence permit (known in Russian as VNZh) at the end of May 2023. During the waiting period, she faced difficulties, including obtaining an Italian ID card and opening a bank account, and lived in refugee shelters. Obtaining all necessary documents took a year and a half. Immediately after relocating, Ugryumova also volunteered to help Ukrainian refugees in Italy.

== Public activity ==
In September 2023, facing ambiguity regarding the interpretation of EU sanctions concerning the import of personal belongings and cars by Russians, Ugryumova contacted the press attaché of the European Commission, identifying herself as an independent journalist. The response she received and the public reaction to her post about it on Twitter (now X) prompted her to systematically defend the rights of Russians abroad.

Ugryumova founded the human rights project Iskra ('Spark'), which is based in Italy and focuses on combating discrimination against Russians abroad. The project operates against the backdrop of a widespread problem where European banks refuse to open or close accounts for ordinary Russians not subject to sanctions, often due to excessive caution, misinterpretation of rules, or internal risk management policies, as noted by the Reuters agency. The project collects complaints from Russians facing various issues in emigration (refusals for housing and car rentals, obtaining medical insurance, residence permits, etc.). Iskra's activities include:

- Issues with banks and payment systems: Sending inquiries to banks and central banks of various countries regarding refusals to open or the closure of accounts for Russians. According to data cited by Reuters in February 2025*, referencing Gera Ugryumova, her organization Iskra, since the beginning of the full-scale invasion of Ukraine, has helped overturn approximately 5,000 bank decisions against Russians and prepared lawsuits against 42 credit institutions. In October 2023, Ugryumova stated that the payment system Visa had sent a document to banks in countries bordering Russia and not part of the EU, with a recommendation (or requirement) not to issue cards to non-resident Russians, even those with residence permits. She published a screenshot of the document, allegedly sent to an Azerbaijani bank, and reported potential fines of up to $1 million for violating banks. According to her, based on information from the Liber.Money project, it was confirmed at a meeting between Visa representatives, the Central Bank, and banks in Azerbaijan that the document concerned Russians. Novaya Gazeta Europe, which covered the story, noted that Visa representatives did not respond to an inquiry, and expert Arsen Kazibekov clarified that the mentioned document might have been distributed as early as April 2022 and that banks interpreted it as anti-Russian, although this was not explicitly stated in the text. Based on bank responses, instructions are compiled for Russians.
- Issues with airlines: Collecting information about airlines that denied boarding to Russians and sending inquiries to them.
- Educational issues: Ugryumova is helping at least one student who was rejected from a European university citing “sanctions” without specifying a specific sanction; Ugryumova claims that such sanctions do not exist.
- Consultations and assistance: The Iskra project also provides consultations on legalization and offers financial assistance to Russians in difficult life situations.

A Telegram chatbot is used to collect information about discrimination cases. Ugryumova states that her goal is to ensure the correct enforcement of laws and sanctions, without "over-compliance" by individual institutions, emphasizing the right of legal EU residents, including Russians, to a basic bank account according to EU directives.

== Reaction and recognition ==
Ugryumova's activities attracted attention in the Russian-speaking internet and among the Russian opposition in exile. Her blog on Twitter (X) grew significantly. Politician Maxim Katz contacted her, and she was invited to participate in a conference of the Anti-War Committee of Russia. Independent media outlets have written about her work, including Kholod, Ekho, Novaya Gazeta Europe, and the international agency Reuters.

In July 2024, Ugryumova found herself at the center of a public conflict on the social network X. The trigger was her story about a dispute with a landlord who refused to return the security deposit and demanded additional payment for utilities; according to Ugryumova, the rental agreement was not formalized at the owner's initiative, and the activist could not find other housing options. The situation drew criticism from some public figures and journalists. Politician Sergey Boyko accused Ugryumova of tax evasion through an undeclared rental agreement (referred to in Russian as 'vchernuyu') and questioned the lack of alternatives. Journalist Alexey Kovalyov published information about the activist's personal life (later partially deleting it) and suggested that Ugryumova had previously received "Putin's grants". This line was supported by politician Leonid Volkov, drawing parallels with the work of intelligence services. Mikhail Klimarev, founder of the Internet Protection Society, questioned the prominence and significance of Ugryumova's activities.

In response, Ugryumova explained that the mentioned "grants" were related to her work as a teenager (15 years old) as part of a career orientation program for a media outlet that received state support, not to her personally receiving a grant. She also stated that she rented the apartment without a contract due to the lack of other options, other than "ending up on the street". Ugryumova sent Alexey Kovalyov a pre-trial notice demanding an apology and compensation for reputational damage amounting to €25,000 for defamation regarding the alleged receipt of money from the Kremlin, threatening legal action.

Other commentators, including journalist Mikhail Litavrin and blogger Ulyana Yapparova, defended Ugryumova, pointing to her active assistance to relocants and the groundlessness of some claims. Journalist Yulia Latynina also supported Ugryumova.

Ugryumova has also faced other types of criticism: from Ukrainians demanding that Russians leave Europe; from those who deny the existence of the discrimination problems she describes; and from Russians remaining in Russia.

Ugryumova received offers of cooperation from political forces, but as of October 2023, she stated her intention to maintain independence.

== Funding ==
Gera Ugryumova finances her activities and the Iskra project through donations, which she solicits through her social media accounts. Ugryumova also noted that the public discussion of the conflict in July 2024 helped raise funds for her project's work.

== Notes ==
* The publication date is cited as 14 February 2025 in the Reuters source; however, this might be a typo, possibly meaning 2024.
