= De-Leninization =

Political reforms to dismantle the cult of Vladimir Lenin

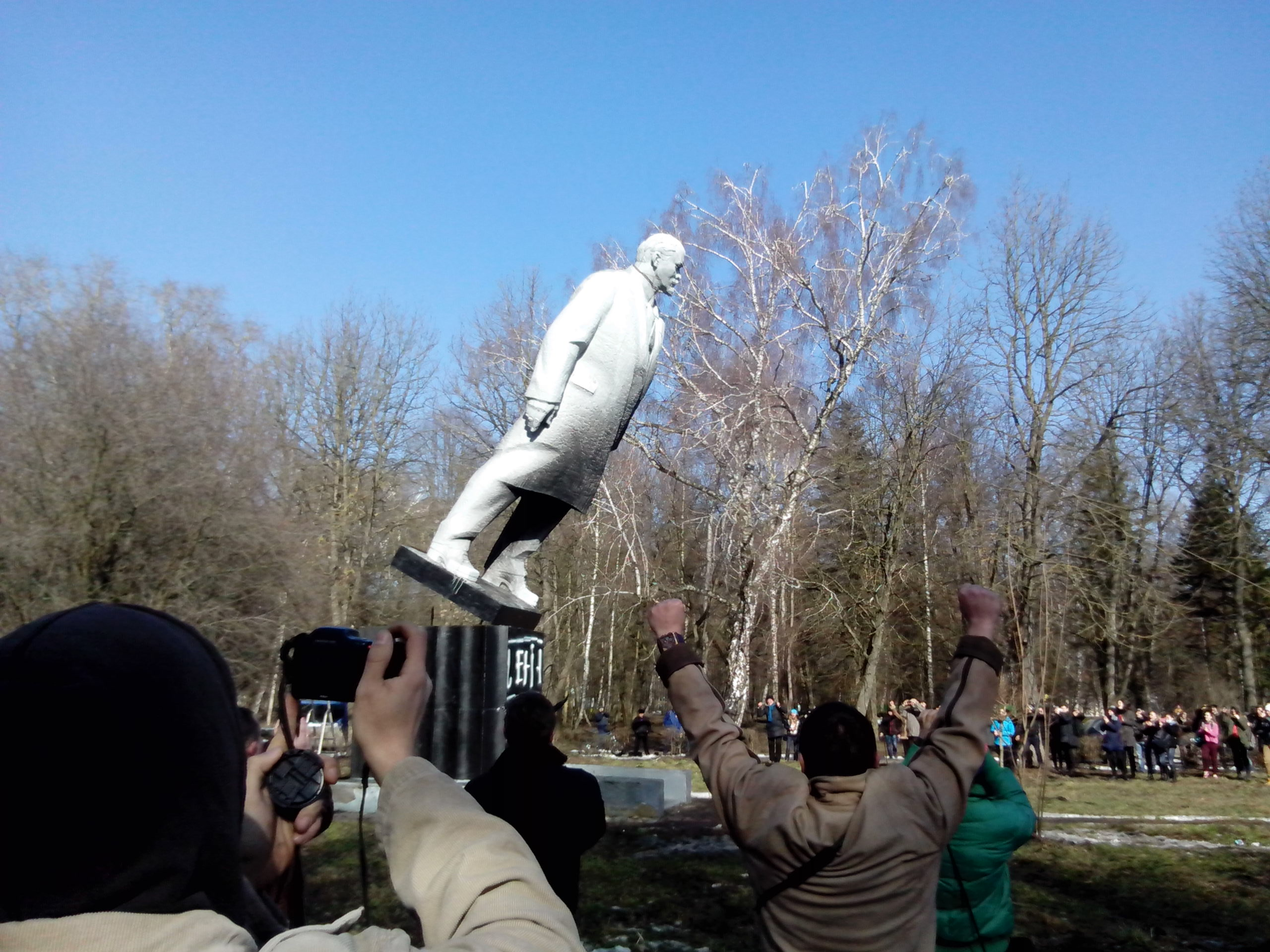
The toppling of a Lenin statue in Khmelnytsky park, Ukraine

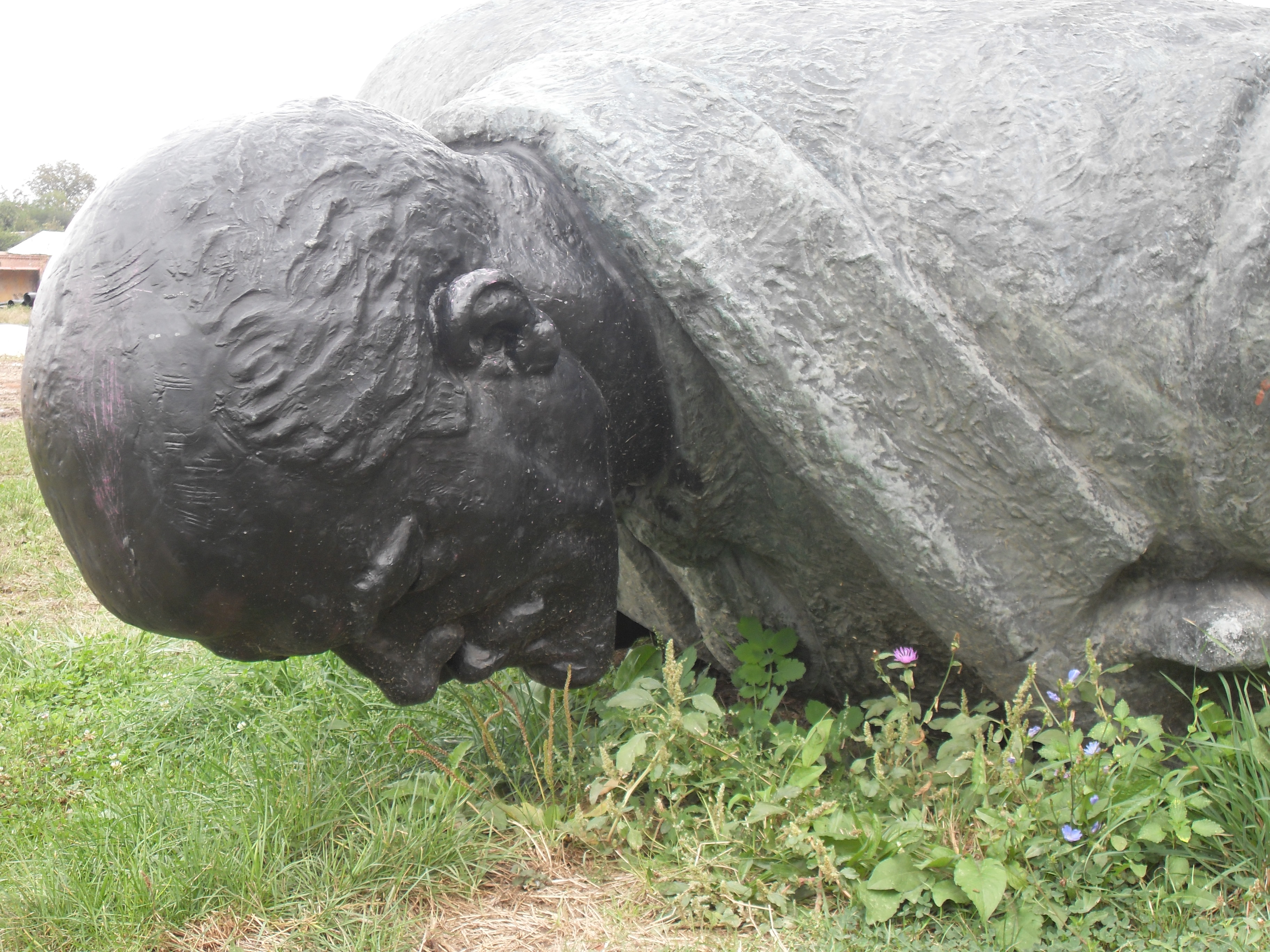
A toppled Lenin statue next to the Mogoşoaia Palace, Romania

De-Leninization (Ukrainian: Ленінопад, romanized: Leninopad, lit. 'Leninfall') is political reform aimed at refuting Leninist and Marxist–Leninist ideology and ending the personality cult of Vladimir Lenin. Examples include removing images and toppling statues of Lenin, renaming places and buildings, dismantling Lenin's Mausoleum currently in Red Square, Moscow, and burying his mummified corpse.

De-Stalinization began in the former Soviet Union in the mid-1950s during the Khrushchev thaw following the latter's secret speech "On the Cult of Personality and Its Consequences". But this was framed as a return to orthodox Leninism and thus the cult of Lenin remained until the dissolution of the USSR, when public challenges to the cult and its ideology and iconography began.

== In post-Soviet Russia ==
A referendum on restoring the historic name of Leningrad (the city's name in 1924–1991) was held on 12 June 1991, with 54.86% of Russian SFSR voters (with a turnout of 65%) supporting Saint Petersburg (the city's name in 1703–1914). Returning to Petrograd (the city's name in 1914–1924) was not on the ballot, and neither was the colloquial Piter. This change officially took effect on 6 September 1991. Meanwhile, the oblast whose administrative center is also in Saint Petersburg is still named Leningrad. This fact is largely attributed to the population of rural localities being more conservative, while the urban population is liberal and more Western-oriented.

In 1992, Lenin's likeness disappeared from the currency as Russia's banking system transitioned to the post-Soviet ruble.

There was some reform in education, and Lenin's name began to disappear from books, articles, and dissertations.

Former Soviet colonel general turned historian Dmitri Volkogonov gained access to the State Archive of the Russian Federation and wrote critical biographies of both Stalin and Lenin. He had previously been a head of the Soviet military's psychological warfare department.

However, there was only partial and intermittent removal of his statues and likenesses in Russia. As historian Yury Pivovarov notes, "All these metamorphoses predominantly took place in publishing, on TV and the radio… the dismantling of Lenin happened only verbally and almost didn’t materialize in any other way."

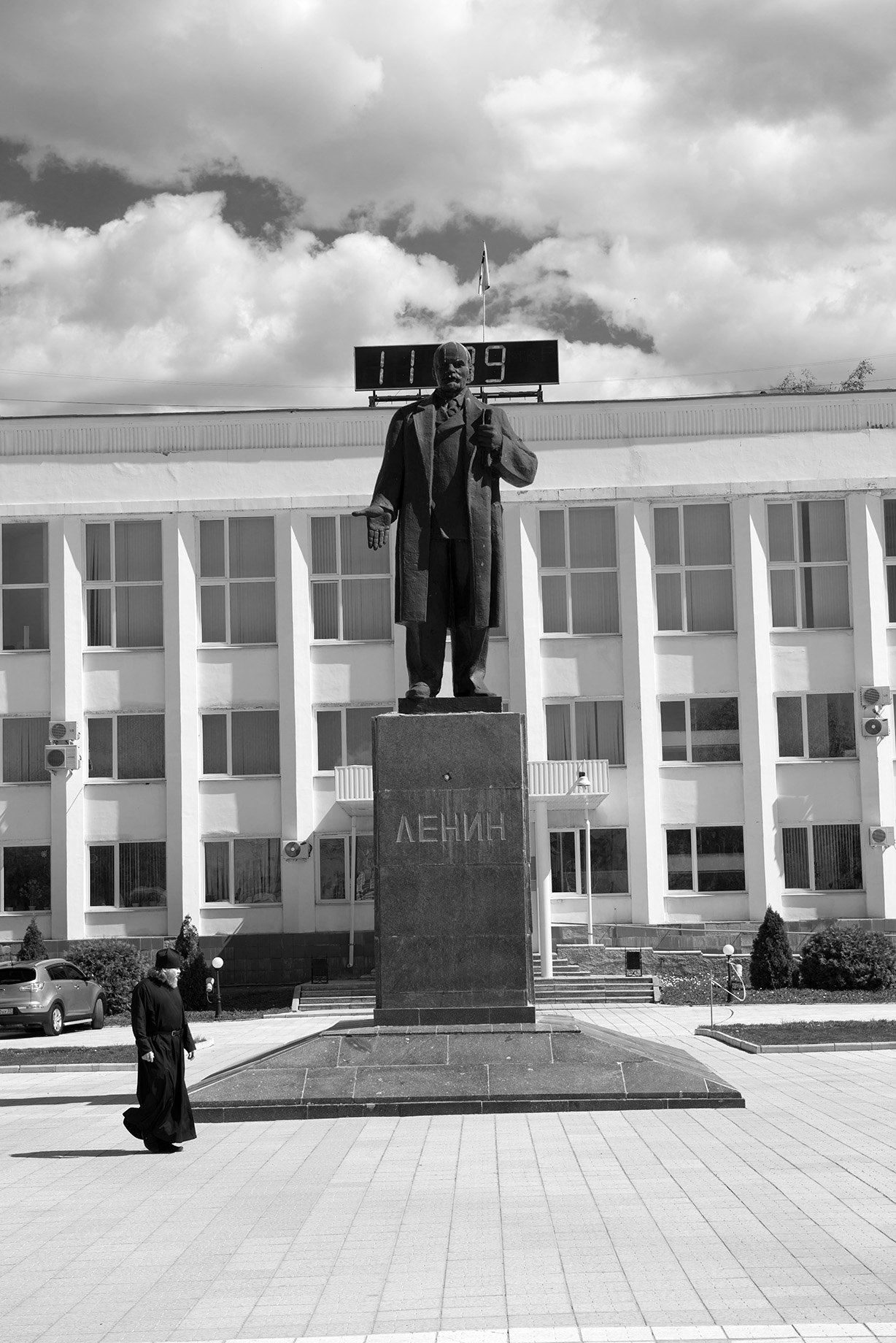
Statue of Lenin in Murom

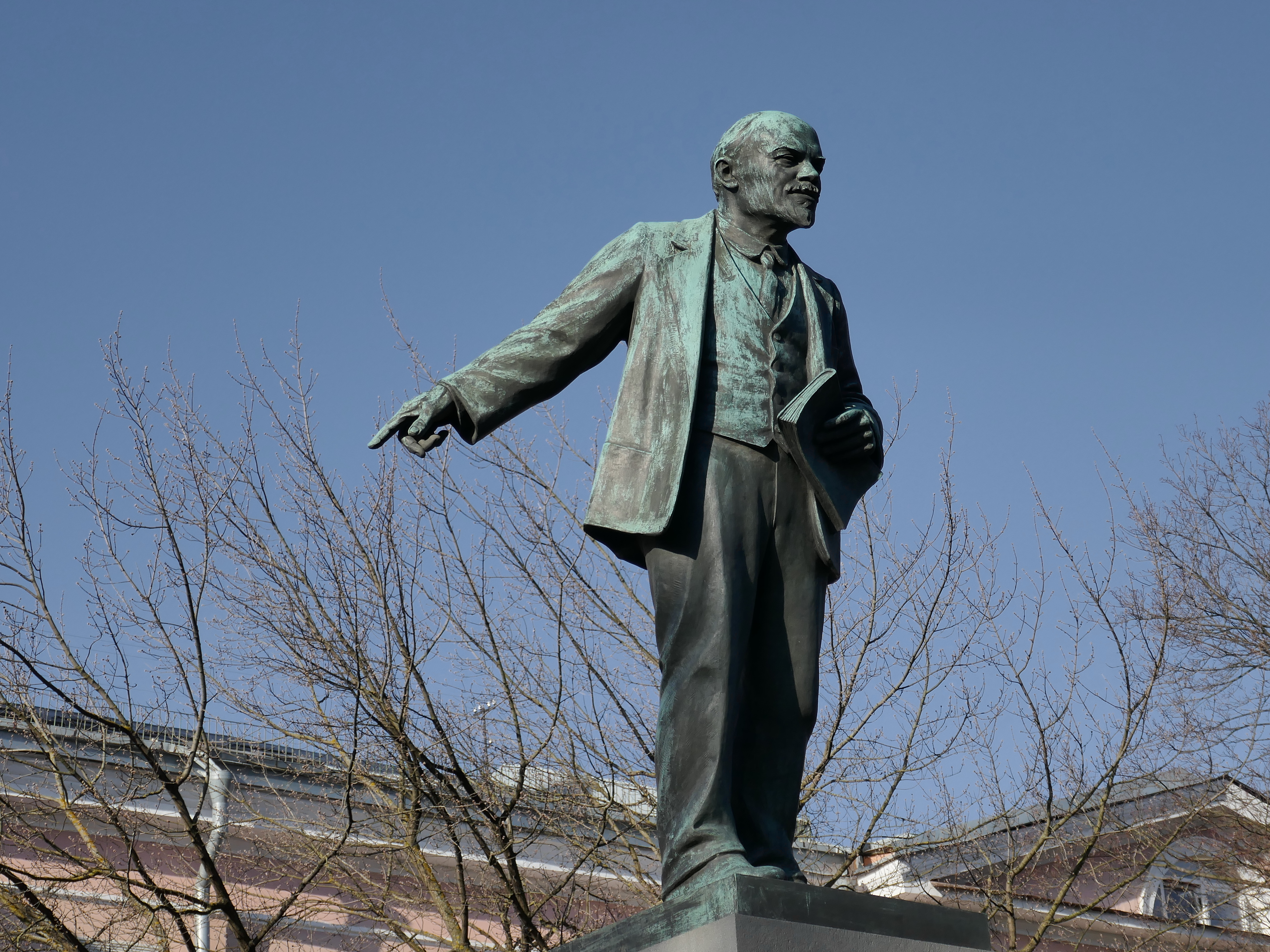
Statue of Lenin in Saint Petersburg

Out of 7,000 Lenin statues as of 1991, Russia retained the vast majority. As of 2022, there are approximately 6,000 monuments to Lenin in Russia.

Notable anti-communist measures in the Russian Federation include the banning of the Communist Party of the Soviet Union (and the creation of the Communist Party of the Russian Federation) as well as changing the names of some Russian cities back to what they were before the 1917 October Revolution (Leningrad to Saint Petersburg, Sverdlovsk to Yekaterinburg and Gorky to Nizhny Novgorod), though others were maintained, with Ulyanovsk (former Simbirsk), Tolyatti (former Stavropol) and Kirov (former Vyatka) being examples. Even though Leningrad and Sverdlovsk were renamed, regions that were named after them are still officially called Leningrad and Sverdlovsk oblasts.

Russia's first president Boris Yeltsin tried and failed to establish the new regime on a basis of anti-communism. Russian president Vladimir Putin made peace with the Communists when he came to power in 2000, but after his 2012 election began denouncing the Bolsheviks for their treachery in "betraying the country's national interests" to Germany in World War I. In 2016, he critiqued Lenin's concept of a federative state divided along ethnic lines, each with a right of secession. Various public figures also denounced Lenin for murdering the Tsar and his family and for killing priests. A 2017 survey showed that 56% of Russia's population had a favorable opinion of Lenin, with the majority of support coming from the older generation that lived in the USSR. In a 2021 poll, a record 70% of Russians indicated they had a mostly/very favourable view of Joseph Stalin.

In 2012, the state-sponsored Russia Today media network reported that Liberal-Democratic party (LDPR) deputy Aleksandr Kurdyumov proposed the removal of Lenin monuments to museums, citing high maintenance costs due to the prevalence of vandalism, and saying that Lenin's dominance was "unfair" to other outstanding personalities – such as Peter the Great, Alexander Suvorov, Ivan the Terrible and others. The lawmaker proposed regional referendums to decide the question.

Conscious attempts in Russian society to deal with the Soviet past have been uncertain. Organisations such as the Memorial Society have worked on numerous projects involving witnesses to past events (Gulag inmates, Soviet rights activists) and younger generations, including schoolchildren. The organization was officially banned in Russia in 2022.

=== Lenin's Mausoleum controversy ===
Many have proposed burying Lenin's corpse and dismantling the Lenin Mausoleum, including Mikhail Gorbachev, Boris Yeltsin, and hierophants of the Russian Orthodox Church. In 2017, legislation was proposed by six lawmakers, including three from Putin's United Russia party and three from the LDPR, but was opposed by the Russian Communist Party. The embalming and Mausoleum had been opposed from its outset by Leon Trotsky, Bukharin, Kamenev, by Lenin's widow Nadezhda Krupskaya, and reportedly by Lenin himself before his premature death.

== In Ukraine and other post-Soviet states ==
After the dissolution of the USSR, other post-Soviet states also began removing many of their Lenin monuments, although some have remained. In 1991, Ukraine, where the Soviet Union is viewed much more negatively than in Russia, (according to a poll by the sociological group Rating, 76% of Ukrainians support the initiative to rename streets and other objects whose names are associated with the Soviet Union and Russia after the 2022 Russian invasion of Ukraine) had 5,500 Lenin monuments, and until November 2015, approximately 1,300 Lenin monuments were still standing. More than 700 Lenin monuments were removed or destroyed between February 2014 and December 2015, On 9 April 2015, the Ukrainian parliament passed legislation on de-communization, which provided for their removal, signed into law on 15 May 2015.

Nostalgia for the Soviet Union is gradually on the rise in Russia. Communist symbols continue to form an important part of the rhetoric used in state-controlled media, as banning on them in other countries is seen by the Russian foreign ministry as "sacrilege" and "a perverse idea of good and evil". The process of decommunization in Ukraine, a neighbouring post-Soviet state, was met with fierce criticism by Russia, who regularly dismisses Soviet war crimes.

== See also ==
- Decommunization
- Anti-communism
- Demolition of monuments to Vladimir Lenin in Ukraine
- Demolition of the Vladimir Lenin monument in Kyiv
- Muzeon Park of Arts
- Good Bye, Lenin!
- David Shub – exiled social democrat revolutionary who wrote an early critical biography of Lenin.
- Leon Trotsky – Bolshevik revolutionary, exponent of Trotskyism.
