= Yuri Pivovarov =

Russian historian and political scientist (1950-)

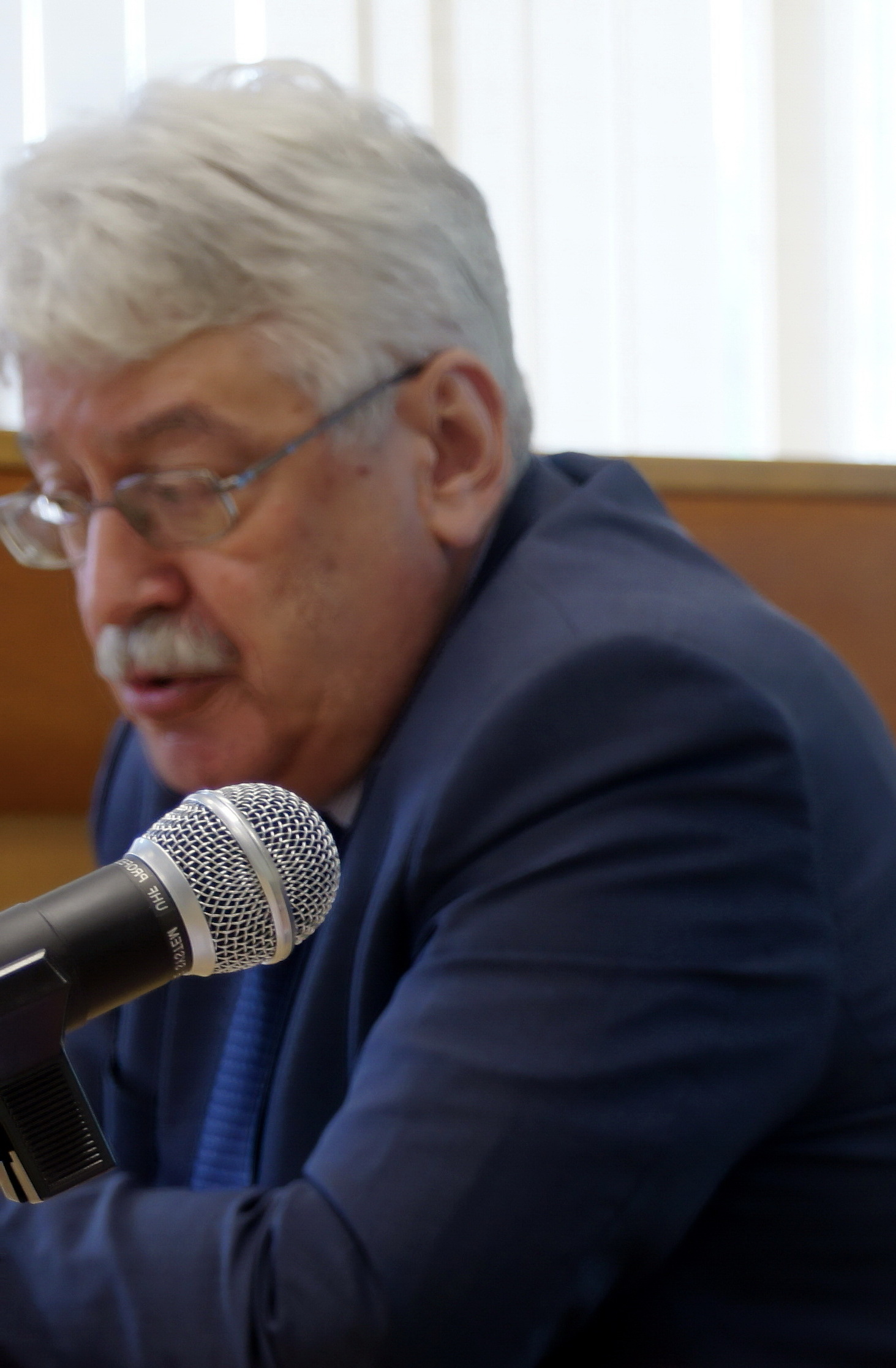
Pivovarov in 2014

Yuri Sergeyevich Pivovarov (Russian: Юрий Сергеевич Пивоваров; born 25 April 1950) is a historian and political scientist, member of the Russian Academy of Sciences and since 1998, the Director of the Institute of Scientific Information on Social Sciences of the Russian Academy of Sciences.

Pivovarov graduated from the Moscow State Institute of International Relations (MGIMO) of the USSR Ministry of Foreign Affairs (MFA).

Pivovarov was chair of Comparative Political Science of the Faculty of Political Science (Moscow State University). President Emeritus of the Russian Political Science Association. Member of the Expert Council under the Chairman of the Federation Council, member of the Scientific Council under the Russian Ministry of Foreign Affairs and of others.

In a 2017 letter to president Putin, the Committee of Concerned Scientists expressed support for Pivovarov against government harassment, calling him a "highly respected academic in Russia and abroad", citing another open letter of support signed by over 100 prominent Russian intellectuals and members of RAS.

Pivovarov has written on De-Leninization in Russia. Member of the Anti-War committee of Russia, and a signatory to letters to EU leaders calling for sanctions on Russian oil and gas and foreign exchange earnings.
