= Thomas O. Melia =

American government official

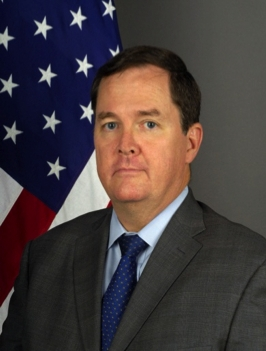
- Official State Department Portrait
- Born: Thomas O. Melia; May 28, 1957 (age 69); Frankfurt, Germany
- Education: Johns Hopkins University

Thomas O. Melia (born May 28, 1957, in Frankfurt, Germany) is an American foreign policy expert, democracy advocate, author and university professor. He has served in senior positions in the U.S. government, U.S. Senate, civil society organizations, and academia, including roles in the administration of Barack Obama, at the U.S. Agency for International Development (USAID) and the U.S. Department of State. Melia is a senior fellow at Georgetown University, chairman of the board of directors of the Free Russia Foundation, and a director of the Middle East Broadcasting Networks.

== Early life and education ==
Melia was born in Frankfurt, Germany, where his parents were teachers for the children of U.S. military personnel, the eldest of five children. He studied international relations at Johns Hopkins University, receiving a Bachelor of Arts degree. He later earned a Master of Arts from the university’s Paul H. Nitze School of Advanced International Studies (SAIS), where he focused on sub-Saharan Africa. During graduate school he worked as an intern at the National Security Council on African affairs and also at the U.S. embassy in Nouakchott, Mauritania.

== Career ==
=== Early career ===
Melia began his professional career in Washington as a research assistant to U.S. Senator Daniel Patrick Moynihan (Democrat of New York) and later became the senator’s senior legislative assistant for foreign and defense policy. In 1986 he joined the AFL CIO’s Free Trade Union Institute (later the Solidarity Center), where he worked on international labor and democracy programs, including the provision of material support to Solidarność , the independent Polish trade union movement.

From 1988 to 2001 Melia worked at the National Democratic Institute for International Affairs (NDI), where he led the expansion of the organization’s democracy-assistance programs in Central and Eastern Europe before and after the fall of the Fall of the Berlin Wall. He then directed both NDI’s Middle East programs and its democratic governance initiatives, providing advisory assistance to legislatures and local governments in democratizing countries. He later became the institute’s vice president for programs, overseeing activities across the globe.

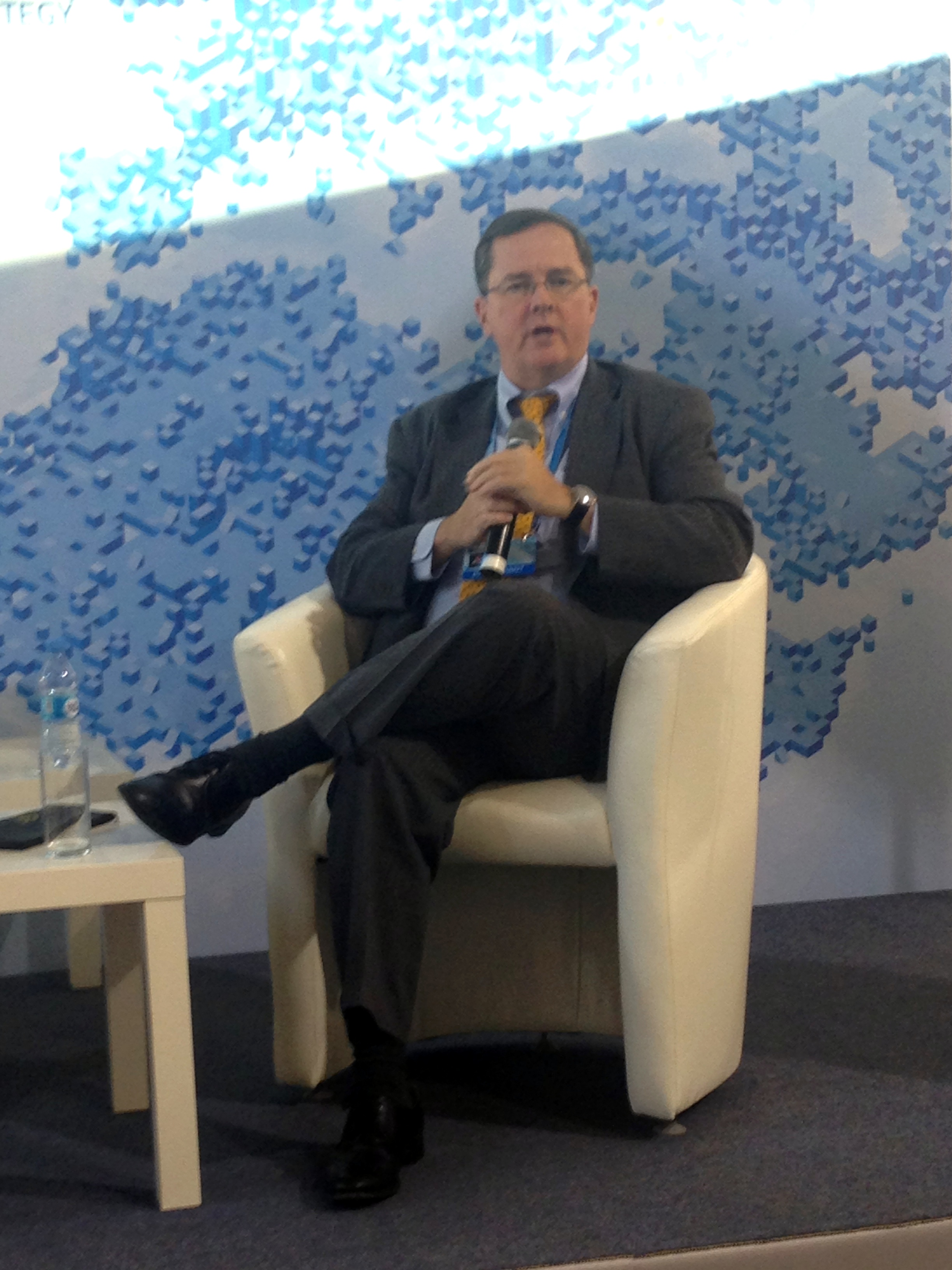
Thomas O. Melia at Yalta European Strategy 2014 in Kyiv, Ukraine

=== Academic and research work ===
Since 1999, Melia has been an adjunct or visiting professor teaching graduate-level courses on democracy promotion and international affairs at several universities, including Georgetown University, Carnegie Mellon University, Princeton University, and his alma mater, The Johns Hopkins University. In May 2026, he was Practitioner-in-Residence at Northwestern University’s Roberta Buffett Institute for Global Affairs.

After leaving NDI, Melia worked as a public opinion researcher at the international polling firm Greenberg Quinlan Rosner (GQR). He then became research director at the Institute for the Study of Diplomacy at Georgetown University. His research there included studies on Congressional attitudes toward the State Department and early public-opinion surveys conducted in post-Taliban Afghanistan and post-Saddam Hussein Iraq. He also wrote a white paper for the Princeton Project on National Security entitled, “The Democracy Bureaucracy; the Infrastructure of American Democracy Promotion.”

He later became deputy executive director at Freedom House, where he helped oversee global research and advocacy programs related to democracy and human rights. Melia was also the principal drafter of a methodology on how to assess the needs of human rights defenders in difficult environments. He also testified before the U.S. Congress and advised foreign governments on democratic governance and political reform.

=== Obama administration ===
During the administration of Barack Obama, Melia served in two senior government roles. From 2010 to 2015 he was Deputy Assistant Secretary of State in the Bureau of Democracy, Human Rights, and Labor at the U.S. Department of State, where he oversaw the bureau’s work across Europe, Central and South Asia, and the Middle East.

He later served as the Senate-confirmed Assistant Administrator for Europe and Eurasia at the U.S. Agency for International Development (USAID) from 2015 to 2017, directing U.S. development and democracy programs in the region.

During his time at the State Department, he served as the U.S. co-chair of the U.S.–Russia Civil Society Working Group under the bilateral strategic framework between the United States and Russia. In 2013 he announced the closure of the working group in response to the Russian government’s crackdown on civil society organizations.

=== Later career ===
Following his government service, Melia worked in several academic and policy roles. He became Washington director of PEN America, an organization promoting freedom of expression and the protection of writers worldwide. He also served as a senior fellow at the Foreign Policy Research Institute and as a non-resident fellow with the George W. Bush Institute in Dallas, Texas.

From 2021 to 2025 he served as senior foreign policy adviser to U.S. Senator Benjamin L. Cardin and deputy staff director for the Democratic staff of the United States Senate Committee on Foreign Relations.

In 2025, after leaving Capitol Hill, he was elected chairman of the board of the Free Russia Foundation, a nonprofit organization supporting democratic movements and civil society initiatives related to Russia and its neighbors. He was also elected in 2025 to the board of directors of the Middle East Broadcasting Networks (MBN), the U.S. public international broadcasting entity for the Arabic-speaking world.

== Publications and commentary ==
Melia has written widely on history, democracy promotion, foreign policy, and governance. His articles and commentary have appeared in publications such as The Atlantic, Washington Post,The New Republic, Journal of Democracy, and The American Interest. He has also contributed to academic debates on the institutional development of democracy-promotion programs and the role of legislatures in emerging democracies. He has been quoted in The New York Times and the Washington Post, and been interviewed on CNN and CBC (Canadian Broadcasting Company).

He has also co-edited the volume Today’s American: How Free?, an examination of civil liberties and political rights in the United States.

== Board affiliations ==
In addition to his roles at the Free Russia Foundation and MBN, Melia has served on the boards of directors of several nonprofit organizations, including the Center for Civic Education and the Project on Middle East Democracy (POMED), where he was chair of the board 2017 to 2021.

== Research ==
Melia’s research has focused on democracy promotion, governance, and the role of civil society in political transitions. His work has examined how democratic institutions develop in post-authoritarian states and the ways international organizations and governments support democratic reforms. Much of his research has addressed political transformation in Central and Eastern Europe following the end of the Cold War, as well as governance challenges in the Middle East and Eurasia.

During his time at the Institute for the Study of Diplomacy at Georgetown University, Melia analyzed public attitudes toward diplomacy and international engagement and how the rise of terrorism was changing the conduct of American diplomacy.

== Views and opinions ==
Melia has written and spoken extensively on issues related to democracy, human rights, and foreign policy. He has emphasized the importance of civil society organizations, independent media, and democratic institutions in maintaining political accountability and protecting fundamental freedoms. His commentary has frequently addressed the challenges faced by democratic movements in authoritarian or semi-authoritarian political systems. He has also written about the importance of protecting freedom of expression and strengthening global institutions that promote democratic values.

Melia has commented on political developments in the Middle East, as well as in Russia and Eastern Europe and has argued that support for civil society and democratic institutions is an important element of long-term international stability.

== Awards and board affiliations ==
- Eagle Scout, Vigil Honor (Order of the Arrow)
- Board of Directors, Project on Middle East Democracy (POMED)

== Selected publications ==
=== Books (edited volumes) ===
- Melia, T. O.; Puddington, A.; Kelly, J., eds. (2008). Today's American: How Free?. Lanham, MD: .: Rowman & Littlefield. ISBN 978-0742562912.
- Longley, Lawrence D.; Melia, Thomas O.; Specialists, International Political Science Association Research Committee of Legislative; Association, Commonwealth Parliamentary (1998). World Encyclopedia of Parliaments and Legislatures. Congressional Quarterly. ISBN 978-0-87187-987-5.
- Melia, T. O.; Pfifferling, S. (1986). How They Rate. Washington, DC:. Quadriga Research.

=== Articles, Op-eds, and Essays ===
- Melia, T. O. (2020, July 30). The Next High Crime. The American Interest.
- Melia, T. O. (2019, June 25). Facing Big Brother’s Stare. The American Interest.
- Melia, T. O. (2019, April 18). Not a “president.” Not an “ally.” Foreign Policy Research Institute.
- Melia, T. O. (2019, January 23). Repression is Contagious. The American Interest.
- Melia, T. O. (2018, November 29). America Heal Thyself. The American Interest.
- Melia, T. O. (2018, October 5). The Courage of the Powerless versus the Craven Behemoth. The American Interest.
- Melia, T. O. (2018, August 30). John McCain Speaks to the Ages. The American Interest.
- Melia, T. O. (2018, August 16). A Turbulent Century in the Heart of Europe. The American Interest.
- Melia, T. O. (2018, July 11). Swagger is as Swagger Does. The American Interest.
- Melia, T. O. (2018, June 22). The world is Still a Dangerous Place. The American Interest.
