= Oleg Orlov =

Russian human rights activist

- Олег Орлов
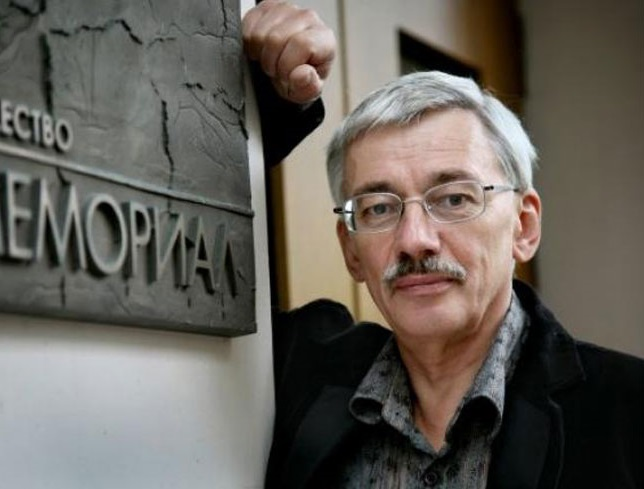
- Born: Oleg Petrovich Orlov; April 4, 1953 (age 73); Moscow, Russian SFSR, Soviet Union
- Education: Moscow State University
- Occupations: Historian, civil rights activist
- Known for: participation in Soviet dissident movement and struggle against political abuse of psychiatry in the Soviet Union
- Movement: dissident and human rights movements in the Soviet Union

Oleg Petrovich Orlov (Russian: Олег Петрович Орлов; born April 4, 1953) is a Russian human rights activist who has participated in post-Soviet Union human rights movements. He serves as the chairman of the Board of Human Rights Center “Memorial,” and is an executive board member of the Center's International, Historic-Educational Society. From 2004 until 2006, Orlov was in the Presidential Council for Civil Society and Human Rights of the Russian Federation. Through his work with Memorial, Orlov was a laureate of the 2009 Sakharov Prize in recognition of his human rights work. He is a member of the federal political council movement Solidarnost.

== Biography ==
Oleg Orlov was born on April 4, 1953, to the Orlov family. His father, Pyotr Mikhailovich, was a graduate of Moscow Engineering Physics Institute (MEPHI) and worked as an engineer; his mother, Svetlana Nikolaevna, was a graduate of Moscow State University (MGU) philological faculty and a school teacher. As a young man, Pyotr Mikhailovich served in army during the World War II and in that time he joined the Communist Party and was an avid communist. Yet 20th Congress of the Communist Party, which in 1956 condemned a cult of Stalin and revealed information on the crimes of Stalinism, had a strong impact on Oleg's father. From that time on, according to Oleg Orlov, his father became a determined opponent of the Communism. People frequently met in the kitchen of their Moscow apartment to hold political conversations, discuss socio-political matters, and listen to songs of bards.

Having not succeeded in getting into Moscow State University (MGU) on his first try, Oleg Orlov became a student of the Agrarian University – Moscow Timiryazev Agricultural Academy, where he completed three years with very good results. Then he transferred to the biology faculty at MGU. Upon finishing his studies he worked for the Institute of Plant Physiology at the Academy of Sciences of the Soviet Union. He was fascinated with mixotrophs and planned to pursue a career in biology.

In the Plant Physiology Institute Orlov met his future wife, Tatyana.

== Beginning of the human rights work ==
After the start of the war in Afghanistan in 1979 Orlov made himself a primitive copy machine (hectograph), and for two years put up political leaflets dedicated to the war, the situation in Poland, and the activity of the Solidarity (Solidarność) movement.

After two years of his solitary activism, in 1988 Orlov joined an initiative group “Memorial”: a group dedicated to supporting the rehabilitation of victims of political repression in the Soviet Union, publicizing the facts of mass human rights infringements in the USSR, establishing monuments to the victims of political repression, creating a museum and library devoted to the theme of political repression, and freeing of political prisoners.

Subsequently, the All-union, voluntary, historic-educational society “Memorial” was formed on the basis of the original initiative group. Orlov became one of the founders of historical and educational part of prodemocratic groups, which later became a core of “Memorial”. From 1988–1989 he actively participated in the preparatory and founding congresses of “Memorial”. The movement was registered in 1991 and later was renamed to the International Historic-Educational Human Rights and Charity Organization “Memorial”. Orlov became one of the trustees of the organization.

== Working of human rights within governmental structures ==
In 1990 Orlov participated in the electoral block “Elections-90” [Vybory-90], was the authorized representative of human rights defender Sergei Kovalevn elections in the Supreme Soviet of the Soviet Union and after his election worked in the administration of the Supreme Council where he held the position of specialist on a committee for human rights. Orlov worked on laws dealing with the humanization of the penitentiary system in Russia and the rehabilitation of victims of political repression. While occupying this position, Orlov simultaneously became chairman of the Board for the Human Rights Center “Memorial.”

During the coup in Moscow in 1991 Orlov was a defender of the russian White House (House of Soviets).

In April 2004 Orlov became a member of the President of the Russian Federation's council for the development of civil society and human rights institutions under the leadership of the Human Rights Commissioner Ella Pamfilova. In 2006 he left the council as a sign of protest against a comment made by Russian president Vladimir Putin concerning the murder of journalist Anna Politkovskaya, in which he announced that the murder brought Russia a bigger loss than her publications.

== Hotspots in the former USSR ==
From 1991 to 1994 he was an observer of conflict zones in Armenia, Azerbaijan, Tajikistan, Moldova, and the Ingushetia-Ossetia conflict in the North Caucasus. He also co-authored many reports for “Memorial.”

Beginning in 1994 Orlov, together with Sergei Kovalev, the chair of the Committee of Human Rights under the President of Russia, worked in the military conflict zone of the Chechen Republic. He personally met Chechen leaders Dzhokhar Dudaev and Aslan Maskhadov, participated in negotiations to exchange prisoners, and inspected hospitals and camps for prisoners of war.

In June 1995 Oleg Orlov, as part of a group headed by Kovalev, participated in negotiations with terrorists, who under the direction of Shamil Basaev captured hostages in the city of Budyonnovsk. After successful negotiations, members of Kovalev's group (including Orlov) became voluntary hostages in order to guarantee the agreed-upon exchange of the majority of hostages.

Subsequently, Orlov and Human Rights Center “Memorial” gave much attention to the problem of kidnapping in the Caucasus and victims among the peaceful populations of the Chechnya, Ingushetia and Dagestan. Orlov also refused an offer from Kovalev to work in the presidential human rights structure.

Since the beginning of the Second Chechen War in October 1999 Orlov has headed the work of “Memorial” in the North Caucasus, where representatives of “Memorial” work in Chechnya, Ingushetia, Dagestan, Northern Ossetia, Kabardino-Balkariya, and Stavropol territory.

== Attack in Nazran ==
On the night of November 24, 2007, the day before a protest in Nazran, the capital of Ingushetia, Oleg Orlov and a group of TV reporters from REN TV were taken hostage in a Nazran hotel by an armed group of people in masks. While threatening the hostages with their weapons, the kidnappers forced them to wear black bags and drove the hostages outside the city to a field, where they dragged them from the car and began beating them. One of the journalists who suffered through the ordeal later told:

“They beat us silently. After that, one of them said they were going to shoot us now. But then with a snicker he added, ‘It’s a pity we didn’t bring silencers’ and then they left.”

The attackers stole video equipment, documents, cell phones, and personal items from Orlov and the journalists. An hour before the attack the patrol squad that was keeping watch in the Assa Hotel left their post under orders from their superiors. The car with the hostages was not stopped once along the way. Oleg Orlov and the other victims are convinced they were attacked by officers of special services and that the attack itself was “an act of intimidation.”

According to the facts of the attack a court case was drawn up under three articles of the Criminal Code of the Russian Federation (UKRF): “hindrance of lawful professional work of journalists” (item 144, part 1 UKRF), “illegal penetration into a dwelling with application of violence” (item 139, part 2 UKRF), and “theft – open plunder of another’s property” (item 161, part 1 UKRF). A group of well-known Russian human rights activists appealed to the Human Rights Commissioner in Russia, Vladimir Lukin, and to Ella Pamfilova, the Chairman of the President of the Russian Federation's council for the development of civil society and human rights institutions. In their appeal they pointed out the inaccuracy in the particulars of the court case:

“The investigators ‘did not make note’ that ‘kidnapping’ (item 126), ‘threat by murder’ (item 119), ‘assault’ (item 116), and ‘deliberate harm to health’ (item 112) took place. A one-and-a-half hour run wearing only socks in freezing cold weather is already a sufficient basis to begin speaking of inhuman treatment to victims. Finally, ‘plunder of property with application of violence’ is not qualified as ‘theft’, but as ‘robbery’ (item 162 UKRF).”

== Kadyrov’s lawsuits ==
In 2009 Orlov placed blame for the murder of “Memorial” employee Natalya Estemirova, which took place in July 2009, on the head of the President of the Chechnya, Ramzan Kadyrov. In response to this, Kadyrov filed suit against Orlov and HRC “Memorial” in order to protect his honor, dignity, business reputation, and to receive compensation for moral injury. On October 6, 2009, the judge partly satisfied Kadyrov's claim, collecting 20 thousand Rubles from Orlov and 50 thousand Rubles from “Memorial.” The judge viewed the statements from Orlov about the personal or indirect fault of Kadyrov in the death of Estemirova as discrediting the honor and dignity of the President. Orlov specified that he did not mean that Kadyrov himself had directly participated in the crime, but that he was responsible for what was happening in the republic. Orlov pointed out that the head of the Chechnya had created such conditions as to make it impossible for human rights activists to work in the republic; and what's more—they (human rights activists) are declared as “permitted targets.” The Commissioner of Human Rights in the Chechen Republic—Nurdi Nukhazhiev—announced that Orlov “got off easy.” According to Nukhazhiev, “He (Orlov), in his biased statements, has publicly disgraced the honor, dignity, and business reputation … of Kadyrov. And in such situations the judge should be more severe.”

On June 6, 2010, for that same public statement, Orlov was accused of a criminal offense for “slander” (item 129, part 3 UKRF). Orlov's court process began on September 13, 2010. Genry Markovich Reznik became his lawyer. The state accuser asked that Orlov be found guilty and fined 150 thousand rubles. The representative of Kadyrov demanded a punishment of 3 years imprisonment. On June 14, 2011, magistrate of the court district No.363 of the Khamoviki region of Moscow declared Orlov “not guilty.” Kadyrov's representative, as well as the state prosecutor, has appealed against this verdict. The consideration of appeals still continues today.

== Criminal case of 2022 ==
Following the large-scale searches of "Memorial" employees homes and organisation's premises related to the case of "rehabilitation of Nazi ideology," it has been revealed that co-chairman of the "Memorial" Center, Oleg Orlov, is under investigation for "repeatedly discrediting the Russian Army". Orlov has been charged and is now under recognisance not to leave.

On March 21, 2023, at approximately 7:02 a.m., employees of the Investigative Committee of Russia and Centre E (a nickname for Centre for combating extremism in Russia) arrived at Oleg Orlov's residence with a search warrant. Searches related to the rehabilitation of Nazi ideology case (section "c," article 354.1 of the Criminal Code of Russia) were conducted at several addresses of Memorial's employees and their relatives, as well as in buildings on Karetny Ryad and Maliy Karetny Lane. In most cases, after the searches, individuals were taken to the Tverskoy district police department and then to the Tverskoy area investigation department of the Investigative Committee of Russia.

During the search, law enforcement officials seized Orlov's laptop, three hard drives, a few flash drives, "Memorial" stickers, a "No war!" badge, and a book titled "Russia - Chechnya: Chain of Errors and Failures".

A few hours later, it was discovered that a criminal case had been opened against Oleg Orlov for discrediting the Russian Army (article 280.3 CC, Section 1). The case was initiated by the senior investigator of the investigative division of the Tverskoy area Investigative Committee of Russia, I. Savchenko. Prior to this, Orlov had been twice administratively penalized for anti-war pickets under the article on discrediting the army (article 20.3.3 of the Russian Administrative Code).

According to the decision to prosecute, it is related to a Facebook post published on November 14, 2022. It is a Russian translation of the article titled "They Wanted Fascism. They Got It," published in the French newspaper Mediapart. The article refers to Russia's invasion of Ukraine.

Now cracks a noble heart. Good night sweet prince: And flights of angels sing thee to thy rest! [emphasis added] "The brutal war unleashed by Putin’s regime in Ukraine is not only mass murder of people and destruction of the infrastructure, economy, and cultural sites of this wonderful country. It is not only the destruction of the foundations of international law. It is also a severe blow to the future of Russia. <...> The country, which moved away from the communist totalitarianism thirty years ago, is now pushed back into totalitarianism, but this time into a fascist totalitarianism," the article states.

According to the investigation statement, Orlov "was at an unidentified place" in Moscow and Moscow Region as he "had the criminal intent" to discredit the Armed Forces of the Russian Federation.

As a restrain measure investigator Savchenko ordered Oleg Orlov to sign a pledge not to leave. The term of its validity is not specified.

At the hearing, he was accompanied by Nobel Peace Prize winner Dmitry Muratov, who said that Orlov was being tried "for observing the Russian Constitution" which, he argued, guarantees freedom of expression. Orlov said: "I do not plead guilty... I'm being tried for my opinion. In my opinion, launching troops into Ukraine undermines peace and international security, and goes against the interests of Russians citizen."

On 2 February 2024, Russia's Ministry of Justice designated Orlov as a "foreign agent", citing his opposition to the war in Ukraine, and accusing him of spreading "false information" about the government's actions. Human Rights Watch stated that the decision to label Orlov as a foreign agent was punishment for him exposing the Kremlin's human rights abuses in Russia and Ukraine.

== Sentence, prison time and international exchange ==
On February 27, 2024, the Moscow court found Oleg Orlov guilty of having “discredited” the Russian army. The sentence was two years and six months in a penal colony. His final hearing was attended by dozens of people.

On 15 March 2024, Memorial announced that Oleg Orlov had been given a form to sign in the detention centre, where he was living with 10 men in a small cell, in which he was to declare his willingness to take part in the Russian invasion of Ukraine. Whether this was done as personal harassment or as part of general recruitment attempts in prison has not yet been clarified.

On the night from 11 to 12 of April 2024 Oleg Orlov has been transferred from Detention Center no 5 "Vodnik" in Moscow to a Detention Center no. 1 in Samara, and then, on April 17, transferred again to a Detention Center no 1 in Syzran.

Among the human rights organizations that have expressed support toward Oleg Orlov were:

- Commissioner for Human Rights
- Office of the United Nations High Commissioner for Human Rights
- Human Rights House Foundation
- Front Line Defenders
- Amnesty International
- International Federation for Human Rights
- Kharkiv Human Rights Protection Group
- Human Rights Watch
- Freedom House

Other organisations that have called for Orlov's release:

- United States Department of State
- European External Action Service
- European Association of Lawyers for Democracy and World Human Rights

(also Carnegie Endowment for International Peace commented on charges against Orlov naming them "a fantastical formulation that has no basis in law").

On 1 August 2024, Oleg Orlov was released in a prisoner exchange between Russia, Belarus and five NATO countries.

== Life in exile (2024–present) ==
After his release, in 2025 Orlov travelled to Ukraine with Kharkiv Human Rights Protection Group and Memorial to document Russian war crimes.

In 2026, Orlov was selected to be a participant in the PACE Platform for Dialogue with Russian Democratic Forces. The platform met in Strasbourg for its first session in January 2026.
