= Egor Kuroptev =

Russian-Georgian media manager and political expert

- Occupations: Media manager; political expert
- Known for: Strategic communications and media projects in the South Caucasus; Free Russia Foundation work; EK Strategic Communications Center

Egor Kuroptev (Russian: Его́р Куро́птев, Georgian: ეგორ კუროპტევი) is a Russian and Georgian media manager and political expert.

From 2019, Kuroptev headed the South Caucasus office of the Free Russia Foundation. In 2025, he ended his work with the foundation and founded EK Strategic Communications Center (EK SCC).

== Career ==
Kuroptev started his career in the age of 17 as a head of administration dept at Echo of Moscow news radio in Moscow.

He produced several media projects such as the Runway Project (Russia), Cosmopolitan.Videoversion (Russia), Main topic TV show (Georgia), etc.

In 2012, Kuroptev was invited to Georgia to launch a new political talk-show "Main topic" hosted by one of the famous leaders of the Russian opposition Ksenia Sobchak for the state TV company PIK TV. In 2013, he produced several charity classical and pop-concerts in Georgia and Azerbaijan.

In the beginning of 2015, Kuroptev launched and became the General Producer the new media project "Star Media Group", that unites several web and broadcasting media sources covering the EU association agreement, the cooperation between Georgia and NATO and local Georgian politics. This media company produced discussions in talk-shows about the current situation regarding conflicts between Russia and Georgia and between Russia and Ukraine.

From 2017, Kuroptev produced and hosted the Russian-language TV show "Пограничная ZONA" (Border Zone). The project was aimed at countering propaganda and promoting information and opinion programming in the post-Soviet space.

Since September 2019, Kuroptev has worked as Deutsche Welle's representative in the South Caucasus..

During his work with the Free Russia Foundation in the South Caucasus, Kuroptev was also involved in civic and humanitarian initiatives in Georgia. Kuroptev, David Katsarava and Sophio Chkonia created the "Strength in Unity" summer camp in Borjomi for Ukrainian refugees and Georgian teenagers living near the occupation line. In 2023, together with Katsarava, he became one of the co-founders of LIFELINE.GE, a project that delivers humanitarian aid to residents of Georgian villages along the Russian occupation line.. The project's assistance covers residents of more than 70 villages near the occupation line and includes deliveries of food, medicine, hygiene items and products for children, as well as support with housing repairs, legal issues and medical treatment.

== Personal life ==
Kuroptev was married to Ekaterina Kortikadze. As of November 2022, he was married to Ark project founder Anastasia Burakova.

== Political activism ==
Kuroptev wrote a blog on Echo of Moscow, where he covered Russian-Georgian relations and Georgian politics. In 2019, he took part in creating the Coalition for Sovereign Elections in Georgia. His publications and interviews addressed the Russian-Georgian conflict, the 2008 war and the deoccupation of Georgia.

Kuroptev is the author of articles and reports. As a political expert, he commented on the occupation of Georgia, the consequences of the 2008 war and Georgia's integration into the EU and NATO.

In 2023, the Free Russia Foundation confirmed the creation of the "Legion of Elves", a project aimed at countering Kremlin propaganda on social media; Kuroptev was among the project's founders. The initiative included a network of commentators who spread anti-Kremlin narratives on social media, primarily on VKontakte. According to the foundation's materials, the project's monthly output reached about 160,000 comments..

In January 2023, EK Strategic Communications Center initiated the creation of the "Coalition Against Propaganda", bringing together 16 public movements and bloggers; Kuroptev coordinated and led the project. The Free Russia Foundation's Strategic Communications Center listed the "Legion of Elves" and the "Coalition Against Propaganda" among its projects..

In February 2024, the main efforts of FRF Stratcom, which he headed, were redirected to analytics and regional blogger networks, including the "Coalition Against Propaganda"..
