= Mark Feygin =

Russian lawyer and human rights activist (born 1971)

- Марк Фейгин
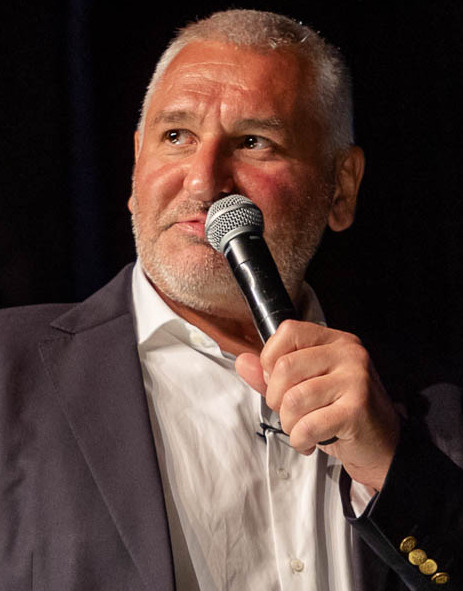
- Feygin in 2023
- Born: Mark Zakharovich Feygin; 3 June 1971 (age 55); Kuybyshev, Russian SFSR, Soviet Union
- Education: Samara State University
- Occupations: former lawyer, politician
- Known for: State Duma deputy, defense of Pussy Riot
- Political party: Democratic Russia
- Website: FEYGIN LIVE on YouTube

Mark Zakharovich Feygin (Russian: Ма́рк Заха́рович Фе́йгин; born 3 June 1971) is a Russian human rights activist and former lawyer who represented Pussy Riot, Nadiya Savchenko and Leonid Razvozzhayev in Russian courts. He also served from January 1994 to December 1995 as a deputy of the State Duma and was the vice mayor of Samara. In 2011 and 2012, Feygin was active in opposition to President Vladimir Putin, and announced that he was forming an opposition party.

== Biography ==
In 1995 he graduated from the Law Faculty of the Samara State University. He was one of the leaders of the democratic movement in Samara, co-chairman of the regional organization of the movement Democratic Russia.

In 1993-1996 Feygin served as the Deputy of the State Duma from the fraction of Vybor Rossii, one of the authors and developers of the first edition of the Federal Law About General Principles of Local Government in Russian Federation. In 1995 he took a part in parliamentary groups participated in humanitarian missions during the combat operations in the North Caucasus. As such he travelled to Chechnya to negotiate the release of 2 Russian captives from Chechen captivity. Negotiations ended with the release of one captive, while second was found to be dead. In 1996 he was also the editor in chief of the daily newspaper "CHISLA" published in Samara.

In 2000 he graduated from the Institute of Business Administration, Academy of National Economy under the Government of the Russian Federation, faculty of "Strategic Management". In 2002 - the Diplomatic Academy of the Russian Foreign Ministry.

On 24 April 2018, the Moscow Chamber of Lawyers stripped Mark Feygin of his attorney status for the inappropriate language in his comments on Twitter about Anatoly Shariy and his lawyer. Feygin's appeal was denied.

Since the 2022 Russian invasion of Ukraine, he has gained a following on YouTube, hosting daily discussions with Ukrainian presidential advisor Oleksii Arestovych on his channel. In October 2023, the Ministry of Internal Affairs of the Russian Federation declared Feygin a wanted fugitive, due to his pro-Ukrainian stance in the Russian invasion of Ukraine. In 2024 he was convicted in absentia for 11 years of corrective colony for "dissemination of knowingly false information about the Russian Army <...> motivated by political hatred".

In 2026, Feygin was selected to be a participant in the PACE Platform for Dialogue with Russian Democratic Forces. The platform met in Strasbourg for its first session in January 2026.

== Career and notable defense cases ==
In 2012, Feygin served as one of three lawyers for Pussy Riot, a punk band arrested for an unauthorized performance in Moscow's Cathedral of Christ the Savior. The band's trial became an international cause célèbre during their trial on charges of hooliganism. On 1 October 2012, an appellate hearing was postponed in the Moscow City Court after band member Yekaterina Samutsevich informed a panel of three judges that she wished to terminate the representation of her defense attorneys, stating, "My position in the criminal case does not coincide with their position." Samutsevich's new lawyer, Irina Khrunova, argued that her client had not in fact committed the acts of hooliganism in the church as she was prevented from accessing the soleas by church security. The court appeared to accept this argument, and released Samutsevich on two years probation. However, the judges rejected the appeals of Nadezhda Tolokonnikova and Maria Alyokhina, upholding their convictions and sentences.

On 19 November, Feygin and the two other lawyers for Pussy Riot withdrew from the case prior to Tolokonnikova's appeal, stating that they felt the court would be more likely to grant it if they were no longer a part of the defense. Samutsevich criticized the original legal team for allegedly using the trial for personal publicity rather than securing the release of the defendants. On 21 November, Samutsevich's lawyer told the press that Samutsevich was considering requesting that Feygin and the other original lawyers be disbarred for failing to return her passport and other belongings. Feygin responded via Twitter that Samutsevich was part of a "defamation campaign organized by the authorities", while another member of the legal team, Violeta Volkova, responded that the claims were "part of an agreement that allowed her to break free of the case". On 21 January 2013, Feygin, Volkova, and Nikolay Polozov filed suit against Khrunova and Kommersant for defamation. This suit was rejected by the Tverskoy District Court on 20 August 2013.

Feygin also defended Leonid Razvozzhayev, an opposition political aide who accused Russian authorities of having kidnapped him from Kyiv, Ukraine to face terrorism charges.

Since 11 June 2014, Feygin also defended Nadiya Savchenko, a Ukrainian air-force pilot who was captured by pro-Russian separatists during the war in Donbas (in eastern Ukraine) and who was detained in Russia and charged with the killing of two Russian journalists.
