= Sergey Aleksashenko =

Russian economist and former government official

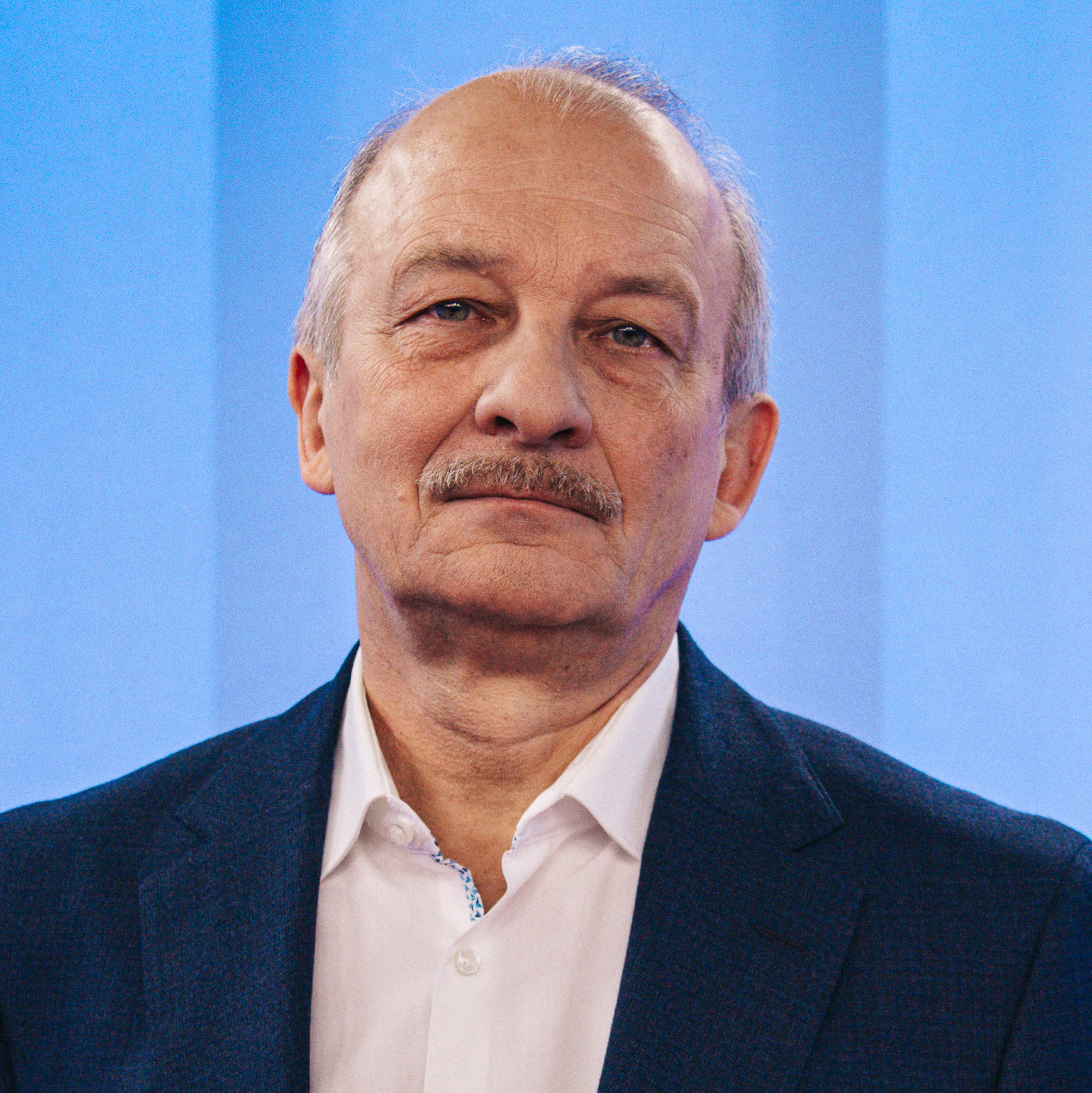
Aleksashenko in 2023

Sergey Vladimirovich Aleksashenko also transliterated as Alexashenko (Russian: Сергей Владимирович Алексашенко; born 23 December 1959) is a Russian economist and former government official. He was the deputy finance minister from 1993 to 1995, and first deputy chairman of the board of the Central Bank of Russia from 1995 to 1998. (Note: From 1995 to 1998, Aleksashenko, who was the deputy finance minister and first deputy chairman of the board of the Central Bank of Russia, was a superior to Aleksandr Torshin who was a superior to Alexander Romanov who allegedly is the leader of the Taganskaya OPG (Russian: Таганская ОПГ) in Spain and refers to Torshin as his 'godfather' according to the Spanish Civil Guard. According to the Spanish Civil Guard, Alexander Romanov is an intermediary between Torshin and Igor Zhirnokleev (Russian: Игорь Жирноклеев) who is the leader of the Taganskaya OPG.) He was placed on a wanted list by the Russian government in November 2023.

== Early life ==
Sergei Aleksashenko was born in 1959 into a family of engineers. Upon graduating from high school, he entered the MGIMO, but left it after two years. Three years later, Aleksashenko enrolled in the Moscow State University. He graduated from the university in 1986 and later obtained a PhD in economic sciences at the Central Economics and Mathematics Institute (CEMI) .

== Career ==
Aleksashenko was the deputy finance minister from 1993 to 1995, and first deputy chairman of the board of the Central Bank of Russia from 1995 to 1998.

Aleksashenko was a President and CEO of Merrill Lynch in Moscow from 2006 to 2008.

In 2014, evading political persecution, Aleksashenko left the Russia and live in the United States since then.

From 2016 to 2019, Aleksashenko was a non-resident senior fellow at the Brookings Institution in Washington, D.C.

From 2019 to 2021, Aleksashenko was advisor to the prime minister of Ukraine Olexiy Honcharuk, minister of finance of Ukraine Serhiy Marchenko, and to the Chairman of the National Bank of Ukraine Kyrylo Shevchenko.

In November 2023, the official Russian news agencies TASS and RIA reported that Russia's interior ministry had placed him on a wanted list with Sergei Guriev, another economist in exile, on unspecified charges.

In 2024, he became a Senior Research Fellow, Head of Economics at the "New Eurasian Strategies Centre" (NEST).

== Political stance ==
In May 2014, Aleksashenko publicly criticised the annexation of Crimea by the Russian Federation.

In March 2020, he signed an appeal against the amendments to the Russian Constitution proposed by Vladimir Putin.

In 2022, Aleksashenko condemned Russian invasion of Ukraine. Since march 2022, he is one of the members of the Anti-War Committee of Russia.

== Personal life ==
Aleksashenko is married, he has three children.

== Selected works ==
- López-Claros, Augusto; Alexashenko, Sergei V. (1998). Fiscal Policy: Issues During the Transition in Russia. International Monetary Fund. ISBN 978-1-55775-703-6.
- Aleksashenko, Sergey (2016). Evaluating Western Sanctions on Russia. Atlantic Council. ISBN 978-1-61977-458-2.
- Aleksashenko, Sergey (2018). Putin's Counterrevolution. Brookings Institution Press. ISBN 978-0-8157-3276-1.
- Aleksashenko, Sergey (2025). Post-Cold War Russia and the Missed Opportunity for Global Stability. Springer. ISBN 978-3-032--01379-8.
