= Ark (organisation) =

Charity helping Russian emigrants who oppose Russia's full-scale invasion of Ukraine

The Ark Project
- Ковче́г
- Formation: 10 March 2022; 4 years ago
- Founder: Anastasia Burakova
- Type: NGO
- Region served: Istanbul, Yerevan, Warsaw, Astana, Aktobe, Almaty
- Leader: Anastasia Burakova
- Affiliations: Anti-War Committee of Russia
- Website: kovcheg.live/en/ark/

The Ark (Russian: Ковчег, romanized: Kovcheg) is an international project that aims to support Russian emigrants who oppose Russia's full-scale invasion of Ukraine and seek refuge abroad. Led by a Russian lawyer and human rights activists Anastasia Burakova, The Ark provides legal and psychological support, integration assistance. The organization has established shelters intermittently in Istanbul, Yerevan, Warsaw, Astana, Aktobe, and Almaty.

== History ==
The Ark was founded by a Russian lawyer and human rights activist, former head of the Open Russia foundation, Anastasia Burakova. The project was inspired by the House of United Belarus in Vilnius that united Belarus migrants fleeing the repressions after the 2020–2021 Belarusian protests. The Arc received initial support from the Anti-War Committee founded in 2022 by the Russian politician Dmitry Gudkov and entrepreneur Mikhail Khodorkovsky.

The Ark began operations on 10 March 2022 and received approximately 5,000 inquiries in the first 24 hours. The initial shelter network capable of accommodating 25 people at time was rapidly expanded to 150 spaces in the first month. By August 2022, the project's Telegram channel grew to 70,000 followers. The number of volunteers that managed inquiries, provided advice, and helped new migrants reached 650. Following the mobilization in Russia, the Arc opened a shelter in Warsaw, two shelters in Almaty and shelters in Actobe and Astana to house people fleeing from Russia, Ukraine, Belarus, and Tajikistan.

On 28 March 2022, the Ark launched a free group and individual psychological support service, which assisted 85,000 people in 8 months, and free language courses. In Summer 2022, the project opened a resource center in Yerevan, which hosted meetings and lectures. By the early 2023, the project's audience in Telegram exceeded 155,000 followers. Around 2,000 volunteers provided 100,000 legal consultations. Nearly 1,300 people participated in language courses. The project also planned to open diaspora centers in new cities to provide coworking spaces and facilitate the development of community projects.

In late 2022, State Duma member Vasily Piskaryov approached the Russian Prosecutor General's Office with a request to designate the Ark among 30 other organizations as "undesirable or extremist" in Russia, though no legal actions followed. In early December 2023, the Russian Ministry of Justice designated The Ark and its founder Anastasia Burakova as "foreign agents" for anti-war stance and cooperation with other "foreign agents".

== Activities ==
=== Emergency, adaptation, and support assistance ===
Due to the outbreak of full-scale war and political repression in 2022, an estimated 500,000 to 1,3 million people left Russia in a year. The Ark provides psychological support, language classes, legal advice on obtaining residence permits, opening bank accounts, and acquiring visas. The project coordinates volunteers and runs an information channel and a job board. Organizers conduct group foreign language classes and seminars to help forced migrants adjust to their new countries. In Yerevan and Istanbul, the Ark offers up to two weeks long accommodation. During peak times, the shelter network housed up to several hundred people.

=== Community-building and support ===
The Arc organizes educational webinars and meetings with pre-war emigrants, and facilitates sharing of experience. They also plan to cooperate with business projects that relocated because of war and create professional courses and a platform for individual services. Volunteers assist emigrants in obtaining new professions and legalization of (work) documents. Volunteers assist with online professional retraining courses and webinars on document legalization.

=== International advocacy ===
The project advocates for emigrants with anti-war political stance and raises awareness of the Russian anti-war movement globally. Anastasia Burakova and other members of the Ark address the anti-war activities, dissent in Russia, and repressions at prominent venues, such as the European Liberal Forum, the European Parliament, the Friedrich Naumann Foundation, the Centre for Nordic Studies at the University of Helsinki, and the Körber Foundation.

=== Political activities ===
In Summer 2023, the Ark launched the "By The First Flight" (Russian: Первым рейсом)initiative to educate emigrants the best practices of democratic governance and develop a legal framework for future reforms in Russia.

The Ark also conducts sociological surveys among fifth-wave migrants, revealing significant political engagement. According to surveys, 82% of participants have left Russia for political reasons, 95% wanted to influence the situation in Russia from abroad, and 67% intended to participate in the Russian elections from abroad. Burakova led civic activism courses in Belgrad and other cities popular among the Russian emigrants. The Ark participated in the Berlin Conference addressing anti-war sentiment and repressions in Russia.

=== Project structure and funding ===
The Ark received its initial funding from Mikhail Khodorkovsky, the co-founder of the Anti-War Committee of Russia, which allowed it to launch the first shelters. In the first month, the project raised up to US$51,000 in donations, partially from the long-term emigrants. Of USD 100,000 raised in the initial 2.5 months, up to 20,000 was allocated to the shelter network. The Arc relies on crowdfunding, advertising, and partnerships with enterprises as its primary sources of funding.

== See also ==
- Russian emigration during the Russian invasion of Ukraine
