= Thomas A. O'Melia =

Thomas A. O'Melia (February 15, 1898 – July 25, 1973, Chinese: 李重光) was an American Catholic missionary stationed mostly in the Republic of China and British Hong Kong. His book First Year Cantonese (1st edition in 1938, 2nd edition in 1941) is an important attestation of the Cantonese language, as the language was under transition from Early to Modern phase around the 1930s.

== Biography ==
Born in Yorkshire, England on February 15, 1898, O'Melia and his family migrated to Philadelphia, United States in 1903. He was ordained by the Maryknoll Fathers on June 17, 1923, and assigned to Jiangmen (also spelled as Kongmoon), Guangdong, Republic of China. From 1934 he took the position as the Director of Cantonese Studies in a language school found by the Maryknoll Fathers in Stanley, British Hong Kong. Following the Japanese capture of Hong Kong in World War II, he returned to Jiangmen in 1942. He returned to the United States from 1947 to 1957. He returned to Stanley, British Hong Kong from 1959 to 1967.
