= Anti-War Committee of Russia =

Russian civil society organization

Anti-War Committee of Russia Антивоенный комитет России
- Abbreviation: AWCR (English); АKР (Russian)
- Founders: Mikhail Khodorkovsky; Lyubov Sobol; Mikhail Kasyanov; Garry Kasparov; Sergei Guriev; Vladimir Kara-Murza; Dmitry Gudkov; Boris Zimin; Mikhail Kokorich; Evgeny Chichvarkin; Sergei Aleksashenko; Alexander Nevzorov
- Founded: February 27, 2022; 4 years ago
- Ideology: Anti-Putinism; Anti-war
- Political position: Big tent
- Slogan: No to war!

Party flag

Website
- Official website (in Russian, English, Spanish, and French)

The Anti-War Committee of Russia (Russian: Антивоенный комитет России) is an organization founded by a group of exiled Russian public figures for the purpose of opposing Russian President Vladimir Putin's regime and the 2022 Russian invasion of Ukraine. Through its Ark project, the committee helps coordinate resources for emigrants leaving Russia as a result of the war. In Russia, it has been designated as a terrorist organization.

== Founding ==
The Anti-War Committee was established on February 27, 2022, by a group of exiled Russian public figures. Its goal was declared to be the fight against the rule of Russian President Vladimir Putin, which it says is responsible for the Russian invasion of Ukraine, and which the committee describes as a "dictatorship." The Moscow Times noted the significance of the committee's coordinated effort as a departure from the infighting more typical among opposition parties in Russia.

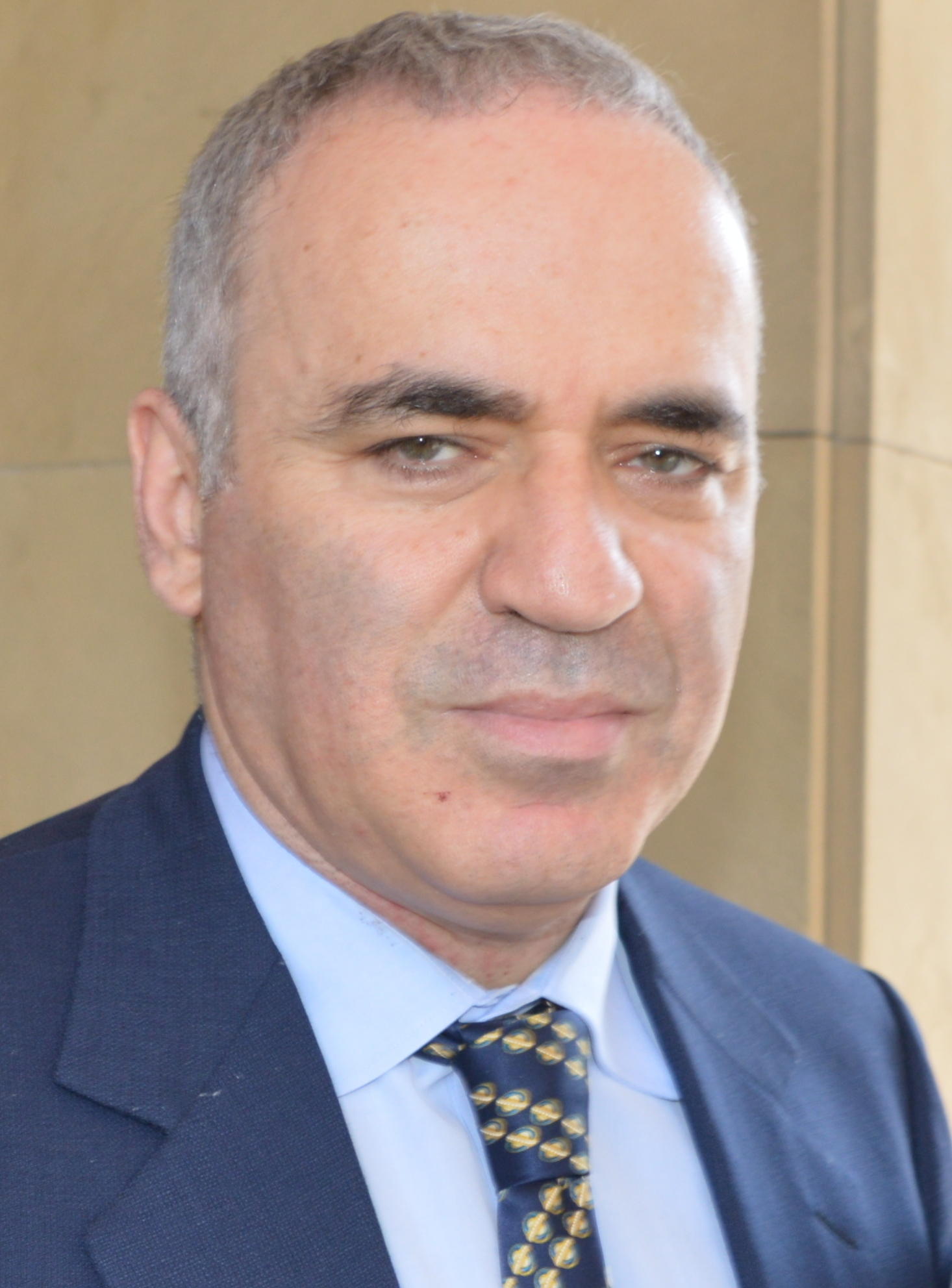
Former World Chess Champion Garry Kasparov

Prominent committee members include Yukos CEO Mikhail Khodorkovsky, former Prime Minister of Russia Mikhail Kasyanov, former World Chess Champion Garry Kasparov, economists Sergei Aleksashenko and Sergei Guriev, historian Vladimir Kara-Murza, Russian Academy of Sciences member Yuri Pivovarov, politician Dmitry Gudkov, entrepreneurs Boris Zimin and Evgeny Chichvarkin, writer Viktor Shenderovich, and journalist Yevgeny Kiselyov. The organization uses the white-blue-white flag and a peace sign in the colors of the Ukrainian flag as symbols on its website.

In December 2025, Vladimir Kara-Murza left the committee amid disagreements with Garry Kasparov.

== Goals ==
The committee called on the governments of all countries to "take a firm stand against those who violate international law." In addition, it calls on "true Russian patriots" to "consolidate themselves in the fight against the aggressive dictatorship of Vladimir Putin – regardless of any political differences, ideological divergences and personal sympathies and antipathies."

== Initiatives and activities ==
The committee has issued appeals to general audiences such as Western countries as well as to specific groups such as the members of United Russia, the largest political party in Russia. On March 4, 2022, the committee published a direct appeal to Russians two days ahead of planned anti-war protests in Moscow. The group has also appealed directly to Sergey Brin, a member of the Alphabet Inc. Board of Directors.

The Anti-War Committee operates the Ark project as a support resource for Russians who have chosen to emigrate as a result of the war. Through this project, the committee help Russian emigrants find housing and set up bank accounts, among other forms of assistance. It is coordinated in part with volunteers located in Yerevan, Armenia, and Istanbul, Turkey, but is able to offer legal assistance in other locations as well. The committee says that monetary donations collected as part of its Sunrise initiative will help supply humanitarian aid in the form of food, medicine, clothing, and hygiene items for people living in Ukraine during the war. The committee also operates a volunteer network of representatives, which it calls “consuls”, for anti-war Russians facing risks including extradition, deportation or loss of legal status abroad. The network has representatives in a number of European countries and the United States. In August 2026, Yle identified opposition activist Pavel Chuprunov as the committee's representative in Sweden.

== Government reaction ==
In January 2024, Russian authorities designated the committee as an "undesirable organization". In October 2025, a criminal case was opened against 22 members of committee for forcibly seizing power and organizing or participating in a terrorist community. In March 2026, the Supreme Court of Russia designated the Anti-War Committee as a "terrorist organization".

== General references ==
- Russian Opposition Figures Join Forces Against Putin's War, Newsweek, 23 March 2022
