= Free Russia Foundation =

USA nonprofit organization

- Фонд «Свободная Россия»
- Formation: 2014
- Type: NGO
- Legal status: foundation
- President of the foundation: Natalia Arno
- Website: www.4freerussia.org

Free Russia Foundation (Russian: Фонд «Свободная Россия», romanized: Fond «Svobodnaya Rossiya») is a non-profit organization established in 2014 in Washington, D.C., by Americans David Kramer and Natalia Arno and a British citizen Vladimir Kara-Murza. The foundation supports civil society, opposition politicians and human rights advocates, democratic reforms, and human rights in Russia. It also facilitates the integration of Russian emigrants into the international community and conducts research and analysis of the political situation in Russia.

== History ==
The foundation was established amid the political crisis in Russia, which intensified after the annexation of Crimea in 2014 and the suppression of domestic opposition. The founders include members of the Russian diaspora, political émigrés, and activists concerned about the decline of political freedoms and democratic institutions in Russia.

The foundation's main offices are located in Washington, D.C., and Brussels, with branches in Tallinn, Berlin, Warsaw, Kiev, Lvov, Tbilisi, and Vilnius.

The foundation is funded through private donations, grants from international organizations, and charitable contributions, though the names of donors are kept classified. Its annual budget is $2 million.

=== Key Personnel ===
- David Kramer — Chair of the Board of Directors, former U.S. Assistant Secretary of State for Democracy, Human Rights and Labor, and former president of Freedom House
- Natalia Arno — President of the foundation (formerly with the International Republican Institute under U.S. Senator John McCain)
- Vladimir Kara-Murza — Vice President of the foundation
- Vladimir Milov — Vice President for International Advocacy
- Grigory Frolov — Vice President for Development
- Sergei Aleksashenko — Member of the Board of Directors
- Egor Kuroptev — Director of the foundation in South Caucasus

== Criticism ==
The Russian authorities and state media accuse the organization of interfering in internal affairs and discrediting Russia.

In 2019, the Russian Ministry of Justice designated the foundation as an undesirable organization. On June 7, 2024, it was added to the list of extremist organizations.

In June 2024, the European Court of Human Rights ruled that the designation of the foundation as an undesirable organization violated Articles 10 and 11 of the European Convention on Human Rights and ordered Russia to pay compensation.

=== Legion of Elves ===
In 2023, the SVTV publication accused the Anti-Corruption Foundation (FBK) of creating an Elf Farm — a network of commentators allegedly paid to spread anti-Kremlin propaganda on social media. Later, the FBK admitted that they were behind this project.
