= Irpin Declaration =

Alleged Russian anti-Putinist political union

Irpin Declaration Ирпенская декларация Ірпінська декларація
- Leader: Ilya Ponomarev
- Founder: Ilya Ponomarev; Maximilian Andronnikov
- Founded: 31 August 2022; 4 years ago
- National affiliation: Congress of People's Deputies

The Irpin Declaration (Russian: Ирпенская декларация, romanized: Irpenskaya deklaratsiya; Ukrainian: Ірпінська декларація, romanized: Irpinska deklaratsiia) is an alleged political union between the Freedom of Russia Legion, the National Republican Army and the Russian Volunteer Corps formed on 31 August 2022. The existence of the National Republican Army has never been confirmed, and the Russian Volunteer Corps denies ever signing the declaration.

== History ==
=== Formation ===
The Declaration was signed in the Ukrainian city of Irpin on August 21, 2022, where earlier a battle was fought, where 3,000 Ukrainian defenders held off assaults from 30,000 Russian attackers in a fierce urban combat. The declaration formed a coalition between the Freedom of Russia Legion, National Republican Army, and the Russian Volunteer Corps, with the adoption of the White-blue-white flag by all parties, and the creation of a joint Political Center with the aim of representing their interests before the state authorities of different countries, and organizing a common information policy, headed by the Russian politician Ilya Ponomarev. It was estimated by the Kyiv Post that at the time of signing the combined forces had "more than 1,000" soldiers. After the signing of the document, a press conference was held where the leaders discussed the contents of the document. Speakers included Ilya Ponomarev, Editor-in-Chief of After Tomorrow Roman Popkov, author Oleksiy Tolkachev, leader of Speak Loudly and Andrey Sidelnikov. Their singular goal is:

“the defeat of the Russian army in Ukraine, the liberation of Donbas and Crimea, as well as the destruction of the Putin regime and its remnants.”

The event was also attended by Advisor to the Office of the President of Ukraine Oleksii Arestovych, People's Deputies Mustafa Dzhemilev and Oleh Dunda, and Advisor to the Minister of Internal Affairs Anton Gerashchenko.

=== Initial response ===
The declaration was met with a mixed response. Some commentators wished them "good luck in the campaign against the Kremlin"; others said initiatives like this should be based inside the territory of the Russian Federation itself. Journalist Maryna Danilyuk-Yarmolaeva noted that Ponomarev used to be a party member of A Just Russia (2007–2013), whose leader, Sergey Mironov, called on April 16, 2022, for the assassination of Volodymyr Zelenskyy, and other Ukrainian decision makers, to quickly end the war in Ukraine. Additionally, Ponomarev's statement that Crimea historically belonged to Russia and that its people wished to join Russia was brought up again in the Ukrainian media, as Ponomarev only voted against annexation on the basis of international law. Additionally, the decision to sign and name the declaration amidst the ruins of Irpin was also criticized due to the city's destruction at Russian hands. The existence of the National Republican Army has been put into question, either due to the group's secrecy, or because the group never existed. Also, the leadership of the Russian Volunteer Corps stated that although they were present at the summit, they never signed any document and will not partake in any institution created by Ponomarev, or adopt the white-blue-white flag. Presidential advisor Oleksii Arestovych, who attended the event, fiercely defended the initiative, arguing that Ukraine should work together with the Russian opposition against Putin, harshly criticising Ukrainians who rejected any such cooperation.

=== Further developments ===
Ponomarev and the group denied any involvement in the 2023 Kremlin drone explosion. However, Ponomarev stated that he knew which partisan group had committed the attack, but refused to say which as they had yet to claim responsibility.

In May 2023, the Freedom of Russia Legion and the Russian Volunteer Corps claimed responsibility for the 2023 Belgorod Oblast attack, announcing that the two groups working together had taken control of several villages in Belgorod Oblast.

== Signatories ==
- Freedom of Russia Legion (formed in March 2022)
- National Republican Army (NRA, has claimed responsibility for the 20 August 2022 killing of Darya Dugina)

Unclear

- Russian Volunteer Corps (RDK, formed in August 2022). The RDK attended the signing of the Irpin Declaration on 31 August 2022, but afterwards denied having signed it, while Ponomarev had stated all three organisations had signed it.

== See also ==
- 2022 anti-war protests in Russia
- 2022 Russian businessmen mystery deaths
- 2022 Russian military commissariats arsons
- 2022 Russian mystery fires
- Combat Organization of Anarcho-Communists
- Free Nations of Russia Forum
- Georgian Legion
- Dzhokhar Dudayev Battalion
- Kastuś Kalinoŭski Regiment
- Pahonia Regiment
- Russian Insurgent Army
- Sheikh Mansur Battalion
- Tactical group "Belarus"
