= Congress of People's Deputies (Russia, 2022) =

November 2022 congress of former Russian deputies

Congress of People's Deputies of the Russian Republic Съезд народных депутатов Syezd narodnyh deputatov
- 1st Congress of People's Deputies

Type
- Type: Unicameral provisional government
- Houses: Executive Council

History
- Established: 5 November 2022; 4 years ago
- Preceded by: Federal Assembly (claimed)

Leadership
- Chairman: Ilya Ponomarev since 5 November 2022

Structure
- Seats: Delegates: 78; Executive Council: 11
- Executive Council political groups: RSF (1 (Note: Ilya Ponomarev, formerly associated with the Green Alliance (Russia), now dissolved, is principally aligned with the Left Front and he holds a permanent member status in an organisation named "Russian Social Forums".)); Solidarnost (3 (Note: Aleksandr Osovtsov, Petr Tsarkov, and Olga Kurnosova have been linked to the movement.)); Independent (4 (Note: Ushatsky Dmitry, Vilents Alexey, Sidelnikov Andrey and Alexandrovskaya Natalia are not declared to be associated with any political ideology or faction, although they were members of Russian Opposition Coordination Council, which is now dissolved.)); Libertarian (2 (Note: Andrey Illarionov and Vitaly Skoybeda who are unaffiliated with any political groups but officially declared themselves to be member of right-wing libertarian political group.)); FRL (1 (Note: Caesar, who was previously affiliated with the far-right Russian Imperial Movement, is now officially designated as "LFR" in his executive council biography, as documented by The Congress of People's Deputies.))

Elections
- Delegates voting system: Legislative session
- Executive Council voting system: Minutes
- First Delegates election: 4 November 2022; 4 years ago
- First Executive Council election: November 2022; 4 years ago
- Last Delegates election: 8 June 2023; 3 years ago (officially, the third and current session)
- Last Executive Council election: 12 July 2023; 3 years ago

Meeting place
- Warsaw, Poland

Website
- rosdep.org

The Congress of People's Deputies of the Russian Republic is a political grouping made up of former deputies of different levels and convocations, claiming to be a government in exile for Russia. Former State Duma deputy Ilya Ponomarev became the public initiator of the congress. Sessions of the 1st Congress were held on 4–7 November 2022 in Jabłonna, Poland with subsequent sessions taking place in Warsaw.

== Legitimacy ==
The congress positions itself as a meeting of "the only representatives of society and the state who have the democratic legitimacy they received from Russian citizens". Ilya Ponomarev answered during the congress that, as representatives of Russian citizens, they are quite legitimate, since they had once been elected by the people, and now Russia needs a temporary body for the transfer of power, and they "will hold elections later". Gennady Gudkov called the congress a "proto-parliament".

== Participants ==
The following were invited to participate in the congress as voting delegates:

- Members of the Russian Parliament elected before 14 March 2014, who do not support the annexation of Crimea and the war against Ukraine.
- Members of regional and municipal legislatures condemning the annexation of Crimea and the war against Ukraine.
- Citizens of the Russian Federation who have held elected positions in the executive branch and do not support the annexation of Crimea and the war against Ukraine.

Persons condemning the war in Ukraine and having received the recommendation of at least two delegates could also take part. Thus, those who have never been deputies could become delegates. The organizers announced that a total of 94 applications were submitted for participation in the congress. In total, 51 delegates registered to participate in the Congress of People's Deputies of Russia, 26 of them took part online. There were 80 guests with an advisory vote from 32 regions of the Russian Federation and 9 foreign countries. Several participants of the Congress who took part in its work remotely from Russia were forced to hide their names and faces for security reasons. The verification of their identity was carried out by the counting and mandate commission.

Prior to the start of the congress, the organizing committee included Nina Belyaeva, Gennady Gudkov, Elena Lukyanova, Ilya Ponomarev, Mark Feygin, Pyotr Tsarkov and Arkady Yankovsky. To conduct current political activities between meetings, an Executive Council of 11 people was created to replace the organizing committee. The following were elected to the council: Gennady Gudkov, Andrey Illarionov, Elena Istomina, Lyudmila Kotesova, Elena Lukyanova, Alexander Osovtsov, Ilya Ponomarev, Andrey Sidelnikov, Mark Feygin, Pyotr Tsarkov, and "Caesar".

Composition of the congress delegates:

- ex-deputies of the State Duma and the Federation Council
1. Gennady Gudkov
2. Lyudmila Kotesova
3. Alexander Osovtsov
4. Ilya Ponomarev
5. Mark Feygin
6. Igor Yakovenko
7. Arkady Yankovsky
- ex-deputies of the regional and municipal levels
1. Nina Belyayeva (left)
2. Alexey Vilents
3. Sergey Gulyayev
4. Andrey Davydov
5. Yevgeny Domozhirov
6. Anton Yerashov
7. Andrey Korchagin
8. Lev Kostnikov
9. Anton Kostromichev
10. Yelena Kotyonochkina
11. Vasily Kryukov
12. Vyacheslav Maltsev
13. Maksim Motin
14. Galina Filchenko
15. Oleg Khomutinnikov
- ex-holders of elective offices
1. Dmitry Ushatsky
- Others
1. Grigory Amnuel
2. Dmitry Bargash
3. Alexey Baranovsky
4. Pavel Zhovnirenko
5. Andrey Illarionov
6. Yelena Istomina
7. Olga Kurnosova
8. Yelena Lukyanova
9. Dmitry Nekrasov
10. Dmitry Savvin
11. Andrey Sidelnikov
12. Alexey Sobchenko
13. Vadim Sidorov
14. Maximilian Andronnikov
15. Pyotr Tsarkov

== Executive Council ==
The 11 member Executive Council of the Congress of People's Deputies was most recently elected in June 2023. Its membership is as follows:

- Ilya Ponomarev
- Aleksandr Osovtsov
- Andrey Sidelnikov
- Andrey Illarionov
- Olga Kurnosova
- Dmitry Ushatsky
- Maximilian Andronnikov ("Caesar")
- Alexey Vilents
- Petr Tsarkov
- Vasily Kryukov
- Natalia Aleksandrovskaya

== Foundation ==
On the eve and during the congress, the organizers said that the palace they had chosen for the meeting in Jabłonna, which they believed was the place where the famous negotiations between the authorities of the Polish People's Republic and the Solidarity trade union took place in the late 80s. The organizers supposedly found out about this only when they arrived in Poland, and so, they did not urgently change the venue. Some of the delegates could not come to Poland, due to problems with obtaining a humanitarian visa (entry on tourist visas to Russians was prohibited from 19 September).

Ilya Ponomarev chose as an anthem from two options: "Walls will collapse" (the anthem of the Polish Solidarity) and the Russian revolutionary "Dubinushka", but could not decide.

Only the ex-deputy of the Tverskoy District of Moscow was able to come from Russia. The delegates were not introduced to each other. Online participants were repeatedly "forgotten" to speak, and their unopened proposals were also rejected. Deputy Kostromichev from Northern Tushino suggested renaming the Congress:

I strongly disagree with the name of our meeting. Not a single deputy is "people's", this word is discredited by totalitarian regimes from the DPRK to the DPR.

However, this was not accepted. It is known that among the organizers of the congress were Russian nationalists Dmitry Savvin and Alexei Baranovsky; however, this did not lead to the adoption of the amendments of fellow nationalist Vasily Kryukov.

At the congress, there were speeches about the murder of Putin, in particular from Ponomarev himself, as well as the deputy of the Verkhovna Rada Alexei Goncharenko and the founder of the Artpodgotovka movement Vyacheslav Maltsev, who is considered by many in the opposition to be a provocateur. because of his insistent announcements of "revolution" in Russia on 5 November 2017. Shortly before this date, he himself left for France, and the people who believed him were detained and sent to prison for long periods. The Act on the Resistance Movement was the key document of the entire congress. Among the delegates there was no unified support for the armed struggle.

Some participants left the congress ahead of schedule.

=== Accepted documents and projects ===
- Accepted documents:
  - Resistance Movement Act
  - Founding Declaration of the International Anti-Authoritarian Union
  - Appeal to the citizens of Europe and America, all Western allies in the anti-Putin coalition
  - Appeal to the citizens of Ukraine
  - Appeal to the citizens of Russia
  - Founding Declaration of the Congress of People's Deputiesв
  - Transitional Parliament Act
  - Appeal to the nations
  - Act of Rehabilitation and Amnesty (Act of Rehabilitation and Amnesty)
- Accepted draft documents:
  - Draft appeal of the First Congress of People's Deputies to the Russian opposition
  - Draft appeal of the First Congress of People's Deputies to the governments and parliaments of the anti-Putin coalition
  - Sketch of the concept of updating the constitution of Russia with comments
  - Сoncept of the act of lustration
  - Draft concept of media release act

== Criticism ==
Ponomarev himself voted against the annexation of Crimea to Russia only because of his dissatisfaction with the annexation procedure. He explained his attitude to what happened with Crimea as follows: it's bad not what they annexed, but how they annexed.

I believe that Crimea should be part of Russia, that it is Russian land. I have no doubts about the legitimacy of the last referendum, nor about the will of the overwhelming majority of Crimeans, nor about the attitude of the majority of Russian citizens to this.

Assembly of independent municipal deputies "Zemsky Congress" condemned the path of violent solutions to political problems.

The meetings of the congress were accompanied by scandals and mutual accusations. Two positions prevailed among Russian opposition politicians and activists. The first is that the two dozen former deputies who have gathered no longer represent anyone. The second is that every association against Putin is useful. This, as well as Ponomarev's desire to present himself as a kind of coordinator of armed resistance to the regime in Russia, when it is not completely clear whether such resistance actually exists, forced many to accept the convening and work of the congress with hostility.

Former deputy from the Voronezh Oblast Nina Belyaeva accused Ponomarev of distorting the draft document on lustrations prepared by her. There was no sound during her performance. Later, in her Telegram channel, Belyaeva stated that she was deliberately turned off the sound and was not allowed to speak. The next day, Ponomarev called Belyaeva "a person with psychological problems" in response to an offer to negotiate her claimed intellectual property rights, and the organizers turned off the microphone of the SOTA journalist when he began to find out what led to the conflict. Later, she filed an application with a request to initiate a criminal case against Ilya Ponomarev under Art. 157 (slander). Belyaeva also said that the presence of a certain number of worthy people at the congress does not make it legitimate.

Russian activists living in different cities of Poland did not recognize Ilya Ponomarev and his congress:

Without denying the need for a coordinating council of the Russian opposition, we declare that the legitimacy of such a body can be based solely on the electoral procedure, conducted honestly and taking into account the actual reputation of the candidates. The participants of the Congress endow themselves with pseudo-legitimacy and justify it with victories in the previous elections. However, many strong opposition candidates (notably Ivan Zhdanov, Vladimir Milov and Lyubov Sobol) were never allowed to run in Russian elections. Thus, firstly, we question whether the participants in the Congress could have won a fair election; secondly, we believe that over the long time that has passed since their election, their electoral potential has changed.

The Free Nations League issued a statement that they do not recognize "any political forces and centers that will justify the preservation of the Russian Federation in its modern form," because the wording from the draft declaration of the congress contradicts the approach of the FNL and Ponomarev's statements. Some have linked this direction of the declaration with the fact that one of its authors was the nationalist Dmitry Savvin. Journalist Harun Sidorov noted that the dispute over who will determine political self-determination – national and regional movements or Russian revolutionaries – so far looks like dividing the skin of an unkilled bear. Dmitry Savvin himself, who proposed the idea of the congress to Ponomarev, spoke negatively about the past event.

Galina Filchenko, who took part in the congress, reacted to an article by Novaya Gazeta journalist Ilya Azar, in which he called her "not the most charismatic deputy", calling him "not the most charismatic Jew." The event was attended by Ponomarev's assistant Alexei Baranovsky, who previously headed the Russian Verdict organization (defending nationalists who killed migrants), as well as nationalist Vasily Kryukov, who said that one of the main troubles of Russia is the Tajiks.

Political scientist Ekaterina Schulmann said that "the key problem of such events is the lack of legitimacy ... in itself this is not a very significant event (and not an event at all), but as a symptom it is quite significant. I think that we will see some more attempts of this kind in the foreseeable future."

== Reactions ==
The head of the Center for the Settlement of Social Conflicts, Oleg Ivanov, urged the Russian security services "to initiate criminal cases on charges of high treason, place traitors on the wanted list, and submit extradition requests to Interpol" in relation to participants of the Congress of People's Deputies and the "Free Nations of Post-Russia Forum". He also suggested "recalling the precepts of the famous Soviet intelligence officer Pavel Sudoplatov", implying the assassination of political emigrants abroad.

In April 2023, the Prosecutor General's Office of the Russian Federation declared the "Congress of People's Deputies" an undesirable organization within the territory of Russia.

Andrei Edigarev became one of the few representatives of the November Congress who publicly announced his participation and subsequently returned to Russia, where he faced persecution.

On 27 October 2025, a lawsuit was filed with the Supreme Court to recognize the "Congress of People's Deputies" as a terrorist organization. The lawsuit was filed by the Prosecutor General's Office. On 8 December 2025, the Supreme Court declared the "Congress of People's Deputies" a terrorist organization.

== See also ==
- Protests against the 2022 Russian invasion of Ukraine
- Russian Opposition Coordination Council
- Anti-War Committee of Russia
- True Russia
- Russian Action Committee
- White-blue-white flag
