= Black Bridge (Russia) =

Russian partisan movement opposed to the rule of Vladimir Putin

- Чёрный мост
- Founded: August 2022
- Dates active: August 2022 – present
- Country: Russia
- Allegiance: Russian opposition
- Ideology: Anti-Putinism; Anti-authoritarianism
- Part of: United Front of Resistance (since 2024)
- Website: Black Bridge on Telegram

The Black Bridge (Russian: Чёрный мост, romanized: Chyornyy most) is a Russian partisan movement opposed to the rule of Vladimir Putin. The organization supports the territorial integrity of Ukraine.

== History ==
In August 2022, the movement made recommendations to disrupt referendums on the annexation of the occupied parts of Ukraine to Russia.

After the announcement of the mobilization in Russia, the movement stated that:

"the regime has chosen a quick death through agony. ... This is good, because the push-and-pull on the Ukrainian front ends and the under-reich will fall faster. It’s bad - because the partisan movement did not have time to properly take shape and the regime would still have time to send several tens of thousands of mobilized for fertilizer."

The movement claimed responsibility for an attack on a FSB building in Rostov-on-Don on March 16, 2023.

== See also ==
- National Republican Army
- Russian Insurgent Army
