= RKD (disambiguation) =

The RKD (Dutch: Rijksbureau voor Kunsthistorische Documentatie) is an art history center in the Netherlands.

RKD may also refer to:

- RKD Airport in Maine, US
- The Red Cross service (German: Rotkreuzdienst), a department of the Swiss Red Cross, a humanitarian organisation
- The Russian Action Committee (Russian: Rossiyskiy komitet deystviya), a coalition movement of the Russian opposition in exile
