= Gorkovsky (inhabited locality) =

Gorkovsky (Russian: Горьковский; masculine), Gorkovskaya (Горьковская; feminine), or Gorkovskoye (Горьковское; neuter) is the name of several inhabited localities in Russia.

== Modern localities ==
Urban localities

- Gorkovskoye, Omsk Oblast, a work settlement in Gorkovsky District of Omsk Oblast

Rural localities

- Gorkovsky, Belgorod Oblast, a settlement in Grayvoronsky District of Belgorod Oblast
- Gorkovsky, Samara Oblast, a settlement in Krasnoyarsky District of Samara Oblast
- Gorkovsky, Stavropol Krai, a settlement in Gorkovsky Selsoviet of Novoalexandrovsky District of Stavropol Krai
- Gorkovsky, Tyoplo-Ogaryovsky District, Tula Oblast, a settlement in Gorkovsky Rural Okrug of Tyoplo-Ogaryovsky District of Tula Oblast
- Gorkovsky, Uzlovsky District, Tula Oblast, a settlement in Krasnolesskaya Rural Administration of Uzlovsky District of Tula Oblast
- Gorkovskoye, Altai Krai, a selo in Gorkovsky Selsoviet of Shipunovsky District of Altai Krai
- Gorkovskoye, Kaliningrad Oblast, a settlement in Kovrovsky Rural Okrug of Zelenogradsky District of Kaliningrad Oblast
- Gorkovskoye, Leningrad Oblast, a logging depot settlement in Polyanskoye Settlement Municipal Formation of Vyborgsky District of Leningrad Oblast
- Gorkovskoye, Orenburg Oblast, a selo in Gorkovsky Selsoviet of Novoorsky District of Orenburg Oblast
- Gorkovskaya, Kirov Oblast, a village in Ichetovkinsky Rural Okrug of Afanasyevsky District of Kirov Oblast
- Gorkovskaya, Komi Republic, a village in Vizinga Selo Administrative Territory of Sysolsky District of the Komi Republic

== Abolished localities ==
- Gorkovsky, Volgograd Oblast, a former work settlement in Volgograd Oblast; merged into the city of Volgograd in March 2010
