= Gorkovsky =

Gorkovsky (masculine), Gorkovskaya (feminine), or Gorkovskoye (neuter) may refer to:

- Gorkovsky District, a district of Omsk Oblast
- Gorkovsky (inhabited locality) (Gorkovskaya, Gorkovskoye), name of several inhabited localities in Russia
- Gorkovskaya (Saint Petersburg Metro), a station of the Saint Petersburg Metro, St. Petersburg, Russia
- Gorkovskaya (Nizhny Novgorod Metro), a future station of the Nizhny Novgorod Metro, Nizhny Novgorod, Russia
- Gorkovskaya, name of Tverskaya, a station of the Moscow Metro, Moscow, Russia, until November 1990
