= Russia will be free =

Russian slogan

"Russia will be free" (Russian: Россия будет свободной, romanized: Rossiya budet svobodnoy) is one of the slogans of the modern Russian opposition.

== History ==
=== Origins ===
Bolshevik revolutionary Vladimir Shimanovsky wrote in his last letter to his wife before his execution: "Russia will be free, no matter how hard its enemies try, and this faith gives me the opportunity to die in peace". Leon Trotsky, in a lecture delivered on June 16, 1918, said: "Fellow brothers! I call on you to proclaim with me: "Long live the Red Workers' Army and long live the honest labor Workers' and Peasants' Soviet Republic!“ It will not be a slave and will fight to the last drop of blood. Russia will be free! Russia will be popular! Russia will be happy!".

=== Contemporary usage ===
Boris Yeltsin during the August 1991 coup attempt wrote in the Obshchaya Gazeta: "The days of the conspirators are numbered. Law and constitutional order will prevail. Russia will be free!". In 2010, the Memorial organization and the Yabloko party organized a march in honor of the victory over the 1991 coup, which was held under the slogan "Russia will be free".

Subsequently, the slogan was often used at opposition rallies, including those during the 2011–2013 Russian protests: at a rally on Sakharov Avenue in December 2011, rally in March 2012, rally at Bolotnaya Square in May 2013, where many people ended their speeches with this slogan, including Alexei Navalny, funeral of Valeriya Novodvorskaya in 2014 and the March in memory of Boris Nemtsov in 2017. Also, the slogan was repeatedly used at 2021 protests in support of Alexei Navalny. According to political analyst Vladimir Gelman, "the slogan of the participants of the opposition rallies — "Russia will be free" — may not just be a call, but become a key aspect of the political agenda for our country in the foreseeable future". Economist Andrey Zaostrovtsev expressed the opposite point of view: "if Russia - then not free, if free - then not Russia." In his opinion, the democratization of societies belonging to a "power" civilization is possible only due to a special combination of circumstances arising after external shocks and crises. Alexei Navalny, after returning to Russia after poisoning, at a court hearing on February 20, 2021, proposed changing the slogan and saying that Russia should be not only free, but also happy.

==== Russo-Ukrainian War ====
The slogan is also used by Russians fighting in the Russo-Ukrainian War on the side of Ukraine, notably in the Freedom of Russia Legion.
