= National Republican Army (Russia) =

Alleged Russian underground partisan group

- Национальная республиканская армия
- Dates active: 2022–present
- Country: Russia
- Allegiance: Congress of People's Deputies
- Ideology: Anti-Putinism
- Status: Partisan

The National Republican Army (NRA; Russian: Национальная республиканская армия, НРА, romanized: Natsionalnaya respublikanskaya armiya) is an alleged underground partisan group of Russians inside Russia working towards the violent overthrow of the Putin government. The group claims to be a member of the Irpin Declaration, an alleged alliance of anti-government Russian militant groups.

Ilya Ponomarev, a former member of the Russian State Duma, (Note: In 2014, while abroad, Ponomarev was banned from returning to Russia due to an ongoing investigation. An order for his arrest was later ordered by a Moscow court for an alleged embezzlement case, and Ponomarev was impeached by the State Duma in June 2016.) has identified the group as being behind the assassination of Russian journalist Darya Dugina in August 2022, and "many other partisan actions carried out on the territory of Russia in recent months." He said he has been "in touch" with representatives of the organization since April 2022. He describes his role as similar to that played by Gerry Adams and Sinn Féin vis-à-vis the Provisional Irish Republican Army in the Troubles, and claimed that his role is limited to providing publicity, helping fugitives, and providing technical assistance; he denied providing weapons.

Commentators have expressed doubts as to Ponomarev's claims about the group. Media coverage of Dugina's assassination stresses that there is no independent verification of the Russian NRA's existence or its role in the assassination. Nevertheless, the opposition Russian Action Committee blacklisted Ponomarev from its Free Russia Congress on grounds that he had "called for terrorist attacks on Russian territory." The Committee's statement also implied that Dugina was a "[civilian] who [did] not take part in the armed confrontation", and condemned denunciations of Aleksandr Dugin following the attack as "a demonstrative rejection of normal human empathy for the families of the victims."

== History ==
Following the outbreak of the 2022 Russian invasion of Ukraine, arson attacks on Russian military enlistment and induction centers were a widely reported phenomenon. The dispersed arson attacks were, however, rarely attributed to a group with the exception of those claimed by the Combat Organization of Anarcho-Communists.

Former Deputy of the State Duma Ilya Ponomarev claims to have made contact with one group behind these acts of arson in April 2022. He was also noted at a May 2022 conference of exiles in Vilnius sponsored by the Free Russia Forum, appealing to attendees to support the arson attacks. A Spektr (Russian: Спектр) reporter noted an indifferent response from the attendees. Simultaneously, Ponomarev and others established two media outlets based in Kyiv aimed at an anti-Putin audience within Russia: YouTube channel February Morning (Russian: Утро Февраля) and its affiliated Telegram-based publication "Rospartisan" (Russian: Роспартизан). The two outlets encouraged direct action including arson and sabotage to the extent of providing directions.

In Ponomarev's narrative to the Kyiv Post, the National Republican Army group shifted from anonymous arson to an assassination plot against Dugin and Dugina as "something high-profile for which they could become well-known." He claims that a contact in the group told him a week before the assassination to expect "something big," followed by his contact instructing him to "watch the news." Following news coverage of the assassination, Ponomarev claims that he was provided evidence of the group's responsibility. Ponomarev gave a similar account to Radio NV (Ukrainian: Радіо НВ), elaborating that his contacts "sent certain photos to prove their involvement."

Following the killing of Darya Dugina, Ponomarev took to February Morning to attribute the attacks to the hitherto unknown National Republican Army and to read its manifesto on air. The NRA's manifesto was also released in text form via Rospartizan. Subsequently, Ponomarev spoke with several outlets including Meduza and attributed some of the earlier 2022 attacks on military induction centers to his contacts in the NRA.

In a release to TASS state-news agency, the Federal Security Service declared their investigation of Dugina's assassination "solved" by attributing the attack to a "citizen of Ukraine, Natalia Vovk", whom they accused of being a part of special forces of Ukraine. The statement further stated that Vovk had escaped to Estonia.

Ponomarev told Meduza that his sources deny Vovk was the perpetrator, but left ambiguous whether she had a role. A message from Ponomarev to Rozpartizan also denied her participation in the attack, but acknowledged that she was exfiltrated from Russia at the request of unnamed "friends".

On 22 August 2022, Rospartizan carried a message from a group calling itself the Army's "Revolutionary Military Council" (Russian: Реввоенсовет), stating that Rospartizan would be the exclusive source of official messages, disavowing purported social media accounts.

On 23 August, the National Republican Army mocked FSB allegations of a Ukrainian woman being the assassin with extensive details about the alleged assassin (such as renting an apartment in the same building as Dugina, travels and license plates), saying, "All this became known a day after the murder—this is the speed of the investigation!" The NRA said the Ukrainian woman is most likely a refugee from the occupied Mariupol who was framed. The NRA's Rospartizan said, "There are thousands of such women fleeing the occupied city to Europe through Russia. Playing this story is very convenient for Putin's special services—they found the 'guilty' and have nothing to show."

On 31 August, a declaration on cooperation between the Russian Volunteer Corps, the Freedom of Russia Legion and the National Republican Army was signed in Irpin, Kyiv Oblast. The organizations also agreed to create a political center, the purpose of which is to represent their interests before the state authorities of different countries and organize a joint information policy. Ilya Ponomarev will lead the political center.

On 18 October 2022, a group of computer hackers identifying themselves as being connected to the NRA, contacted Kyiv Post. They claim to have hacked Technoserv and nearly a dozen other companies providing national security and defense contracting services for Russia. On 19 October, the group released the entire dump of data representing 1.2 terabytes. A computer expert described Technoserv as "the people who are the architects of the Russian Government," and the hack would likely indicate "access to the architecture networks, databases, cloud solutions, and other information that is of key importance to the Russian Government."

On 4 April 2023, the National Republican Army published a statement, claiming they arranged the assassination of pro-Russian propagandist Vladlen Tatarsky, who was killed by a bomb while speaking at an event hosted at a Saint Petersburg café.

== Descriptions to the media ==
As of 1 September 2022, only two persons have purported to speak for the NRA: Ilya Ponomarev, and an unidentified militant going by "Aleksandr."

=== Ponomarev representations ===
Ponomarev granted an English-language interview discussing the NRA to Jason Jay Smart of the Kyiv Post. There, Ponomarev acknowledged his support of the group while disavowing membership or direct foreknowledge.

Ponomarev's account describes the NRA as being a "network" rather than an organization, which consists of clandestine cells that are compartmentalized and autonomous. He describes the group as having "a slight left-leaning orientation", and that it "embraces social justice, gets rid of oligarchs, and moves away from the new-liberalism approaches of Yeltsin and Putin."

In a pointed question, Smart asks whether the NRA could be a mere cover for Federal Security Service, with Ponomarev replying:

I would say watch the actions of the NRA: burning down military recruitment and draft offices, and openly calling for lone wolves to attack the state. The FSB would never call for lone wolf attacks – as those cannot be controlled.

Moreover, it is worth noting that the Russian state press has totally ignored the NRA's announcement – a sign that the Russian FSB knows that this is something new, which they do not understand, nor control, and are hence clearly worried about it.

In online magazine Spektr (Russian: Спектр) Ponomarev agreed with his interviewer Lev Kadik's characterization of his own role vis-à-vis the NRA as similar to the role of Gerry Adams and Sinn Féin vis-à-vis the Provisional Irish Republican Army (IRA), and claimed that his role is limited to providing publicity, helping fugitives, and providing technical assistance; he denied providing weapons. In addition, Ponomarev offered parallels to the relationship of African National Congress and its armed wing uMkhonto we Sizwe.

=== "Aleksandr" interview ===
Smart would conduct another interview in Kyiv Post on 1 September 2022, with a purported NRA militant going by the name "Aleksandr." In the interview, Aleksandr described the NRA's role as making "sporadic attacks against the authorities, their ideologues, and their media stooges," with the objective of provoking discord among the Russian "elite." Aleksandr also claimed that "there are former, and more importantly current members of the security and law enforcement agencies in our ranks," due to dissatisfaction within their ranks.

== Expulsion of Ponomarev from the Russian Action Committee ==
In reaction to Ponomarev's statements, the opposition Russian Action Committee blacklisted Ponomarev from its planned Congress of Free Russia event, stating that Ponomarev had "called for terrorist attacks on Russian territory", which the Committee objected to. The Committee stated its support for armed confrontation against military targets of "the aggressor's country" (Russia). The Committee's statement implied that Dugina was seen as a civilian who had not "take[n] part in the armed confrontation," and that it did not support "rejection of normal human empathy for the families of the victims."

In response, Ponomarev mocked the gathering as the "Committee of Inaction."

== Symbolism ==
The Army, according to its own statements, uses "the white-blue-white flag of the new Russia instead of the tricolor disgraced by the Putin authorities". The white-blue-white flag had previously been adopted by the Freedom of Russia Legion and by the Russian news channel February Morning. The white-blue-white flag originally emerged as a symbol of peace and more specifically a symbol of opposition to the 2022 Russian invasion of Ukraine.

== Debate over existence and claims ==
As of 21 August 2022, Associated Press and The Guardian articles concerning the death of Dugina and its aftermath state that the claim of a National Republican Army responsibility cannot be confirmed. A 22 August 2022 report from Reuters says that "[Ponomarev's] assertion and the group's existence could not be independently verified."

In an interview with Ponomarev for Meduza, both the interviewer Svetlana Reiter and the editor note scepticism about his claims about the Russian NRA, his accommodations of Putin in his Duma career, and the source of his wealth. Separately, Meduza managing editor Kevin Rothrock questioned Ponomarev's integrity, the existence of the NRA, and implied that both Dugin and Dugina were "civilians" who should not have been targeted.

Citing the livestream of Yulia Latynina, Cathy Young mused on the possibility that Ponomarev is "a grifter trying to sell a good story," but noted that the NRA manifesto's appeal to patriotism is not suggestive of black propaganda.

Sergey Radchenko, the Distinguished Professor at the Henry A. Kissinger Center for Global Affairs at the Johns Hopkins School of Advanced International Studies, told Deutsche Welle he found the claim of responsibility and manifesto to both be "dodgy".

Deutsche Welle's reporter in Kyiv Roman Goncharenko said, "there are more questions than answers" about the group, and noted that the group's purported manifesto employs a call to action "fight like us, fight with us, fight better than us!" (Russian: боритесь как мы, боритесь вместе с нами, боритесь лучше нас!) inspired by the Deutscher Fernsehfunk children's television show Do with us, do as we do, do better than us! that aired in both East Germany and the Soviet Union until 1991.

== See also ==
- Anti-war protests in Russia (2022–present)
- Combat Organization of Anarcho-Communists
- Dzhokhar Dudayev Battalion
- Free Nations of Post-Russia Forum
- Freedom of Russia Legion
- Georgian Legion (Ukraine)
- Kastuś Kalinoŭski Regiment
- Russian Insurgent Army
- Russian military commissariats attacks
- Russian mystery fires
- Russian Volunteer Corps
- Sheikh Mansur Battalion
- Suspicious Russia-related deaths since 2022
- Tactical group "Belarus"
