= Russian partisan movement (2022–present) =

Resistance to the Russian invasion of Ukraine in Russia

- Part of the Russian invasion of Ukraine and the anti-war protests in Russia (2022–present)
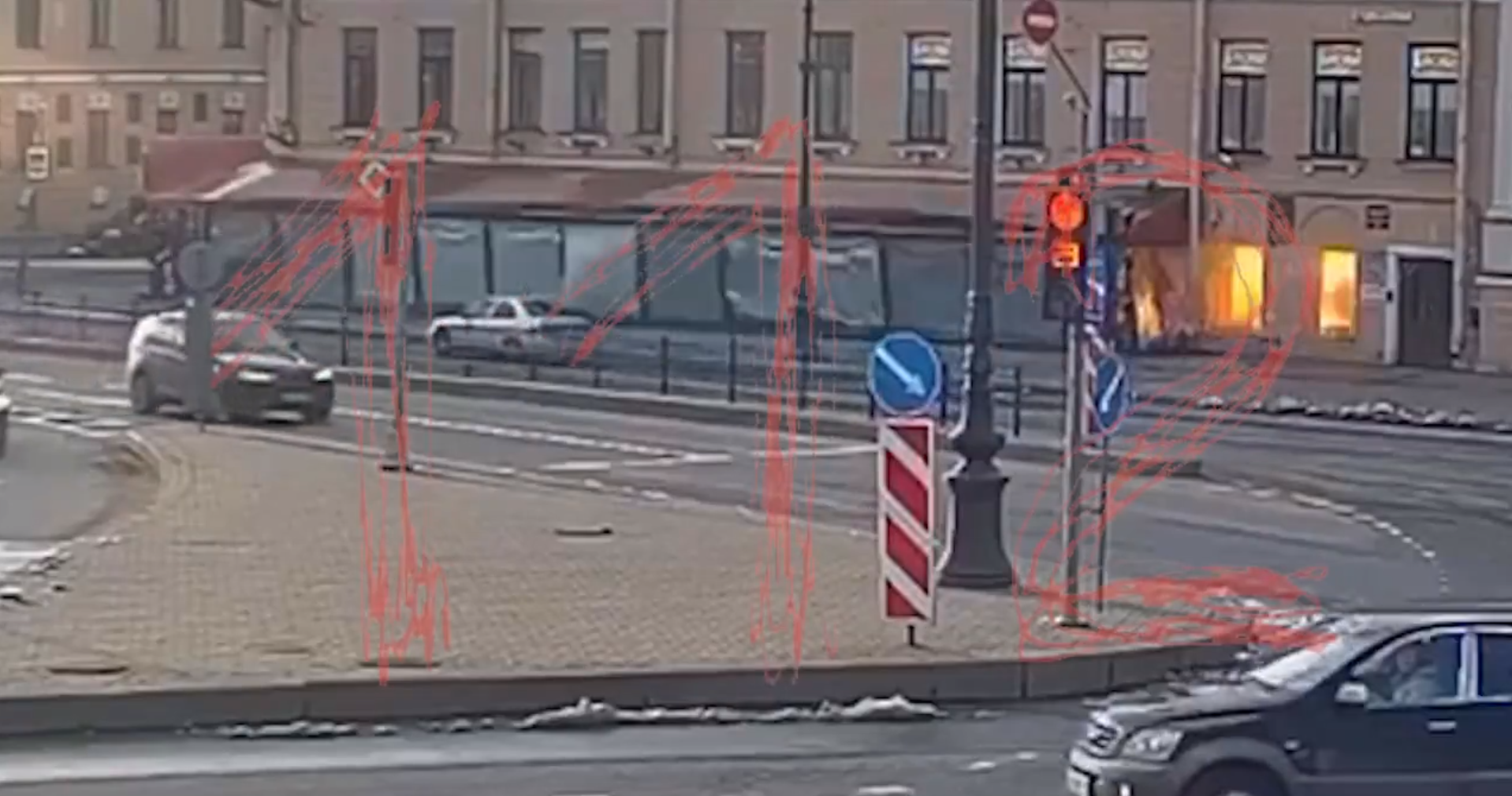
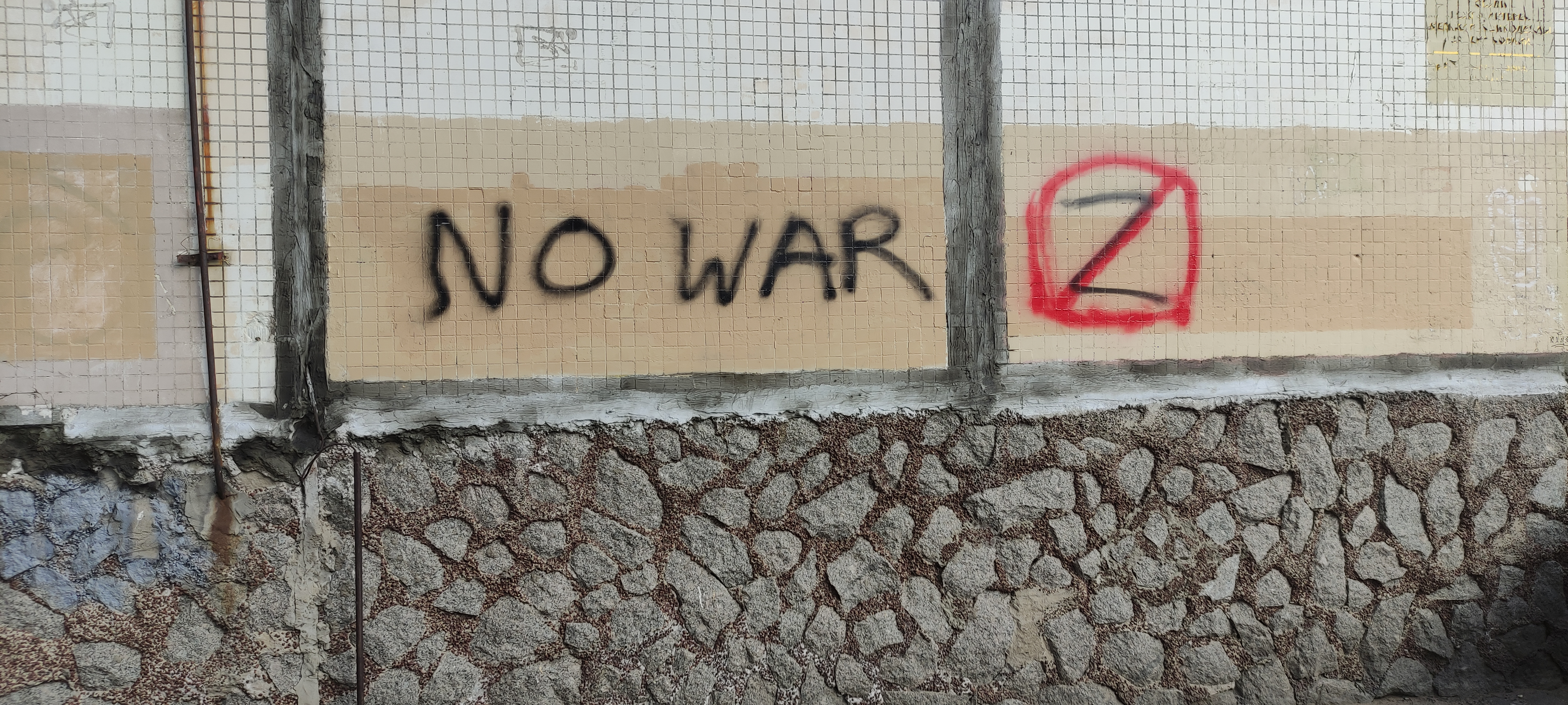
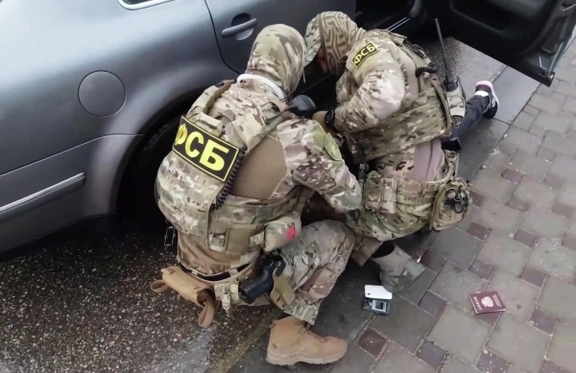
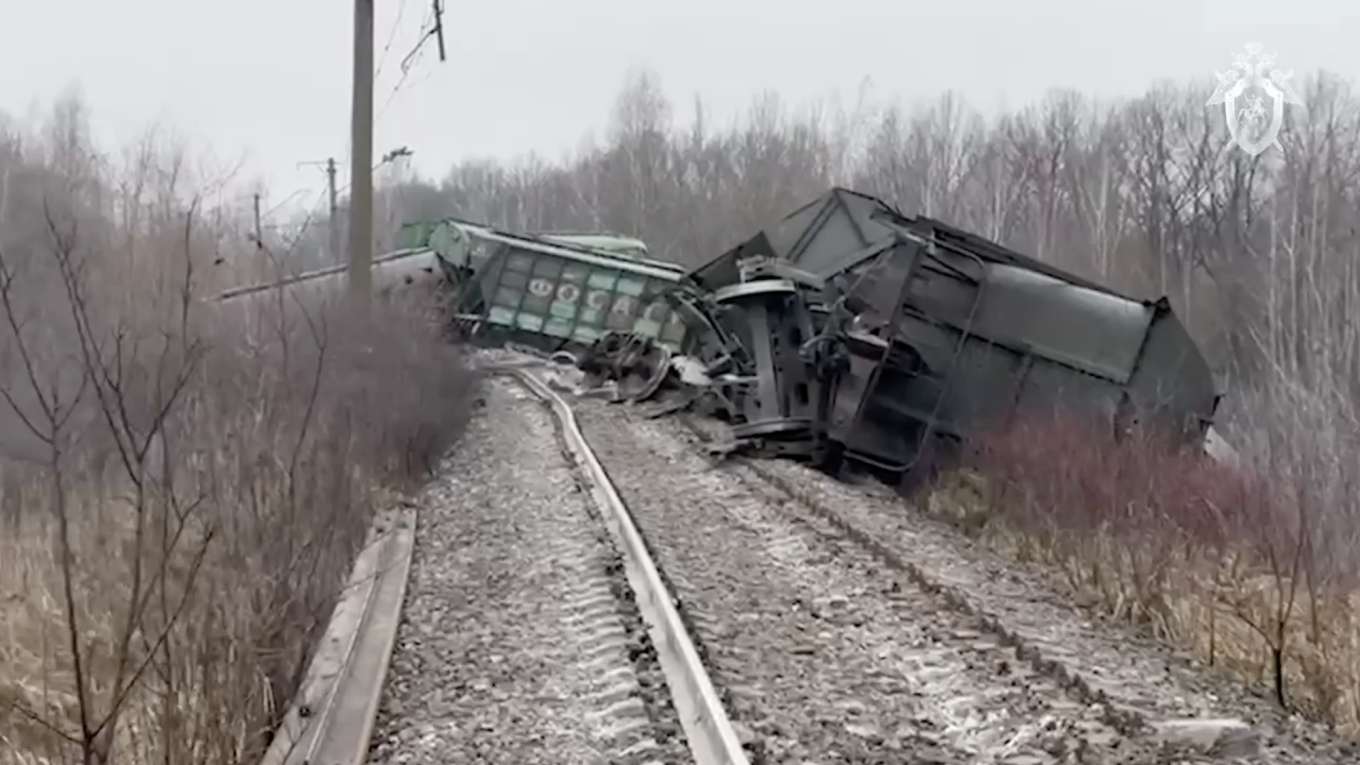
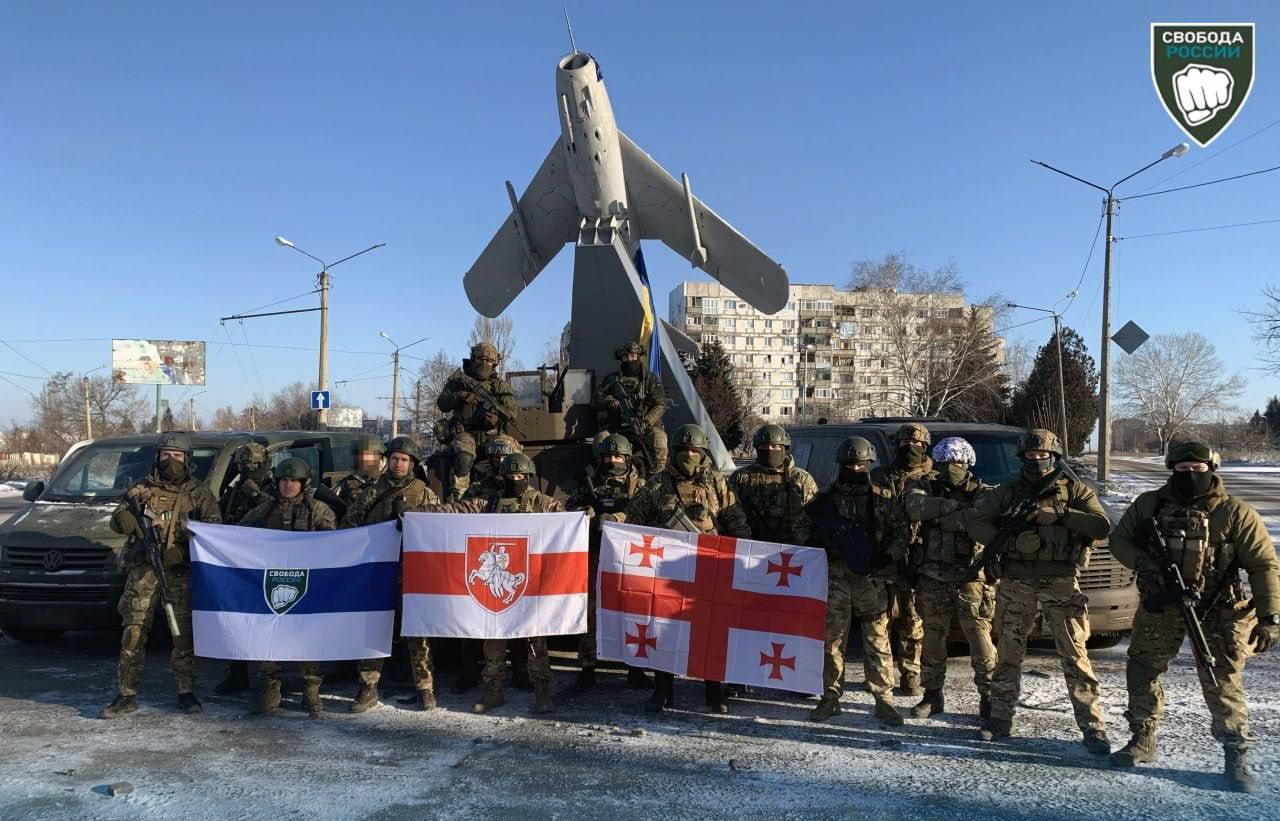
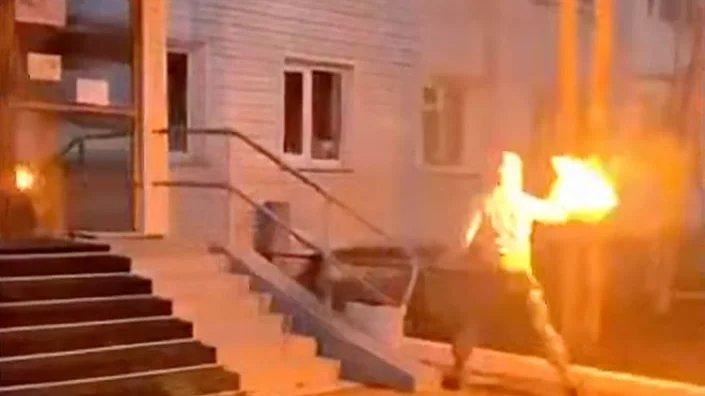
- Clockwise from top left: Assassination of Vladlen Tatarsky; Anti-war graffiti in Saint Petersburg, 2022; Derailed train in Russia, 2023; Nizhnevartovsk military commisariat attack, 2023; Freedom of Russia Legion, Kastuś Kalinoŭski Regiment and Georgian Legion soldiers, 2022; FSB detains a pro-Ukrainian partisan, 2024
Date	24 February 2022 – present (4 years, 8 months, 3 weeks and 4 days)
Location	Russia
Status	Ongoing

Belligerents
Russian opposition; Separatists; Islamic State; Foreign partisians; (Ukraine) Ukrainian partisans; (Belarus) Belarusian partisans; (Romania) Romanian militants	Russian government

Commanders and leaders
Dmitry Petrov †; Maximilian Andronnikov; Denis Kapustin; Andrey Pronsky; Vyacheslav Maltsev other leaders and decentralized figures	Vladimir Putin; Mikhail Mishustin; Sergei Shoigu; Valery Gerasimov

Units involved
Russian opposition; BOAK; Black Spark; Stop the Wagons; Black Bridge; (Russia) National Republican Army; FRL; Armed Wing; Resistance of the Legion; Russian Volunteer Corps; NS/WP; Artpodgotovka; Lone wolf militants; Rebellious army conscripts; Separatists; North Caucasus partisans; (Circassia) Circassian nationalists; Ingush Independence Committee; ILA; Chechen militant groups; OBON; IADAT; Committee of Bashkir Resistance; Sibir Battalion; Karelian National Movement; Nord; Kuban Partisan Movement; Islamic State; Islamic State – Caucasus Province; Islamic State – Khorasan Province (from 2024); Foreign partisians; Ukrainian partisans; Silent Crow; Atesh; Cyber Partisans; Popular Resistance of Ukraine; Resistance Committee; (Belarus) Belarusian partisans; Cyber Partisans; (Romania) Romanian militants	Russian government; Ministry of Defense; Russian Armed Forces; Ministry of Internal Affairs; Police; Security Council; National Guard; National Guard Forces Command; OMON; SOBR; Federal Security Service; Investigative Committee; Roskomnadzor; Russian Railways; Crimean SMERSh

Casualties and losses
At least 32 killed (Note: 28 partisans killed, 2 FRL and 1 RVC members confirmed killed during 2023 Belgorod Oblast incursions, 1 LPR member confirmed killed during March 2024 western Russia incursion); At least 160 arrested; 152 convicted	At least 16 servicemen killed (Note: 14 confirmed killed during 2023 Belgorod Oblast incursions, 1 assassinated in July 2023, 1 territorial defence member confirmed killed during March 2024 western Russia incursion); 1 ex-rebel assassinated; Vladlen Tatarsky and Darya Dugina (Note: Disputed) assassinated; 1 Mil Mi-8 helicopter destroyed; 31 civilians killed, 150 injured (per Russia) (Note: 2 killed and 2 injured during 2023 Bryansk Oblast raid, 13 killed and 50 injured during 2023 Belgorod Oblast incursions, 16 killed and 98 injured during March 2024 western Russia incursion)

An underground Russian partisan movement against the Federal Government of Russia has started appearing since the beginning of the Russian invasion of Ukraine (which Ukraine officially calls "Large-Scale Armed Aggression" and what Russia calls a "Special Military Operation" (SMO)). Both belligerents have avoided declaring war on each other, and prefer to use the above-mentioned designations to refer to the conflict. Anti-Russian and pro-Ukrainian partisan movements have emerged following the escalation of the Russo-Ukrainian war.

These armed movements act against the Russian Federation, as well as against the civilian populations of Russia, its authorities, and the Russian Armed Forces, with the aim of stopping the war.

== Attacks on property of authorities and supporters of the war ==
By 2022-03-07, cases of arsons of police departments were recorded in Smolensk and Krasnoyarsk.

As of 5 July 2022, at least 23 attacks on military enlistment offices were recorded, 20 of which were arson. The arson attacks were not a single coordinated campaign: behind them were a variety of people: from far-left to far-right groups. Sometimes they were lone actors who did not associate themselves with any movements. Civilian vehicles bearing the letter Z insignia (supporting the war efforts) were also set ablaze.

On 2022-08-27, multiple Russian-language outlets reported that a woman named Evgenia Belova doused a parked BMW X6 with accelerant and set it ablaze in Moscow. The vehicle belonged to Yevgeny Sekretarev (Russian: Евгения Секретарева) who reportedly works for the Eighth Directorate of the General Staff of the Armed Forces of the Russian Federation; the Directorate oversees the State Secret Protection Service handling wartime censorship. A woman detained for the arson also reportedly proclaimed her opposition to the war. The woman is described as 65 years old, a patient of a local "psychoneurological clinic", and lives in the same building as Sekretarev. Coverage of the incident by Radio Svoboda, mentioned a relative of the woman making the unverified claim that she was "kidnapped prior to the arson by Ukrainian special forces", held for a "ransom of 500,000 Russian rubles", and "hypnotized". The woman's relatives further insisted she "was never against the Russian authorities", and "would never have committed arson against the Russian government".

== Rail war ==
In Russia, the movements Combat Organization of Anarcho-Communists (BOAK) and Stop the Wagons announced their sabotage activities on the railway infrastructure. According to The Insider, 63 freight trains derailed in Russia between March and June 2022, about one and a half times as much as during the same period the previous year.

At the same time, the geography of wagon wrecks shifted to the west, and some trains got into accidents near military units. According to Russian Railways and inspection bodies, half of the accidents are related to the poor condition of the railway tracks.

=== Attributed to BOAK ===
Representatives of BOAK took responsibility not only for dismantling rails and railway sabotage in Sergiyev Posad near Moscow and near Kirzhach, Vladimir Oblast, but also for setting fire to cell towers (for example, in the village of Belomestnoye in the Belgorod Oblast) and even for setting fire to cars of people supporting actions of the Russian leadership.

According to the anarchists themselves, their activities were largely inspired by the actions of the Belarusian partisans, who effectively resisted the Russian invasion through the territory of Belarus at the very beginning of the war.

=== Attributed to Stop the Wagons ===
The "Stop the Wagons" movement in Russia claimed responsibility for the derailment of wagons in the Amur Oblast.

Due to which traffic on the Trans-Siberian Railway was stopped on 29 June, for the derailment of a train in Tver on 5 July, several wagons with coal in Krasnoyarsk on 13 July, as well as freight trains in the Krasnoyarsk Krai at the Lesosibirsk station on 19 July, in Makhachkala overnight between 23 and 24 July (the investigating authorities of Dagestan also considered sabotage as a probable cause of this incident) and on the Oktyabrskaya railway near Babaevo station on 12 August. According to the map published by the movement, its activists operate on more than 30% of the territory of Russia.

== Assassinations ==
=== Assassination of Darya Dugina ===
On 20 August 2022, ultranationalist journalist, political scientist and activist Darya Dugina was killed by a car bombing in Bolshiye Vyazyomy, Odintsovsky District, Moscow Oblast. It is widely presumed the bomb was also meant to kill her father, Aleksandr Dugin. Both are identified with National Bolshevism, gave statements justifying war against Ukraine, and denied war crimes such as Bucha massacre. The United States sanctioned both figures for their support of the regime and the war; Dugina was also sanctioned for her work with Yevgeny Prigozhin in the Russian interference in the 2016 United States elections.

Former State Duma deputy Ilya Ponomarev, who is based in Kyiv, said that a partisan organization called the "National Republican Army" (NRA) operating inside Russia and engaged in "overthrowing the Putin regime" was behind the assassination of Dugina; Ponomarev also called the event a "momentous event" and said that the partisans inside Russia were "ready for further similar attacks". Ponomarev told several outlets that he had been "in touch" with representatives of the organization since April 2022, while also claiming that the group had been involved in "unspecified partisan activities".

However, the veracity of Ponomarev's claims not withstanding and his endorsement of armed action against the regime resulted in his blacklisting by the Russian Action Committee (RAC), an anti-Putin exile group. According to the committee's statement, this was because he "called for terrorist attacks on Russian territory," The committee's statement also implied that Dugina was a "civilian" who "did not take part in the armed confrontation", and condemned denunciations of Aleksandr Dugin following the attack as "a demonstrative rejection of normal human empathy for the families of the victims".

=== Assassination of Vladlen Tatarsky ===
On 2 April 2023, a bombing occurred in the Street Food Bar No.1 café on Universitetskaya Embankment in Saint Petersburg, Russia, during an event hosted by Russian military blogger Vladlen Tatarsky (real name Maxim Fomin), who died as a result of the explosion. 42 people were also injured, 24 of whom were hospitalized, including six in critical condition. The bomb was allegedly hidden inside a statuette and handed to him as a gift by an "unidentified woman".

Russia accused Ukraine of being behind the attack and labelled it a "terrorist act", while Ukraine blamed the attack on "domestic terrorism". The National Republican Army (NRA) also claimed responsibility for the attack. Darya Trepova, a Russian citizen, was later convicted to 27 years in prison for the attack in 2024.

=== Other assassinations ===
On 6 May 2023, in Pionerskoye village, Bor District, Nizhny Novgorod Oblast, an anti-tank mine exploded under an Audi Q7 car, in which the ultranationalist writer and politician Zakhar Prilepin was driving. Prilepin received severe leg injuries, and his bodyguard died on the spot. Responsibility for the attack was claimed by Atesh, a militant group of Ukrainians and Crimean Tatars.

On 11 July 2023, Navy Captain Stanislav Rzhitsky, deputy head of military mobilization efforts in Krasnodar, was shot and killed while jogging. As commander of the submarine Krasnodar based in the Black Sea, he was accused of launching missiles that struck Vinnytsia in July 2022 and killed 23 civilians, although his father claimed he had left active service prior to the invasion in 2021.

On 12 November 2026, a colonel serving in the Russian Aerospace Forces was killed by car bomb in Saint Petersburg. Investigators identified a 31-year-old suspect who allegedly surveilled the officer for a month before planting the device and fleeing through Turkey to Moldova. The explosives had allegedly been smuggled into Russia from the Baltic states by balloon. The victim's identity has not been officially confirmed.

== Ground incursions ==
=== Bryansk Oblast incursions ===
On 2 March 2023, the Russian authorities said that an armed Ukrainian group crossed the border and attacked the villages of Lyubechane and Sushany in Bryansk Oblast. Russia said the attackers fired on a car, killing two civilians, before the Federal Security Service forced them back into Ukraine. The raid was claimed by the Russian Volunteer Corps; a paramilitary group of Russian citizens, based in Ukraine, which opposes the Russian regime of Vladimir Putin. (Note: In the immediate aftermath, Ukrainian officials have said that the group is independent.) Russia called the incident a terrorist attack, and said its 9 March missile strikes on Ukraine were retaliation. Ukraine's government denied involvement; it said the incident could have been a false-flag attack by Russia to justify its ongoing war against Ukraine, or else an attack by anti-government partisans from within Russia.

=== Belgorod and Kursk Oblasts incursions ===
==== May–June 2023 ====
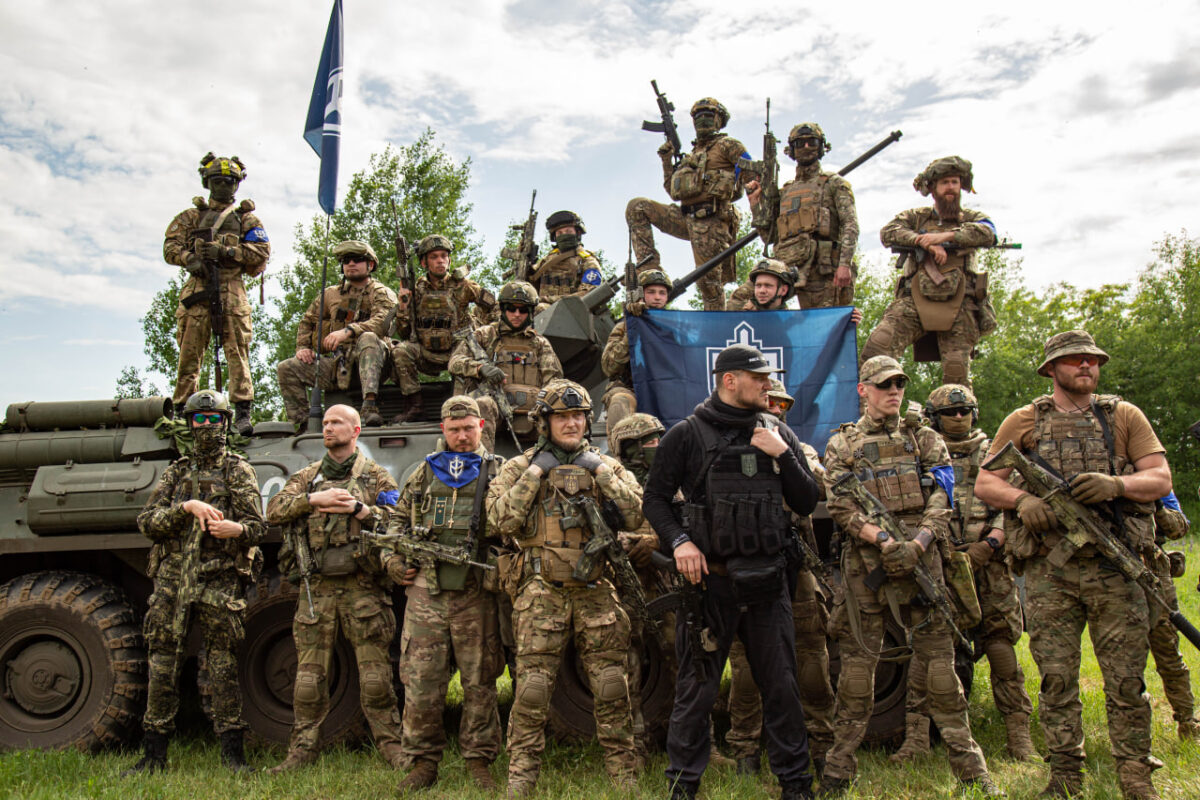
Russian Volunteer Corps (RVC) members on 24 May 2023

On 22 May, another cross-border raid took place, this time in the Belgorod Oblast; in the Kozinka, Gora-Podol and Grayvoron districts. The Freedom of Russia Legion (FRL) and Russian Volunteer Corps (RVC), as well as allied Polish, Belarusian and Chechen militant groups, claimed responsibility for the attacks. A Ukrainian spokesperson, Andrii Yusov, made the same claim, stating that the attacks were to "liberate" the regions and to provide a buffer zone to protect Ukrainian civilians. Russian authorities attributed the attacks to "a Ukrainian sabotage-reconnaissance group", and imposed a "counter-terrorist operation regime" in the region to combat the incursion. The anti-government forces, however, left Russian territory on May 24, with the exception of a few soldiers who would stage a short incursion into Glotovo on May 25.

On 1 June, the FRL and RVC, alongside their allied groups, launched another raid into Belgorod Oblast, this time near the small towns of Shebekino and Novaya Tavolzhanka, with Belgorod City itself being the target of UAV and missile attacks. Most troops left however on June 17, after Russian forces retook control of Novaya Tavolzhanka two days prior, with sporadic incursions and shellings soon ensuing through the rest of June and July.

On 19 June, Russian sources claimed that 7 civilians were wounded due to anti-government shelling in Belgorod. And on 22 June, the Russian ministry of Defense claimed to have used thermobaric weapons against remaining partisans in the Oblast. During the Wagner Group rebellion on 24 June, it was noted by the Atlantic Council that some anti-government partisans were still operating in Belgorod, organizing ambushes on Russian troops and sabotage of important military infrastructure.

==== July–December 2023 ====
In mid-July, the Ukrainian Main Directorate of Intelligence published a video showing Chechen volunteers of the Separate Special Purpose Battalion ambushing a Russian military truck at Sereda, Belgorod, killing two Russian soldiers.

On 28 September, the Freedom of Russia Legion claimed that it had begun another raid into Belgorod Oblast. The Russian Astra Telegram channel also stated that Russian troops were battling pro-Ukrainian forces at the border.

On 17 December 2023, the FRL and RVC partisans launched yet another raid into Belgorod. According to a Russian official and other Russian as well as Ukrainian sources, the insurgents targeted the Morozovsk airbase with "mass drone strikes", while clashing with security forces at the village of Terebreno. The Ukrainian Ministry of Defence subsequently claimed that a Russian "platoon stronghold" at Terebreno had been destroyed by the rebels. The Freedom of Russia Legion claimed responsibility for the raid, and stated that it had withdrawn from Russian territory after mining the eliminated "stronghold" at Terebreno.

==== March–April 2024 ====
On 12 March 2024, the FRL and RVC, alongside allied Chechen and Romanian militant battalions launched raids into the Kursk and Belgorod Oblasts, claiming control of Tyotkino and Lozovaya Rudka. The raids continued until April 7, with anti-government forces claiming control of several villages in the meantime such as Gorkovsky and Kozinka, most forces however later left the region back into Ukraine.

==== November 2023 – June 2025 ====
As early as 2025, several reports of Ukrainian attacks against Russia started to mention the support of a partisan organization named Black Spark. Fronted by former Gazprombank vice-president Igor Volubuev, the group claims to be a middle class resistance against the Putin government, alledgedly with insiders in the government.

In October 2025, the movement was mentioned during an operation that destroyed a Buk-M3, followed by the attack on aN 9K720 Iskander launch site in November and two russian vessels in the Republic of Kalmikia in December 2025.

The group was also mentioned in Ukrainian attacks against Russian oil infrastructure. Among those are strikes against the Ilsky Oil Refinery in Krasnodar in September 2025, a drone strike in Leningrad Oblast in May 2026, and an oil pumping station in Yaroslavl in June 2026. All of those actions were in support of Ukrainian Special Operations Forces

== Involved groups ==
=== National Republican Army (NRA) ===
==== Purported manifesto ====
Ponomarev read the NRA's purported manifesto on a YouTube channel he owns, February Morning (Russian: Утро Февраля). The text of the manifesto was also shared over February Morning's affiliated Telegram channel, Rospartizan (Russian: Роспартизан). As of 26 August 2022, YouTube's metrics indicate video containing the claim of responsibility and sharing the manifesto is February Morning's most-seen video with 176,646 views.

In a May 2022 conference of exiles in Vilnius sponsored by the Free Russia Forum (FRP), Ponomarev appealed to attendees to support direct action within Russia. A Spektr (Russian: Спектр) reporter noted an indifferent response from the attendees.

==== Doubts of NRA's existence ====
Doubts of the NRA's responsibility and its very existence have been raised by a wide variety of commentators. A 22 August 2022 report from Reuters says that "[Ponomarev's] assertion and the group's existence could not be independently verified".

As for the assassination of Dugina, the sole suspect named by Russian investigators is a Ukrainian woman whom, Russia claims, is part of its military. The Russian government has also stated that the woman fled to Estonia following the assassination. The governments of Ukraine and Estonia each denied any role in the assassination of Darya Dugina.

== Reaction of the authorities ==
The Russian authorities were forced to tighten security measures on the railways following the derailing of trains by resistance movements.

On 8 May 2022, the Telegram channel of the Stop the Wagons movement was blocked. According to their own statements, they were blocked "after the publication of a map of railway resistance, which covered over 30% of the territory of Russia". On 19 July, the website of Stop the Wagons was also blocked by Roskomnadzor in Russia at the request of the Prosecutor General's Office.

In August 2022, a court in Moscow fined the Telegram messenger 7 million Russian rubles (quoted by TASS as equivalent to US$113,900) for refusing to remove channels providing instructions for railway sabotage and containing "propaganda pushing the ideology of anarchism".

== See also ==
- Popular Resistance of Ukraine
- Suspicious Russia-related deaths since 2022
- Ukrainian resistance in Russian-occupied Ukraine
- Primorsky Partisans

=== Other national opposition movements ===
- Iraqi opposition (pre-2003)
- Libyan opposition
- Syrian opposition (2011–2024)
- Iranian opposition
- Belarusian opposition
