= Oleh Dunda =

Ukrainian politician

- Олег Дунда
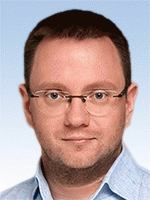
- Official portrait, 2019

People's Deputy of Ukraine
- Incumbent
- Assumed office 29 August 2019
- Preceded by: Ruslan Solvar
- Constituency: Kyiv Oblast, Ukraine's 91st electoral district

Personal details
- Born: 6 June 1980 (age 45) Dnipropetrovsk, Ukrainian SSR, Soviet Union (now Dnipro, Ukraine)
- Party: Servant of the People
- Other political affiliations: Independent; Revival

Oleh Andriiovych Dunda (Ukrainian: Олег Андрійович Дунда; born 6 March 1980) is a Ukrainian entrepreneur and member of the Verkhovna Rada of Ukraine of the 9th convocation. He serves as co-chair of the inter-factional parliamentary association For the Decolonization of Russia and is a member of the Committee on the Organization of State Power, Local Self-Government, Regional Development, and Urban Planning of the Verkhovna Rada of Ukraine, where he chairs the subcommittee on construction and design.

== Biography ==
Born on 6 March 1980, in Dnipro, Ukraine.

In 1999, he graduated from the Dnipropetrovsk Technical School of Welding and Electronics (programmer-systems engineer). His diploma thesis (practical) was the development of software for the reliability calculation of electronic devices.

In 2001, he graduated from the State Institute for Advanced Training and Retraining of Management and Specialists of the Metallurgical Complex (Dnipro) with a degree in Finance. His diploma thesis was the development of financial instruments for managing non-performing loans of a commercial bank.

A candidate for people's deputies from the Servant of the People party in the parliamentary elections in 2019 (electoral district No. 91, Fastiv city, Makariv, Fastiv districts, part of Kyiv-Sviatoshynskyi, part of Skvyrskyi districts).

At the time of the elections, he was the director of LLC "A. V. S.", and independent. He resides in Kyiv.

== Legislative Activities ==
Dunda is the author of bills: On Amendments to Certain Laws of Ukraine on the Legal Support of the Presence of Foreign Citizenship (Nationality) in Citizens of Ukraine, and On the State Information Concern Television and Radio Broadcasting.

He is the author of legislative initiatives regarding the need to establish responsibility for the propaganda of the Russian world ideology and its promotion in Ukraine.

He initiated an appeal to the Chairman of the Verkhovna Rada of Ukraine to include in the agenda a draft resolution on the deprivation of mandates of parliamentary deputies from the Opposition Platform — For Life No. 7694 and draft law No. 7476 on the deprivation of mandates of deputies of local councils from prohibited pro-Russian parties (Opposition Platform — For Life, Party of Shariy, Nashi, and others).

He is a co-author of the bill to prohibit members of banned pro-Russian parties from running for parliament and councils at all levels.

He is the author of a draft resolution on the basic principles of negotiations on the surrender of Russia or its successors and the conditions for ending the war.

== Public Activities ==
He participates in events organized by the Atlantic Council and the Jamestown Foundation. Oleh Dunda specializes in global security, international sanctions, and military-industrial complex. He actively advocates for the need to dismantle the Russian Federation as the last colonial empire and supports Ukrainian refugees in Europe.

He is the author of publications in Ukrainian and foreign media outlets, including The Hill, New Eastern Europe, Kyiv Post, Libertatea, Atlantic Council, The Gaze, Ukrainska Pravda, Glavcom, 24 Kanal, and Dzerkalo Tyzhnia.

Dunda is involved in developing a program for the restoration of Ukraine after the war and supports local communities in their reconstruction efforts and direct cooperation with Western investors.
