= Red Cross service =

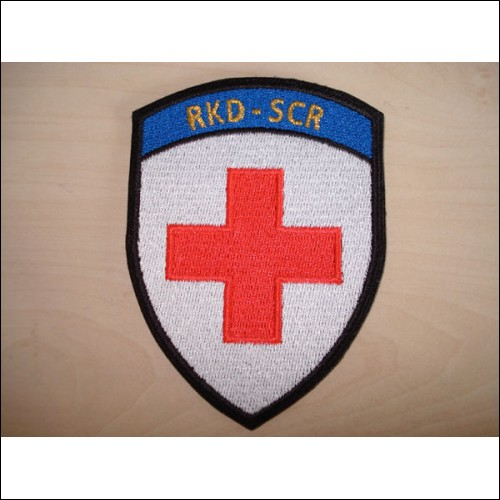
Badge of The Red Cross service in the Swiss Armed Forces

The Red Cross service (German: Rotkreuzdienst, RKD) is since 1903 a department of the Swiss Red Cross. It consists of approximately 300 women with qualified medical training in voluntary military service in support of the medical service in the Swiss Armed Forces, founded by Henry Dunant Red Cross traditions.

The members of the RKD (AdRKD) are divided into units, bodies of troops and staffs of the Swiss Armed Forces. They are trained by the army, equipped, used and remunerated. With few exceptions, they have the same rights and duties as the male members of the Army Medical Service. In particular, they enjoy the protection of the Geneva Conventions.

AdRKD provide refresher courses with the troops, they are under the Coordinated Medical (KSD), but may also occur in extraordinary circumstances (severe epidemics or major disaster). They wear the uniform and insignia of the Army and related income replacement. The military grade are accompanied by the words "RKD", for example "Wm RKD" for sergeant.

The management of the service holds since February 2006 Colonel RKD Brigitte Rindlisbacher.

== Qualification ==
The Red Cross service accepts Swiss citizens who are between 18 and 38 years old. This requires a professional training in healthcare or in the areas of international law, education or adult education (for teaching of International humanitarian law and Red Cross principles).

== History ==
The mass internment of foreign military personnel in Switzerland, showed in the German-French war, that the civilian Swiss Red Cross (SRC) and the Swiss Army are mutually dependent. Therefore, were private nursing training in 1903, which were under the patronage of the SRC, subsidized founds from the federal treasury. In return, the SRC had to support the army medical service if needed at a mobilization of two thirds of its medical personnel.

Initially, only nurses were assigned to the Red Cross service. Later, women of pharmacy, medicine and alternative medicine are encouraged to join the Red Cross service. From the 2nd World War, Girl Scouts, office professional women, teachers, lawyers, etc. have been used in military hospitals, where they performed support services for the benefit of Hospital Administration.

== Sources ==
- The Swiss Red Cross: Diversity in Unity
- German only, Regulation about Rotkreuzdienst (VRKD)

== Literature ==
- 100 Jahre Rotkreuzdienst in der Schweizer Armee – Frauen setzen Henry Dunants Idee um. Verlag Huber Frauenfeld 2003

(100 years service in the Red Cross Swiss Army - women put Henry Dunant's idea to reality).
