= Gorkovskoye, Omsk Oblast =

Gorkovskoye Горьковское
- Urban-type settlement
- Interactive map of Gorkovskoye
- Location of Gorkovskoye Gorkovskoye (Omsk Oblast)
- Coordinates: 55°22′N 74°22′E
- Country: Russia
- Federal subject: Omsk Oblast
- Administrative district: Gorkovsky District
- Founded: 1776
- Elevation: 111 m (364 ft)

Population (2010 Census)
  - Total: 5,369
  - Estimate (2025): 4,745 (−11.6%)
- Time zone: UTC+6 (MSK+3)
- Postal code: 646600
- OKTMO ID: 52609151051

Gorkovskoye (Russian: Горьковское) is an urban locality (a work settlement) and the administrative center of Gorkovsky District of Omsk Oblast, Russia, located 75 kilometers (47 mi) northeast of Omsk. Population: 5,369 (2010 census); 5,713 (2002 census); 6,020 (1989 Soviet census).
