= Freedom of Russia Legion =

Ukrainian military unit formed of Russian defectors

- Легион «Свобода России» (Russian); Легіон «Свобода Росії» (Ukrainian)
- Unit patch
- Founded: 10 March 2022; 4 years ago
- Country: Ukraine
- Allegiance: Irpin Declaration
- Branch: International Legion of the Defence Intelligence of Ukraine
- Type: Foreign volunteer legion
- Size: Two battalions (as claimed by the Legion)
- Mottos: "For Russia! For freedom!" (Russian: За Россию! За свободу!) and "Russia will be free!" (Russian: Россия будет свободной!)
- Colors: White-blue-white
- March: "Patrioticheskaya Pesnya"
- Engagements: Russo-Ukrainian War; Russian invasion of Ukraine; 2022–2023 Western Russia attacks; 2023 Belgorod Oblast attack; March 2024 Western Russia incursion
- Website: https://legionliberty.army/

Commanders
- Current commander: Unknown; Maximilian Andronnikov (speaker)
- Spokesperson: Kostiantyn Denysov

Insignia
- Flags
- Song: "Rise Up" (Russian: «Поднимись», lit. 'Arise')

The Freedom of Russia Legion (Note: also translated as the Liberty of Russia Legion, Freedom for Russia Legion or Legion of Freedom of Russia) (FRL, Russian: Легион «Свобода России», romanized: Legion "Svoboda Rossii"; Ukrainian: Легіон «Свобода Росії», romanized: Lehion "Svoboda Rosii"; abbr. ЛСР, romanized: LSR), also called the Free Russia Legion, is a Ukrainian-based paramilitary unit of Russian citizens, which opposes the Russian regime of Vladimir Putin and its invasion of Ukraine. It was formed in March 2022 and is reportedly part of Ukraine's International Legion. It consists of defectors from the Russian Armed Forces, and other Russian volunteers, some of whom had emigrated to Ukraine. It is one of several such units participating in the Russo-Ukrainian War on behalf of Ukraine.

Since 22 May 2023, the Legion has launched cross-border raids into the Belgorod region of Russia, alongside the Russian Volunteer Corps (RVC) and the Sibir Battalion.

== History ==
Former patch

Variant of the White-blue-white flag used by the Legion from 2022 to 2023

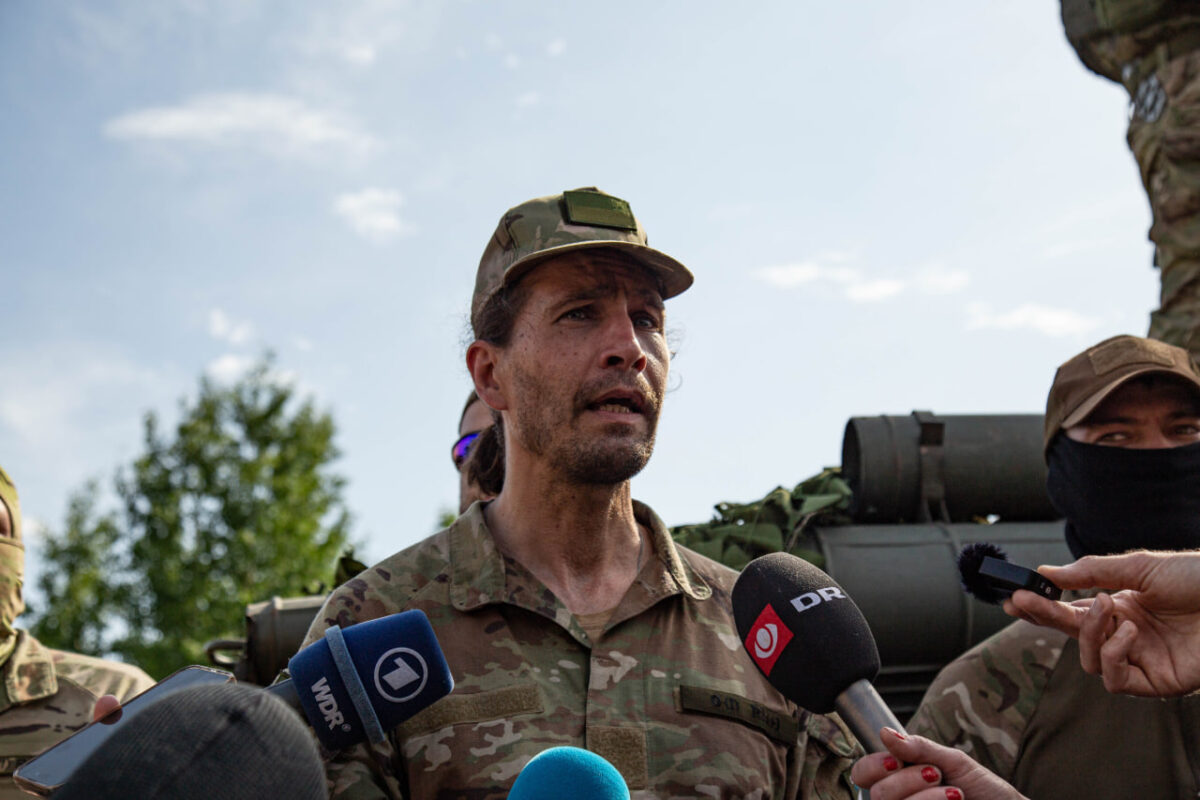
"Caesar", the spokesman and deputy commander of the Legion in an interview

According to UNIAN, the Freedom of Russia Legion was formed from a company of the Russian army who defected to the Ukrainian side. According to the company commander, they crossed to the Ukrainian side with the help of the Security Service of Ukraine on 27 February 2022, to "protect Ukrainians from real fascists". He called on his compatriots, soldiers of the Russian army, to join the Freedom of Russia Legion in order to save their own people and the country "from humiliation and destruction". The Legion's stated goals are to repel the Russian invasion of Ukraine and ultimately depose the silovik regime of Vladimir Putin. The group claims to comprise two battalions.

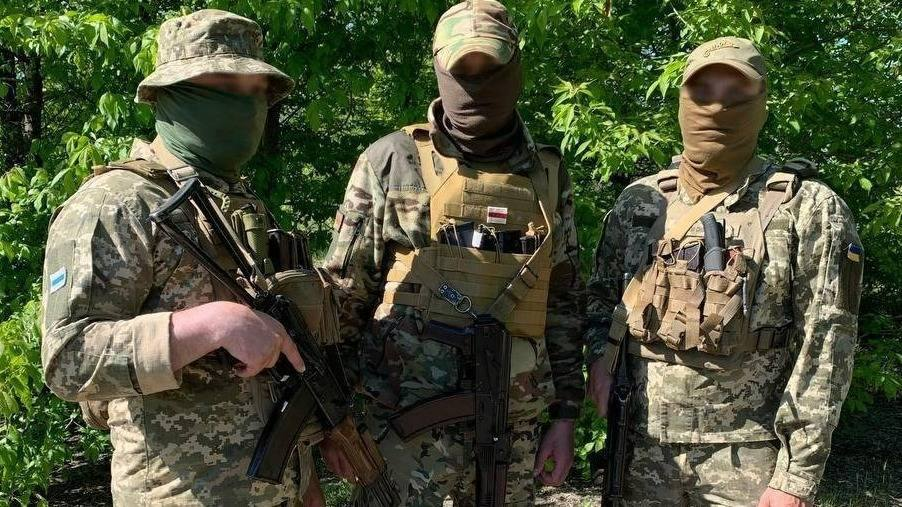
Soldiers of the Freedom of Russia Legion in May 2022

The Legion's official Telegram channel was created on 10 March 2022, and its first post called on people to join the armed struggle against the "war criminal Putin". On 5 April, three men wearing military fatigues and black balaclavas held a press conference in Kyiv, announcing that the Freedom of Russia Legion had been formed. They said it was made up wholly of Russian citizens, including former POWs. However, coercion of POWs into combat would violate the Article 23 of the Geneva Convention on Prisoners of War, which says that "no prisoner of war may at any time be sent to or detained in areas where he may be exposed to the fire of the combat zone." One of the men said the Putin regime had tricked them into going to Ukraine to carry out "genocide", saying he had seen war crimes by the Russian army.

The Freedom of Russia Legion is reportedly part of Ukraine's International Legion.

On 1 June 2022, the Legion's official Telegram (and YouTube) channel posted a video claiming to show a Russian tank being captured by the Legion. On 29 June, they said they captured a Russian POW in the Lysychansk area.

On 11 June, it became known that Igor Volobuyev, the Ukrainian-born ex-vice-chairman of Gazprombank, who left Russia at the outbreak of the invasion, had joined the Freedom of Russia Legion.

On 13 July, the Legion allegedly made a statement that it had withdrawn from active fighting, to "restore combat capability".

In December 2022, the Legion's spokesman said that it operated under Ukrainian command and were mainly involved in artillery and propaganda

Some Legion fighters reportedly fought in the battle of Bakhmut.

In May 2023, the Legion and the Russian Volunteer Corps launched a raid into Russia, in Grayvoronsky District, Belgorod Oblast. They claimed to aim at creating a demilitarised zone along the border, to stop Russian artillery firing at Ukraine from Russian territory. The two groups launched another raid on 1 June into the Shebekino area of Belgorod Oblast. A spokesman for the Legion said their goals were to draw Russian troops away from other parts of the front, and to encourage rebellion against the Russian government.

On 12 March 2024, the legion conducted raids in Kursk and Belgorod regions, and claimed to control two villages. When discussing the operation on 12 March, one volunteer for the legion claimed that they would eventually lead a "march on Moscow".

On 15 March 2024, the FSB reportedly arrested a man who had ties with the FRL. He confessed that he had assembled and launched drones on behalf of Ukraine. This was done by creating "false targets" in the vicinity of Russian Defense Ministry facilities.

On 21 August 2024, the FRL claimed that they had been contacted by a Russian FPV pilot, call sign "Silver", who wanted to cooperate with them. He reportedly "threw a grenade into the ventilation hole in the basement of the "Storm Zet" unit's headquarters, where his commander and other Russian officers were sleeping. In total, there were about 15 people in the basement". Afterwards, he fled across a pre–arranged route to Ukraine and joined the Legion. "Silver's" actions were part of Operation "Ocheret" (Ukrainian: Очерет, lit. 'Cane').

== Structure ==
Headquarters

- 1st Mechanized Battalion
- 1st Battalion
- 2nd Battalion
- 3rd Battalion
- 4th Battalion
- Artillery Unit
- Drone Company
- Reconnaissance Group "D.R.U.G"
- Hroza platoon

== Symbols and leadership ==
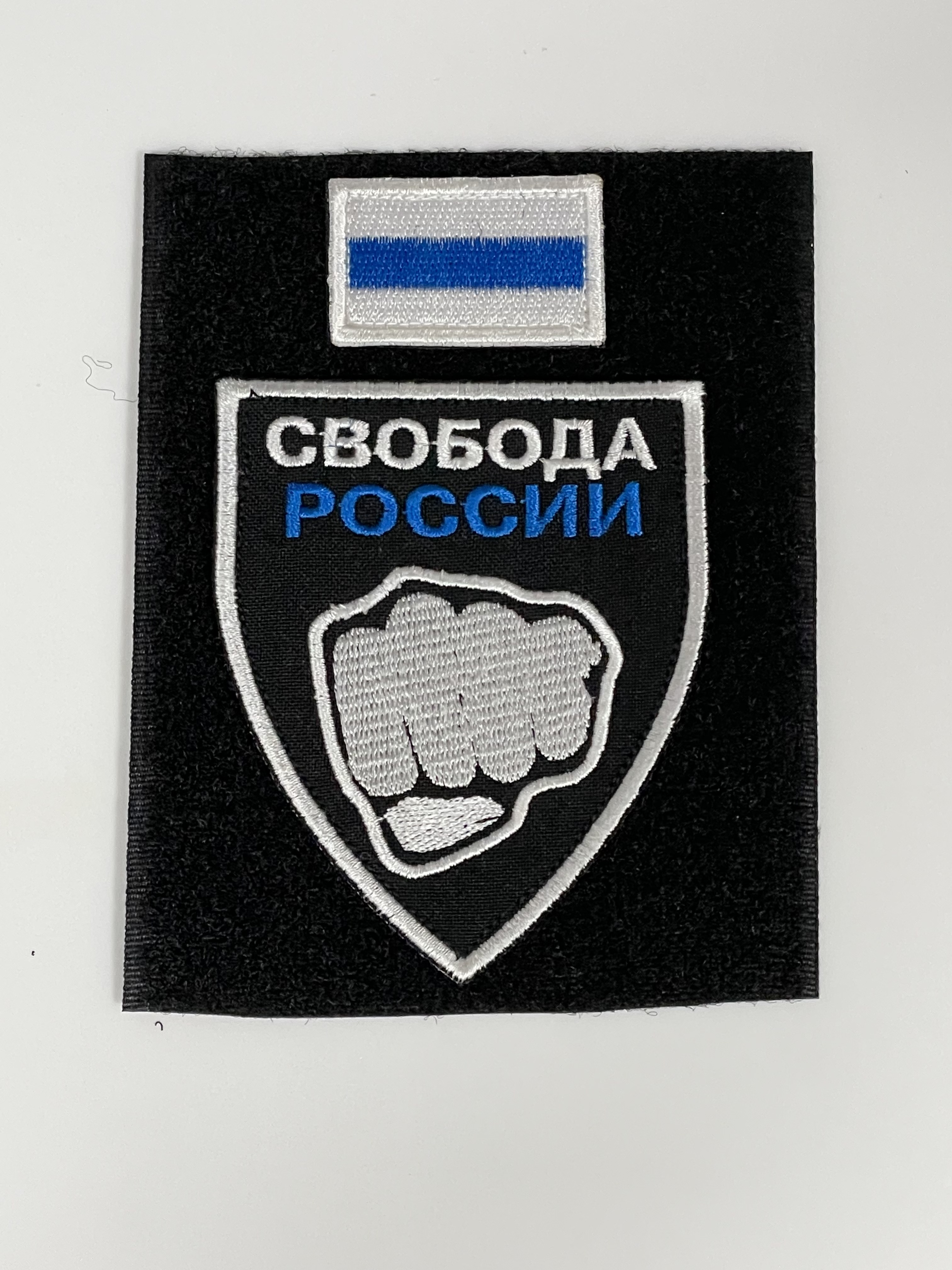
A patch set of the Freedom of Russia Legion with the clenched fist and the white-blue-white flag

The Legion uses the white-blue-white flag instead of the official white-blue-red flag of Russia. The letter L, the first letter of the words Legion and Liberty, is also used by the Legion as one of its symbols. On the right sleeve, the Legion wears the flag of Ukraine, like other Ukrainian foreign legions.

The Legion has not publicly identified its leaders. The Legion's spokesperson Maximilian Andronnikov, who uses "Caesar" (Tsezar) as a nom de guerre, has emerged as the group's de facto public face. He identifies himself as the Legion's deputy commander, and a former physiotherapist from Saint Petersburg. He said in December 2022: "I am not fighting my motherland. I am fighting against Putin's regime, against evil. I'm not a traitor. I'm a true Russian patriot who thinks about the future of my country."

== Ideology ==
The Legion's manifesto describes itself as a group of "free citizens of Russia who take responsibility for themselves and are beginning to fight for a New Russia." It criticizes Putin's government for its corruption and suppression of civil liberties. The group believes that Putin's regime can be toppled only by armed struggle, and calls upon Russian officers and soldiers to defect. Caesar, former member of the ultranationalist, and neo-Nazi Russian Imperial Movement, described himself as a right-wing nationalist, but said that "we adhere to moderate centrist views."

Michael Clarke, a visiting professor of war studies at King's College London, said in May 2023: "It's clear that Freedom of Russia Legion and Russian Volunteer Corps are both predominantly Russian groups — self-styled 'partisans' trying to bring the Putin government down and that they range from the soccer-thug neo-Nazis to the wannabe celebrities and even to some semi-serious political reformers. They are not 'liberals' but rather hard-line Russian nationalists — just not of the Putin variety."

David Axe, a staff writer for Forbes, described the group as "far-right".

== Relationship to other armed anti-Putin units in Russia ==
The far-right Russian Volunteer Corps (RVC), a separate anti-Putin group, has said it has "a different ideological base" than the Legion. Caesar declined to condemn the RVC, saying: "I do not discuss other units, especially Russian volunteers."

In August 2022, the Freedom of Russia Legion and National Republican Army signed the Irpin Declaration, a declaration of cooperation among armed anti-Putin Russian forces. The organizations also agreed to create a political wing, to represent their interests and organize a joint information policy, led by Ilya Ponomarev, a former Russian MP. However, the existence of the National Republican Army as an organization is unconfirmed, and representatives of the RVC attended the signing ceremony in Irpin. Ponomarev said that the RVC had signed the declaration, but the RVC denied that it had signed on.

== Estimated strength and training ==
The Legion's spokesperson Caesar said in December 2022 that the Legion had "several hundred" members. He said the unit's recruitment process involves multiple rounds of interviews, psychological testing, a polygraph test, and two months of training. He claimed in February 2023 that the legion consisted of two battalions and was raising two more.

== Reactions ==
The Russian government has responded to the Legion both legally and with propaganda. On 22 June 2022, Nikolay Okhlopkov, a Russian anti-war activist from Yakutsk, was arrested because the authorities accused him of "wanting to join the Legion." The Legion denied any link with Okhlopkov. On 14 July 2022, Putin signed a new law, under which Russian citizens can be imprisoned for up to 20 years if they "defect to the side of the enemy during an armed conflict or hostilities."

In March 2023 the Supreme Court of Russia declared the Legion a terrorist group meaning citizens who join can face up to 20 years in jail.

Russian state media has rarely mentioned "Freedom of Russia" during 2022. For example, as of July 2022, RT had only one video which mentioned the Legion.

=== Scepticism regarding the unit's existence ===
Both state-controlled and independent Russian media and analysts, such as the Conflict Intelligence Team, expressed doubts about the Legion's existence as a combat unit.

Illia Ponomarenko, defense and security reporter at The Kyiv Independent, commented to The Moscow Times: "There might be some [Russian] fighters, but whether it is organized in the way it is presented remains an open question ... It's clearer with the International Legion – there is a large number [of foreign soldiers] and they did take part in combat, for example, in Irpin, Sievierodonetsk and Lysychansk, but little is known about the [Freedom of Russia] legion." The Moscow Times also cited the report in Harper's Magazine which "described how Ukraine did not have the capacity to process and deploy foreign fighters who flocked to the country in the weeks after the invasion, and suggested foreign units were more PR than reality".

The Civil Council stated that the Russian Volunteer Corps is the only unit composed of Russian citizens in the Armed Forces of Ukraine, in contrast to the Freedom of Russia Legion, which "to this day is shrouded in a veil of mystery". Some volunteers who joined the Civil Council said that their attempts to contact the Legion's recruiters failed. Several Russian POWs who publicly joined the Legion were later exchanged, with some subsequently appearing in Russian media "exposing" Ukraine and making claims about torture in captivity.

== See also ==
- Russian Insurgent Army
- Dzhokhar Dudayev Battalion
- Sheikh Mansur Battalion
- Kastuś Kalinoŭski Regiment
- Tactical group "Belarus"
- Georgian Legion
- Civic Council (Armed Forces of Ukraine)
- Combat Organization of Anarcho-Communists
