= Gorkovsky, Belgorod Oblast =

Gorkovsky Горьковский
- Settlement
- Location within Belgorod Oblast Location within Russia
- Coordinates: 50°26′N 35°50′E
- Country: Russia
- Region: Belgorod Oblast
- District: Grayvoronsky District
- Time zone: UTC+3:00

Gorkovsky (Russian: Горьковский) is a rural locality (a settlement) and the administrative center of Gorkovskoye Rural Settlement, Grayvoronsky District, Belgorod Oblast, Russia. The population was 429 as of 2010. There are 4 streets.

On March 17, 2024, the village was captured by the Freedom of Russia Legion, Sibir Battalion and Chechen forces.

== Geography ==
Gorkovsky is located 24 km southeast of Grayvoron (the district's administrative centre) by road. Kazachok is the nearest rural locality.
