= Maximilian Andronnikov =

Russian militant (born 1974)

- Максимилиан Андронников
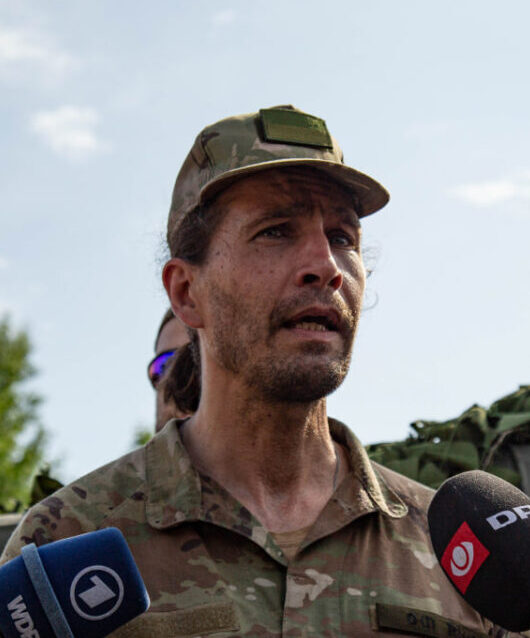
- Andronnikov in 2023
- Born: 19 March 1974 (age 52); Sochi, Russian SFSR, Soviet Union (now Russia)
- Military career
- Rank: Spokesperson of the Freedom of Russia Legion
- Nickname: Caesar (Цезарь)
- Commands: Freedom of Russia Legion
- Conflicts: Russo-Ukrainian War; Russian invasion of Ukraine; Belgorod Oblast Incursions; Western Russia Incursion

Maximilian Alexandrovich Andronnikov (Russian: Максимилиан Александрович Андронников; born 19 March 1974), known by his nom-de-guerre "Caesar" (Russian: Цезарь, romanized: Tsezar), is a Russian militant who is the commander and media spokesperson of the paramilitary group Freedom of Russia Legion. He is also a member of the Ilya Ponomarev-led Congress of People's Deputies.

== Biography ==
Andronnikov was born on 19 March 1974 in Sochi, Russian SFSR, Soviet Union. According to himself, he has a pedagogic education and worked as a coach in Saint Petersburg.

Andronnikov was previously a member of the ultranationalist Russian Imperial Movement (RIM), a group that is publicly opposed to Vladimir Putin but has also fielded pro-Russian fighters in the War in Donbas. A member of RIM who knows Andronnikov said he left the group before the Russo-Ukrainian War began in 2014. In 2020, RIM was designated a global terrorist group by the US State Department.

Andronnikov was also called a witness in a 2012 case about an alleged military coup plot planned by several people led by Vladimir Kvachkov in Yekaterinburg. Andronnikov, who then headed the Saint Petersburg “military-patriotic club,” was not charged in this case.

Andronnikov was working as an archery coach in February 2022 when the Russian full-scale invasion of Ukraine began and quickly left for Ukraine, fighting on the Ukrainian side ever since and saying earlier this year that his ultimate goal was to remove Putin from power. Before the 2023 raid, he said that he fought near the city of Bakhmut.

== Views ==
Caesar described himself as a right-wing nationalist, but said that "we adhere to moderate centrist views" in the Freedom of Russia Legion. He has also described himself as a "constitutional monarchist" who admires Sir Winston Churchill and Margaret Thatcher.

== See also ==
- Russian partisan movement (2022–present)
