= Yevgeny Domozhirov =

Russian politician (born 1974)

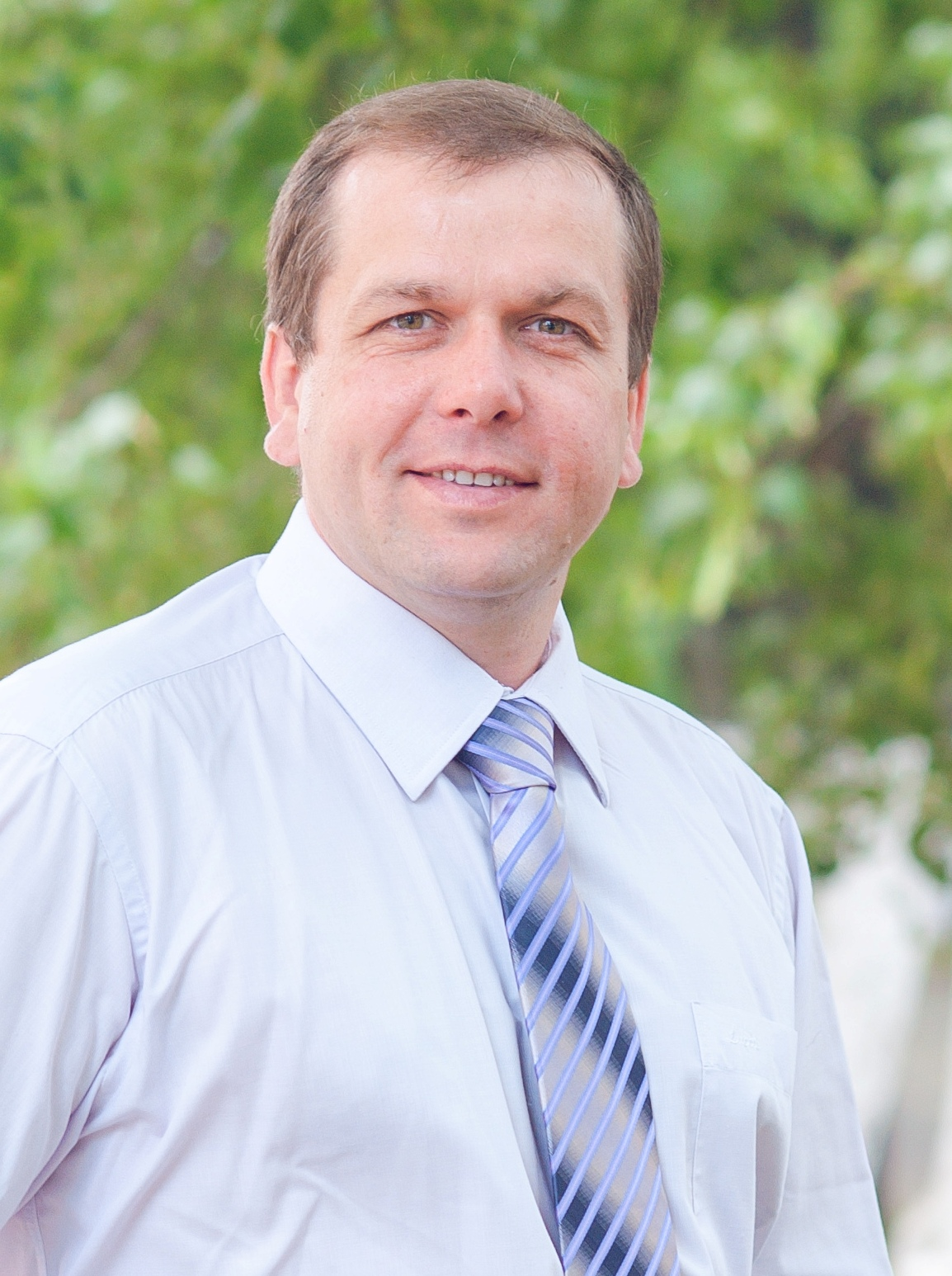
- Domozhirov in 2014

Member of Legislative Assembly of Vologda Oblast
- In office 4 December 2011 – 28 November 2012

Personal details
- Born: 28 July 1974 (age 52) Vologda, Russian SFSR, Soviet Union
- Party: A Just Russia — For Truth (2010–2012); Russia of the Future

Yevgeny Valeryevich Domozhirov (Russian: Евгений Валерьевич Доможиров; born 28 July 1974) is a Russian politician. He served as a deputy in the Legislative Assembly of Vologda Oblast from 2011 to 2012. He is also known as a former coordinator of Alexei Navalny's regional headquarters in Vologda in 2018 and member of the committee on local self-government issues of the Parliamentary Assembly of the Northwest of Russia. He was the chairman of the Council of the Vologda Regional Public Movement for Human Rights "Together: Freedom, Property, Responsibility". Domozhirov was a member of the A Just Russia — For Truth party until August 24, 2012. Since January 2015, he has been a member of the Central Council of the Russia of the Future party.

== Biography ==
Yevgeny Domozhirov was born in Vologda on July 28, 1974. He studied at School No. 30 and later at Vocational School No. 18, majoring in Cook-Confectioner. After his studies, he worked in the retail trade. He went on to study State and Municipal Administration at Vologda State Technical University and graduated in 2005.

Domozhirov entered politics in 2007 as an assistant to Mikhail Surov during the elections to the Legislative Assembly of the Vologda Oblast. In 2009, he became the head of the Vologda Regional Public Organization "Union for the Protection of Entrepreneurs." He was the Chairman of the Vologda Regional Public Movement for the Protection of Human Rights "Together: Freedom, Property, Responsibility" and a member of the "Fair Russia" party from 2010 to 2012.

In 2010, Domozhirov founded the "Together: Freedom, Property, Responsibility" movement to fight against corruption in municipal authorities in Vologda. That same year, he ran for the Vologda City Duma in electoral district No. 13 (Priluki (Vologda)), where he encountered opposition from the police. He took second place in the election, receiving 22.74% of the votes.

In December 2011, Domozhirov was elected as a deputy of the Legislative Assembly of the Vologda Oblast, receiving 24.3% of the votes. He had to resign from this position in 2012 because of a criminal case opened against him.

Domozhirov gained public recognition in May 2012, when the police stopped buses transporting people from Vologda to the March of Millions. He eventually arrived late in Moscow and spoke from the stage, being the only one to speak using sound amplification technology. The same year in June, his car was shot at by unknown individuals while he was traveling to Moscow for the March of Millions.

In 2013, Domozhirov announced his participation in the elections for the Head of Vologda and the Legislative Assembly. However, he was denied registration for the Legislative Assembly elections due to a two-day delay in submitting signatures to the election commission. His signatures for the mayoral elections were accepted on the same day, but he was denied registration due to more than a hundred signatures being deemed invalid. After this, Domozhirov announced three possible options for the development of events: to sue the election commission, support Alexander Lukichev in the elections, or join Alexei Navalny's election campaign in Moscow.

Upon publicly criticising the Russian invasion of Ukraine in 2022, Domozhirov was five times convicted of spreading misinformation about the Russian army. The politician left the country in 2022, and was included in Russia's wanted list in October of the same year.

== Personal life ==
Domozhirov is married and has five children.
