= White-blue-white flag =

Symbol of opposition to the 2022 Russian invasion of Ukraine

- Russian anti-war flag
- Use: Symbol of opposition to the Russian invasion of Ukraine; Symbol of opposition to Vladimir Putin in Russia; Insignia of the anti-Putin partisan movement
- Proportion: 2:3 / 1:2
- Adopted: 28 February 2022; 4 years ago
- Design: A horizontal triband of white (top and bottom) and azure.
- Variant flag 1
- Proportion: 1:2
- Variant flag 2
- Proportion: 3:5

The white-blue-white flag (Russian: бело-сине-белый флаг, romanized: belo-sine-belyy flag) is a symbol of opposition to the Russian invasion of Ukraine that has been used by Russian anti-war protesters. It has also been used as a symbol of opposition to the current government of Vladimir Putin by several personal Internet accounts, and the Freedom of Russia Legion.

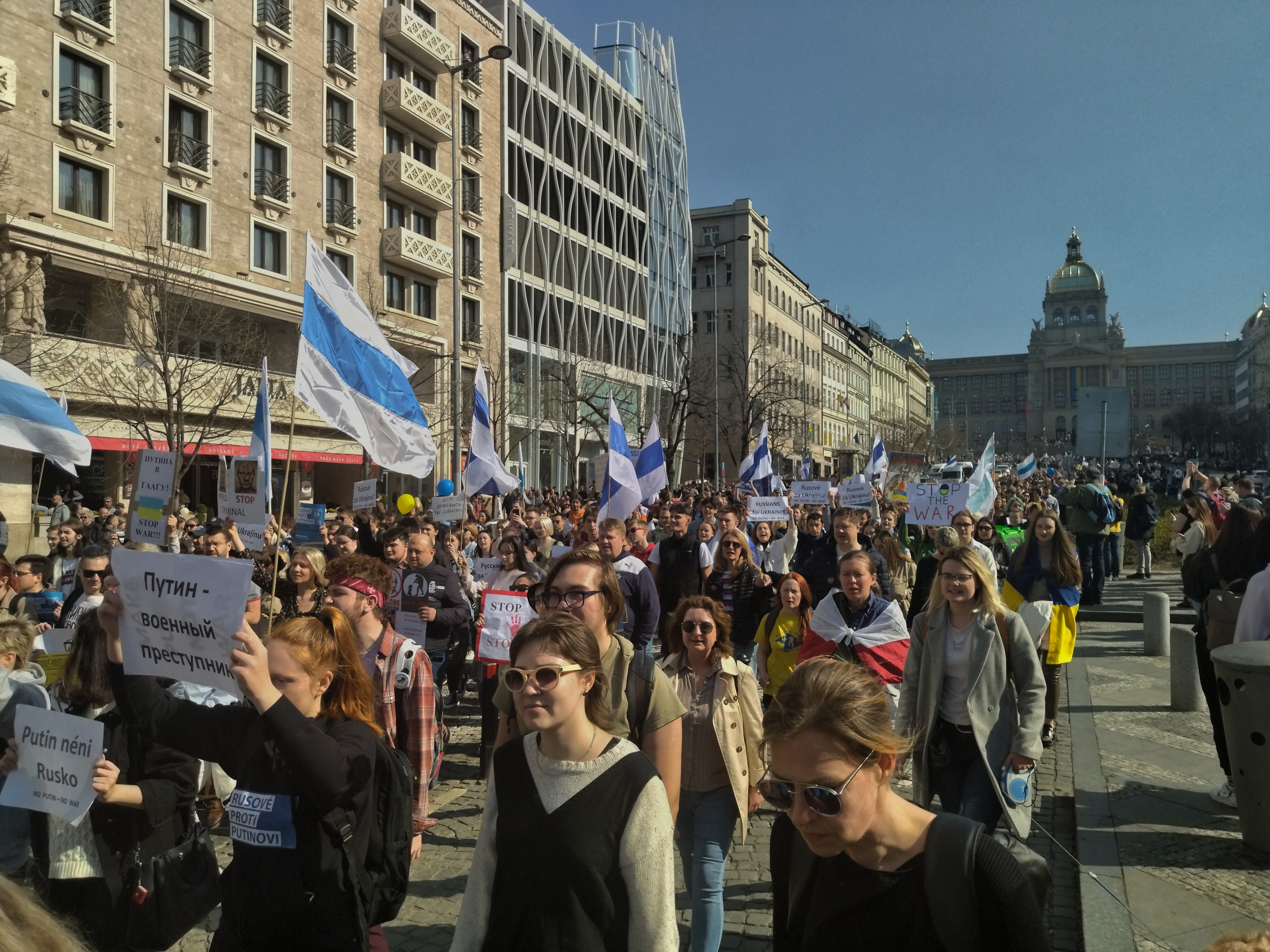
Protest of Russians living in Czech Republic against the war in Ukraine, on 26 March 2022

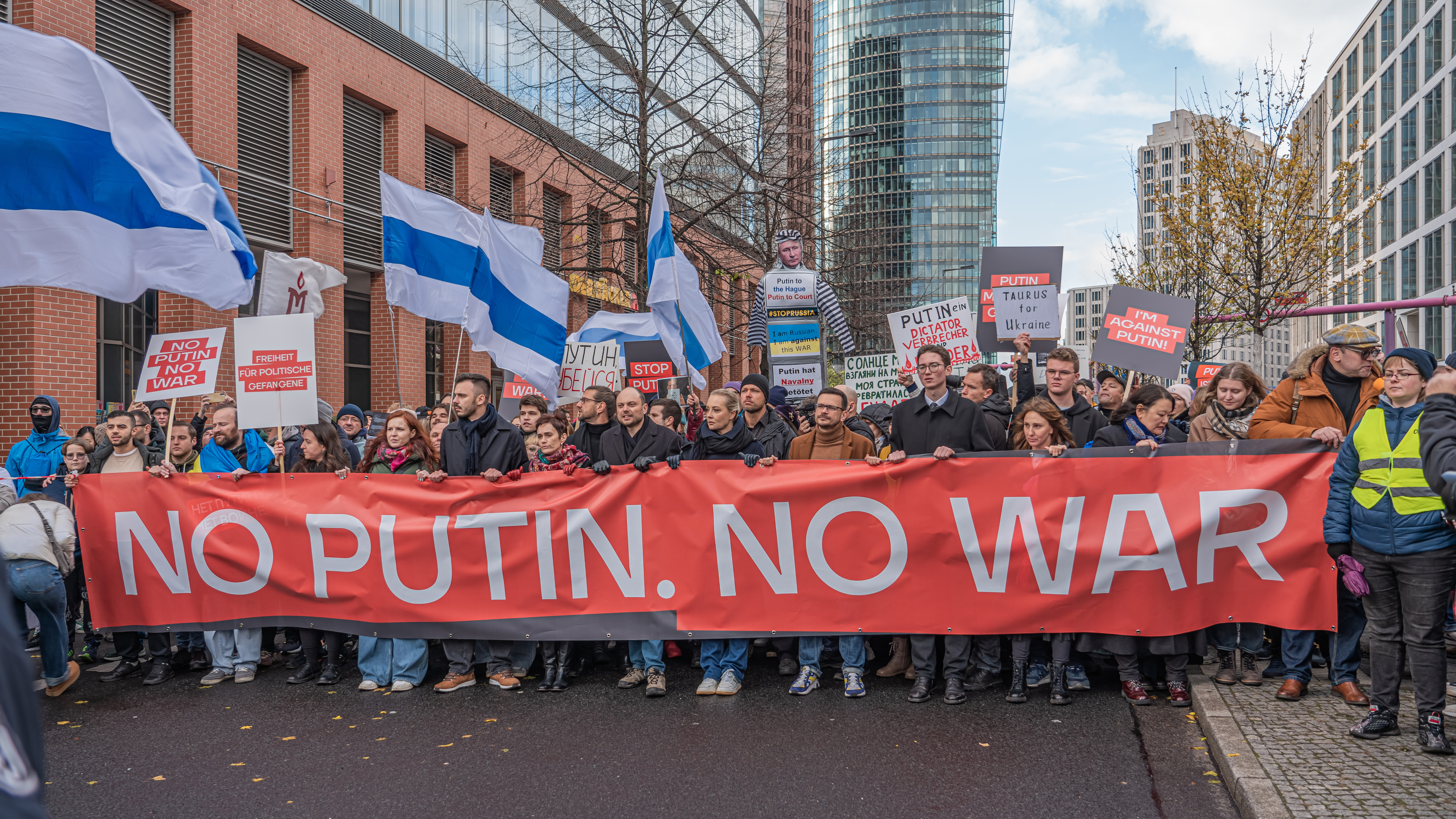
Vladimir Kara-Murza, Yulia Navalnaya and Ilya Yashin at an anti-war protest in Berlin, 17 November 2024

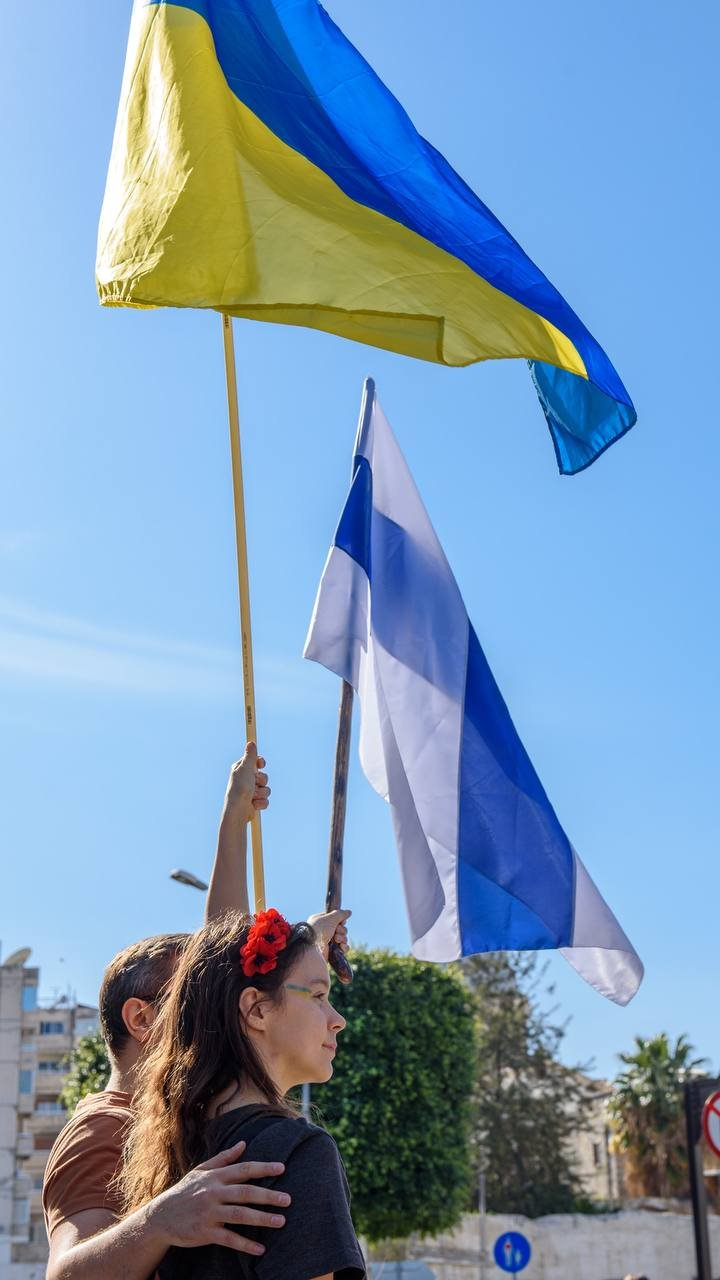
People flying the Russian anti-war flag and the flag of Ukraine in Limassol, Cyprus on 5 March 2022

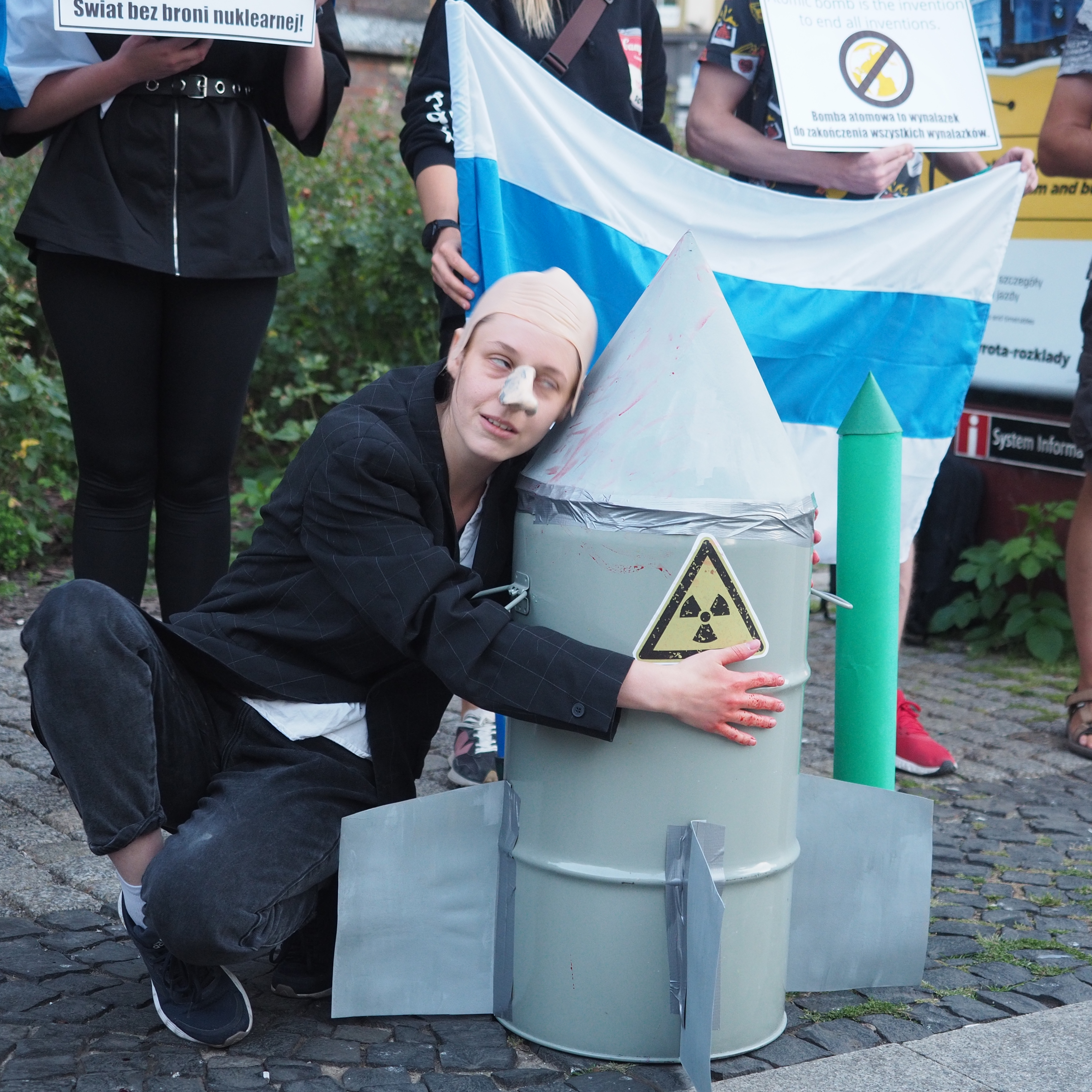
A Russian protester in Wrocław, Poland, dressed in a mock caricature of Putin with the Russian anti-war flag in the background

== Creation and symbolism ==
Several people created the idea of the white-blue-white flag shortly after the Russian invasion of Ukraine started on 24 February 2022. Kai Katonina, a Berlin-based user experience designer, and a Russia-based art manager with the pseudonym "Fish Sounds" (Звуки Рыб, Zvuki Ryb), also known as "AssezJeune", are each credited with having created the flag. It was first used on social media on 28 February 2022, and has been flown by Russian expatriates at various anti-war protests.

One of the stated reasons for replacing the red stripe of the flag of Russia by a white one is to remove the association with "blood and violence". AssezJeune, one of the flag's creators, stated: "The red on the modern Russian flag is associated not just with blood, but with its military power and authoritarian strength. So, this is not just the removal of blood, but, most importantly, the removal of the cult of militarism and violence. WBR is a historical authoritarian flag introduced by Tsarist Russia. It's also associated with militarism, with Russian imperial cores."

The flag is not used by all anti-war activists and opposition parties, and several opposition activists (such as Maria Motuznaya) have criticized AssezJeune's reasons for removing the red stripe.

== Usage and reactions ==
Use of the flag began shortly after the start of the invasion, and the flag began to garner wide appeal among protesters who oppose the war. The white-blue-white flag has an official website, where it is described as the "Flag of the Wonderful Russia of the Future" and "A symbol of freedom and peace"; the website includes background information in multiple languages. The flag has not been associated with representing a single organization exclusively, and several anti-war organisations have demonstrated support for it as a broader symbol of anti-war sentiment and unity. The similarity and analogy with the white-red-white flag that has been widely used during the 2020–2021 Belarusian protests is often listed as one of its advantages, as is the similarity to the flag of Veliky Novgorod, in which the government of the Novgorod Republic had a reputation for developing democratic governance.

The white-blue-white flag has been used at anti-war protests in Tbilisi, Georgia, Berlin, Germany, Sofia, Bulgaria, Bern, Switzerland, Limassol, Cyprus, Prague, Czech Republic, The Hague, Netherlands, and Riga, Latvia. In addition, some media have reported that the flag has also been used by protesters in Yekaterinburg, Russia, although this claim has not been supported by any evidence.

On 31 March 2022, the head of the Duma commission on foreign interference, Vasily Piskarev, appealed to the Prosecutor General's Office to ban the white-blue-white Russian flag as extremist, since "this symbolism is used in protests against the military operation in Ukraine not only in Russia, but also in other countries".

Members of the Freedom of Russia Legion (Russian: Легион «Свобода России», romanized: Legion "Svoboda Rossii"), composed of Russians who defected from the Russian Armed Forces to Ukraine, have been seen wearing patches of the flag on their military uniforms.

The white-blue-white flag (as well as other symbols of Russia) was banned during the Equality Parade in Warsaw, held alongside KyivPride. KyivPride published a statement about possible provocations, labeling any intentions to "display Russian flags of any color" a provocation and an unacceptable step meant to advance the Russian agenda.

On 21 August 2022, the manifesto of a hitherto unknown partisan group within Russia, National Republican Army (NRA) (Russian: Национальная республиканская армия (НРА)), endorsed the adoption of the white-blue-white flag. The manifesto was issued following the car bomb assassination of Darya Dugina and read aloud by exiled Russian politician Ilya Ponomarev on his video outlet "February Morning" (Russian: Утро Февраля), and published via its affiliated Telegram-based news service "Rospartisan" (Russian: Роспартизан). The white-blue-white flag motif is employed by February Morning on the air and in its social media profiles.

On 22 May 2023, the Freedom of Russia Legion posted videos showing the flag being lifted with balloons flying in the center of Moscow following the Belgorod Oblast incursion, which they claimed credit for.

=== In culture ===
On 16 September 2022, rapper Oxxxymiron released an anti-war video for the song "Oyda", which refers to the white-blue-white flag: "Our flag has white snow and a blue river (and that's it!)"

== Gallery ==
=== Flags ===
The current flag of Russia, featuring the red stripe and darker blue

The flag of Russia used between 1991 and 1993 featured a lighter shade of blue

Flag of the Freedom of Russia Legion

Flag of Veyshnoria, used as an element of satire

The former state flag of Belarus was adopted by oppositionist parties and was used in the 2020–2021 Belarusian protests

=== Flags in use ===
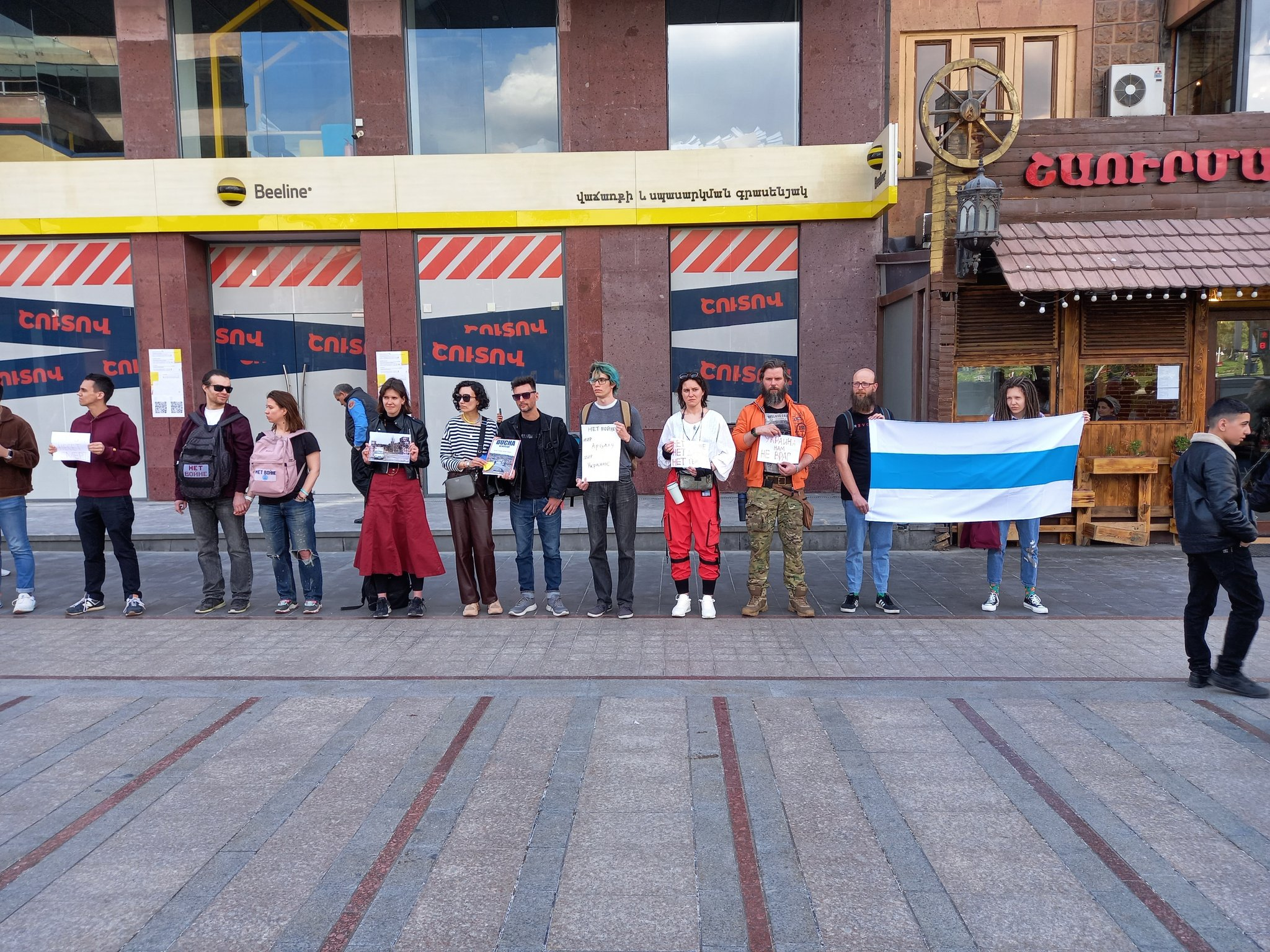
Protests of Russians in Yerevan against the war in Ukraine on 17 April 2022

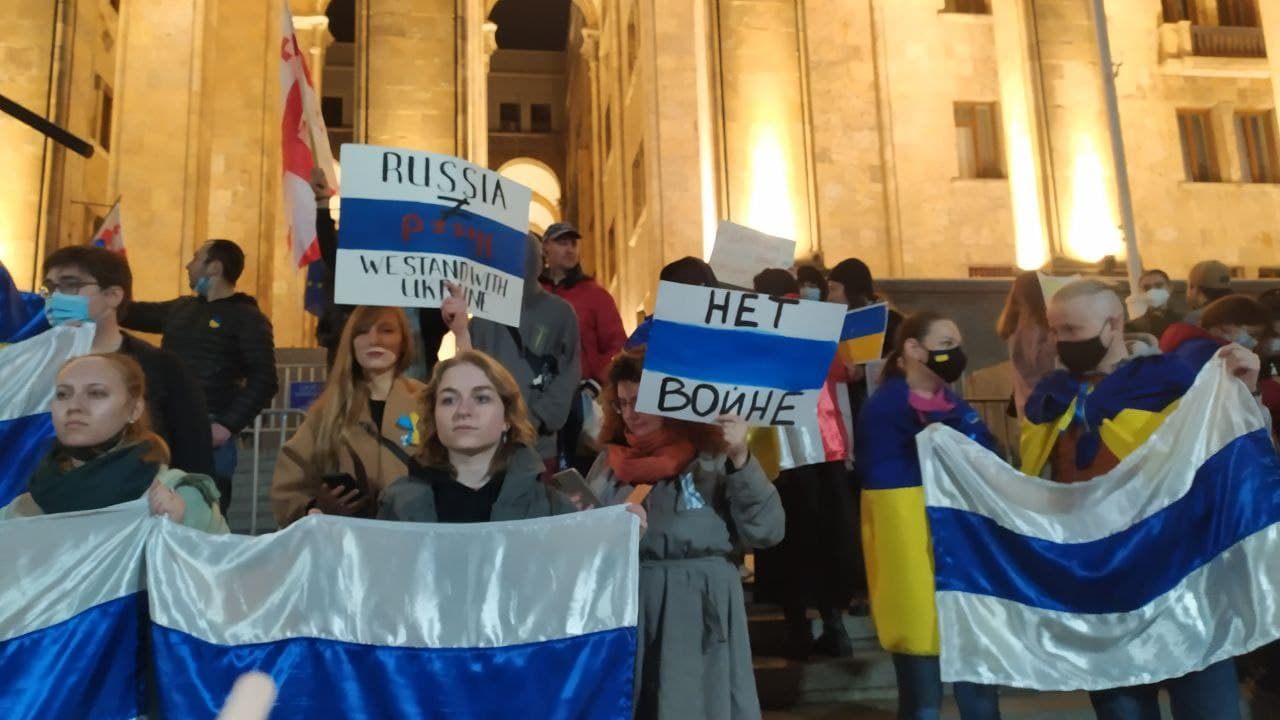
White-blue-white flag in Tbilisi, Georgia on 2 March 2022

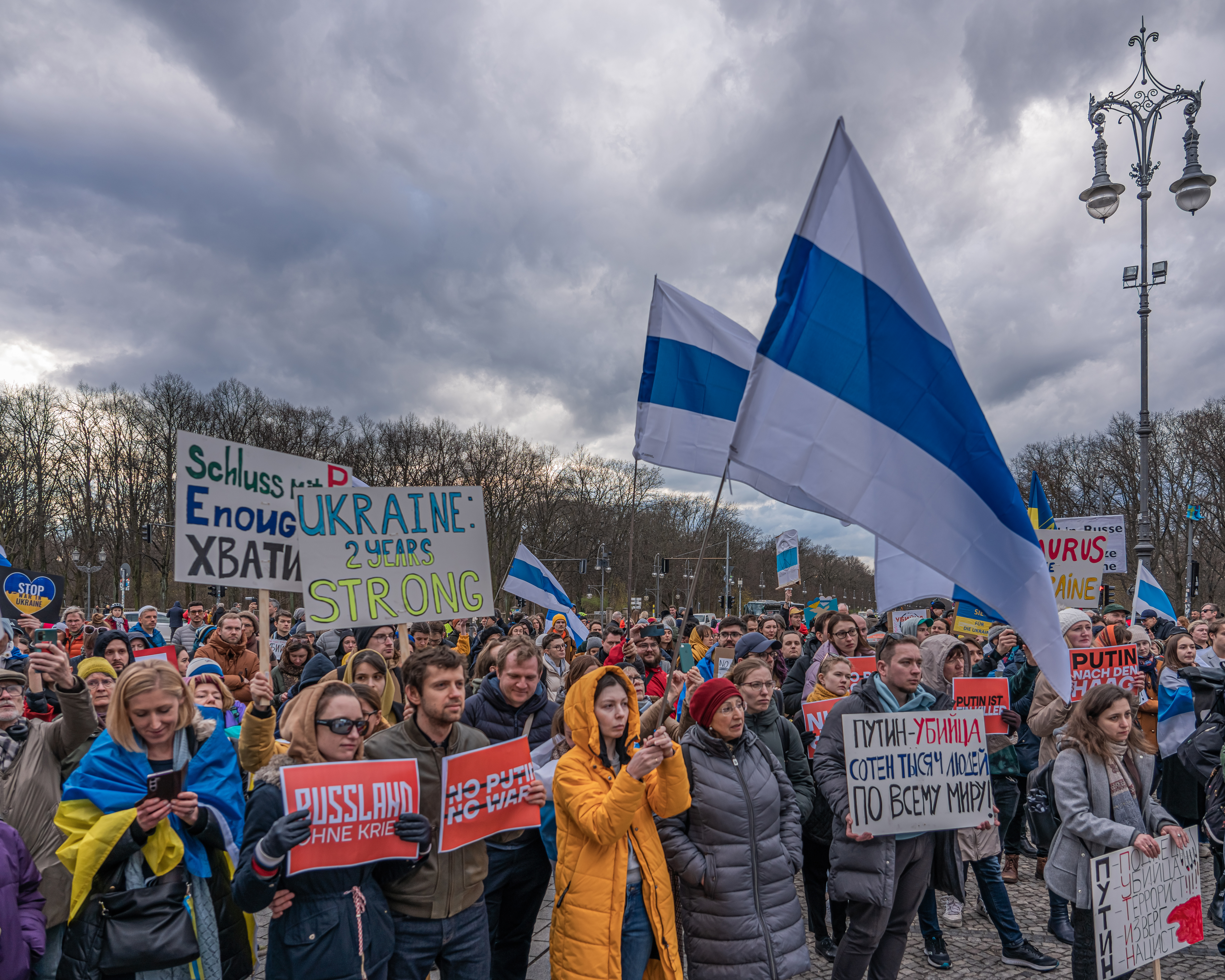
Protest of Russians in exile in Berlin, February 2024

=== The graphic style in use ===
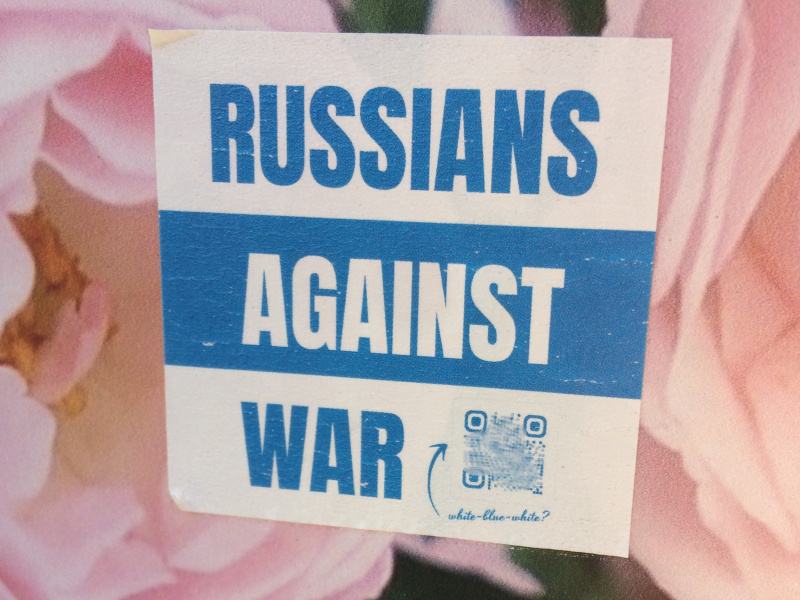
Anti-war protest sticker in Germany, August 2022

== See also ==
=== Anti-war topics ===
- Peace flag
- Green ribbon (Russia) – used by protesters against the Russian invasion of Ukraine
- Anti-war protests in Russia (2022–present)

=== Pro-war topics ===
- Z (military symbol) – used by supporters of the Russian invasion of Ukraine
- Ribbon of Saint George

=== Other opposition flags ===
- White-red-white flag – similar flag used by the Belarusian opposition
- Flag of South Vietnam, often used by Vietnamese diaspora
- Flag of Venezuela pre-2006, used by the Venezuelan opposition and diaspora
- Lion and Sun flag, former flag of Iran and Iranian opposition symbol
- Flag of the Second Spanish Republic, former flag of Spain and Spanish republican symbol
