= Russian Insurgent Army =

Paramilitary organization formed in 2014

- Russian: Русская Повстанческая Армия, romanized: Russkaya Povstancheskaya Armiya; Ukrainian: Російська Повстанська Армія, romanized: Rosiiska Povstanska Armiia
- "Let's take back our country!" (Russian: Вернём себе Родину!, romanized: Vernyom sebe Rodinu!) (Ukrainian: Повернемо собі Батьківщину!, romanized: Povernemo sobi Batkivshchynu!)
- Dates active: 2014–present
- Country: Ukraine
- Allegiance: Ukraine: Armed Forces of Ukraine; Territorial Defense; International Legion (Ukraine)
- Ideology: Decommunization; Economic liberalization; Anti-Putinism; National conservatism
- Political position: Right-wing to far-right
- Size: Not disclosed

Russian Insurgent Army (Russian: Русская Повстанческая Армия, romanized: Russkaya Povstancheskaya Armiya; Ukrainian: Російська Повстанська Армія, romanized: Rosiiska Povstanska Armiia; РПА; RPA) is a paramilitary organization established on December 29, 2014, in Kyiv. The RPA is an organization of Russian refugees and emigrants who fight on the side of Ukraine as part of volunteer battalions.

== History ==
On January 22, 2015, at the request of the Russian Prosecutor General's Office, the video "Creation of the Russian Insurgent Army (RPA)" was added to the register of banned sites on YouTube for "calls to fight the Putin regime with weapons in hand". On January 28, 2015, Roskomnadzor added YouTube to the register of banned websites. During the same day, the video "Creation of the Russian Insurgent Army (RPA)" was removed from YouTube, after which YouTube was unblocked in Russia.

The RPA positions itself as the "army of the Russian opposition" in the confrontation between the opposition and the Russian government. The organization conducts underground activities in the territory of the Russian Federation.

The requirements and goals of the RPA are set out in the manifesto:

- The overthrow of the Putin regime and the neo-Soviet nomenklatura, based on the power of violence and oppression, which appropriated the wealth and resources of the peoples of Russia;
- The cessation of the war in Ukraine and any attempts by revanchist forces to incite interethnic conflicts in the post-Soviet space;
- Consolidation of the national sovereignty of the Russian people in the Russian Federation and in the world.

== Direct actions ==
- October 27, 2016, An arson attack on the headquarters of the "Troll Factory" in St. Petersburg was claimed by the RPA, although there was a Molotov cocktail attack the night before on October 26.
- November 16, 2016, Arson of the house of the governor of the Volgograd region Andrey Bocharov.
- March 2, 2017, Assassination of the former United Russia deputy of the Iskitim district of the city of Berdsk, Vladimir Shevtsov.

== See also ==
- Freedom of Russia Legion
- National Republican Army (Russia)
- Russian Volunteer Corps
