= Combat Organization of Anarcho-Communists =

Underground organization in Russia and Belarus

- Боевая организация анархо-коммунистов
- Other name: BOAK
- Founder: Dmitry Petrov †
- Leader: Decentralized leadership
- Dates active: 18 April 2022–present
- Country: Russia
- Allegiance: Russian opposition
- Ideology: Anarcho-communism; Insurrectionary anarchism; Anti-imperialism; Anti-Putinism; Anti-authoritarianism
- Political position: Far-left
- Status: Active
- Website: boakmirror.noblogs.org

The Combat Organization of Anarcho-Communists (Russian: Боевая организация анархо-коммунистов, romanized: Boyevaya organizatsiya anarkho-kommunistov; BOAK) is a militant anarcho-communist organization in Eastern Europe, part of the Russian partisan movement. It aims for social revolution and a libertarian socialist society. Since the start of the 2022 Russian invasion of Ukraine, it has sabotaged railway infrastructure in Russia, as well as attacking Russian military commissariats and telecommunications. According to The Insider, the group has become "the most active 'subversive' force" in Russia since the war began.

== History ==
The group's blog has been active since at least September 2020. In their interviews, members of the group said that the organization has existed for years before it decided to engage in partisan activity after the 2022 Russian invasion of Ukraine. The BOAK-affiliated 'Anarchist Fighter' website and Telegram channel have existed since 2018.

== Opposition to the 2022 Russian invasion of Ukraine ==
During the 2022 Russian invasion of Ukraine, BOAK claimed responsibility for actions designed to disrupt the logistics of the Russian Army in the Russian Federation, organizing sabotage, arson of military registration and enlistment offices and rail war in Russia. A spokesperson for BOAK stated, "The war in Ukraine, unleashed by the Russian state, is a terrible tragedy, but the war created opportunities for the revolutionary minority, through partisan actions, to deepen the crisis of the system."

The name BOAK came to public attention for the first time on 18 April 2022, when the group claimed responsibility for the sabotage of a cell phone tower near the village of Belomestnoye in Belgorod Oblast, a border region with Ukraine. The aim of the attack was declared to be the damaging of the military communication network.

On 23 May 2022 BOAK claimed a sabotage action against military railway tracks leading to the 12th Chief Directorate of the Russian Ministry of Defense near Sergiyev Posad in Moscow Oblast. According to the BOAK website, some rails were deconstructed.

On 28 June 2022 the cell "BOAK-Vladimir" published a press release claiming sabotage action on railway of military unit 55443 VD Barsovo (51st Arsenal of the Main Missile and Artillery Directorate of the Ministry of Defense of the Russian Federation) near Kirzhach in Vladimir Oblast. The rails were damaged. BOAK's press release stated, "Every stopped train helps to get rid of missiles and rockets, which could hit peaceful Ukrainian cities!"

On 9 October 2022, BOAK posted photos of sabotaged railway tracks in Barnaul, claiming that the sabotage had successfully derailed a freight train.

In an interview with British journalist Jake Hanrahan, members of BOAK claimed that they found their targets using intelligence from Wikimapia, an open source mapping project that details the location of Russian military infrastructure. One of the interviewees said that they were willing to die fighting the Russian state, rather than be subjected to torture in a Russian prison.

In January 2023, BOAK claimed responsibility for an explosion that damaged a section of the Trans-Siberian Railway in Krasnoyarsk.

On 19 April 2023, Dmitry Petrov, one of the organisation's founders, was killed in the battle of Bakhmut while fighting for the Ukrainian Territorial Defense Forces.

On 24 June 2023, the Combat Organization of Anarcho-Communists issued a communique in reaction to the Wagner Group rebellion, stating that: "neither the Putin regime nor Prigozhin are our friends. In this fight between two cannibals, anarchists should stay away—let them bleed each other as much as possible. That way, they won't be able to disturb people in the future." They called upon the Russian people to "spend this time preparing for an armed uprising".

== See also ==
- Anarchism in Belarus
- Anarchism in Russia
- Anti-War Committee of Russia
- Feminist Anti-War Resistance
- National Republican Army (Russia)
- Network (Russia)
- Stop the Wagons
