= Gorkovsky District =

Gorkovsky District Горьковский район (Russian)
- District
- Flag
- Location of Gorkovsky District on the map of Omsk Oblast
- Coordinates: 55°21′50″N 74°21′25″E
- Country: Russia
- Federal subject: Omsk Oblast
- Administrative center: Gorkovskoye

Area
  - Total: 3,000 km^{2} (1,200 sq mi)

Population (2010 Census)
  - Total: 20,807
  - Density: 6.9/km^{2} (18/sq mi)
  - Urban: 25.8%
  - Rural: 74.2%

Administrative structure
  - Administrative divisions: 1 Work settlements, 11 Rural okrugs
  - Inhabited localities: 1 urban-type settlements, 47 rural localities

Municipal structure
  - Municipally incorporated as: Cherlaksky Municipal District
  - Municipal divisions: 1 urban settlements, 11 rural settlements
- Time zone: UTC+6 (MSK+3)
- OKTMO ID: 52609000
- Website: http://www.gork.omskportal.ru/

Gorkovsky District (Russian: Го́рьковский райо́н) is an administrative and municipal district (raion), one of the thirty-two in Omsk Oblast, Russia. It is located in the eastern central part of the oblast. The area of the district is 3,000 square kilometers (1,200 sq mi). Its administrative center is the urban locality (a work settlement) of Gorkovskoye. Population: 20,807 (2010 Census); 24,718 (2002 census); 28,038 (1989 Soviet census). The population of Gorkovskoye accounts for 25.8% of the district's total population.
