= Russian Action Committee =

Russian Action Committee Российский комитет действия
- Abbreviation: RAC (English); RKD (Russian)
- Leader: Garry Kasparov; Mikhail Khodorkovsky
- Founders: Garry Kasparov; Mikhail Khodorkovsky; Sergey Aleksashenko; Dmitry Gudkov; Sergey Guriyev; Boris Zimin; Yulia Latynina; Ivan Tyutrin; Evgeny Chichvarkin
- Founded: 20 May 2022
- Headquarters: Vilnius, Lithuania
- Ideology: Liberal democracy Anti-Putinism; Anti-war
- Political position: Big tent
- National affiliation: Anti-War Committee of Russia
- Colours: White-blue-white flag

Party flag

Website
- ruskd.com

The Russian Action Committee (RAC; Russian: Российский комитет действия, romanized: Rossiyskiy komitet deystviya, RKD) is a coalition movement of the Russian opposition in exile, formed on May 20, 2022 at the II Anti-War Conference of the Free Russia Forum in Vilnius, Lithuania. The movement was co-founded by Garry Kasparov, and Mikhail Khodorkovsky.

Garry Kasparov listed three main postulates of the RKD program document: recognition that the attack on Ukraine is a criminal war; that it was unleashed by the illegitimate regime of Vladimir Putin; and recognition of the territorial integrity of Ukraine, including Crimea and Donbas.

Representatives of the RKD advocate for the creation of the so-called "good Russian" passport for those who oppose the war with Ukraine.

In August 2022, the Committee stated that it was organizing a meeting titled "Congress of Free Russia" with the participation of Western politicians. The organizers of the event say "the task of the Congress is to unite the efforts of the most active anti-war part of Russian society and the free Western world in support of Ukraine and opposition to the regime of Vladimir Putin." The Congress was held from 31 August to 2 September under the slogan "Be brave like Ukraine". The congress was attended by Viktor Shenderovich, Dmitry Bykov, Gennady Gudkov, Vladislav Inozemtsev, Yevgeny Kiselyov, as well as the Head of the Foreign Affairs Committee of the Seimas of Lithuania Žygimantas Pavilionis and ex-Prime Minister of Georgia Vano Merabishvili. The Congress concluded with the words "We will continue to invite and offer asylum to all who fight for freedom and help Ukraine win."

In late 2023, the Russian Action Committee was designated as "undesirable" in Russia.

== Blacklisting of Ponomarev ==
On 21 August 2022, exiled former parliamentarian Ilya Ponomarev read aloud a manifesto of the National Republican Army (NRA) calling for armed action against the regime. The manifesto was released following the killing of Darya Dugina, for which the NRA also issued a claim of responsibility. Ponomarev endorsed both the assassination and the manifesto. The following day, the Russian Action Committee blacklisted Ponomarev from attending the Free Russia Congress on grounds that he had "called for terrorist attacks on Russian territory". The Committee's statement also implied that Dugina was a "civilian" who do not take part in the armed confrontation, and condemned denunciations of Alexandr Dugin following the attack as "a demonstrative rejection of normal human empathy for the families of the victims".

== See also ==
- Free Russia Forum
- Free Nations of Russia Forum
- Anti-War Committee of Russia
- Feminist Anti-War Resistance
- National Republican Army (Russia)
- True Russia
