= Opposition to Vladimir Putin in Russia =

Russian opposition
- The white-blue-white flag, which is currently used by various opposition groups and individuals since 2022
- Date: 31 March 2001 – present (25 years, 7 months, 2 weeks and 4 days)
- Location: Russia
- Caused by: Authoritarianism; Kleptocracy; Political repression; Corruption; Russo-Ukrainian war (Post-2022)
- Methods: Demonstrations; Internet activism; Partisan activity (Post-2022)
- Status: Ongoing

Parties
| Opposition; Russian United Democratic Party "Yabloko"; People's Freedom Party; Russia of the Future; Libertarian Party of Russia; The Other Russia of E. V. Limonov; Open Russia; Anti-Corruption Foundation; Pirate Party of Russia; True Russia; Youth Democratic Movement "Vesna"; United Democratic Movement "Solidarnost"; Russian Socialist Movement; Left Socialist Action; Organisation of Communist Internationalists; Marxist Tendency; Revolutionary Workers' Party; Popular Resistance Association; Ethnic National Union; Free Idel-Ural; Congress of People's Deputies; Anarchists; Monarchists; Various non-governmental organizations; And others...: Partisans (post-2022); BOAK; Resistance Committee; Stop the Wagons; Black Bridge; National Republican Army; Freedom of Russia Legion; Armed Wing; Resistance of the Legion; Russian Volunteer Corps; Separatist partisans: North Caucasus partisans; (Circassia) Circassian nationalists; Ingush Independence Committee; ILA; Chechen militant groups; OBON; IADAT; Committee of Bashkir Resistance; Sibir Battalion; Karelian Group; Supported by: Ukraine (Belarus) Belarusian opposition European Union | (Russia) Government; Ministry of Internal Affairs; Police; Internal Troops (until 2016); Security Council; National Guard (since 2016); National Guard Forces Command; OMON; SOBR; Ministry of Defence; Armed Forces; Federal Security Service; Federal Protective Service; Investigative Committee; Roskomnadzor; Cossacks; Russian Railways; Political parties: All-Russia People's Front; United Russia; A Just Russia; All-Russian Political Party "Rodina"; National Liberation Movement; Russian Ecological Party "The Greens"; Communist Party of the Russian Federation; Liberal Democratic Party of Russia; Civic Platform; Essence of Time; Russian Liberation Movement «SERB»; Communists of Russia; Left Front; Russian Communist Workers' Party of the Communist Party of the Soviet Union; United Communist Party; Eurasia Party; Eurasian Youth Union; Russian All-People's Union; Great Russia; And others... Supported by: Belarus |

Lead figures
| Non-centralised leadership see below Some notable figures: Boris Nemtsov †; Alexei Navalny †; Yulia Navalnaya Notable partisans and supporters: Dmitry Petrov †; Maximilian Andronnikov; Denis Kapustin; (Siberia) Vladislav Ammosov; Partisans supported by Ilya Ponomarev | Vladimir Putin (2000–2008, 2012–present); Dmitry Medvedev (2008–2012) |

Opposition to the government of President Vladimir Putin in Russia, commonly referred to as the Russian opposition, (Note: Russian: Политическая оппозиция в России, romanized: Politicheskaya oppozitsiya v Rossii, lit. 'Political opposition in Russia') can be divided between the parliamentary opposition parties in the State Duma and the various non-systemic opposition organizations. While the former are largely viewed as being more or less loyal to the government and Putin, the latter oppose the government and are mostly unrepresented in government bodies. According to Russian NGO Levada Center, about 15% of the Russian population disapproved of Putin at the beginning of 2023. The opposition to Putin's political views is also called anti-Putinism.

The "systemic opposition" is mainly composed of the Liberal Democratic Party of Russia (LDPR), the Communist Party of the Russian Federation (KPRF), A Just Russia (SRZP), New People and other minor parties; these political groups, while claiming to be in opposition, generally support the government's policies. It is therefore debated whether systemic groups that hold a formal title of "opposition" in Russia should be classified as such if they do not actually challenge the government.

Major political parties considered to be part of the non-systemic opposition include Yabloko and the People's Freedom Party (PARNAS), along with de-facto defunct Russia of the Future and Libertarian Party of Russia (LPR). Other notable opposition groups included the Russian Opposition Coordination Council (KSO) (2012–2013) and The Other Russia (2006–2011), as well as various non-governmental organizations (NGOs).

Their supporters vary in political ideology, ranging from liberals, communists, socialists, and anarchists to Russian nationalists. They are mainly unified by their opposition to Putin and government corruption. However, a lack of unity within the opposition has also hindered its standing. Opposition figures claim that a number of laws have been passed and other measures taken by Putin's government to prevent them from having any electoral success.

== Background and composition ==
The Guardian's report from Luke Harding noted that during the 2000s, Neo-Nazis, Russian nationalists, and ultranationalist groups were the most significant opposition to Putin's government.

Prominent Russian liberal opposition figure Alexei Navalny said before his 2020 poisoning that the Kremlin was "far more afraid of ultra-nationalists than they were of him", noting that "[the ultranationalists] use the same imperial rhetoric as Putin does, but they can do it much better than him".

On 4 March 2022, Russian President Vladimir Putin signed into law a bill introducing prison sentences of up to 15 years for spreading "fake news" about Russia's military operation in Ukraine; thousands of Russians have been prosecuted under this law for criticizing Russia's invasion of Ukraine, including opposition politician Ilya Yashin and artist Aleksandra Skochilenko. Persecution was directed against pro-democracy and anti-war Russians, while criticism of the Putin regime by pro-war activists and ultranationalists was largely ignored.

Levada Center polls from 2022 indicated that there were at least 30 million pro-European Russians who opposed the war in Ukraine, but very few of them were able to leave Russia. Literary critic Galina Yuzefovich said that leaving Russia is a "privilege" for those who can "afford it". Exiled opposition groups have adapted media strategies emphasizing values like anti-corruption and democracy to achieve virtual mobilization via platforms like Telegram and YouTube.

In 2022 and 2023, political experts in Russia and in the United States described the far-right ultranationalist opposition to Putin as possibly "the most serious challenge" to the Russian regime.

Some observers noted what they described as a "generational struggle" among Russians over the perception of Putin's rule, with younger Russians more likely to be against Putin and his policies and older Russians more likely to accept the narrative presented by state-controlled media in Russia. Putin's approval rating among young Russians was 32% in January 2019, according to the Levada Center. Another poll from the organization placed Putin's support among Russians aged 18–24 at 20% in December 2020.

== Actions and campaigns ==
Current campaigns of the opposition include the dissemination of anti-Putin reports such as Putin Must Go (2010), Putin. Results. 10 years (2010), Putin. Corruption (2011) and Life of a Slave on Galleys (2012). Video versions of these reports, entitled Lies of Putin's regime, have been viewed by about 10 million times on the Internet.

In addition, smaller-scale series of actions are conducted. For example, in Moscow in the spring of 2012 saw a series of flash mobs "White Square", when protesters walked through the Red Square with white ribbons, in the late spring and summer, they organized the protest camp "Occupy Abay" and autumn they held weekly "Liberty walks" with the chains symbolizing solidarity with political prisoners.

A monstration is a parody demonstration where participants gently poke fun at Kremlin policies.

== Participation in elections ==
Some opposition figures, for example, chess grandmaster Garry Kasparov, said there are no elections in Putin's Russia, and that participation in a procedure called elections only legitimizes the regime.

On the other hand, a small part of liberals (the party of "Democratic Choice") consider elections as the main tool to achieve their political goals.

== History ==
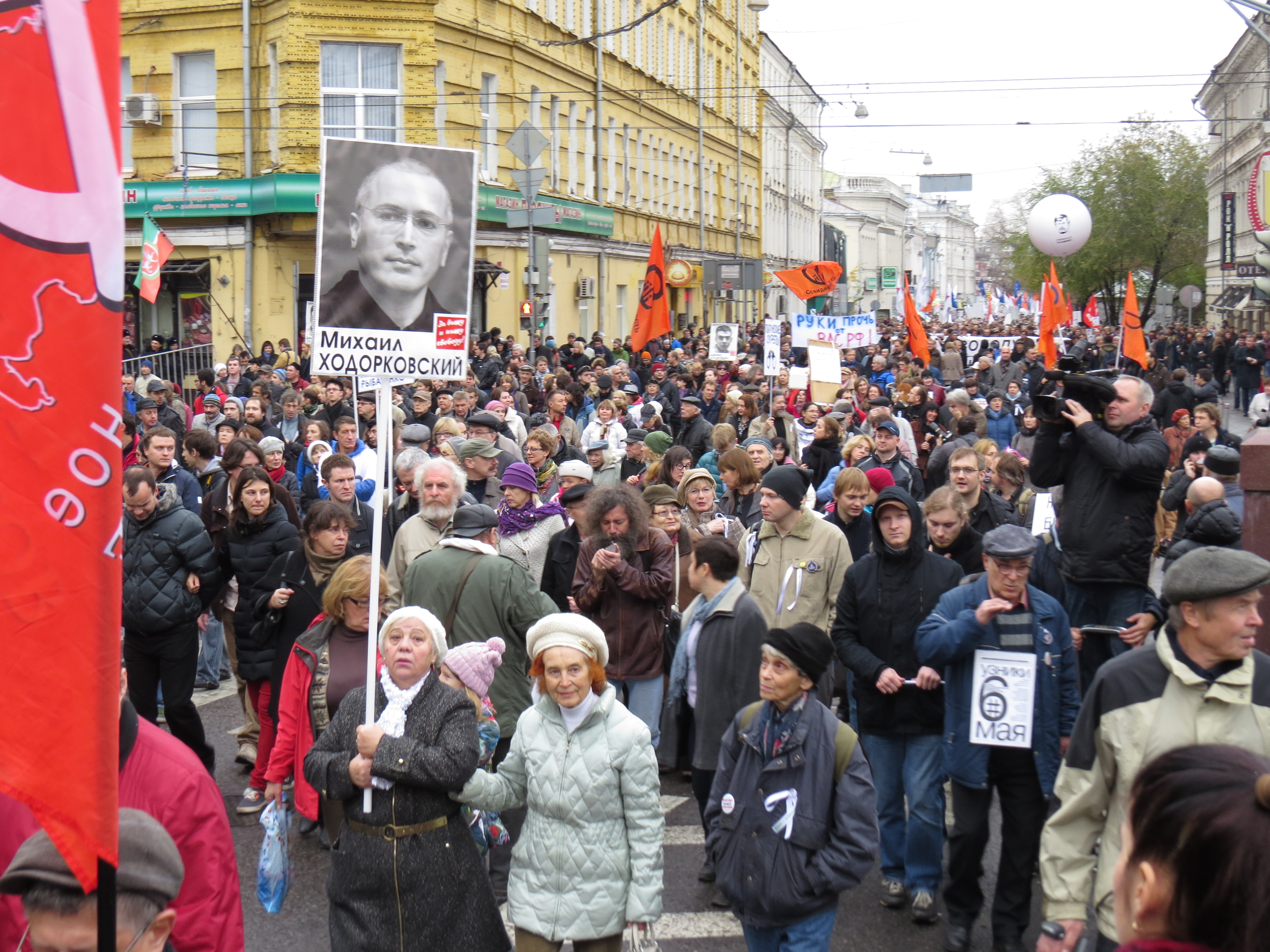
Rally in support of political prisoners in Russia, Moscow on 27 October 2013

=== 2001 "Save NTV" protests ===
One of the earliest acts of dissent against Vladimir Putin were the protests against the takeover of the independent television NTV by Putin-aligned Gazprom from 31 March to 14 April 2001. Members of the State Duma from the opposition, including Boris Nemtsov and Grigory Yavlinsky, were present and demanded the preservation of the ownership critical of the Russian government. The protester demands were not met.

=== 2004–2005 Russian benefits monetization protests ===
These protests were directed against Putin's economic reforms that were seen as primarily driven by a controversial social welfare overhaul and changes to Russia's political structure.

=== 2006–2008 Dissenters' March ===
The Dissenters' March was a series of Russian opposition protests started in 2006. It was preceded by opposition rallies in Russian cities in December 2005 which involved fewer people. Most of the Dissenters' March protests were unsanctioned by authorities. The Dissenters' March rally was organized by The Other Russia, a broad umbrella group that included opposition leaders, including the National Bolshevik Party with its leader Eduard Limonov, far-left Vanguard of Red Youth as well as liberals such as former world chess champion and United Civil Front leader Garry Kasparov.

=== 2009–2011 Strategy-31 ===
Strategy-31 was a series of civic protests in support of the right to peaceful assembly in Russia guaranteed by Article 31 of the Russian Constitution. Since 31 July 2009, the protests were held in Moscow on Triumfalnaya Square on the 31st of every month with 31 days. Strategy-31 was led by writer Eduard Limonov and human rights activist Lyudmila Alexeyeva.

=== 2011–2013 Russian protests ===
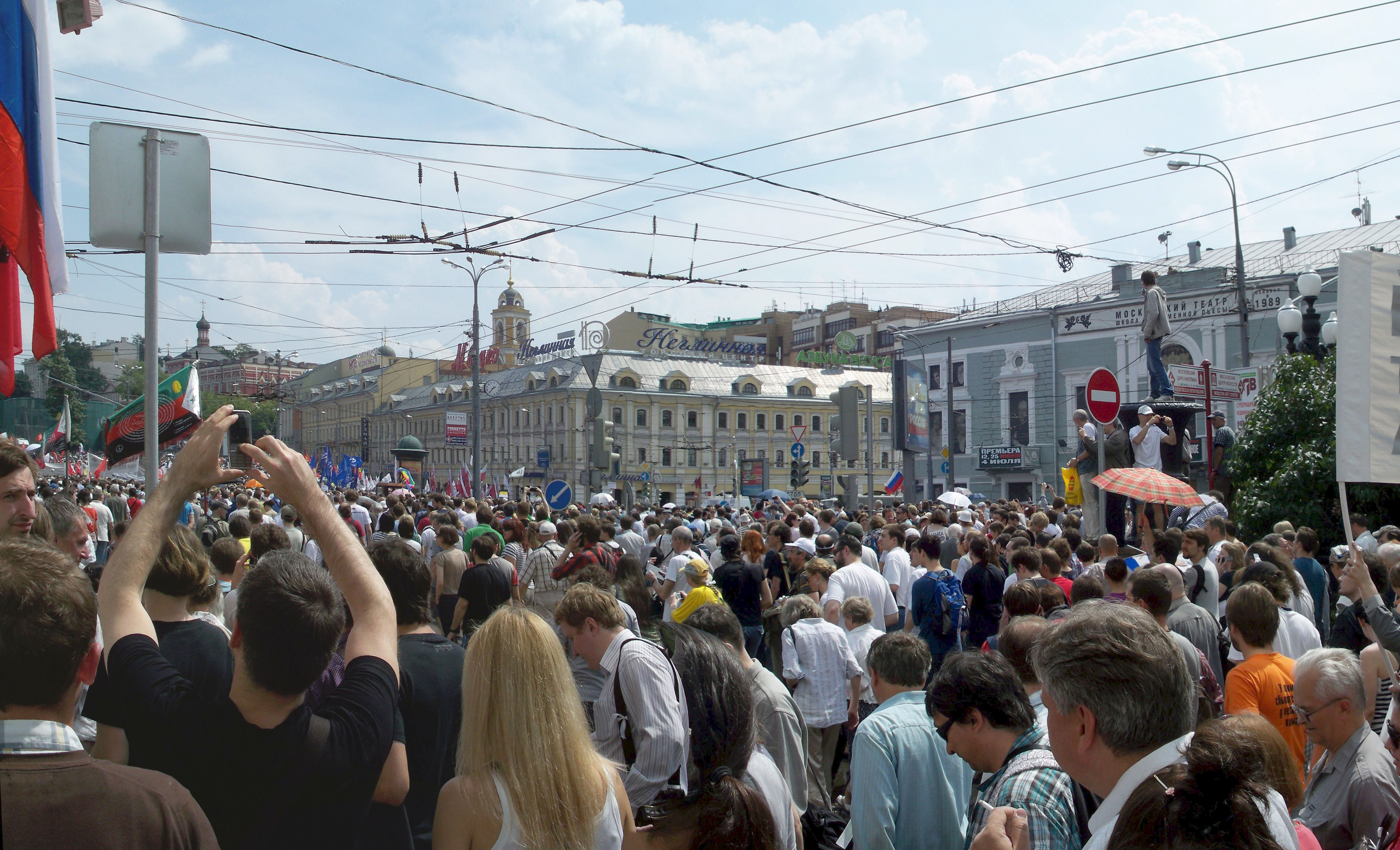
Anti-Putin protesters march in Moscow, 12 June 2012

Starting from 5 December 2011, the day after the elections to the State Duma, there have been repeated massive political actions of Russian citizens who disagree with the outcome of these "elections". The current surge of mass opposition rallies has been called in some publications "a snow revolution". These rallies continued during the campaign for the election of the President of Russia and after 4 March 2012, presidential election, in which Putin officially won the first round. The protesters claimed that the elections were accompanied by violations of the election legislation and widespread fraud. One of the main slogans of the majority of actions was "For Fair Elections!" and a white ribbon has been chosen as symbol of protests. Beginning from spring 2012 the actions were called marches of millions and took the form of a march followed by a rally. The speeches of participants were anti-Putin and anti-government.

The "March of Millions" on 6 May 2012 at the approach to Bolotnaya Square was dispersed by the police. In the Bolotnaya Square case 17 people are accused of committing violence against police (12 of them are in jail). A large number of human rights defenders and community leaders have declared the detainees innocent and the police responsible for the clashes.

For the rally on 15 December 2012, the anniversary of the mass protests against rigged elections, the organizers failed to agree with the authorities, and participation was low. Several thousand people gathered without placards on Lubyanka Square and laid flowers at the Solovetsky Stone.

=== 2014 anti-war protests ===
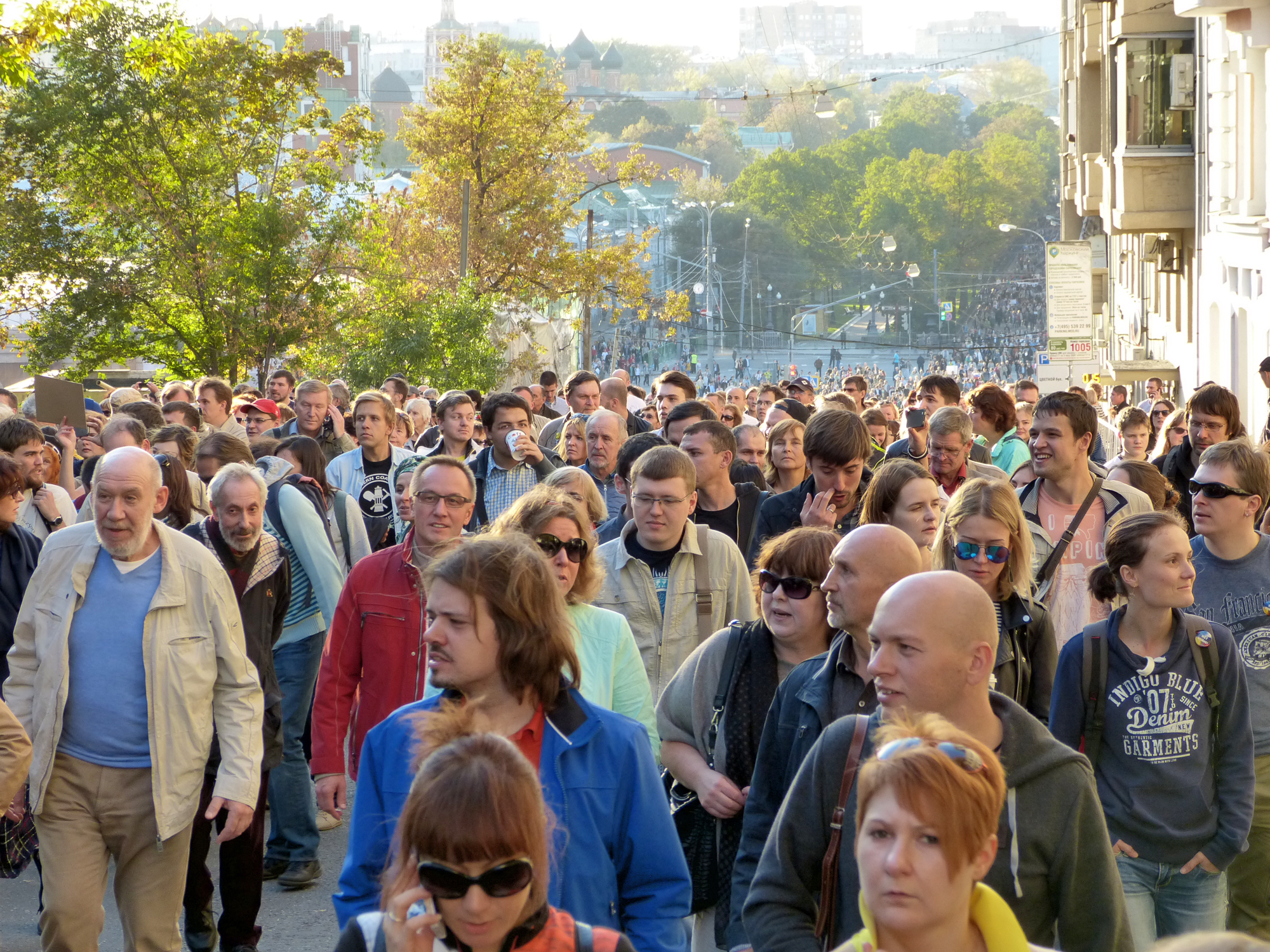
March for Peace, Moscow, 21 September 2014

In 2014, members of the Russian opposition have held anti-war protests in opposition to the Russian military intervention in Ukraine in the aftermath of the 2014 Ukrainian revolution and Crimean crisis. The March of Peace protests took place in Moscow on 15 March, a day before the Crimean status referendum. The protests have been the largest in Russia since the 2011 protests. Reuters reported that 30,000 people participated in 15 March anti-war rally.

=== 2017–2018 Russian protests ===
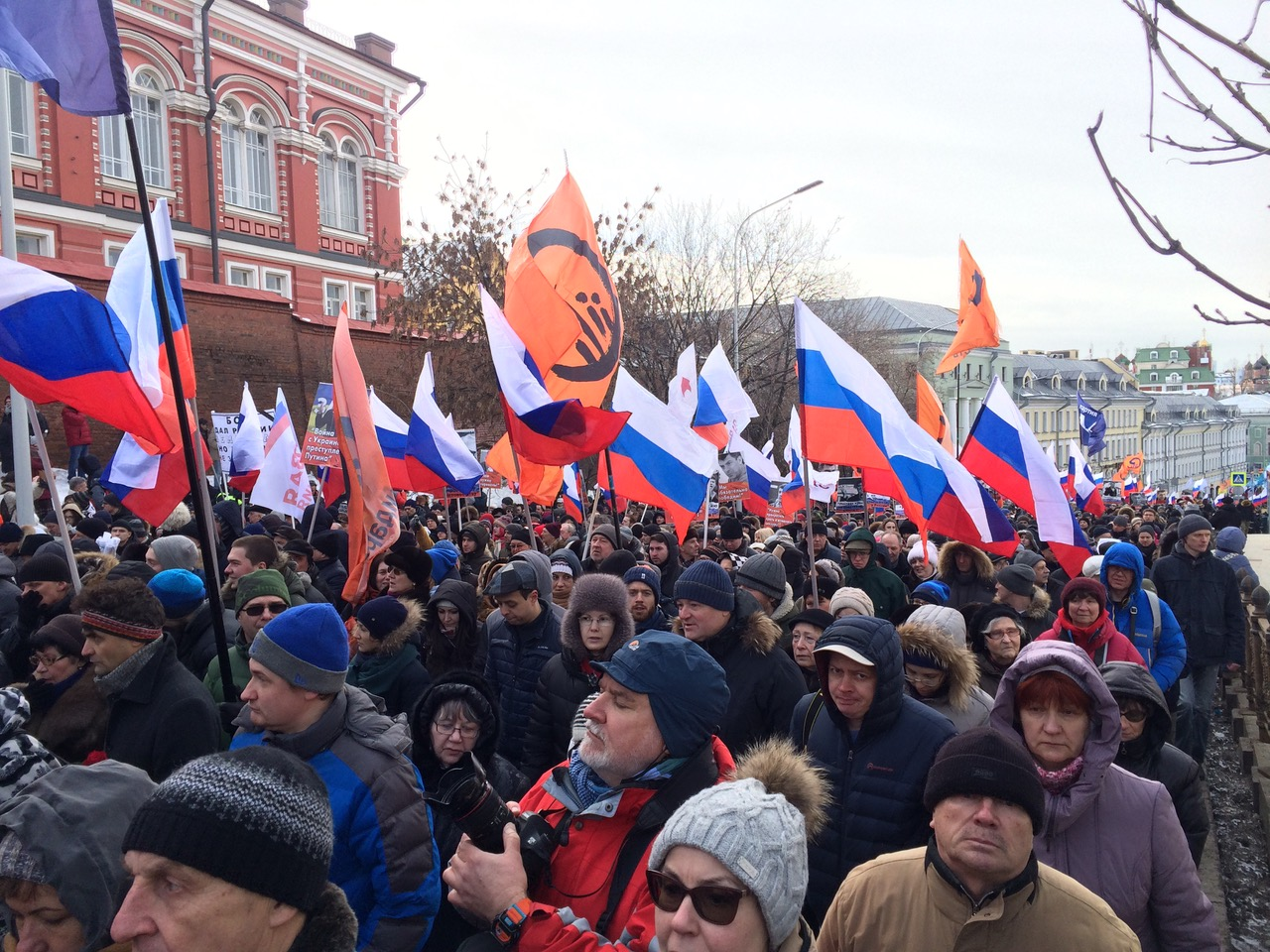
March in memory of Boris Nemtsov in Moscow, 26 February 2017

On 26 March 2017, protests against alleged corruption in the Russian government took place simultaneously in many cities across the country. The protests began after the release of the film He Is Not Dimon to You by Alexei Navalny's Anti-Corruption Foundation. An April 2017 Levada poll found that 45% of surveyed Russians supported the resignation of Russian Prime Minister Dmitry Medvedev, against it 33% of respondents. Newsweek reported that "An opinion poll by the Moscow-based Levada Center indicated that 38 percent of Russians supported the rallies and that 67 percent held Putin personally responsible for high-level corruption."

A May 2017 Levada poll found that 58% of surveyed Russians supported the protests, while 23% said they disapprove.

=== 2018 Russian pension protests ===
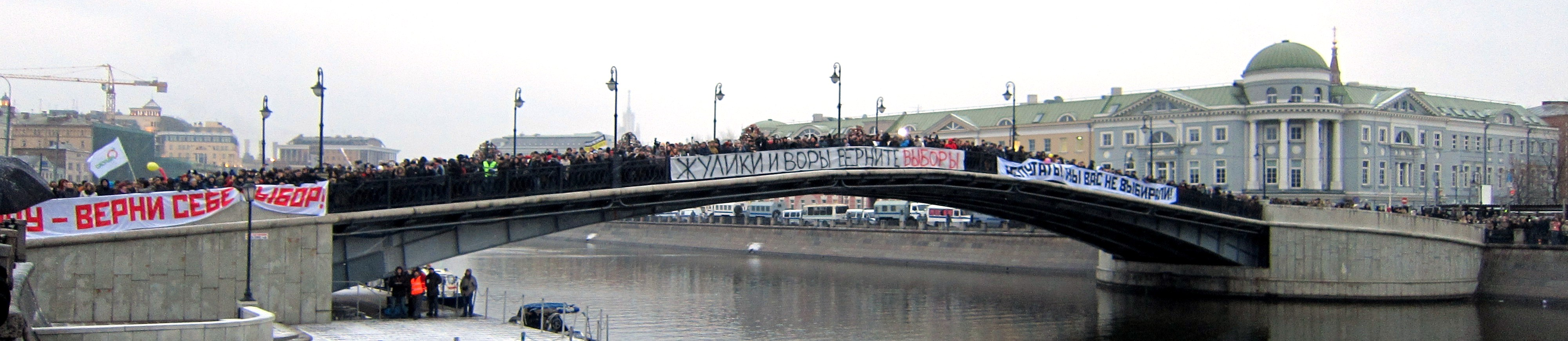
The rally for fair elections 10 December 2011 at the Bolotnaya Square in Moscow. Luzhkov Bridge with banners "Crooks and thieves, give us back elections", "Deputies, we have not chosen you!"

From July 2018, almost every weekend, protest rallies and demonstrations were organized against the planned retirement age hike. Such events occurred in nearly all major cities countrywide including Novosibirsk, St.-Petersburg and Moscow. These events were coordinated by all opposition parties with the leading role of the communists. Also trade unions and some individual politicians (among whom Navalny) functioned as organizers of the public actions.

An intention to hike the retirement age has drastically downed the rating of the President Vladimir Putin and Prime Minister Dmitry Medvedev in Russia. Due to this, just 49% would vote for Putin if the presidential elections were held in that moment in July 2018 (while during the elections in March 2018, he got 76.7%).

=== 2019 Russian protests ===
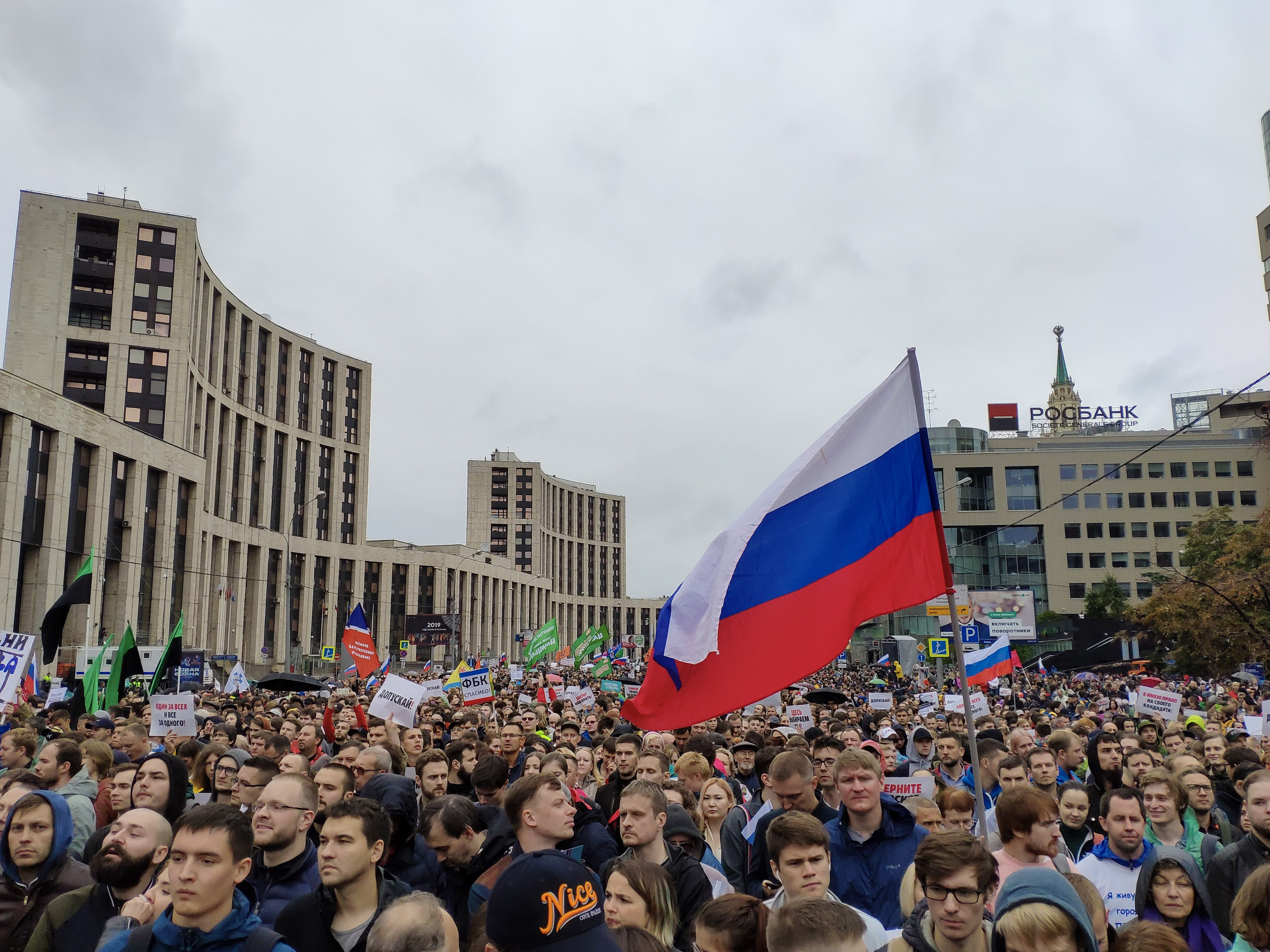
Moscow rally in support of opposition candidates for the Moscow City Duma. August 10, 2019.

In the first half of 2019 there were approximately 863 protests across the country.

From July 2019, protest rallies for an access to 2019 Moscow City Duma election of independent candidates started in Moscow. The 20 July rally was the largest since 2012. The 27 July rally set a record in number of detainees and police violence. The 10 August rally outnumbered the 27 July rally, oppositional sources report 50–60 thousand participants.

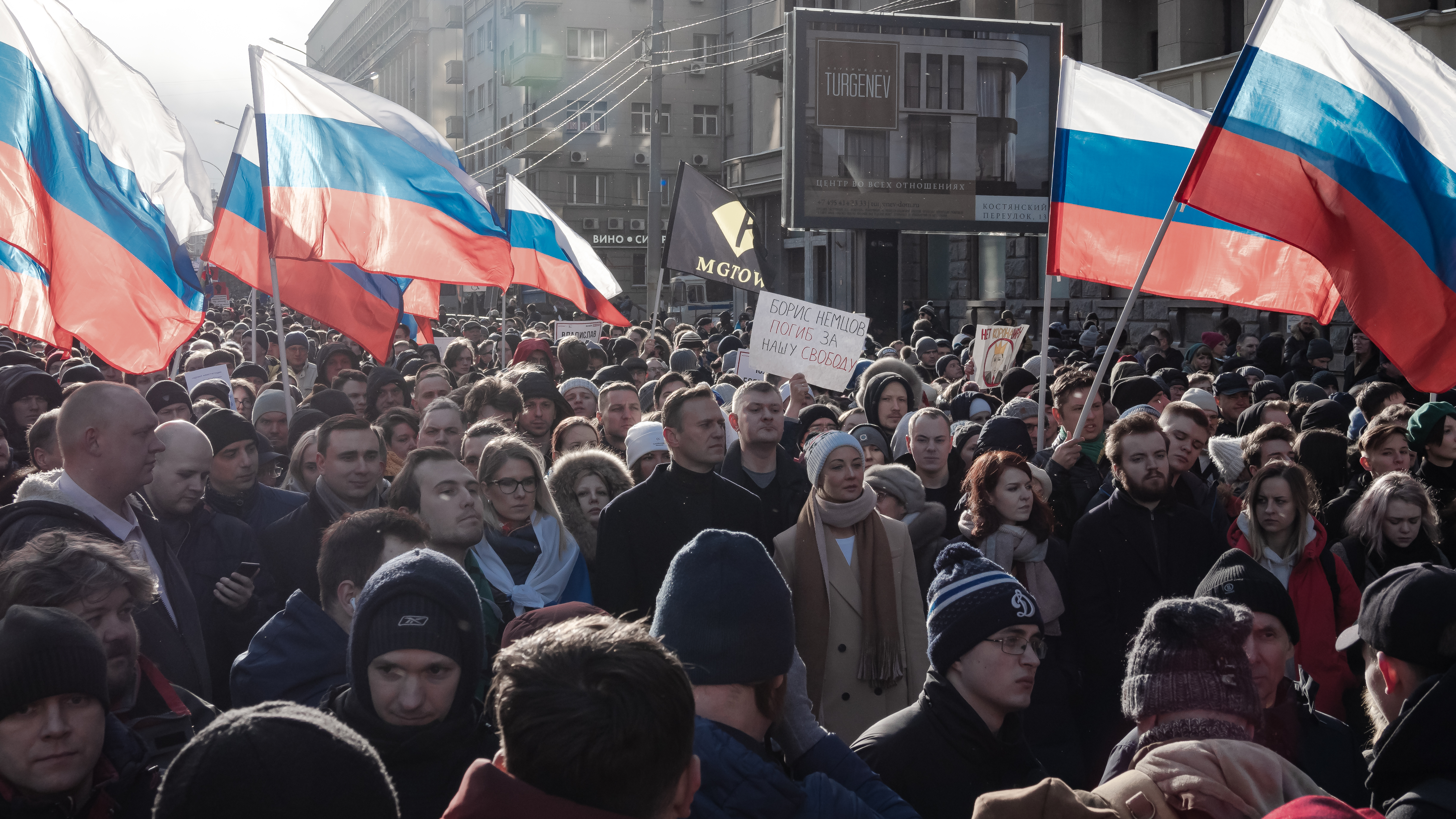
Opposition leader Navalny during the march in memory of Boris Nemtsov in Moscow on 29 February 2020

=== 2020 Russian protests ===
On 27 February 2020, Navalny, Yashin, Yavlinsky, Volkov, and many other opposition politicians were present on a march in memory of a killed former Deputy Prime Minister and Vladimir Putin's critic Boris Nemtsov. The demonstration included around 23,000 opposition supporters.

On 20 August 2020, Navalny was poisoned with Novichok, leading to his medical treatment in Berlin, Germany.

=== 2020–21 Khabarovsk Krai protests ===
On 9 July 2020, the popular governor of the Khabarovsk Krai, Sergei Furgal, who defeated the candidate of Putin's United Russia party in elections two years ago, was arrested and flown to Moscow. Furgal was arrested 15 years after the alleged crimes he is accused of. Every day since 11 June, mass protests have been held in the Khabarovsk Krai in support of Furgal. On 25 July, tens of thousands of people were estimated to have taken part in the third major rally in Khabarovsk. The protests included chants of "Away with Putin!", "This is our region", "Furgal was our choice" or "shame on LDPR" and "Shame on the Kremlin!"

In a Levada Center poll carried out from 24 to 25 July 2020, 45% of surveyed Russians viewed the protests positively, 26% neutrally and 17% negatively.

=== 2021 Navalny Protests ===
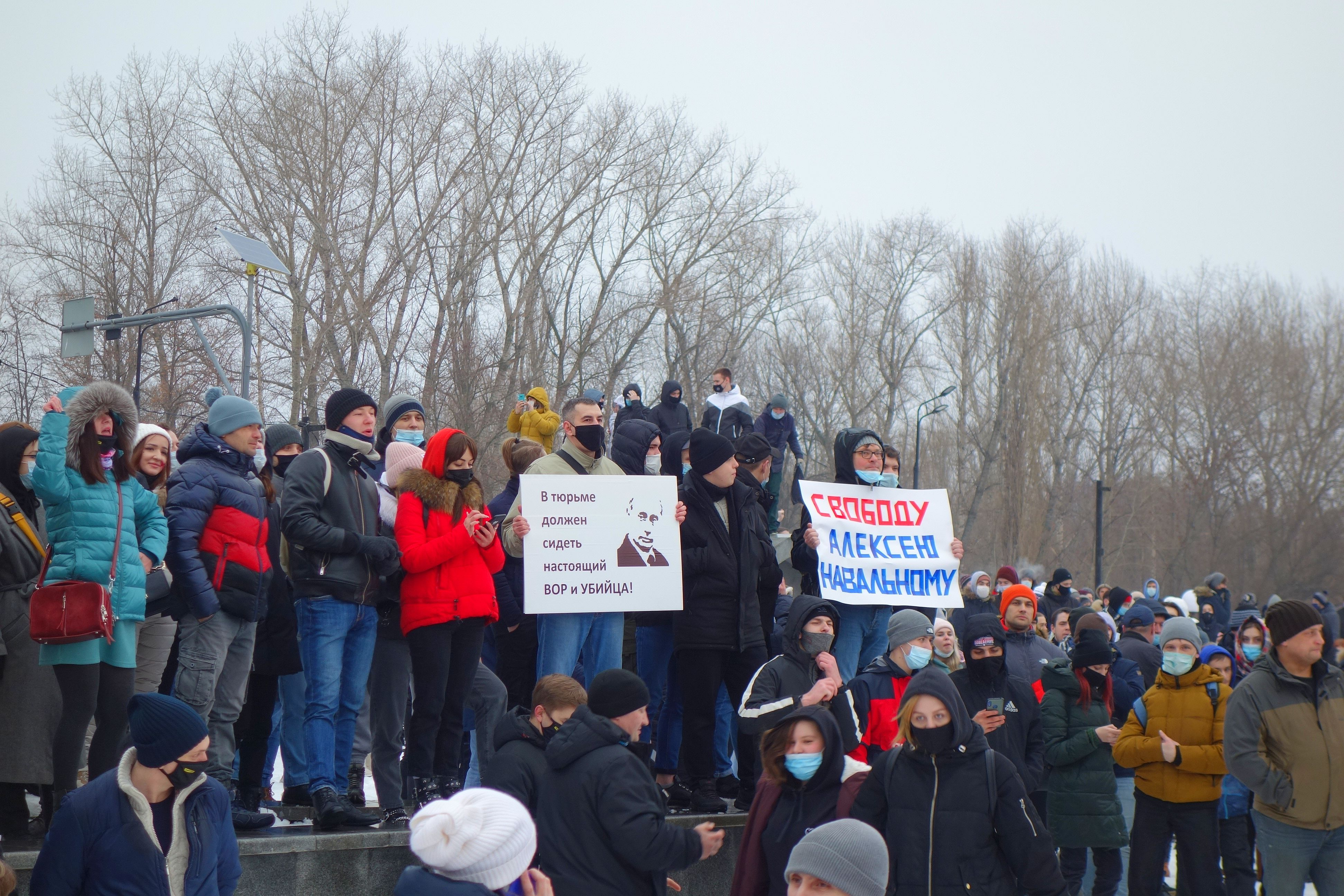
Protests in Lipetsk, 23 January 2021

On 23 January 2021, protests across Russia were held in support of the Russian opposition leader Alexei Navalny, who was detained and then jailed after returning to Russia on 17 January following his poisoning. A few days before the protests, an investigation by Navalny and his Anti-Corruption Foundation was published, accusing Putin of corruption. The video garnered 70 million views in a few days.

Since jailing of Navalny a "hardening of the course" was observed from the government side, with a choice of "go West or East" being offered to prominent opposition figures, meaning a non-negotiable alternative of either going on emigration ("West") or to prison colonies ("East"). Among those who left Russia are politicians Lyubov Sobol, Dmitry Gudkov, Ivan Zhdanov (whose father had been however arrested in Russia as a hostage), Kira Yarmysh, journalists Andrei Soldatov, Irina Borogan, Roman Badanin. The wave of repressions has been also linked with the September 2021 Duma elections.

=== 2021 Russian election protests ===
Protests against alleged large-scale fraud in favour of the ruling party were held.

=== 2022 anti-war protests ===
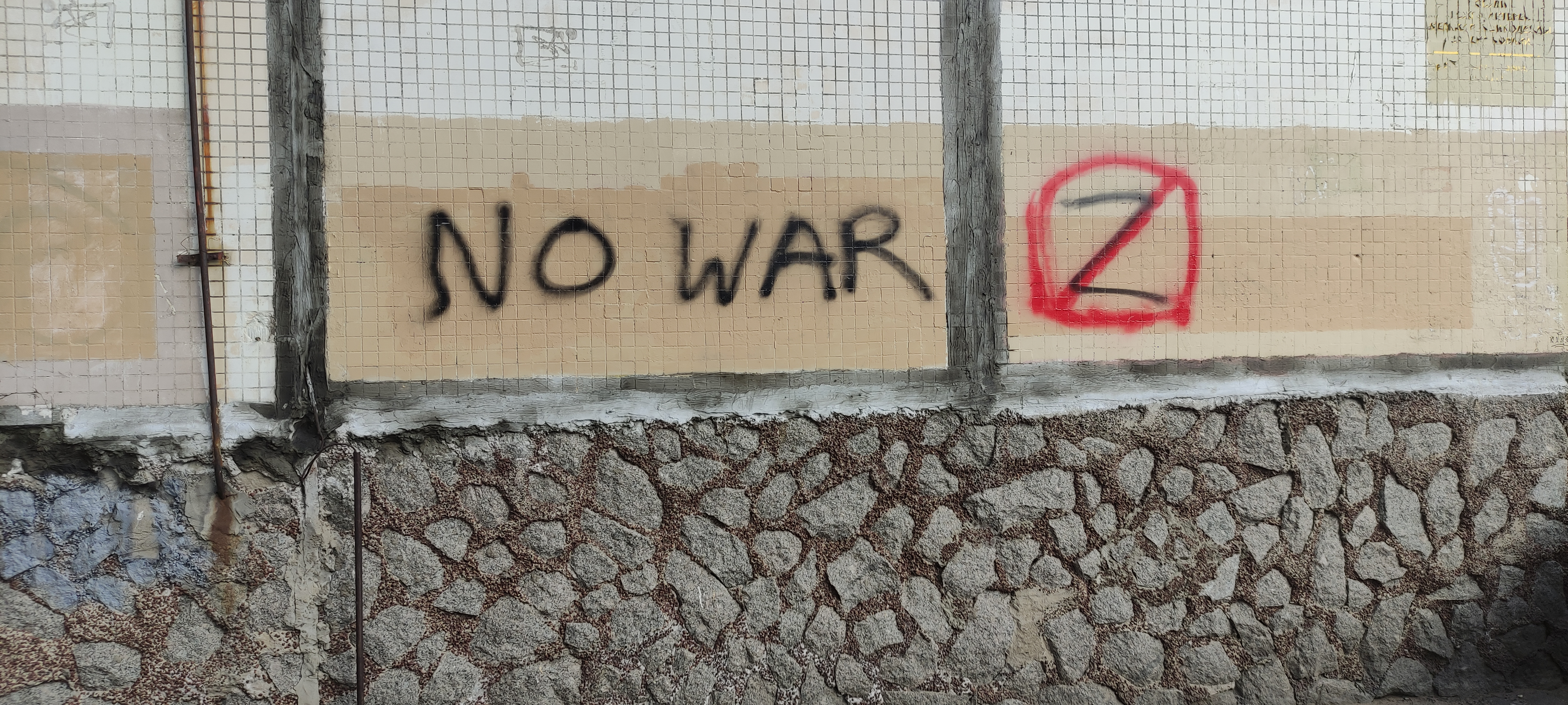
Anti-war graffiti in Saint Petersburg, Russia

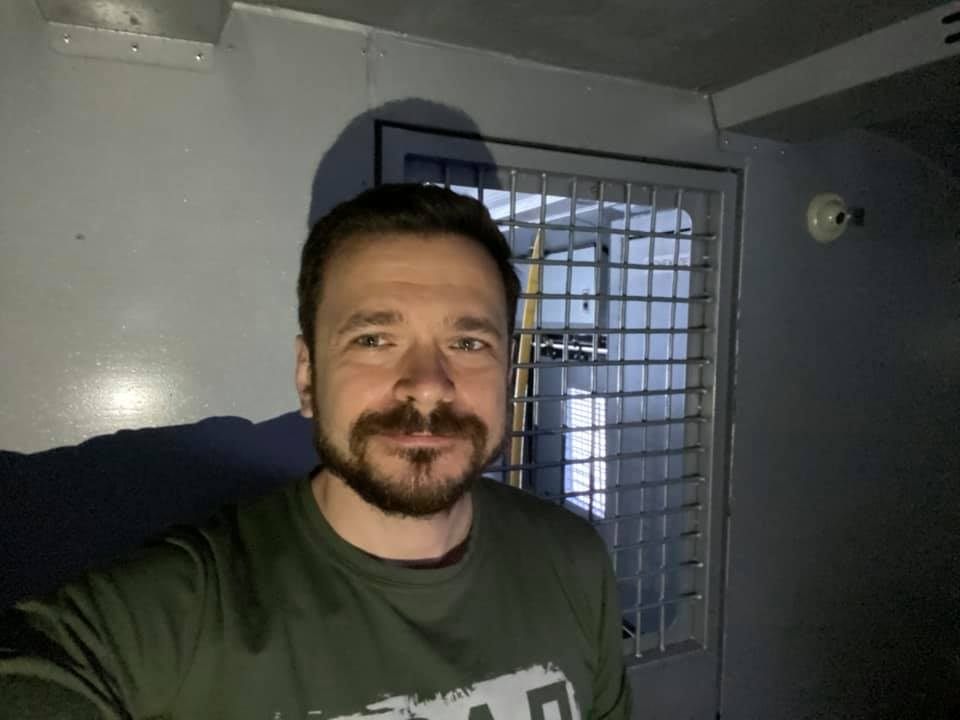
Russian opposition politician Ilya Yashin was sentenced to eight-and-a-half years in prison for discussing the Bucha massacre in Ukraine on a YouTube stream.

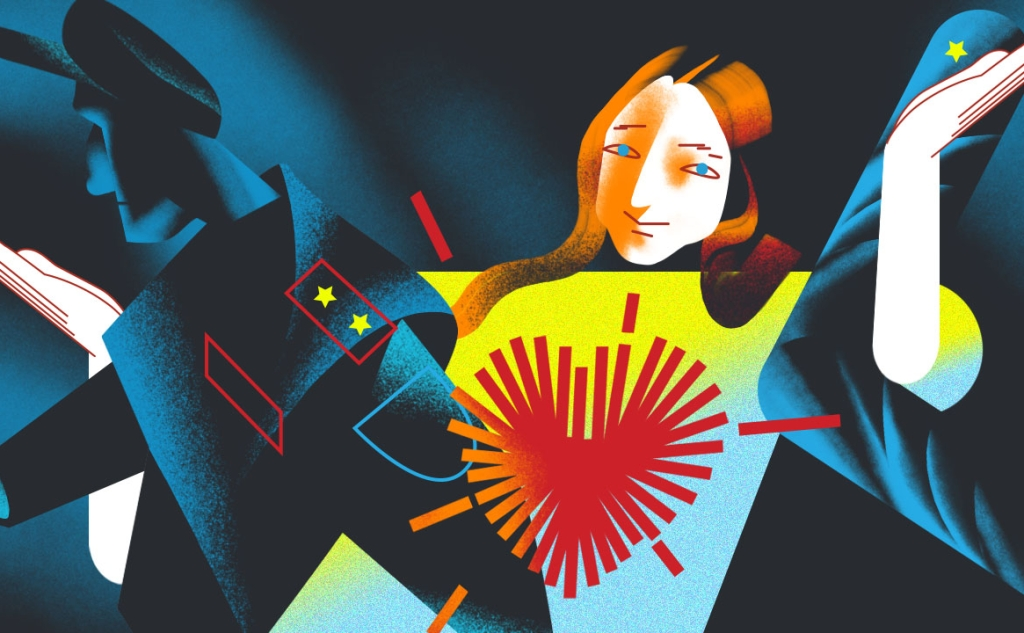
Illustration depicting Russian artist Aleksandra Skochilenko, who was arrested and later sentenced to 7 years in prison for replacing supermarket price tags with anti-war messages

Following the 2022 Russian invasion of Ukraine, protesters have used the white-blue-white flag as a symbol of opposition though not all used the flag. Several opposition activists (such as Maria Motuznaya) had criticized the justification by AssezJeune (one of the creators of the flag) to remove the red stripe.

On the afternoon of the Russian invasion of Ukraine, the Investigative Committee of Russia issued a warning to Russians that they would face legal repercussions for joining unsanctioned protests related to "the tense foreign political situation". The protests have been met with widespread repression by the Russian authorities. According to OVD-Info, at least 14,906 people were detained from 24 February to 13 March, including the largest single-day mass arrests in post-Soviet Russian history on 6 March.

In February 2022, more than 30,000 technology workers, 6,000 medical workers, 3,400 architects, more than 4,300 teachers, more than 17,000 artists, 5,000 scientists, and 2,000 actors, directors, and other creative figures signed open letters calling for Putin's government to stop the war. Some Russians who signed petitions against Russia's war in Ukraine lost their jobs.

On 17 March, Putin gave a speech in which he called opponents of the war "scum and traitors," saying that a "natural and necessary self-cleansing of society will only strengthen our country." Russian authorities were encouraging Russians to report their friends, colleagues and family members to the police for expressing opposition to the war in Ukraine.

More than 2,000 people were detained or fined by May 2022 under the laws prohibiting "fake" information about the military. In July 2022, Alexei Gorinov, a member of the Krasnoselsky district council in Moscow, was sentenced to seven years in prison after making anti-war comments at a council meeting in March. Lawyer Pavel Chikov said that this was the first jail term under the new Russian 2022 war censorship laws. According to Amnesty International, as of June 2023, up to 20,000 Russian citizens had been subject to heavy reprisals for opposing the war in Ukraine.

In October 2023, Putin's close associate Vyacheslav Volodin, Speaker of the State Duma, said that Russians who "desire the victory of the murderous Nazi Kyiv regime" should be sent to the far-eastern region of Magadan, known for its Stalin-era Gulag camps, and forced to work in the mines. In November 2023, Volodin wrote on his Telegram channel that Russians who left the country after the Russian invasion of Ukraine and are now returning "should understand that no one here is waiting for them with open arms" because they "committed treason against Russia".

=== 2022–present Russian partisan movement ===
In response to the invasion of Ukraine, numerous armed pro-democratic, and anti-authoritarian partisan and insurgent groups have sprung up within Russia in open rebellion with the aim of sabotaging the war effort and overthrowing Putin and his regime. These groups primarily engage in guerrilla warfare against the state and utilize the destruction of infrastructure such as railways, military recruitment centers, and radio towers, as well as other means to harm the state such as conducting assassinations. Some of the most notable groups involved in the conflict include the Combat Organization of Anarcho-Communists (BOAK) regarded by The Insider as "The most active 'subversive' force" within Russia since the war began, the National Republican Army, the Freedom of Russia Legion, and the far-right Russian Volunteer Corps.

=== 2023 Wagner rebellion ===
On June 23, 2023, forces loyal to Yevgeny Prigozhin's Wagner Group began a mutiny against the Russian government. The group justified their revolt by citing the Russian Ministry of Defence's mishandling of the 2022 Russian invasion of Ukraine (namely blaming Sergei Shoigu, the Russian Minister of Defense), as well as claiming the Russian army shelled one of the Wagner group's barracks, resulting in casualties. Wagner occupied the city of Rostov-on-Don, surrounding and then seizing the headquarters of the Southern Military District. Prigozhin vowed to march on Moscow and arrest Shoigu, and other Russian generals, and put them on trial for murder of Wagner personnel.

There were no sizeable spontaneous displays of public support for the Putin government during the rebellion. The Russian population displayed a predominantly "silent" and apathetic reaction. Russia analyst Anna Matveeva contrasted the Russian public's response to that of the Turkish public during the 2016 Turkish coup d'état attempt, where numerous Turkish citizens actively participated in anti-coup demonstrations.

=== 2024 Russian presidential election ===
Putin was due to have to stand down as president in 2024 due to term limits in Russia's constitution, but it was widely expected that he would attempt to stay in power through certain means such as changing the constitution, even though Putin claimed otherwise in 2018. As predicted, Putin announced that constitutional changes would be proposed allowing him to stay in power until 2036 by "resetting" his terms, widely criticised by opponents, and these changes were then 'approved' in a disputed referendum in which independent election monitors received hundreds of reports of violations and state employees were deliberately prompted to vote in favour. Leader of the opposition Alexei Navalny dismissed the legitimacy of the poll and denounced the changes, saying that they would make Putin "president for life".

Journalist Yekaterina Duntsova tried to run in the 2024 election on a platform opposing the war in Ukraine, commenting: "Any sane person taking this step would be afraid – but fear must not win". However, she was quickly barred from running by the Central Election Commission, which claimed that she had made '100 mistakes' such as spelling errors on her forms and so should be denied registration. The BBC reported on Dunstova's rejection that: "the immediate slap-down of a Putin critic will be seen as evidence by some that no dissent will be tolerated in the campaign". The nationalist and previously pro-Putin Igor Girkin, who also attempted to become a candidate, openly declared that the election was a "sham", stating that "the only winner is known in advance" and "I understand perfectly well that in the current situation in Russia, participating in the presidential campaign is like sitting down at a table to play with card sharps". Girkin, a former FSB agent, was later sentenced to four years imprisonment.

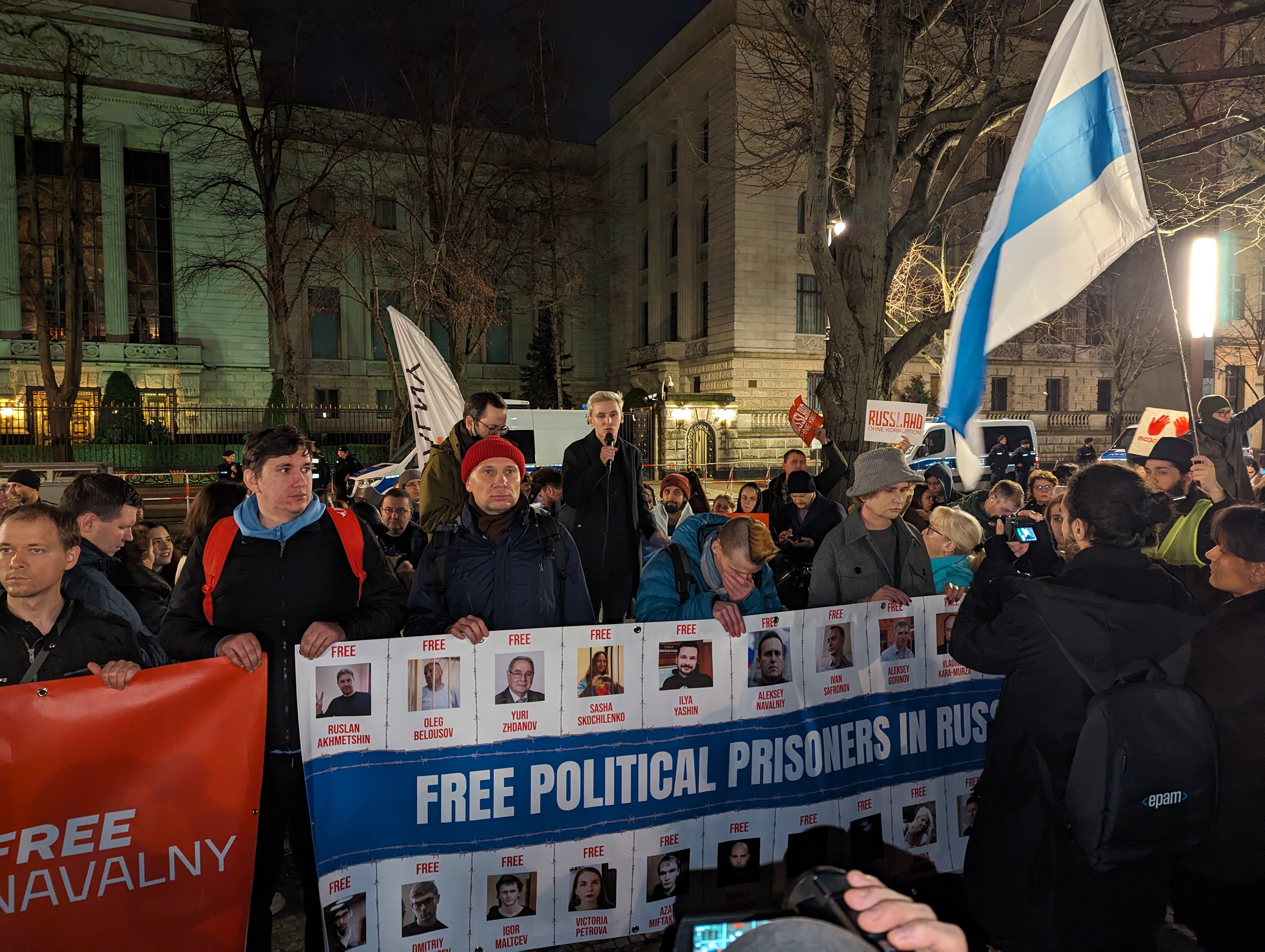
Protest outside the Russian Embassy in Berlin demanding the release of political prisoners in Russia, February 2024

Boris Nadezhdin declared his intention to run on a platform of opposing Putin and the Ukraine war. He quickly gained support, and queues formed in towns and villages across Russia and outside Boris Nadezhdin's headquarters in Moscow to sign their name in support of his bid for presidency. Footage showed how many thousands had queued even in the snow to sign their names, and he garnered "surprise levels of support", especially from younger urban Russians. The number of Russians who had turned up to sign their names was so unexpectedly high that extra sign-up centres had to be added in Moscow. In what was described as something "seemingly unachievable in Russian politics", Nadezhdin managed to unify many prominent opposition politicians and public figures behind his campaign and gained their endorsements: Yekaterina Duntsova (who had previously been barred), Mikhail Khodorkovsky, Ekaterina Schulmann, Yulia Navalnaya (wife of Alexei Navalny), Ilya Varlamov, Lyubov Sobol and many others. Russia's main opposition leader Navalny also passed a message from his imprisonment giving his backing to Nadezhdin's campaign. Navalny had himself been barred from the previous Russian presidential election in 2018 on what is widely seen as political grounds.

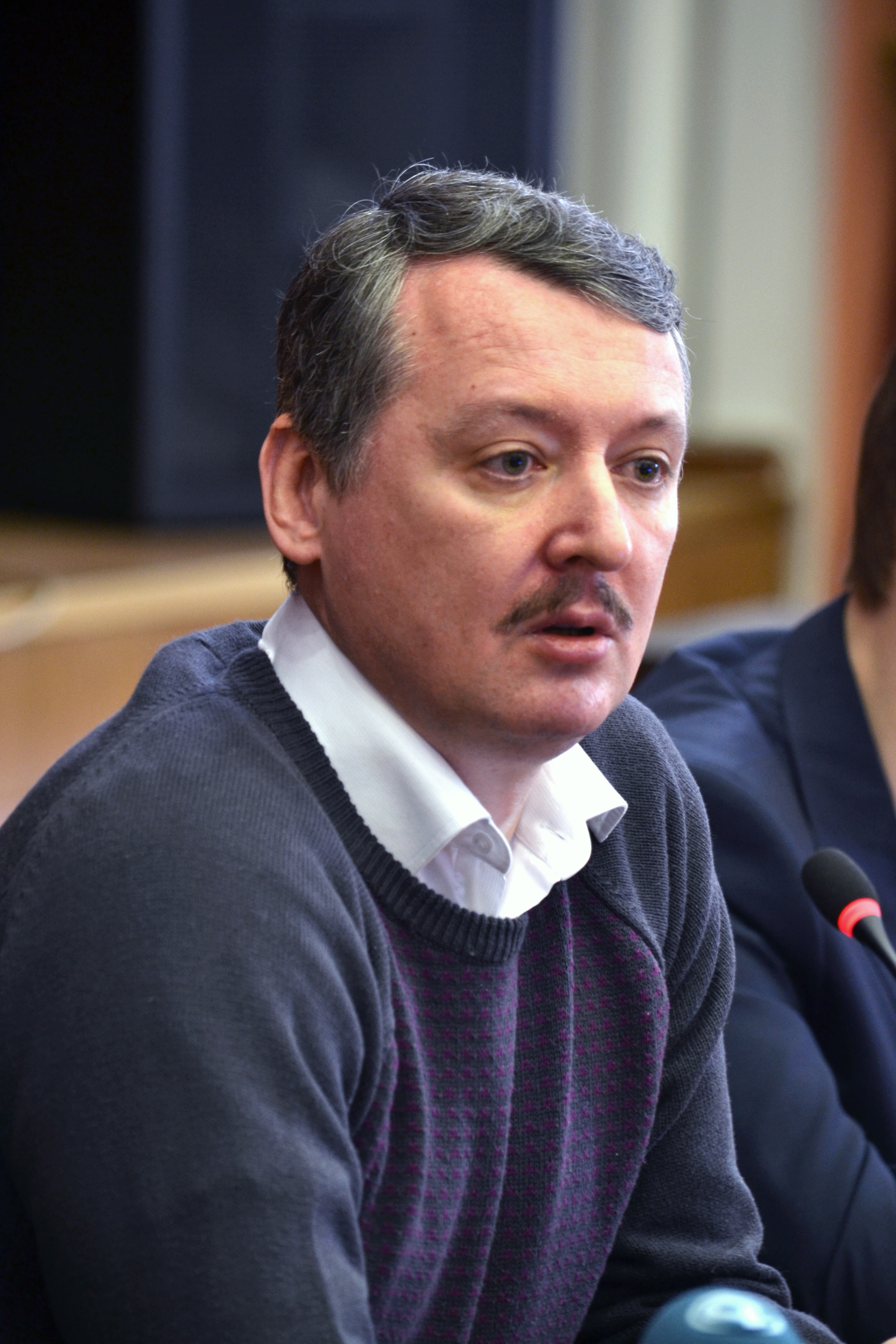
The nationalist and pro-war former FSB agent Igor Girkin openly declared that the upcoming 2024 presidential election was a "sham" and "the only winner is known in advance". He was subsequently imprisoned for insulting Putin and not allowed to run.

Multiple sources, including from inside the Kremlin, stated that the Kremlin would likely seek to deny Nadezhdin a place on the ballot. The CEC regularly uses the process of having to collect signatures to refuse to register would-be opposition candidates, acting as a form of filter to stop unwanted developments for the Kremlin. On 30 January 2024, Kremlin propagandist and television presenter Vladimir Solovyov warned Nadezhdin: "I feel bad for Boris. The fool didn’t realize that he’s not being set up to run for president but for a criminal case on charges of betraying the Motherland."

As predicted, on 8 February 2024 Nadezhdin was barred from running due to alleged "irregularities" in the signatures of voters supporting his candidacy. The election commission claimed that only 95,587 of his signatures in support of his candidacy were valid, just short of the 100,000 needed to run. His team said that some of the "errors" the election commission had claimed existed were merely minor typos that happened when handwritten names were put into its computers. Nadezhdin published evidence of this, showing Mayakovsky Street typed up as 'Myakovsky Street', the city of Salekhard misspelled as 'Salikhard', and one address in Rostov-on-Don typed up as 'Rostov-on-Dom'. Nadezhdin explained that the commission then used this to reject these signatures on the grounds that the address of these people "did not match". The commission also dubiously claimed that there were eleven dead people on Nadezhdin's list of signatures and that this disqualified his entire list of 105,000 signatures – which was in fact more than the 100,000 required to run. The press contacted the man whose address had been incorrectly entered as 'Rostov-on-Dom', and he confirmed he had indeed added his signature in support of Nadezhdin's candidacy, saying "this constitutes election obstruction".

==== Suspicious death of Navalny ====
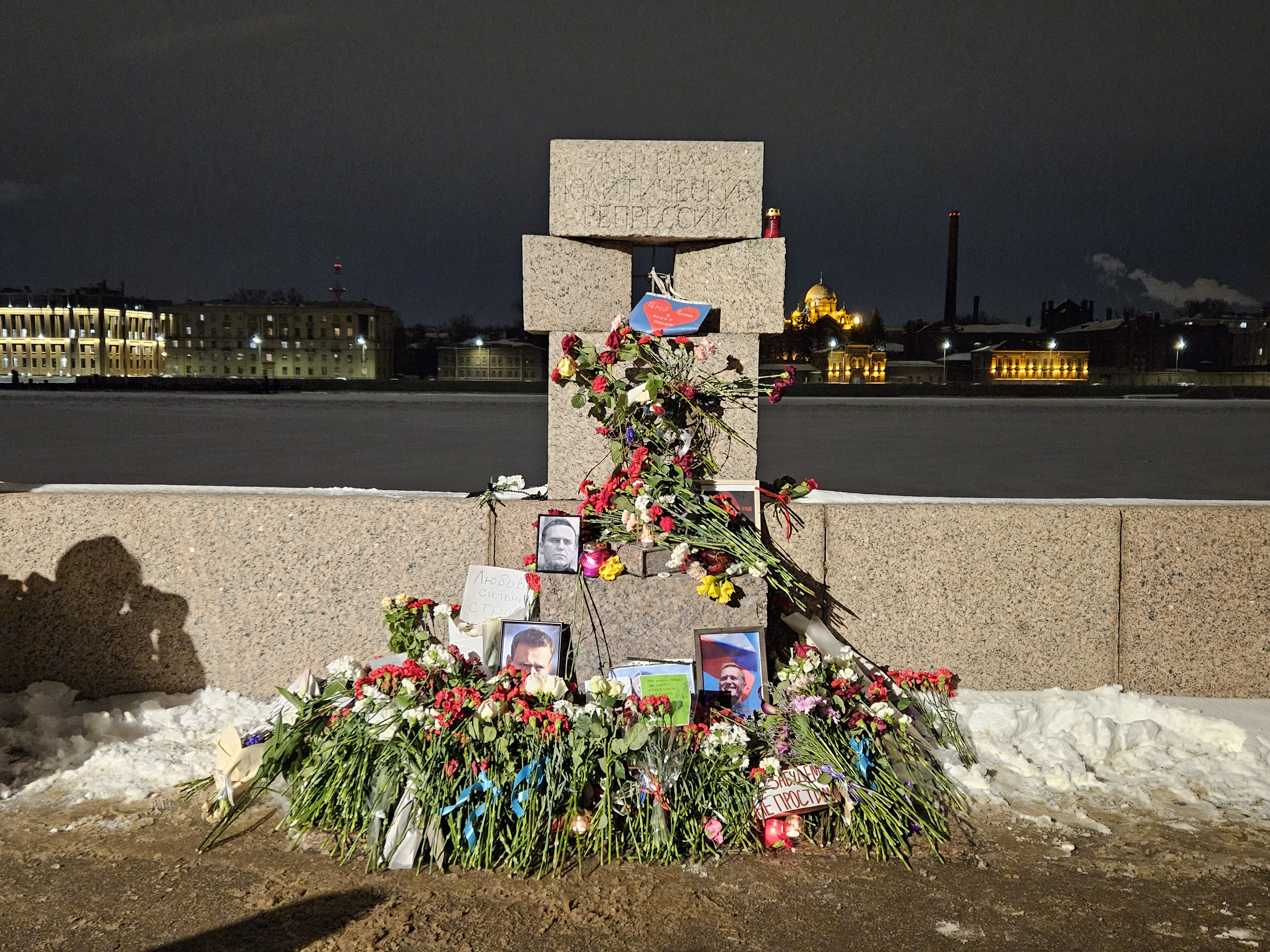
Action in memory of Alexei Navalny at the monument to victims of political repression in St. Petersburg on 16 February 2024

As well as endorsing Nadezhdin, Alexei Navalny and his allies had called on supporters to protest Putin during the third day of the presidential election by all going to vote against him at the same time. Navalny then died in suspicious circumstances in his harsh imprisonment at a prison colony in the Arctic Circle, aged only 47, on 16 February 2024. After his death, Russians began bringing flowers to monuments to victims of political repression in cities across the country. People laid flowers at Moscow's Solovetsky Stone and the Wall of Grief. The Moscow Prosecutor's Office warned Russians against mass protests. Hundreds of people across more than 30 Russian cities were detained by police merely for attending makeshift memorials to Navalny.

The authorities further aroused suspicion by refusing to release Navalny's body to his family for over a week after his death, with his wife stating that his body was being kept until traces of intentional poisoning by Novichok had disappeared. He had previously been poisoned with Novichok by the Russian secret services in 2020, which had only been discovered at the time as an emergency evacuation had been arranged to the specialist Charité hospital in Berlin, which then carried out the tests which identified the poison. Navalny's mother attempted to go to the prison colony he died in to collect Navalny's body, but was repeatedly obstructed from doing so and instead sent to a morgue where his body had never been taken, and not told where his body was. She was then reportedly threatened to agree to a 'secret' burial of Navalny, or else he would be buried at the prison, being given only three hours to agree to the ultimatum. She refused to negotiate and demanded authorities complied with the law obliging investigators to hand over the body within two days of determining the causes of death. Navalny's wife was then forced to sign a death certificate claiming he had died of natural causes, with authorities claiming he had collapsed and died of "sudden death syndrome". Such a scenario is deemed to be suspicious due to multiple other 'sudden deaths' of those who have criticised Putin, such as Ravil Maganov and Yevgeny Prigozhin. Independent analysts also reject the authorities' medical explanations for his death. More than 50,000 Russians sent requests to the Russian government demanding that they return his body to his family.

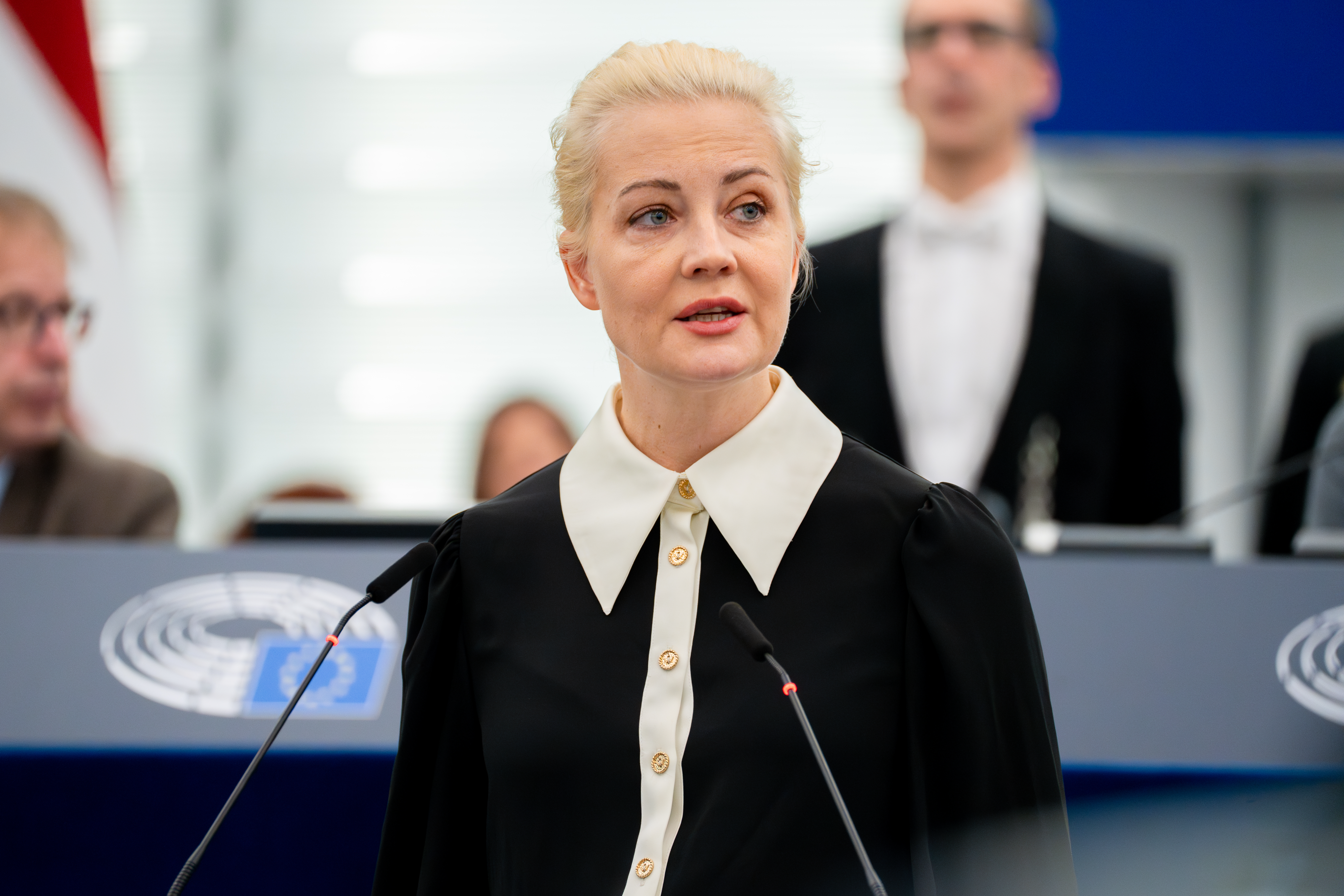
After main opposition leader Alexei Navalny suspiciously died in February 2024, his widow Yulia Navalnaya pledged to continue his work, asking Russians to "stand beside me".

The authorities belatedly returned Navalny's body eight days after his death, and upon his burial on Moscow thousands defied likely repression to appear in the streets to chant his name and their opposition to Putin. 250,000 people also watched a livestream of his funeral provided by his team, despite apparent attempts by the authorities to interrupt internet coverage. The crowds who attended chanted "no to war", "Russia without Putin" and "Russia will be free", even though there was a noticeable police presence. The funeral ceremony was also attended by Boris Nadezhdin and Yekaterina Duntsova, the two opposition candidates who had been barred from running against Putin in the presidential election, with Nadezhdin stating: "We have come to say goodbye to a person who was a symbol of an era. There is still hope that everything will be all right and Russia will be free and peaceful as Alexei had dreamed".

There was widespread international condemnation of Russian authorities for Navalny's death. US President Joe Biden commented "there is no doubt that the death of Mr Navalny was a consequence of something Putin and his thugs did", whilst French president Emmanuel Macron remarked on his "anger and indignation", adding: "in today's Russia, free spirits are put in the gulag and sentenced to death". Germany's government called for the release of political prisoners in Russia, with a spokesman commenting: "It is shocking that people are being arrested in Russia for laying flowers in honour of Alexei Navalny's death".

==== 2024 Noon against Putin ====
After Navalny's death his wife Yulia Navalnaya said that she would continue his work, asking Russians to "stand beside me" and "share the fury and hate for those who dared to kill our future". She appeared before the European Parliament on 28 February 2024 and was given a standing ovation for her emotional speech, in which she stated that defeating Putin requires innovation instead of only applying sanctions and resolutions against his regime. In March, she reiterated Navalny's request for Russians to protest at the presidential election by all turning up and forming long queues at polling stations at midday on 17 March, since it was a protest action that could show the strength of anti-Putin sentiment without the authorities being able to prevent it or arrest people for it.

== Opposition figures ==
- Zhanna Agalakova
- Liya Akhedzhakova
- Malik Akhmedilov* †
- Georgy Alburov
- Lyudmila Alexeyeva* (Note: Died in 2018)
- Maria Alyokhina
- Maximilian Andronnikov, a.k.a. "Caesar"*
- Vladimir Ashurkov
- Ilya Azar
- Farid Babayev*†
- Anastasia Baburova* †
- Mikhail Beketov* †
- Nikita Belykh* (Note: Since 2018 has been imprisoned)
- Boris Berezovsky* † (Note: In exile since 2000, subject to an Interpol Red Notice by the Russian government, found dead in mysterious circumstances in 2013)
- Darya Besedina
- Nikolai Bondarenko
- Dmitry Bykov* (Note: Survived a suspected poisoning in 2019)
- Yuriy Chervochkin* †
- Alexei Devotchenko* †
- Roman Dobrokhotov* (Note: In exile since 2021, warrant for his arrest issued by Russian government)
- Yury Dud* (Note: In exile since 2022, designated a "foreign agent" by the Russian government)
- Yekaterina Duntsova
- Natalya Estemirova* †
- Tatyana Felgenhauer* (Note: Survived an attempted murder in 2017, currently in exile)
- Sergei Furgal* (Note: Since 2020 has been imprisoned)
- Maria Gaidar* (Note: Currently lives abroad)
- Yegor Gaidar* (Note: Survived a poisoning in 2006, died unexpectedly at 53 in 2009) †
- Maxim Galkin* (Note: In exile since 2022, designated a "foreign agent" by the Russian government)
- Alexey Gaskarov
- Igor Girkin* (Note: Sentenced to four years imprisonment in a penal colony in 2024 for insulting Putin)
- Nikolai Glushkov* †
- Alexei Gorinov* (Note: Sentenced to seven years' imprisonment in 2022 for objecting to the 2022 Russian Invasion of Ukraine)
- Dmitry Gudkov* (Note: Currently in exile)
- Gennady Gudkov*
- Andrey Illarionov*
- Boris Kagarlitsky* (Note: imprisoned since 2023)
- Marina Kalashnikova* (Note: Survived a mercury poisoning with her husband in exile in 2010)
- Viktor Kalashnikov* (Note: Survived a mercury poisoning with his wife in exile in 2010)
- Denis Kapustin, a.k.a. "White Rex"*
- Evgenia Kara-Murza*
- Vladimir Kara-Murza* (Note: Survived poisoning by FSB agents in 2015 and 2017, imprisoned since 2022)
- Nadezhda Karpova* (Note: Currently lives abroad)
- Garry Kasparov*
- Mikhail Kasyanov* (Note: In exile since 2022)
- Maxim Katz
- Irina Khakamada
- Mikhail Khodorkovsky*
- Pavel Khodorkovsky*
- Andrei Kozyrev*
- Nina L. Khrushcheva*
- Timur Kuashev* †
- Maxim Kuzminov †
- Yulia Latynina* (Note: Fled Russia in 2017 after numerous attacks and threats against her)
- Alexander Litvinenko* †
- Marina Litvinenko
- Mikhail Lobanov
- Ravil Maganov* †
- Isabel Magkoeva
- Sergei Magnitsky* †
- Mikhail Matveyev
- Stanislav Markelov* †
- Boris Mints* (Note: Currently in exile, arrest warrant issued by the Russian government)
- Sergey Mitrokhin
- Sergey Mokhnatkin* †
- Karinna Moskalenko* (Note: Survived a mercury poisoning in 2008)
- Dmitry Muratov
- Boris Nadezhdin
- Yulia Navalnaya
- Alexei Navalny* †
- Boris Nemtsov* †
- Zhanna Nemtsova* (Note: Currently in exile)
- Valeriya Novodvorskaya* †
- Oleg Orlov* (Note: Was imprisoned since 2024 until international prisoners' swap)
- Marina Ovsyannikova* (Note: In exile since 2023, sentenced to 8.5 years imprisonment in absentia for "spreading knowingly false information")
- Miron Fyodorov* (Note: Designated a "foreign agent" by the Russian government)
- Leonid Parfyonov
- Gleb Pavlovsky* (Note: Died in 2023)
- Alexander Perepilichny* † (Note: Died in suspicious circumstances aged 34 in 2012)
- Dmitry Petrov* †
- Nikolay Platoshkin* (Note: Issued a five-year suspended prison sentence in 2021)
- Anna Politkovskaya* †
- Ilya Ponomarev*
- Lev Ponomaryov
- Yevgeny Prigozhin* †
- Mikhail Prokhorov* (Note: Currently lives abroad)
- Valery Rashkin
- Yevgeny Roizman* (Note: Since 2022 has been imprisoned)
- Ivan Rybkin* (Note: Survived a kidnapping in 2004)
- Vladimir Ryzhkov
- Yekaterina Samutsevich
- Ekaterina Schulmann* (Note: Currently in exile, designated a "foreign agent" by the Russian government)
- Viktor Shenderovich* (Note: In exile since 2022)
- Yuri Shevchuk
- Lilia Shevtsova
- Lev Shlosberg
- Ruslan Shaveddinov* (Note: Designated a "foreign agent" by the Russian government, warrant for his arrest also issued)
- Yuri Shchekochikhin* †
- Yury Shutov* †
- Natalya Sindeyeva
- Aleksandra Skochilenko* (Note: Sentenced to seven years imprisonment in 2023 for replacing five price tags in a local supermarket with notes criticising the 2022 Russian invasion of Ukraine)
- Emilia Slabunova
- Irina Slavina* †
- Olga Smirnova* (Note: In exile since 2022)
- Fyodor Smolov
- Ksenia Sobchak
- Lyubov Sobol* (Note: Currently in exile, warrant for her arrest issued by Russian government)
- Mikhail Svetov*
- Vladimir Sviridov* †
- Pavel Talankin (Note: Currently in exile)
- Nadya Tolokonnikova
- Sergei Tretyakov* †
- Anastasia Udaltsova
- Sergei Udaltsov
- Yevgeny Urlashov* (Note: Imprisoned since 2017)
- Denis Voronenkov* †
- Alexei Venediktov* (Note: Labelled a "foreign agent" by the Russian Government in 2022)
- Pyotr Verzilov* (Note: Survived a poisoning in 2017)
- Kira Yarmysh*
- Ilya Yashin* (Note: Currently in exile)
- Grigory Yavlinsky
- Magomed Yevloyev* †
- Sergei Yushenkov* †
- Akhmed Zakayev*
- Ivan Zhdanov*
- Gennady Zyuganov

== Opposition leadership ==
=== Non-systemic opposition leaders ===
| Year | Leader | Political party | Event/Election | Position |
|---|---|---|---|---|
| 2000–2015 † | Boris Nemtsov | People's Freedom Party | "Save NTV" protests, 2004–2005 Russian benefits monetization protests, Dissenters' March, Strategy-31, 2011–2013 Russian protests, 2014 anti-war protests in Russia | Deputy Chairman of the State Duma (2000), Leader of the Union of Right Forces parliamentary group (2000–2003), Member of the Russian Opposition Coordination Council (2012–2013), Member of the Russian regional parliament of the Yaroslavl Oblast (2013–2015) |
| 2015–2024 † | Alexei Navalny | Russia of the Future | 2017–2018 Russian protests, 2019 Moscow protests, 2020 Russian protests, 2021 Navalny Protests, Anti-war protests in Russia (2022-present) | Member and leading figure of the Russian Opposition Coordination Council (2012–2013), would-be presidential candidate in the 2018 election |
| 2024–present | Without defined leadership (Yulia Navalnaya in exile) | | 2024 Russian presidential election, Noon against Putin | Alexei Navalny's wife |

=== Systemic opposition leaders ===
| Year | Leader | Political party | Event/Election | Position |
|---|---|---|---|---|
| 2000–present | Gennady Zyuganov | Communist Party of the Russian Federation | 2000 presidential election, 2003 legislative election, 2007 legislative election, 2008 presidential election, 2011 legislative election, 2012 presidential election, 2016 legislative election, 2021 legislative election | Member of the State Duma (1994–present) |

White ribbon was used as an opposition symbol during the 2011–2013 Russian protests, also known as the "Snow Revolution".

Flag of Russia from 1991 to 1993, with light blue stripe on the flag

Music sheet of Patrioticheskaya Pesnya, Russian national anthem from 1991 to 2000

== Symbols ==
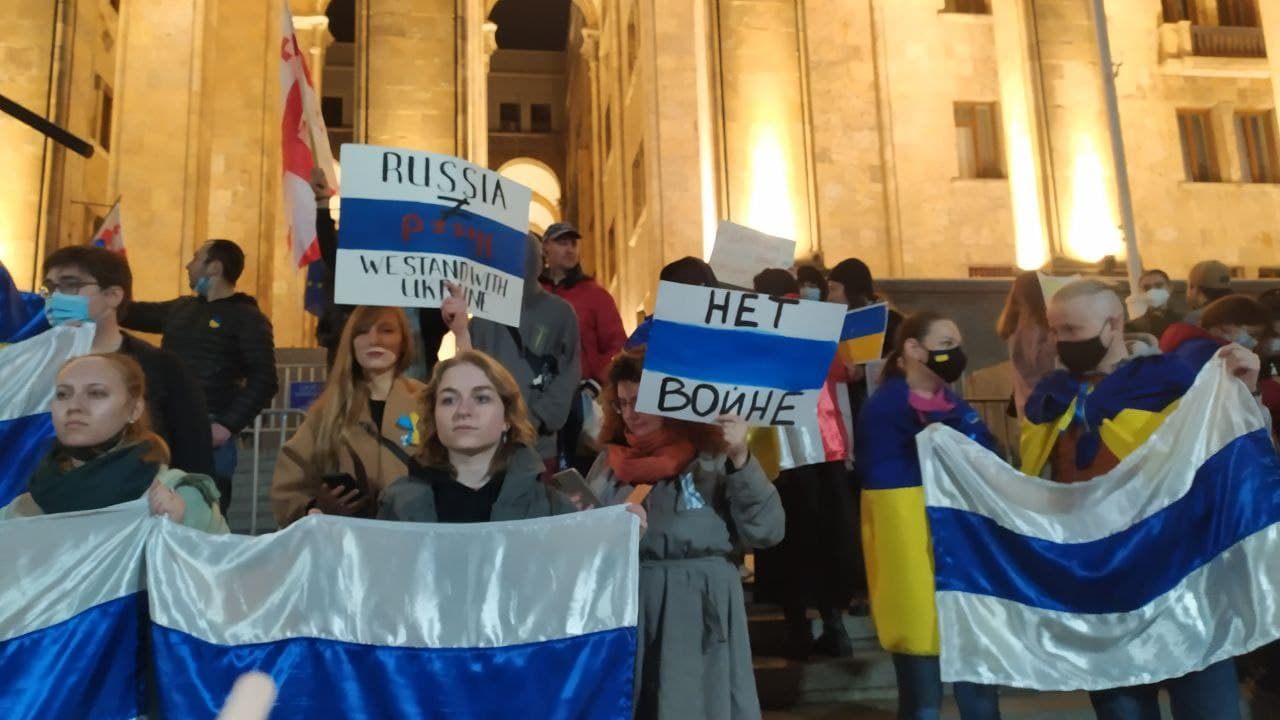
Russians protest against the war in Ukraine with the white-blue-white Russian flag, on 2 March 2022

In 2012, the term white ribbon opposition was applied to the protesters for fair elections as they wore white ribbons as their symbol.

The white-blue-white flag is a symbol of opposition to the 2022 Russian invasion of Ukraine that has been used by Russian anti-war protesters. It has also been used as a symbol of opposition to the current government of Russia. The flag was not used by many Russian anti-war protesters (especially those inside Russia) as they usually fly the current white-blue-red flag.

During the Wagner Group rebellion, forces loyal to the Wagner group painted a red Z on the side of their vehicles, in reference to the white Z used by Russian forces during the invasion of Ukraine.

Other opposition groups use the Russian flag with a light blue center stripe, which was used from 1991 to 1993 (during the so-called August Republic, the clearest period of Russian democracy between the failed 1991 Soviet coup attempt and the 1993 constitutional crisis) and Patrioticheskaya Pesnya (The Patriotic Song), a national anthem of the Russian Federation from 1991 to 2000. There were also rare occasions of using the white bear as a symbol of democracy, while the brown bear represented dictatorship.

== In culture ==
=== Books ===
- 12 Who Don't Agree (2009), non-fiction book by Valery Panyushkin
- Winter is Coming (2015), non-fiction book by former Russian chess grandmaster Garry Kasparov

=== Films ===
- Les Enfants terribles de Vladimir Vladimirovitch Poutine (2006)
- This is Our City (2007), by Alexander Shcherbanosov
- The Revolution That Wasn't (2008), by Alyona Polunina
- Nemtsov
- My Friend Boris Nemtsov (2016)
- Term (2018), by Alexander Rastorguyev
- Putin's Palace: History of the World's Largest Bribe (2021), by Alexei Navalny
- Navalny (2022), by Daniel Roher
- Mr Nobody Against Putin (2025), by David Borenstein and Pavel Talankin

== See also ==
- Assassination of Boris Nemtsov
- Belarusian opposition
- Bill Browder
- Iranian opposition
- Cuban dissident movement
- Democracy movements of China
- Dissenters' March
- Kazakh opposition
- Venezuelan opposition
- Kirill Serebrennikov
- National Endowment for Democracy
- Non-system opposition
- Political groups under Vladimir Putin's presidency
- Putin khuylo!
- Reaction of Russian intelligentsia to the 2014 annexation of Crimea
- Russia under Vladimir Putin
- Russia will be free
- Russian partisan movement (2022–present)
- Soviet dissidents
- Transnational repression by Russia
- Anthem of Free Russia
