= Mineralovodsky =

Mineralovodsky (masculine), Mineralovodskaya (feminine), or Mineralovodskoye (neuter) may refer to:

- Mineralovodsky District, a district of Stavropol Krai, Russia
- Mineralovodsky Urban Okrug, a municipal formation in Stavropol Krai, Russia into which the town of krai significance of Mineralnye Vody and Mineralovodsky District are incorporated
