= Vladimir Sviridov (army officer) =

- Владимир Георгиевич Свиридов
- Born: Vladimir Georgyevich Sviridov; 13 October 1955; Mineralnye Vody, Russian SFSR, Soviet Union
- Died: November 2023; Andzhiyevsky, Russia
- Military career
- Allegiance: Soviet Union; Russia
- Service years: 1974–2009
- Rank: Lieutenant General

Vladimir Georgyevich Sviridov (Russian: Владимир Георгиевич Свиридов; 13 October 1955 – November 2023) was a Russian army officer and the former Commander of the 6th Air and Air Defence Forces Army serving from 2005 to 2009, and was a Lieutenant General of Aviation.

In November 2023, Svirodov was found dead with his wife and is part of the suspicious deaths during the Russian invasion of Ukraine.

== Biography ==
Vladimir Sviridov was born on 13 October 1955 in the city of Mineralnye Vody, Stavropol Krai. In 1975, he entered and in 1979 graduated from the Stavropol Higher Military Aviation School of Air Defense Pilots and Navigators. He continued his service as a pilot, senior pilot, aviation flight commander in the Far Eastern Military District, aviation flight commander, deputy squadron commander, and aviation squadron commander in the Group of Soviet Forces in Germany.

In 1992 Sviridov graduated from the Gagarin Air Force Academy. He served in the following positions: deputy commander of a bomber aviation regiment for flight training in the Transcaucasian and North Caucasus Military Districts (SKVO), commander of a bomber aviation regiment, deputy commander of a bomber division in the North Caucasus Military District, commander of a bomber aviation division in the Far Eastern Military District. In 2002, he graduated from the Military Academy of the General Staff of the Armed Forces of Russia. He was then appointed deputy commander of an army of the Air Force and Air Defence Forces.

On 6 June 2005, by Decree of the President of the Russia, Sviridov was appointed commander of the 6th Air and Air Defence Forces Army. In 2007, in his interview with the Russian magazine Take Off that pilots were receiving inadequate training, Sviridov complained, "A pilot must have about 100 hours of flight time per year for full combat readiness. However, this is not yet the case. The average flight time in the army is currently 25-30 hours." In another interview, he criticized the too low level of training of officers. "It is, however, very popular in Russia," he said.

Sviridov received the Order of the Red Star, the "For Military Merit medal", and the title of "Honored Military Pilot of Russia" during his career.

In December 2009, at age 54, he was fired due to his harsh criticisms, and had retired as a lieutenant general as of 2009.

== Death ==
On 16 November 2023, Svirirdov was found dead in his home in Andzhiyevsky, in Stavropol Krai, at the age of 68, along with his wife, Tatyana, aged 72.

According to initial investigations, they had been dead for around a week; according to the Russian news agency RIA Novosti, there was "no trace of violent death". A malfunction in the heating system following a power outage caused their carbon monoxide poisoning. However, on-site measurements did not reveal any carbon monoxide concentration limits being exceeded.

They had two children.
