= Andzhiyevsky =

Andzhiyevsky Анджиевский
- Work settlement
- Interactive map of Andzhiyevsky
- Location of Andzhiyevsky Andzhiyevsky (Stavropol Krai)
- Coordinates: 44°14′08″N 43°05′30″E
- Country: Russia
- Federal subject: Stavropol Krai
- Founded: 1929
- Elevation: 306 m (1,004 ft)

Population (2010 Census)
  - Total: 6,680
  - Estimate (2025): 5,943 (−11%)

Administrative status
  - Subordinated to: town of krai significance of Mineralnye Vody

Municipal status
  - Urban okrug: Mineralovodsky Urban Okrug
- Time zone: UTC+3 (MSK)
- Postal code: 357217
- OKTMO ID: 07721000056

Andzhiyevsky (Russian: Анджиевский) is an urban locality (urban-type settlement) under the administrative jurisdiction of the town of krai significance of Mineralnye Vody of Stavropol Krai, Russia. Population: 6,680 (2010 census); 6,636 (2002 census); 5,317 (1989 Soviet census).
