= True Russia =

Russian opposition humanitarian-cultural political project

True Russia Настоящая Россия
- Abbreviation: tr
- Leader: Boris Akunin
- Managing director: Oleg Radzinsky
- Founders: Mikhail Baryshnikov; Sergey Guriyev
- Founded: 9 March 2022
- Ideology: Liberal democracy Pacifism; Anti-Putinism
- Political position: Big tent
- Colours: Blue; Black
- Slogan: «Anti-war, pro-democracy» (Russian: «Против войны, за демократию»)

Website
- truerussia.org

True Russia (Russian: Настоящая Россия, romanized: Nastoyashchaya Rossiya) is a charity opposed to 2022 Russian invasion of Ukraine by uniting people of Russian culture around the world in their will to support the victims. It was founded by writer Boris Akunin, dancer Mikhail Baryshnikov and economist Sergey Guriyev. The project is dedicated to helping Ukrainian refugees, as well as people who were forced to leave Russia after the Russian invasion of Ukraine. The project's website emphasizes that it is not a political movement and not affiliated with any party or politician.

== History ==
The project was organized on 9 March 2022, when fundraising began to help Ukrainian refugees.

On 17 March, in an interview with the BBC, Akunin said that the project is primarily focused on the Russian diaspora, on the people, and that participation in any pacifist and even more so pro-Ukrainian campaigns now poses a certain risk for Russians living in Russia.

After Akunin announced his anti-war position, stores in Russia began to withdraw his book from sale.

On 24 May, the project website was blocked by Roskomnadzor by decision of the Prosecutor-General's Office of the Russian Federation.

In July, it was reported that the organization had raised more than £1 million to help refugees.

In December 2023, the project was designated as an "undesirable organization", having previously been labeled a "foreign agent".
