= 2020 Russian protests =

2020 demonstrations against Vladimir Putin in Russia

- Part of the Russian opposition protest rallies
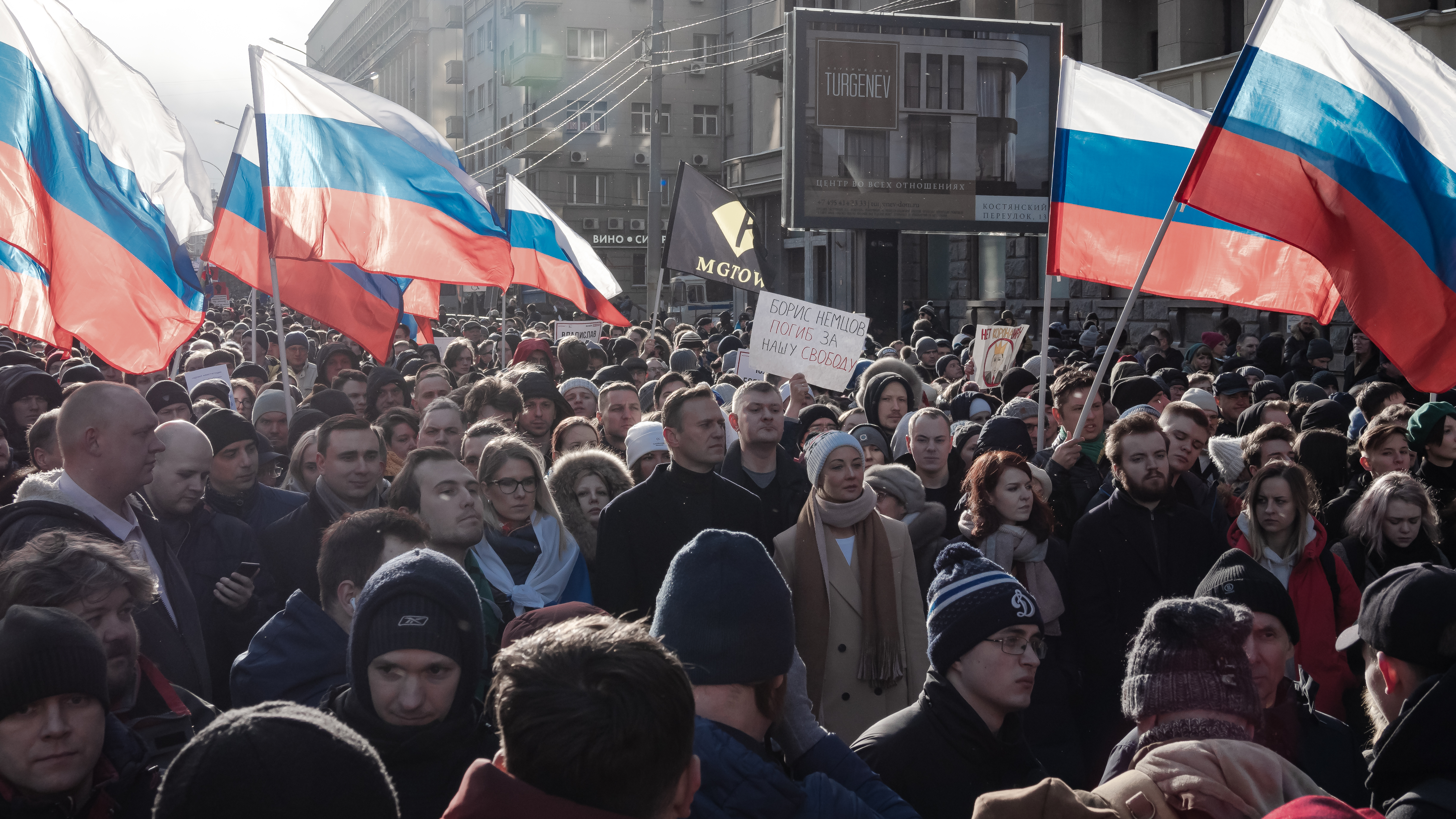
- Opposition leader Alexei Navalny taking part in a rally in memory of the murdered former Deputy Prime Minister Boris Nemtsov on 29 February in Moscow
- Date: February 27, 2020 – October 2020
- Location: Various cities and towns across Russia, including Moscow, Saint Petersburg and Yekaterinburg
- Caused by: Authoritarianism and lack of civil liberties; Corruption; Discontent with Vladimir Putin and his ruling party; 2020 Russian constitutional referendum; Poisoning of Alexei Navalny; Arrest of Khabarovsk Krai Governor Sergei Furgal; COVID-19 pandemic mismanagement
- Goals: Resignation of Vladimir Putin and Prime Minister Mikhail Mishustin; Democratization; Repeal the 2020 Russian constitutional amendments; Support for Alexei Navalny and the Russian opposition
- Result: Protester demands not met; Navalny poisoned with Novichok, forced to leave Russia for medical treatment, and arrested after the return in January 2021; Protests merged into 2021 Russian protests; Increased autocratization of Russia

Parties
(Russia) Russian opposition: Anti-Corruption Foundation; Russia of the Future; People's Freedom Party; Solidarnost; Yabloko; Furgal's supporters; Bashkir protesters	Government of Russia; National Guard; National Guard Forces Command; OMON; SOBR; Ministry of Internal Affairs; Police; Cossacks; United Russia

Lead figures
Alexei Navalny; Leonid Volkov; Ilya Yashin; Grigory Yavlinsky; Sergei Furgal; Fail Alsynov	Vladimir Putin (Russia) Mikhail Mishustin; Sergey Sobyanin; Radiy Khabirov

Number
On 29 February: around 23,000 protesters	

The 2020 Russian protests were a continuation of the previous demonstrations from 2017-2018 and 2019 caused by authoritarian rule of Vladimir Putin, repression of opposition, 2020 constitutional amendment which increased Putin's power and allowed him to stay in power until 2036, and the poisoning of opposition leader Alexei Navalny 2020. The protests began on 29 February with a march in Moscow in memory of a killed former Deputy Prime Minister and Putin's critic Boris Nemtsov, during which several opposition figures, including Navalny and Grigory Yavlinsky were giving speeches and accusing President Putin for assassination of Nemtsov. Similar rallies were held in others cities, including Saint Petersburg.

Another demand of the opposition was to release Sergei Furgal, a popular Governor of Khabarovsk Krai, whose arrest was viewed by critics as politically motivated.

Opposition leader Navalny was poisoned with Novichok in August by the FSB, resulting in his flight to Berlin, Germany for a medical treatment. When he returned to Russia on 17 January 2021, he was arrested and imprisoned, which fueled another wave of protests which was violently suppressed by the Putin's regime's forces.

== 2020 Nemtsov memorial march ==
The march in memory of Boris Nemtsov, former Deputy Prime Minister who became a leading critic of Vladimir Putin's government, have taken place on 29 February 2020. During this event, many opposition parties and groups gathered in cities across Russia, including Moscow, St. Petersburg, and Yekaterinburg.

Chairman of the Council of Deputies of Krasnoselsky district Ilya Yashin said that in his video that “There are moments when you can’t sit at home,” and that “Putin should not rule forever. It’s time to remind him of that.”, calling people to join the anti-Putin march.

Opposition politician from the Yabloko party Grigory Yavlisnky also appeared that day and accused President Putin for murder of Boris Nemtsov because of his dissent, claiming that former Deputy Prime Minister's death is an evidence for growing authoritarianism in Russia. In Saint Petersburg, Pavel Chuprunov was among the initiators of the memorial march. City authorities approved the event on the organisers' third application.

== Khabarovsk Krai protests ==
Another wave of protests emerged in July after an arrest of popular Governor of Khabarovsk Krai Sergei Furgal. The detention was viewed by critics as politically motivated and caused demonstrations, this time mostly in Siberia (Asian part) and Eastern Russia (Volga region).

== Protests in Bashkiria ==
There were also protests in the hill of Kushtau, Bashkorstan directed against the local authorities of Head of the Republic of Bashkortostan led by Fail Alsynov from 3 to 16 August. These demonstrations opposed the transfer of the Shihan's rights of mining to the Bashkir soda company. After long confrontation between local activists and authorities the latter suspended their mining plans and formally called sides to make a compromise over the mountain's future by offering a new plan to designate the mountain as national reserve for the nature conservation purpose.

== Navalny's poisoning ==
On 20 August, Navalny felt unwell during a plane flight from Tomsk to Moscow. He became ill and was taken to a hospital in Omsk after an emergency landing there, and then, he was put in a coma. His wife, Yulia Navalnaya, assumed that the entire incident is an attempt to assassinate her husband and begged to evacuate him to Charité hospital in Berlin, Germany. Navalny survived a poisoning operation and found out that the perpetrator was the Federal Security Service (FSB), publishing his own list of people involved in assassination attempt on his life (the so-called Navalny List or Navalny 35). Because FSB is widely viewed as controlled by the Russian government, Navalny accused President Vladimir Putin for trying to kill him.

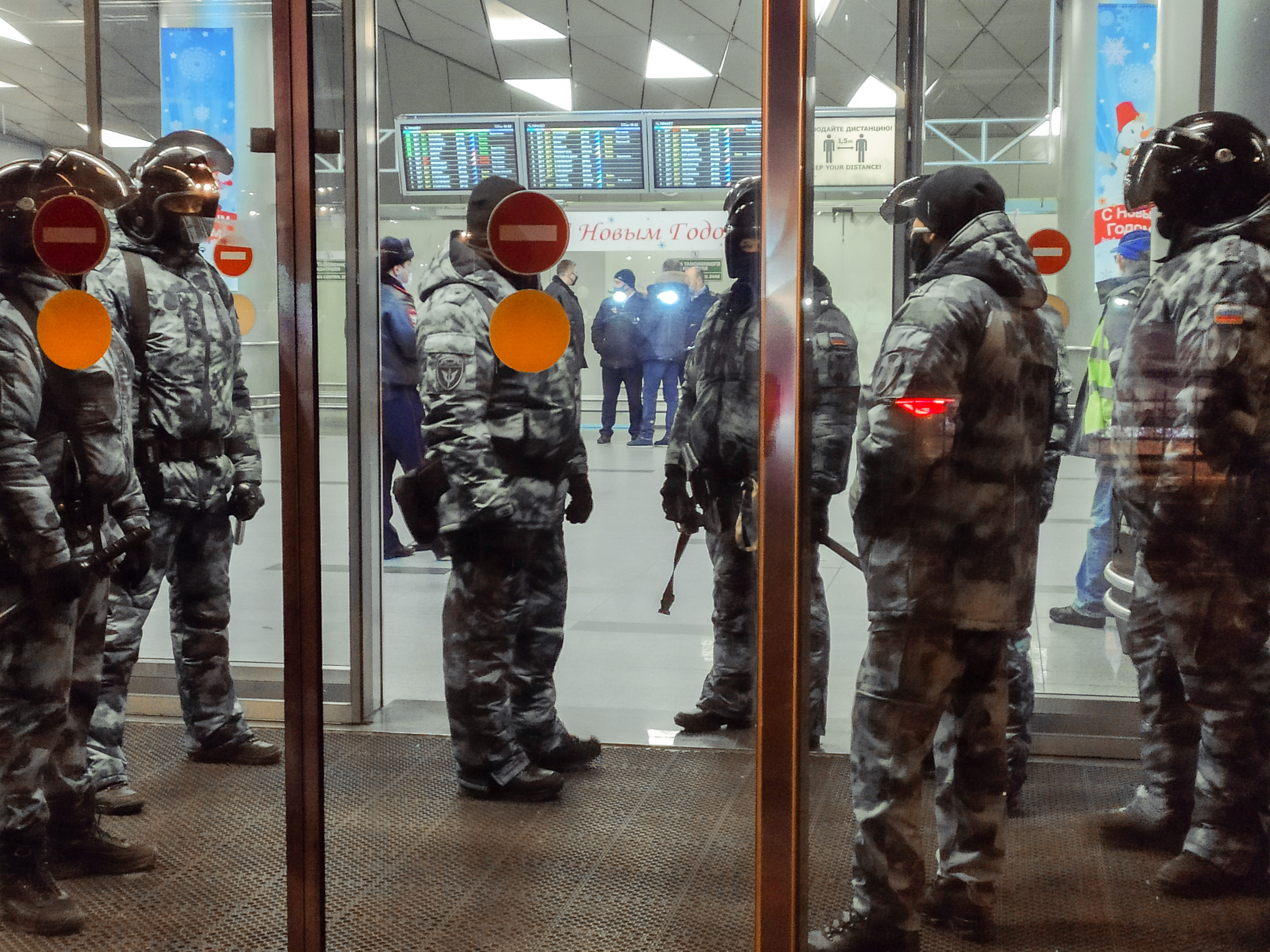
Law enforcement waiting for Navalny at Vnukovo airport at 18 January 2021

== Navalny's return and arrest ==
Navalny return from medical treatment in Germany to Russia on 17 January 2020 and was arrested, which caused another wave of demonstrations known as Navalny Protests.
