= Dawn (Russia) =

Dawn Рассвет
- Leader: Yekaterina Duntsova
- Founder: Yekaterina Duntsova
- Founded: 14 January 2024 (organising committee)
- Banned: 6 November 2026 (declared foreign agent)
- Youth wing: Youth Dawn (youth organization)
- Ideology: Anti-war; Liberalism
- Political position: Centre
- Colours: Salmon; Capri blue
- Slogan: Let's return the future to the country! (Russian: Вернём стране будущее!)

Website
- rassvet-party.info

The Dawn (Russian: Рассвет, romanized: Rassvet) is a Russian political party formed by the rejected presidential candidate Yekaterina Duntsova.

== Ideology ==
According to Duntsova's statements, "the country needs rapid changes: cessation of hostilities, democratic reforms, release of political prisoners".

According to Duntsova, the goal of the party is "to unite and bring decent people to power - those who want to live in the future, not in the past, in a peaceful and safe country where the priority is the well-being of all, not the enrichment of a select few".

== History ==
=== Background ===
On 23 December 2023, the Russian Central Election Commission refused to register the initiative group to nominate Yekaterina Duntsova for president, citing alleged errors in the submitted documents. Following the CEC's refusal, Duntsova approached the Yabloko party with a proposal to nominate her as a candidate in the election, but they refused the proposal.

Four days later, after the Supreme Court upheld Duntsova's ineligibility for the election, Duntsova said she would form her own party "in the near future". Duntsova also said that if municipal deputy Boris Nadezhdin is allowed to run, her team intends to help him collect signatures.

=== Formation ===
On 14 January 2024, a first meeting of the organising committee of the Dawn party was held in Tver. Duntsova said that the party would soon hold meetings of supporters in all regions of the country. Regional branches will be established, after which party members will start preparing for the elections. Duntsova also called for help in collecting signatures for presidential candidate Boris Nadezhdin.

After the meeting, Duntsova was detained by the police, who took her to a narcological dispensary to be tested for the presence of narcotic substances in her blood. The police soon released her.

On November 6, 2026, the Russian Ministry of Justice added the party to the foreign agent registry.

== Criticism ==
Pro-government Russian media have accused Duntsova of alleged links to exiled oligarch Mikhail Khodorkovsky.
