= Non-system opposition =

Grouping of oppositional forces in Russian politics

In modern Russian political terminology, the non-system opposition or non-systemic opposition (Russian: внесистемная оппозиция) are oppositional forces which operate outside of the official political establishment. Alternatively, the systemic opposition operates in the form of registered political parties.

There are two major reasons of the existence of the non-system opposition. First, the Russian Law on Political Parties originally set a high threshold for a political party to be registered, the highest hurdle having been the requirement to acquire at least 45,000 members. Second, a number of activists, such as Garry Kasparov and Vladimir Bukovsky, are in principle against registration, saying that the registration itself is a "vassal oath of allegiance to the authorities".

The emergence of the non-system political activists (and the introduction of the term) followed the 2003 Duma elections notable for the new extremely restrictive law about political parties. The period of 2004–2012 witnessed waves of mass political actions organized by the opposition movements. The spectrum of political views of the non-system opposition is extremely broad, and attempts to create "suprapolitical" associations, such as The Other Russia, eventually failed.

In 2007, Russian politologist Ivan Bolshakov argued that the term "non-systemic opposition" reflects neither ideological distance to the ruling party nor non-acceptance of democratic institutions. The non-systemic opposition refers to opposition parties that are "excluded" from the political system because they lack both a representation in the structures of state power and contacts with the ruling group. They predominantly use unconventional methods of political struggle, have limited resources, and are particularly active on social networks. In his opinion, they enjoy little trust among citizens.

In 2012, Ivan Tyutrin and Aleksandr Lukyanov of the Solidarnost movement wrote that the nonsystem/system dichotomy became outdated; the real dichotomy should be whether a political force is non-conformist or conformist with respect to the Putinist political system. Their arguments are: the radicalization of some "systemic opposition", decreased importance of registration during non-election time, alleviation of hurdles for registration due to Dmitry Medvedev's reforms, and efforts of the current establishment to introduce discord into opposition.

== See also ==
- Extra-parliamentary opposition
- Opposition to Vladimir Putin in Russia
- Anti-system politics
- Anti-politics
