= Sergey Mokhnatkin =

Russian prisoner of conscience (1954–2020)

- Сергей Мохнаткин
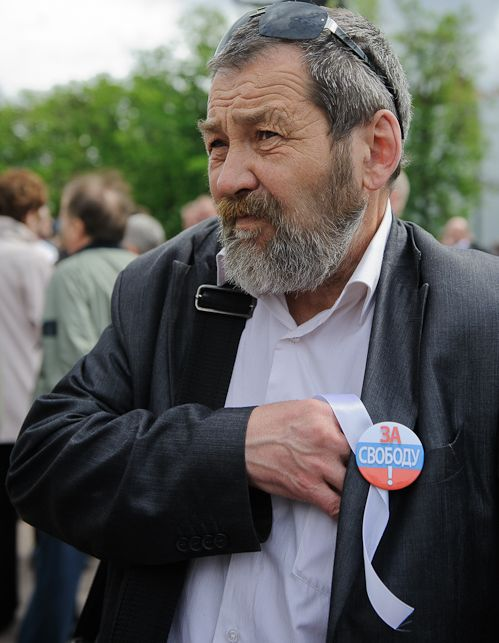
- Mokhnatkin in 2012
- Born: Sergey Yevgenievich Mokhnatkin; 6 March 1954; Izhevsk, RSFSR, Soviet Union
- Died: 28 May 2020 (aged 66); Moscow, Russia
- Resting place: Butovo Cemetery
- Occupation: human rights activist
- Spouse: Anna Krechetova
- Parent(s): Yevgeny Mokhnatkin; Mira Mokhnatkina
- Awards: Moscow Helsinki Group Award

Sergey Yevgenievich Mokhnatkin (Russian: Серге́й Евге́ньевич Мохна́ткин; 6 March 1954 — 28 May 2020) was a Russian political activist and human rights activist.

On 31 December 2009 Mokhnatkin was arrested while participating in the Strategy-31 protest action on Triumfalnaya Square in Moscow (he was accused of beating up an officer of the 2nd operational police regiment of the Main Internal Affairs Directorate in Moscow, police sergeant Dmitry Moiseyev) and was sentenced to 2 years 6 months in a general regime colony. While in the colony, Mokhnatkin defended his rights and the rights of other prisoners, for which he was repeatedly subjected to unlawful punishments. The Russian human rights community recognized him as a political prisoner.

On 21 April 2012 Mokhnatkin was pardoned without admitting guilt by the decree of the President of the Russian Federation Dmitry Medvedev. After the pardon, Mokhnatkin continued his human rights activities and participation in protest actions.

In December 2014, Mokhnatkin was again convicted on charges of using violence against a government official. In 2016, he was also convicted on charges of insulting a government official, and in 2017 on charges of disrupting the work of the colony. In prison, Mokhnatkin received a spinal injury. He developed complications after an injury sustained during his stay in correctional colony No. 4 in the city of Arkhangelsk. The FSIN officers broke his spine.

In December 2018, Mokhnatkin was released, but at the end of 2019, due to the consequences of an injury, he lost the ability to walk, was hospitalized and operated on. Mokhnatkin spent the next several months in the hospital. On 28 May 2020 he died of complications after surgery.
