= Mineralovodsky District =

Mineralovodsky District Минераловодский район (Russian)
- District
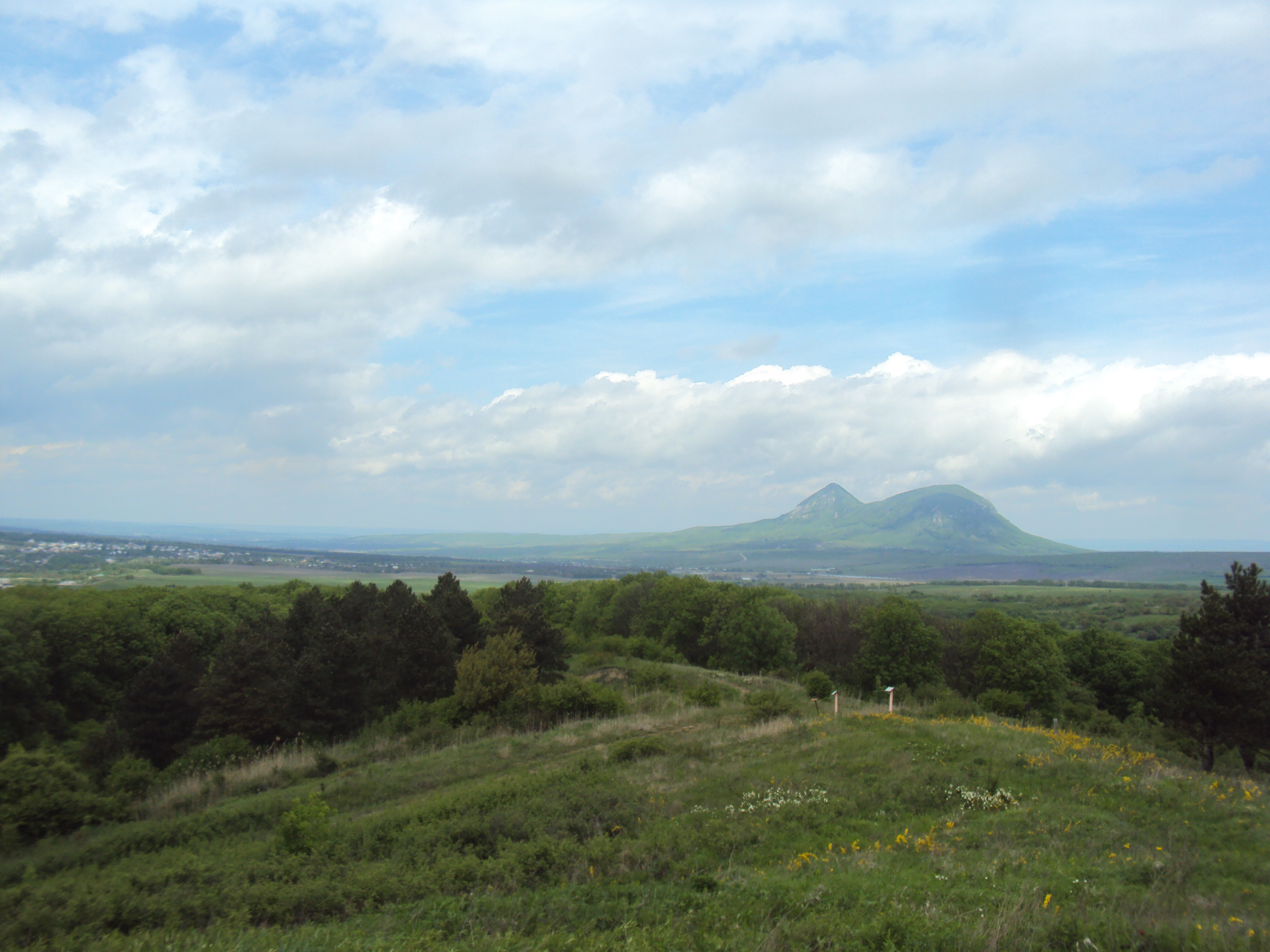
- Mount Verblyud, a protected area of Russia in Mineralovodsky District

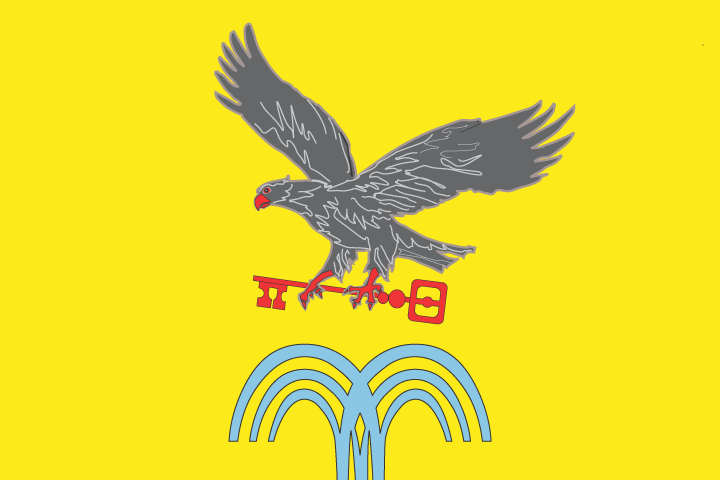
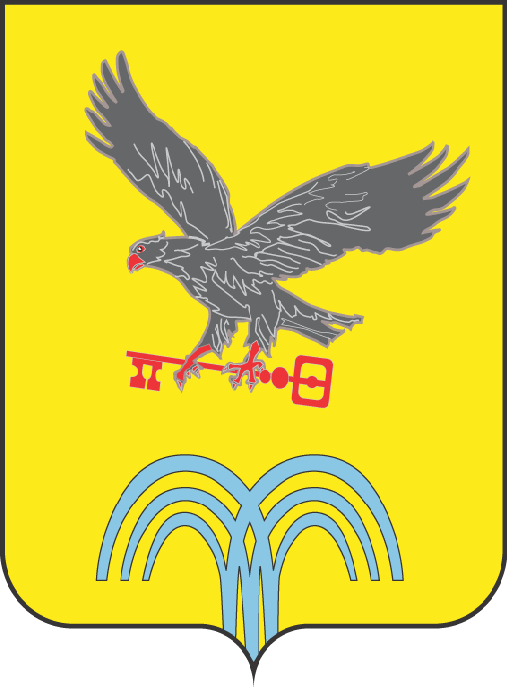
- Flag Coat of arms
- Location of Mineralovodsky District in Stavropol Krai
- Coordinates: 44°12′N 43°07′E
- Country: Russia
- Federal subject: Stavropol Krai
- Established: 1929
- Administrative center: Mineralnye Vody

Area
  - Total: 1,490 km^{2} (580 sq mi)

Population (2010 Census)
  - Total: 49,404
  - Density: 33.2/km^{2} (85.9/sq mi)
  - Urban: 0%
  - Rural: 100%

Administrative structure
  - Administrative divisions: 1 Settlements, 11 Selsoviets
  - Inhabited localities: 1 urban-type settlements, 51 rural localities

Municipal structure
  - Municipally incorporated as: Mineralovodsky Urban Okrug
- Time zone: UTC+3 (MSK)
- OKTMO ID: 07721000
- Website: http://www.min-vodi.ru

Mineralovodsky District (Russian: Минералово́дский райо́н) is an administrative district (raion), one of the twenty-six in Stavropol Krai, Russia. It is located in the south of the krai. The area of the district is 1,490 square kilometers (580 sq mi). Its administrative center is the town of Mineralnye Vody (which is not administratively a part of the district). Population: 49,404 (2010 census); 46,626 (2002 Census); 38,669 (1989 Census).

== Administrative and municipal status ==
Within the framework of administrative divisions, Mineralovodsky District is one of the twenty-six in the krai. The town of Mineralnye Vody serves as its administrative center, despite being incorporated separately as a town of krai significance—an administrative unit with the status equal to that of the districts.

As a municipal division, the territory of the district and the territory of the town of krai significance of Mineralnye Vody have been incorporated together as Mineralovodsky Urban Okrug since June 7, 2015. Prior to that, the district was incorporated as Mineralovodsky Municipal District and the town of krai significance of Mineralnye Vody was incorporated within it as Mineralnye Vody Urban Settlement.
