= Yekaterina Duntsova =

Russian politician (born 1983)

- Екатерина Дунцова
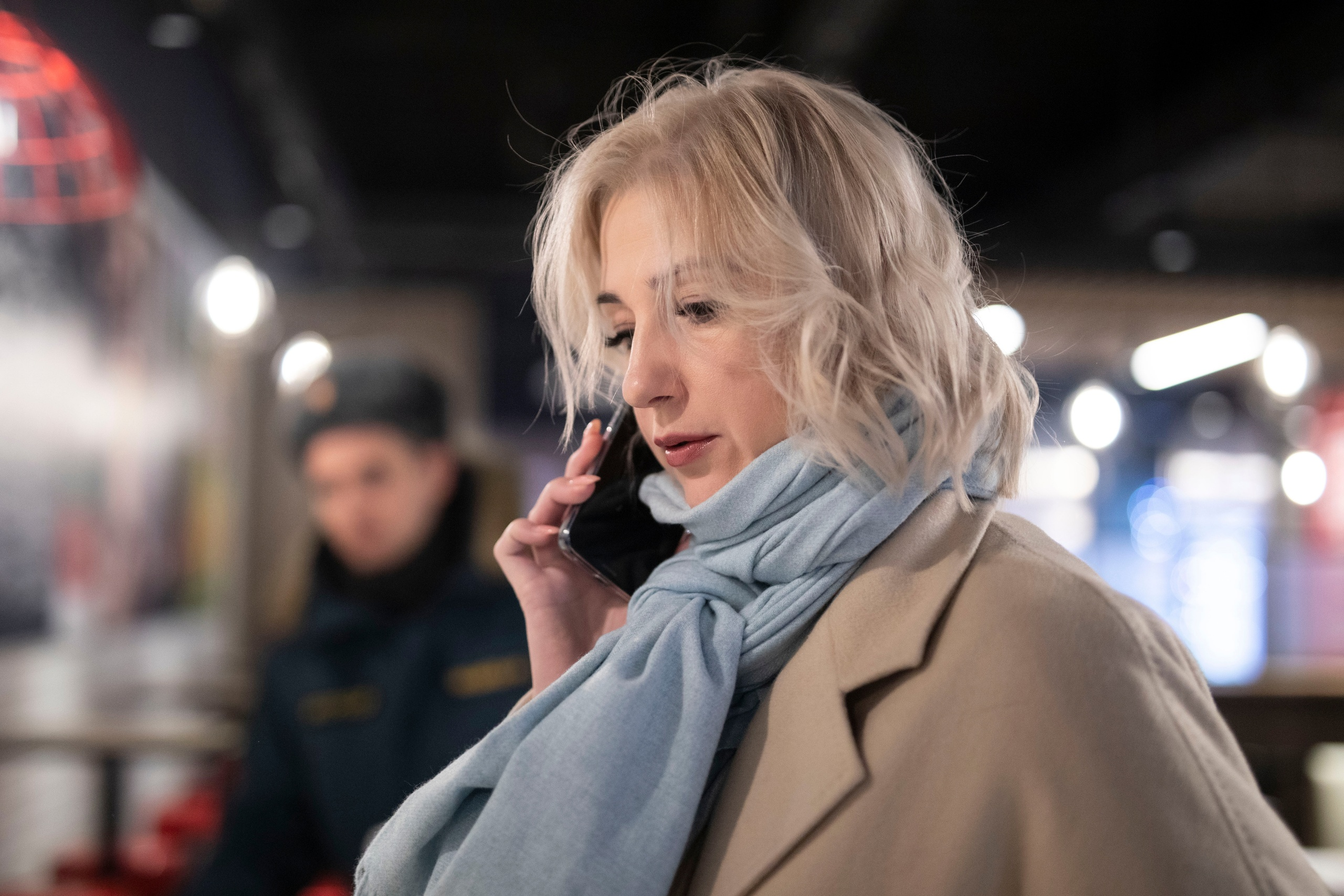
- Duntsova in 2023

Member of the Rzhev City Duma
- In office 2019–2022

Personal details
- Born: 24 April 1983 (age 43) Krasnoyarsk, Russian SFSR, Soviet Union
- Party: Dawn
- Other political affiliations: Independent (before 2024)
- Children: 3
- Education: Tver State University; Saint Petersburg State Institute of Film and Television

Yekaterina Sergeyevna Duntsova (Russian: Екатерина Сергеевна Дунцова; born 24 April 1983) is a Russian politician and journalist. She began her career as a journalist and was a member of the city duma of Rzhev from 2019 to 2022.

On 6 November 2023, Duntsova announced her intention to run for the presidency of Russia in the 2024 election; she said she would run as an independent candidate on an anti-war platform. The next month, her nomination documents were rejected by the Central Election Commission.

== Early life ==
Duntsova was born in Krasnoyarsk. In 1995, she had moved to Rzhev, Tver Oblast, where she graduated from high school.

== Journalism career ==
Duntsova began her career in 2003, when she worked for a year at the Rzhev municipal television company, then for several years she was the head of a school television studio.

She also ran independent television company RiT, a project she and her husband started. Her television company covered problems on the municipal level, namely housing and communal services, lawlessness of officials and crime.

== Political career ==
=== As a local politician ===
In 2009, Duntsova gathered more than 4,000 signatures against the abolition of elections of the mayor of Rzhev.

From 2019 to 2022, she was a member of the Rzhev City Duma.

=== Presidential campaign ===
In November 2023, Duntsova announced her intention to run for President of Russia as an independent candidate, using the slogan "Вернём стране будущее!" ("We'll bring back the country's future!"). On the same day, she announced the collection of signatures, needing 500 for the first step in the process.

Duntsova explained her intention to run for president by saying that "Russia has been moving in the wrong direction for the last ten years: the course is not aimed at development, but at self-destruction." Duntsova's platform stood for ending the war with Ukraine, initiating democratic reforms, releasing political prisoners including Alexei Navalny, restoring relations with other countries, changing budget priorities, and supporting minorities, including LGBT people.

On 20 November 2023, Duntsova was summoned to the prosecutor's office. Amongst other topics, they reportedly demanded that she explain her position on the Russo-Ukrainian war. Duntsova later told the media that she refused to answers the officials' questions relating to the war, other than to say that she is in compliance with all relevant laws.

Having collected the necessary 500 signatures to form a support group, on 17 December 2023, the group held an official meeting to nominate her. During the meeting, the electricity was turned off and police entered the building, although it was eventually turned back on and there were no further incidents. Duntsova was therefore nominated as planned, and now needed a total of 300,000 signatures by 31 January 2024, to be placed on the ballot. On 20 December, Duntsova submitted her application to the Central Election Commission (CEC) to be included on the ballot.

On 23 December 2023, the Central Election Commission (CEC) blocked her from running on the ballot after rejecting her nomination documents; the CEC said that it found more than 100 misprints in her documents. In particular, the CEC published scans of documents submitted by Duntsova, which show typos in the names of members of the initiatory group and informal comments in the text of the documents. Also, some members of the initiative group signed with the word "yes", "apple" or used a drawing of a cat as a signature. In addition, the minutes of the meeting of the initiative group did not reflect information about the election and composition of the counting group.

This decision was promptly criticized as politically motivated. Leonid Gozman pointed out, that the "cowardly" taken decision had not been based on fears of her being elected, but for the sudden possibility for citizens, to restore "a forgotten sense of citizenship" by collecting the necessary signatures.

Duntsova said that she planned to appeal the decision in court, although she did not dismiss claims that there had been errors in the filed paperwork, saying the application had been put together on short notice and she had difficulty finding a lawyer to assist her in certifying the paperwork. She also said that she intended to ask the Yabloko party to nominate her as a candidate. Later that day, Yabloko party leader Grigory Yavlinsky said in an interview that he was unsure if the party would consider Duntsova's nomination.

On 27 December, Russia’s Supreme Court rejected Duntsova’s appeal.

=== Post-election ===
On 31 May 2024, Dunstsova was declared a "foreign agent" by Russian authorities.

== Personal life ==
Duntsova has three children. A November 2023 article in ЭХО (Echo) described her as separated from her former husband as of two years previously.

She coordinates the work of a volunteer search and rescue team in Rzhev.
