= Farid Babayev =

Russian politician (1959 - 2007)

- Фарид Бабаев
- Born: Farid Nametalievich Babayev; 8 August 1959; Jaba, Akhtynsky District, Dagestan Autonomous Soviet Socialist Republic, USSR
- Died: 24 November 2007 (aged 48); Makhachkala, Russia

Farid Nametalievich Babayev (Russian: Фарид Наметалиевич Бабаев; 8 August 1959 – 24 November 2007) was a Russian politician with the liberal anti-Kremlin Yabloko party. He was assassinated in 2007.

== Career ==
Babayev was a candidate of the regional list for the party in the 2 December elections.

== Death ==
Babayev was shot late 21 November 2007 in the entryway of his apartment building in Makhachkala, the capital of Dagestan. Doctors said he was shot four times, including at least once in the head. He died on 24 November of his wounds.

== Reaction ==
Yabloko party leader, Grigory Yavlinsky called Babayev "one more victim of the authoritarian regime of Putin, where the physical destruction of your political opponents has become the norm."
