= Mineralnye Vody =

Town in Stavropol Krai, Russia

Mineralnye Vody Минеральные Воды
- Town
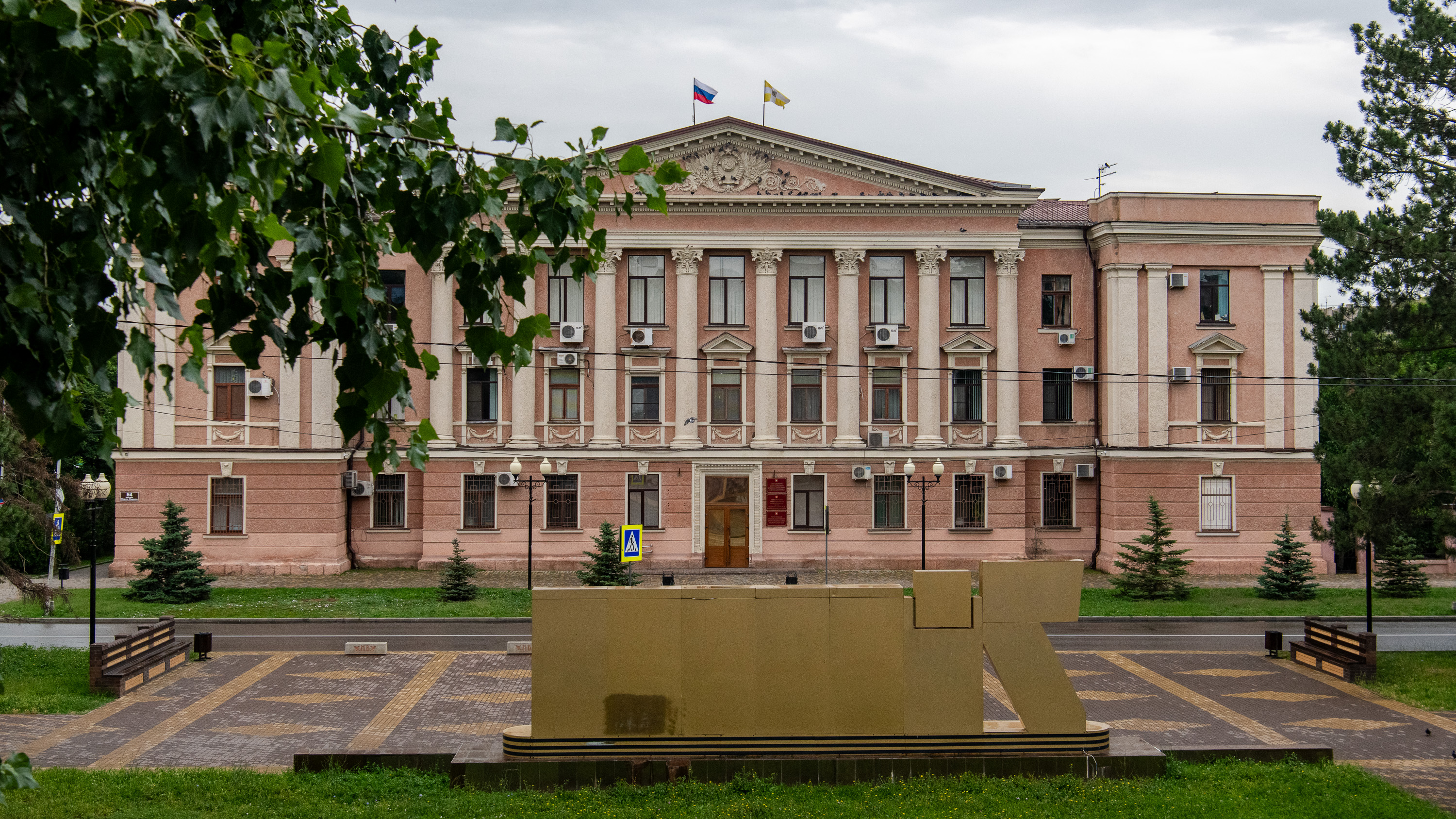
- Town Hall

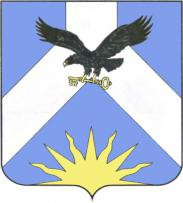
- Coat of arms
- Interactive map of Mineralnye Vody
- Location of Mineralnye Vody Mineralnye Vody (European Russia) Mineralnye Vody (Russia)
- Coordinates: 44°13′N 43°08′E
- Country: Russia
- Federal subject: Stavropol Krai
- Founded: 1878
- Town status since: 1922

Government
  - Head: Konstantin Gamayunov

Area
  - Total: 51.55 km^{2} (19.90 sq mi)
- Elevation: 300 m (980 ft)

Population (2010 Census)
  - Total: 76,728
  - Estimate (2023): 69,569 (−9.3%)
  - Rank: 213th in 2010
  - Density: 1,488/km^{2} (3,855/sq mi)

Administrative status
  - Subordinated to: town of krai significance of Mineralnye Vody
  - Capital of: town of krai significance of Mineralnye Vody, Mineralovodsky District

Municipal status
  - Urban okrug: Mineralovodsky Urban Okrug
  - Capital of: Mineralovodsky Urban Okrug
- Time zone: UTC+3 (MSK)
- Postal codes: 357200–357205, 357207, 357209, 357210–357212, 357260, 357261, 357265, 357270
- Dialing code: +7 8792
- OKTMO ID: 07721000001
- Website: web.archive.org/web/20120114070232/http://www.gorodminvody.ru/

Mineralnye Vody (Russian: Минеральные Воды, IPA: [mʲɪnʲɪˈralʲnɨjə ˈvodɨ, mʲɪn ˈvodɨ], Colloquialism: Russian: Минводы, IPA: [mʲɪnvodɨ] Minvody; lit. mineral waters) is a town in Stavropol Krai, Russia, located along the Kuma River and the main rail line between Rostov-on-Don in Russia and Baku in Azerbaijan. Population: 76,728 (2010 census); 75,644 (2002 census); 70,961 (1989 Soviet census).

Mineralnye Vody also has an airport inside of the city named Mineralnye Vody Airport.

== History ==
The town owes its birth to the construction of the Rostov-Vladikavkaz Railway, which was completed in 1875. In 1878, the village which developed around the construction was officially recognized and named Sultanovsky. In 1906 the name was changed to Illarionovsky, in honor of Count I. I. Vorontsov-Dashkov, a local nobleman. In October 1921, at the end of the civil war when Soviet rule had been established, the name was again changed to Mineralnye Vody and town status was granted. According to the 1926 census, it had a population of 17,572, 55.7% Russian, 34.8% Ukrainian, 3.1% German, 2.2% Belarusian, 1.4% Tatar, 0.9% Armenian, and 0.8% Polish.

During World War II, the town was occupied by Nazi Germany between August 10, 1942 and January 11, 1943. During the German occupation, between 6,500 and 7,500 Jews were murdered in anti-tank ditches located next to the city. The Germans operated the AGSSt 11 assembly center for prisoners of war in the city.

== Administrative and municipal status ==
Within the framework of administrative divisions, Mineralnye Vody serves as the administrative center of Mineralovodsky District, even though it is not a part of it. As an administrative division, it is incorporated separately as the town of krai significance of Mineralnye Vody — an administrative unit with the status equal to that of the districts. As a municipal division, the territories of the town of krai significance of Mineralnye Vody and of Mineralovodsky District have been incorporated as Mineralovodsky Urban Okrug since June 7, 2015. Prior to that, the district was incorporated as Mineralovodsky Municipal District, with the town of krai significance of Mineralnye Vody being incorporated within it as Mineralnye Vody Urban Settlement.

== Economy ==
The town is served by the Mineralnye Vody Airport, connecting the town with some Russian and international destinations. It is connected by R217 highway (Russia) to Krasnodar and Derbent. The R217 forms part of European route E50.

== Geography ==
The town is located along the Kuma River and the main rail line between Rostov-on-Don in Russia and Baku in Azerbaijan.

=== Climate ===
Mineralnye Vody's climate classified as humid continental (Köppen climate classification Dfa).

Climate data for Mineralnye Vody
Month	Jan	Feb	Mar	Apr	May	Jun	Jul	Aug	Sep	Oct	Nov	Dec	Year
Record high °C (°F)	19.5 (67.1)	22.3 (72.1)	30.3 (86.5)	34.5 (94.1)	34.9 (94.8)	37.5 (99.5)	40.2 (104.4)	41.1 (106.0)	38.8 (101.8)	34.1 (93.4)	25.8 (78.4)	20.5 (68.9)	41.1 (106.0)
Mean daily maximum °C (°F)	1.7 (35.1)	2.5 (36.5)	8.4 (47.1)	16.8 (62.2)	21.8 (71.2)	26.5 (79.7)	29.8 (85.6)	29.3 (84.7)	23.9 (75.0)	16.4 (61.5)	8.2 (46.8)	2.8 (37.0)	15.7 (60.3)
Daily mean °C (°F)	−2.5 (27.5)	−2.4 (27.7)	2.9 (37.2)	10.1 (50.2)	15.1 (59.2)	19.6 (67.3)	22.7 (72.9)	22.0 (71.6)	16.8 (62.2)	10.2 (50.4)	3.4 (38.1)	−1.3 (29.7)	9.7 (49.5)
Mean daily minimum °C (°F)	−5.7 (21.7)	−6.1 (21.0)	−1.2 (29.8)	4.6 (40.3)	9.2 (48.6)	13.6 (56.5)	16.2 (61.2)	15.7 (60.3)	11.2 (52.2)	5.8 (42.4)	0.2 (32.4)	−4.6 (23.7)	4.9 (40.8)
Record low °C (°F)	−33.3 (−27.9)	−31.6 (−24.9)	−23.4 (−10.1)	−7.6 (18.3)	−2.9 (26.8)	3.2 (37.8)	7.4 (45.3)	4.2 (39.6)	−4.6 (23.7)	−18.0 (−0.4)	−23.6 (−10.5)	−31.5 (−24.7)	−33.3 (−27.9)
Average precipitation mm (inches)	18 (0.7)	18 (0.7)	28 (1.1)	54 (2.1)	66 (2.6)	86 (3.4)	69 (2.7)	48 (1.9)	35 (1.4)	38 (1.5)	31 (1.2)	28 (1.1)	519 (20.4)
Source: Pogoda.ru.net
