= Mineralovodsky Urban Okrug =

Mineralovodsky Urban Okrug (Russian: Минералово́дский городско́й о́круг) is a municipal formation (an urban okrug) in Stavropol Krai, Russia, one of the nine urban okrugs in the krai. Its territory comprises the territories of two administrative divisions of Stavropol Krai—Mineralovodsky District and the town of krai significance of Mineralnye Vody.

It was established by the Law #51-kz of Stavropol Krai of May 28, 2015 by merging the municipal formations of former Mineralovodsky Municipal District into Mineralovodsky Urban Okrug.
