= Ilya Ponomarev =

Russian-Ukrainian politician (born 1975)

- Илья Пономарёв
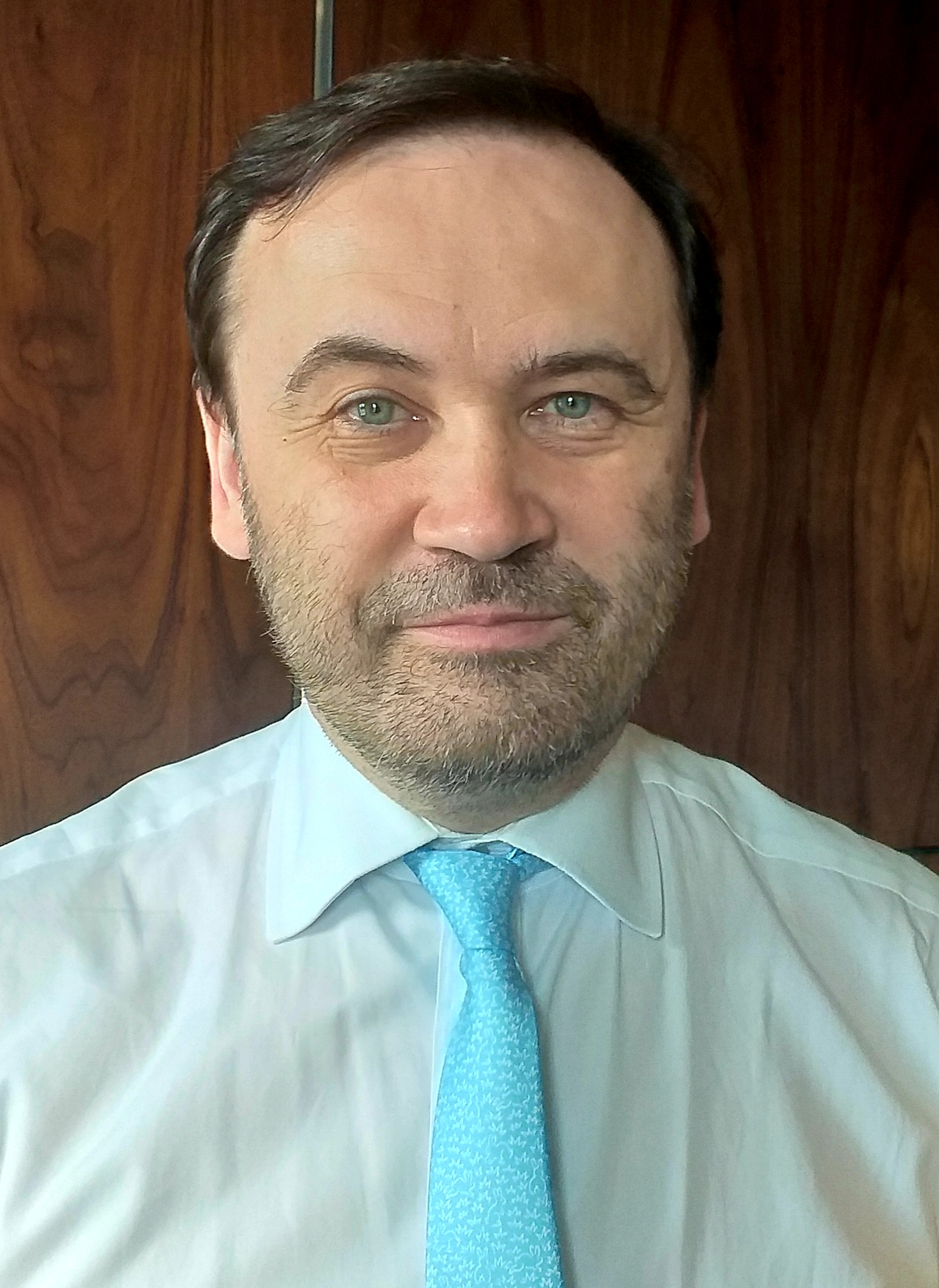
- Ponomarev in 2023

Member of the State Duma
- In office 24 December 2007 – 10 June 2016 (Note: Ponomarev has not resided in Russia since August 2014, but he was not removed from the State Duma until 2016.)
- Constituency: A Just Russia, Novosibirsk Oblast party list

Personal details
- Born: 6 August 1975 (age 51) Moscow, Russian SFSR, Soviet Union (now Russia)
- Citizenship: Ukraine (since 2019); Russia (formerly)
- Party: Communist (2002–2007); A Just Russia (2007–2013); Green Alliance (2014)
- Other political affiliations: Congress of People's Deputies (2022–present)
- Spouse: Ekaterina Ponomareva
- Children: 2
- Parent(s): Vladimir Ponomarev (father); Larisa Ponomaryova (mother)
- Occupation: Businessman, politician
- Known for: Work with Skolkovo Foundation and hi-tech parks, sole vote against annexation of Crimea, position against Russian war in Ukraine, participation in protest movement in Russia

Military service
- Allegiance: Ukraine
- Branch/service: Territorial Defense Forces
- Years of service: 2022–present
- Battles/wars: Russo-Ukrainian War; Russian invasion of Ukraine

Ilya Vladimirovich Ponomarev (Note: The surname is also transliterated as Ponomaryov or Ponomaryev Russian: Илья́ Влади́мирович Пономарёв Ukrainian: Ілля Володимирович Пономарьов, romanized: Illia Volodymyrovych Ponomariov) (born 6 August 1975) is a Russian-born Ukrainian politician.

A member of the Russian State Duma from 2007 to 2016, he notably chose not to vote in favour of the Russian gay propaganda law (he abstained) and to vote against Russia's annexation of Crimea in March 2014. In 2015, while in the United States, Ponomarev was formally charged in Russia with embezzlement, which he called politically motivated. In 2016, he was impeached for not performing his duties, and he went into exile in Ukraine, where he obtained Ukrainian citizenship in 2019.

Following the start of the Russian invasion of Ukraine in 2022, Ponomarev stated that he had joined Ukraine's Territorial Defense Forces, and he denounced the invasion. Ponomarev also endorsed acts of sabotage and arson in Russia, and launched a Russian-language opposition television channel called February Morning (Russian: Утро Февраля, romanized: Utro Fevralya). Following the killing of Darya Dugina, Ponomarev has claimed to have been in contact with a hitherto-unknown group called the National Republican Army which he said claimed responsibility for the killing. He claims not to be a member but a supporter who is trusted to receive press releases. Ponomarev's claims have been treated by observers with scepticism.

Ponomarev is the author of the book, Does Putin Have to Die?: The Story of How Russia Becomes a Democracy after Losing to Ukraine, released 4 October 2022 by Skyhorse Publishing.

== Early life and education ==
Ponomarev was born in Moscow. He holds a BSc in physics from Moscow State University and a Master of Public Administration from the Russian State Social University. He started his career when he was 14 years old at the Institute for Nuclear Safety (IBRAE), Russian Academy of Sciences. Ponomarev was one of the founders of two successful high technology start-ups in Russia, the first one (RussProfi) when he was sixteen years old. His first job position was at the Institute for Nuclear Safety (IBRAE) at the Russian Academy of Sciences. In 1995 and 1996, Ponomarev acted as a representative of the networking software company Banyan Systems in Russia, creating one of the largest distributed networks in Russia for the now-defunct oil company Yukos. Following jobs at Schlumberger and Yukos in the late 1990s, he became a successful technology entrepreneur. From 2002 to 2007, Ponomarev served as the chief information officer of the Communist Party of the Russian Federation.

== Career ==
Ponomarev held the role of vice president at Yukos Oil Company, at the time the largest Russian oil and gas corporation. Ponomarev's duties during those four years included those of corporate CIO, and chief executive of Yukos' subsidiary company ARRAVA IMC, which specialized in advanced oilfield technologies and services. Ponomarev later founded the Siberian Internet Company, which was the origin of prominent Internet projects in Russia such as Gazeta.ru. He also spent time as the Director for Business Development and Marketing for Schlumberger Oilfield Services, and the vice president for strategy, regional development, and government relations at IBS, which was at that time the largest Russian system integration and software consulting company.

From 2006 to 2007, Ponomarev served as the national coordinator for the "high-tech parks task force", a $6 billion private-public project to develop a network of small communities across the country to foster innovation and R&D activities.

In December 2007, Ponomarev was elected to the State Duma, representing Novosibirsk. In the Duma, Ponomarev chaired the Innovation and Venture Capital subcommittee of the Committee for Economic Development and Entrepreneurship, and the Technology Development subcommittee of the Committee of Information Technologies and Communications. He introduced and secured passage of legalization of limited liability partnerships in Russia, the Net Businesses Act, and tax breaks for technology companies.

In June 2010, Ponomarev became an advisor to Viktor Vekselberg, President of the Skolkovo Foundation, on international technology development and commercialization.

Ponomarev's political views are considered to be "unorthodox left": a progressive libertarian position. Some people describe him as "neo-communist", and critics inside the Communist Party of Russia have identified him as "neotrotskyist". Ponomarev's policy goals included the following:

- equal access to education, to create equal opportunities for everyone
- a non-restrictive government which would be gradually replaced by direct democracy
- promotion of social and business entrepreneurship and innovation to transform society
- visa-free travel and abolition of national borders
- replacement of the presidential republic in Russia with a parliamentary democracy, based on clear separation of powers, a strong independent judiciary, and federalism (with most taxes collected and spent by the regional governments)
- protection of personal freedoms for oppressed groups, including increased rights and protections for women and LGBT people

Internationally, Ponomarev advocated a broader "Northern Union" between the nations of Europe, the Americas, and the former USSR, but strongly criticizes the American model of globalization exemplified by the IMF, the WTO and the G8 structures. He describes his proposals as "social globalism", and is critical of nationalism and clericalism. He also criticized the privatization process in Russia, and blamed its neoliberal architects for the failure to establish a true democracy in Russia.

In April 2014, Ponomarev organized a coalition of opposition groups for the election of the Mayor of Novosibirsk, and withdrew his own candidacy to support the coalition's candidate: Communist Anatoly Lokot, who won the election.

He was a member of the Society of Petroleum Engineers (IT), Council for Foreign and Defense Policies, and the Council for National Strategy, and a fellow at the Open Russia foundation. He also chaired the Boards of Trustees of the Institute of Innovation Studies (a think tank working on legislation for high-tech industries) and the Open Projects Foundation (an investment vehicle for projects in crowdfunding, crowdsourcing and open government). In 2010 Ponomarev co-founded the Korean-Russian Business Council (KRBC).. In 2014, Ponomarev founded the Institute of Siberia, an analytical center focused on the regional development of Siberia.

During his political career, he was a member of the Communist Party of the Russian Federation from 2002 to 2007, and a member of the Central Committee of the social-democrat political party A Just Russia from 2007 to 2013. In the spring of 2014, he took part in forming an alliance between Greens and Social Democrats.

=== Opposition to Putin ===
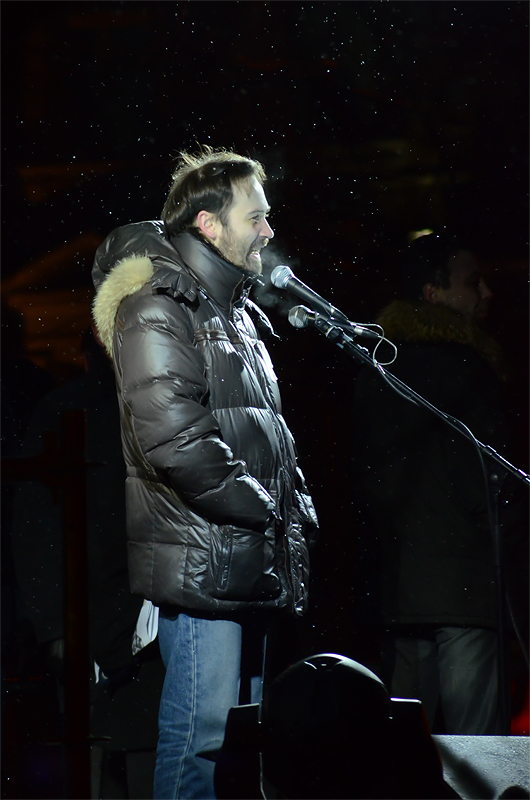
Ponomarev in March 2012

In 2012, Ponomarev and fellow MP Dmitry Gudkov took a leadership role in street protests against Putin's rule. Following the 4 March presidential election, in which Putin was elected for his third term as president, Ponomarev accused the government of rigging the election, claiming that it should have been close enough for a runoff. In May, Ponomarev criticized Putin's decision to retain Igor Shuvalov in his cabinet despite a corruption scandal. The following month, Ponomarev and Gudkov led a filibuster against a bill by Putin's United Russia party which allowed large fines to be imposed on anti-government protesters; though the filibuster was unsuccessful, the action attracted widespread attention. Later, Ponomarev joined other political leaders in a successful challenge to the legislation before the Constitutional Court, overturning some of its provisions.

In June 2012, Ponomarev made a speech in the Duma in which he called United Russia members "crooks and thieves", a phrase originally used by anti-corruption activist Alexei Navalny. In September of that year, Duma members voted to censure Ponomarev and bar him from speaking for one month. United Russia members also proposed charging him with defamation.

In July, he strongly criticized the government response to the widespread flooding in Southern Russia Krymsk, which killed 172 people. Together with several other civil activists, including Alyona Popova, Mitya Aleshkovsky, Danila Lindele and Maria Baronova, he organized a nationwide fundraising campaign which generated almost one million dollars in small donations to aid flood victims.

In December 2012, Ponomarev was the most vocal critic of the Dima Yakovlev Law, which restricted international adoption of Russian orphans (he was the only MP to vote against the bill in the first reading, and one of only eight opponents during the final reading). In 2013, Ponomarev was the only MP who refused to support the gay propaganda law. On 20 March 2014, Ponomarev was the only State Duma member to vote against the accession of Crimea to Russia following its annexation.

=== Internet censorship ===
In 2012, Ponomarev supported the Internet Restriction Bill, with the stated purpose of fighting online child pornography and drug sales, introduced by fellow Just Russia parliamentarian Yelena Mizulina. Critics compared the results to those of the Chinese Internet firewall: a RosKomCenzura blocklist of censored pages, domain names, and IP addresses. Ponomarev claimed that he wished to ultimately limit government involvement in Internet regulation and allow more self-regulation, but Maxim "Parker" Kononenko (a Russian blogger and journalist) accused Ponomarev of acting in the commercial interests of a technology company which had Ponomarev's father Vladimir as a member of the board of directors According to the law, all Internet providers are obliged to install expensive DPI hardware, which it was believed would be sold by said company. However, the company ultimately never sold any DPI servers, and Vladimir Ponomarev resigned from the board to avoid the appearance of impropriety.

In July 2013, Ponomarev stated during a meeting of the Pirate Party of Russia that his support for Mizulina's bill had been a mistake; he later voted against new initiatives by the Russian government to restrict Internet freedom, and became instrumental in the campaign against the "Russian version of SOPA". Despite this, Ponomarev is portrayed by some other opposition activists (such as Alexei Navalny and Leonid Volkov) as a "censorship lobbyist", which Ponomarev claims is due to unrelated political disagreements and the struggle for influence over the Russian Internet community.

=== Leonid Razvozzhayev incident ===
In October 2012, the pro-government news channel NTV aired a documentary which accused Ponomarev's aide Leonid Razvozzhayev of arranging a meeting between a former opposition leader, the Left Front's Sergei Udaltsov, and Givi Targamadze, a Georgian official, for the purpose of overthrowing President Vladimir Putin. A spokesman for Russian investigators stated that the government was considering terrorism charges against Udaltsov, and Razvozzhayev, Udaltsov, and Konstantin Lebedev, an assistant of Udaltsov's, were charged with "plotting mass riots". Razvozzhayev fled to Kyiv, Ukraine, where he applied for asylum from the United Nations High Commissioner for Refugees, but disappeared after leaving the office for lunch. He resurfaced in Moscow three days later, where the website Life News recording him leaving a Moscow courthouse, shouting that he had been abducted and tortured. A spokesman for Russia's Investigative Committee claimed that Razvozzhayev had not been abducted, but had turned himself in freely and volunteered a confession of his conspiracy with Udaltsov and Lebedev to cause widespread rioting.

Vladimir Burmatov, a United Russia MP, called on Ponomarev to resign from the State Duma for his association with Razvozzhayev.

In August 2014, both Udaltsov and Razvozzhayev were sentenced to four and a half years in prison.

=== Russian annexation of Crimea and accusations of embezzlement ===
Ponomarev was the only member of the State Duma to vote against annexation of Crimea during the 2014 Russian invasion of Ukraine. Despite his criticism of the 2014 Ukrainian revolution as being driven by an alliance of neoliberals and nationalists, he justified his position in the Duma by saying that it was necessary to maintain friendly relations with the "brotherly Ukrainian nation" and avoid military confrontation, and argued that Russia's actions in Crimea would push Ukraine outside the traditional sphere of Russian influence and possibly provoke further expansion of NATO. After the 445–1 vote, many people called for his resignation. He was the target of public demonization including a huge billboard in the center of Moscow describing him as a "national traitor". He was also threatened with censure and expulsion, but responded that deputies cannot be prosecuted or removed because of the way they vote, and the parliament took no further action regarding the status of Ponomarev as deputy.

In August 2014, while he was in California, federal bailiffs froze Ponomarev's bank accounts and announced that they would not allow him to return to Russia, due to an ongoing investigation. He began living in San Jose, California, but since 2016 is a permanent resident of Ukraine's capital Kyiv, effectively in exile. In April 2015, the Duma attempted to revoke his constitutional protection from criminal prosecution.

Russian investigators claimed Ponomarev had embezzled 22 million rubles earmarked for the Skolkovo technology hub, an accusation Ponomarev describes as politically motivated. Russian investigators alleged that Skolkovo vice-president Aleksey Beltyukov had paid Ponomarev about $750,000 for ten lectures and one research paper; Ponomarev was initially not prosecuted for this because of his parliamentary immunity, but a court ordered him to return a part of the money. However, later in 2015, the Moscow Bauman Court heard Ponomaryov's case in absentia and decided to arrest him, issuing an international warrant. Despite not residing in Russia, Ponomarev continued to hold his parliamentary position, and would technically have remained an active member of the Duma until the September 2016 Duma election.

On 10 June 2016, the State Duma impeached Ponomarev for truancy and not performing his duties. It was the first application of the controversial 2016 law that allows Duma to impeach its deputies.

=== Exile ===
Ponomarev told The Daily Beast in April 2016 that he lived in Ukraine's capital Kyiv full-time. Ukraine granted him a Ukrainian temporary residence permit. The government of Ukraine under Petro Poroshenko granted Ponomarev Ukrainian citizenship in 2019.

From exile he continued to speak to the Western press as a commentator on deteriorating Russia–Ukraine relations and clampdown on dissent in Russia. After fellow former Russian MP Denis Voronenkov was shot and killed in Kyiv on 23 March 2017, Ponomarev was given personal protection by the Ukrainian Security Service. Voronenkov was on his way to meet Ponomarev when he was shot.

==== Response to 2022 invasion of Ukraine ====
Following the beginning of the Russian invasion of Ukraine, Ponomarev joined the Armed Forces of Ukraine. In an interview with Meduza, Ponomarev claimed he had joined the Territorial Defense Forces and "took up a machine gun." Ponomarev explained his joining the Ukrainian forces as "not fighting against [Russia], I'm fighting against Putin and Putinism and Russian fascism," and compared his service to Ukraine to Willy Brandt's assistance to the Allies against Nazi Germany.

With the war continuing, Ponomarev launched a Russian-language YouTube-based video news outlet called "February Morning" (Russian: Утро Февраля), an accompanying Telegram-based news service "Rospartizan" (Russian: Роспартизан), as well as a central website utro02.tv.

Profiling the operations in June 2022, The Guardian notes that the outlets cover anti-government "partisan" activity in Russia, such as attacks on military recruitment centers, and endorse them to the extent of including instructions on bomb-making and operations security tradecraft. Asked whether he should be called a "foreign agent", similar to other journalists branded by the Kremlin under Russian 2022 war censorship laws, Ponomarev replied "I would be proud if they called me that. Terrorist, extremist, it's an act of recognition."

Ponomarev has been outspoken against what he views as the comfort and complacency of Russians including those privately opposed to Putin. Either in spite or because of his own exile, since the outbreak of war he has exhorted Russians not to flee the country but to fight the regime. He has gone so far as to support Kaja Kallas's call for Schengen Area states to cease issuing tourist visas to Russian nationals and restricting the movement to refugees who have fought the regime.

In a May 2022 conference of exiles in Vilnius sponsored by the Free Russia Forum, Ponomarev appealed to attendees to support the arsons of military commissariats in Russia. A Spektr (Russian: Спектр) reporter noted an indifferent response from the attendees.

In a June 2022 interview with Tim Sebastian of Deutsche Welle's Conflict Zone, Ponomarev maintained that Putin "wants to crush NATO, that's his strategic goal." Ponomarev is despondent about the democratic process in Russia: "What Vladimir Putin.. taught Russians.. is that there is no way to get rid of him through the elections process."

==== Assassination of Darya Dugina and claims about National Republican Army ====
Ponomarev and his media outlets came to the attention of Western news outlets following the 20 August 2022 car bomb assassination of Darya Dugina. Ponomarev personally read a statement claiming responsibility for the attack from a hitherto-unknown group calling itself National Republican Army (NRA) (Russian: Национальная республиканская армия (НРА)). The statement condemned both Dugina and her father, Eurasianist political philosopher Aleksandr Dugin, who was nearly killed in the same attack. Ponomarev spoke enthusiastically about the assassination, calling it a "[A] new page in Russian resistance to Putinism. New—but not the last."

Ponomarev also used both February Morning and Rospartizan to publicize the purported manifesto of National Republican Army declaring Vladimir Putin an usurper and public enemy to be destroyed. The statement calls for the mutiny of Russian military to end to "fratricidal war between the Slavic peoples." The purported manifesto also calls for the adoption of the white-blue-white flag in place of the Russian tricolor; the white-blue-white flag motif had previously been adopted by February Morning on air and in social media profiles.

Russia's state-owned TASS news agency quoted the Federal Security Service claimed the assassin was a Ukrainian citizen named Natalya Vovk. Ponomarev told Meduza that his contacts deny that Vovk directly carried out the attack, while also leaving open the possibility that she had some other undisclosed role. Ponomarev also claimed that he contributed to her escape from Russia, and called her "a person who deserves protection."

In an interview about the Russian NRA conducted by Jason Jay Smart for the Kyiv Post, Ponomarev acknowledged his support of the group while disavowing his own membership, and denied having direct foreknowledge of its actions. Ponomarev's account describes the NRA as being "a network" rather than an organization, which consists of clandestine cells that are compartmentalized and autonomous. He describes the group as having "a slight left-leaning orientation," and that it "embraces social justice, gets rid of oligarchs, and moves away from the new-liberalism approaches of Yeltsin and Putin." Asked about the reaction from fellow exiles and dissidents to his support of partisan activity, Ponomarev claimed to have been disinvited from an opposition meeting.

In a subsequent interview with Spektr, Ponomarev agreed with his interviewer Lev Kadik's characterization of his own role vis-a-vis the NRA as similar to the role of Gerry Adams and Sinn Féin vis-a-vis the Provisional Irish Republican Army (IRA), and claimed that his role is limited to providing publicity, helping fugitives, and providing technical assistance; he denied providing weapons. In addition, Ponomarev offered parallels to the relationship of African National Congress and its armed wing UMkhonto we Sizwe.

==== Criticism and skepticism ====
As of 21 August 2022, The Guardian and Associated Press articles concerning the death of Dugina and its aftermath state that the claim of a National Republican Army responsibility cannot be confirmed.

In an interview with Ponomarev for Meduza, both the interviewer Svetlana Reiter and the editor note skepticism about his claims about the Russian NRA, his accommodations of Putin in his Duma career, and the source of his wealth. Separately, Meduza managing editor Kevin Rothrock questioned Ponomarev's integrity, the existence of the NRA, and implied that both Dugin and Dugina were "civilians" who should not have been targeted.

Sergey Radchenko, the Distinguished Professor at the Henry A. Kissinger Center for Global Affairs at the Johns Hopkins School of Advanced International Studies, told Deutsche Welle he found the claim of responsibility and manifesto to both be "dodgy."

Citing the livestream of Yulia Latynina, Cathy Young mused on the possibility that Ponomarev is "a grifter trying to sell a good story," but noted that the NRA manifesto's appeal to patriotism is not suggestive of black propaganda.

Deutsche Welle's reporter in Kyiv Roman Goncharenko said that "there are more questions than answers" about the group, and noted that the group's purported manifesto employs a call to action "fight like us, fight with us, fight better than us!" (Russian: боритесь как мы, боритесь вместе с нами, боритесь лучше нас!) inspired by the Deutscher Fernsehfunk children's television show Do with us, do as we do, do better than us! that aired in both East Germany and the Soviet Union until 1991.

Asked about the reaction from fellow exiles and dissidents to his support of partisan activity, Ponomarev claimed to have been disinvited from an opposition meeting. This was later specified to be a forthcoming meeting in Vilnius in August 2022, co-organized by prominent liberal dissidents Garry Kasparov and Mikhail Khodorkovsky under the name of the Russian Action Committee (Russian: Российский Комитет Действия). Ponomarev responded by mocking the gathering as the "Committee of Inaction."

==== Congress of People's Deputies ====
Ponomarev is one of the original organizers and Executive Council member of the Congress of People's Deputies, which is a "...transitional parliament established upon the initiative of 59 Russian deputies, of various levels, from the federal to the municipal, to exercise legislative power after the coming final collapse of the regime of Vladimir Putin – who is a usurper of power."

The Congress of People's Deputies met for the first time in Warsaw in November 2022. A second meeting of the Congress was held in Warsaw on 20–23 February 2023. Sessions are to be called quarterly since. In 2025, the Russian FSB accused Ponomaryov of presenting the congress as a 'new Russian government in exile' and charged him with plotting a coup and organizing a terrorist group.

== Personal life ==
Ponomarev is divorced from Kateryna, a journalist. He has a son (born 1995) and a daughter (2000). His mother, Larisa Ponomareva, was an MP in the upper house of Russia's Parliament, the Federation Council, until September 2013, when she was forced to resign following her lone vote against the Dima Yakovlev Law. Ponomarev is a nephew of Boris Ponomarev, Secretary for International Relations of the Communist Party of the Soviet Union. Ponomarev's grandfather Nikolai Ponomarev was the Soviet ambassador to Poland.

On 1 August 2024 Ponomarev's house in Kyiv Oblast was damaged by a Russian drone strike. He and his wife (Note: According to Ukrainska Pravda Ponomarev and his new wife were injured; when reporting about the same attack Obozrevatel did not mention a wife nor others injured.) were injured and hospitalised. Ponomarev claimed this was Russia's fifth assassination attempt "and most successful."
