= Darya Dugina =

Russian journalist and activist (1992–2022)

- Дарья Дугина
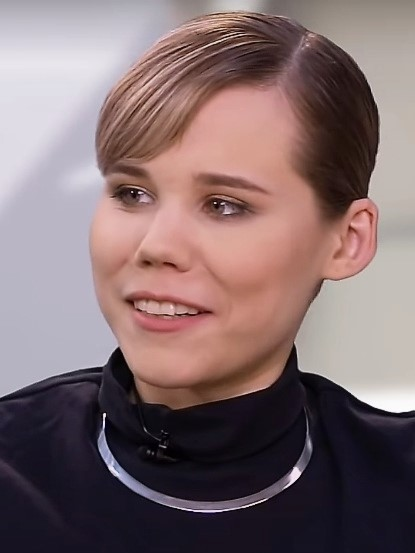
- Dugina in April 2022
- Born: Darya Aleksandrovna Dugina; 15 December 1992; Moscow, Russia
- Died: 20 August 2022 (aged 29); Bolshiye Vyazyomy, Odintsovsky District, Moscow Oblast, Russia
- Cause of death: Car bombing
- Other name: Daria Platonova
- Education: Moscow State University
- Occupations: Activist; journalist; Political scientist
- Parents: Aleksandr Dugin (father); Natalya Melentyeva (mother)
- Awards: Order of Courage (posthumous)

Darya Aleksandrovna Dugina (Russian: Дарья Александровна Дугина; 15 December 1992 – 20 August 2022), also known under the pen name Daria Platonova (Russian: Дарья Платонова), was a Russian journalist, political scientist, and activist. She was the daughter of Aleksandr Dugin, a far-right political philosopher, whose political views and support for Vladimir Putin she shared.

She was killed in August 2022 in a car bombing on the outskirts of Moscow.

== Early life and education ==
Darya Dugina was born on 15 December 1992 in Moscow, Russia. She was the daughter of Aleksandr Dugin and his second wife, philosopher Natalya Melentyeva. In 2012/2013, while studying at Moscow State University, she was an intern at Bordeaux Montaigne University, specializing in Ancient Greek philosophy. Her MSU degree "focused on the political philosophy of late Neo-Platonism". She was in a PhD program, but she left the university before completing her degree.

== Career and activism ==
After university, she worked as a journalist, writing for the state-controlled media outlet RT and the pro-Kremlin conservative channel Tsargrad, using the pen name Daria Platonova. She was affiliated with the International Eurasian Movement, and worked for it as a political commentator.

According to the United States Department of the Treasury, which added her to the Specially Designated Nationals and Blocked Persons List on 3 March 2022, she was the chief editor of a disinformation website called United World International which states it was owned by Putin ally Yevgeny Prigozhin, who also controlled the state-backed Wagner Group. At the same time, she served as a press secretary of her father.

=== Russian invasion of Ukraine ===
Dugina was an outspoken supporter of the Russian invasion of Ukraine. In particular, she claimed that the war crimes against Ukrainian civilians by the Russian army during the invasion were staged. She mentioned that the war in Ukraine "serves to break the bridges of interaction between Russia and Europe, a struggle between two worldviews." In June 2022, she visited occupied Donetsk and Mariupol.

Dugina visited the Azovstal plant in Mariupol, where she collaborated with British journalist Graham Phillips, who also worked for Russian state media. On 4 July 2022, she was sanctioned by the British government, which accused her of being a "frequent and high-profile contributor of disinformation in relation to Ukraine and the Russian invasion of Ukraine on various online platforms." She responded by saying that she is an ordinary journalist and should not have been sanctioned.

== Killing ==
Killing of Darya Dugina
- Location: 55°37′48″N 36°59′06″E; Bolshiye Vyazyomy, Odintsovsky District, Moscow Oblast, Russia
- Date: 20 August 2022; 4 years ago c. 21:45 (MSK)
- Target: Aleksandr Dugin, or Darya Dugina, or both
- Attack type: Car bomb
- Perpetrators: Disputed: (Russia) National Republican Army (Note: own claim); Ukraine (Note: US intelligence assessment); SBU (Note: Russian claim); FSB (Note: claim by Oleksiy Danilov)

Dugina was killed on 20 August 2022, when her car exploded on Mozhayskoye Highway in the settlement of Bolshiye Vyazyomy outside Moscow around 21:45 local time. She was driving to Moscow after attending the annual festival "Tradition", which describes itself as a family festival for art lovers.

The "Tradition" festival is held at the Zakharovo estate, approximately one kilometre (1/2 mi) north of Bolshiye Vyazyomy. Investigators said an explosive device was attached to the underside of the car. It is unclear whether she was targeted deliberately, or whether her father, who had been expected to travel with her but switched to another car at the last minute, was the intended target, or whether the intention might have been to kill both.

=== Investigation ===
On 22 August, the Russian Federal Security Service (FSB) claimed that Ukrainian special services were behind the killing, alleging that their primary suspect was Natalia Vovk, a middle-aged female Ukrainian national who escaped to Estonia after the explosion. The suspect's relatives said that she was a former clerk in the National Guard of Ukraine. According to the FSB, after arriving with her daughter in Russia the previous month the Ukrainian rented an apartment in the building where Dugina lived, and she was at the festival which Dugina attended before being killed. The FSB also released surveillance footage from cameras at the entrance of the apartment building and at the border crossing points, purportedly showing the suspect, and said that she drove a Mini Cooper. The FSB alleged that she used a license plate from the Donetsk People's Republic, then switched to a plate from Kazakhstan and then used a plate from Ukraine to cross the border to Estonia.

Interfax later reported that the FSB named an accomplice, a middle-aged male Ukrainian national, as providing logistical assistance to the primary assassin. Specifically, the FSB alleged that the accomplice provided the primary suspect with their false license plates and a Kazakhstani passport, and assisted in bomb assembly while in Russia. The FSB further alleged that the accomplice had also escaped to Estonia. The name of the alleged accomplice was released by FSB on 29 August 2022.

The later Interfax report elaborated the FSB assertion, that the primary assassin tailed Dugina in the parking lot for guests at the "Tradition", followed Dugina's Land Cruiser in her own Mini Cooper, and detonated the bomb via remote control. It has been impossible to independently verify any of the claims made by the FSB, as Russia has partially criminalized disagreement with the official narrative of the killing and the war in Ukraine in general, and has made independent verification more difficult.

On 23 October 2023, The Washington Post reported that the Security Service of Ukraine (SBU) had carried out dozens of assassinations in Russia since the invasion began, including the bomb attack that killed Darya Dugina, which Ukraine had previously denied. Ukrainian Natalia Vovk, whose name appeared in the reports of Russian law enforcement officers, imported components of an explosive device into Russia in a cat carrier. The CIA did not comment on the article. The head of the SBU, Vasyl Malyuk, said that all the objectives of his department's operations were completely legitimate.

=== Unofficial versions ===
==== Claim of responsibility from National Republican Army ====
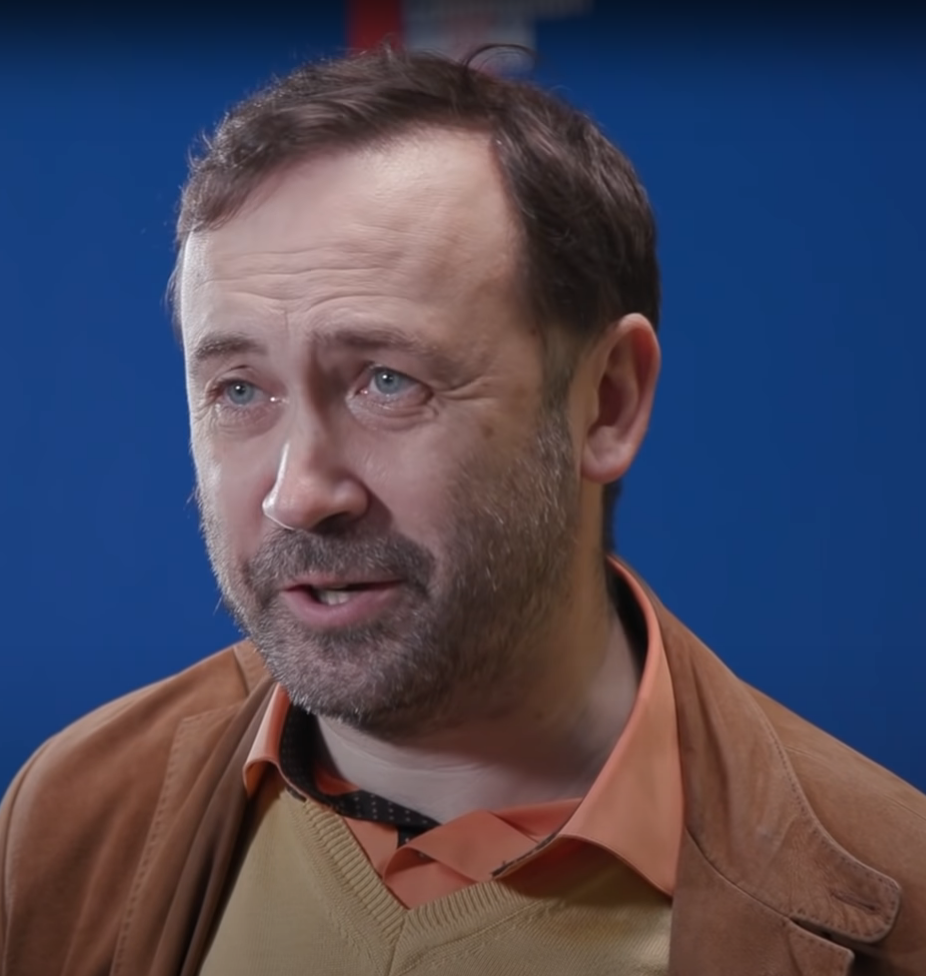
Ponomarev in a 2021 video published by Free Russia Forum

Ilya Ponomarev, a former member of Russia's State Duma living in exile in Ukraine, said that a Russian partisan group was responsible for the attack, and that the hitherto unknown group calls itself the National Republican Army (NRA).

===== Ponomarev's statements about NRA involvement =====
Ponomarev said the NRA is an underground group working inside Russia, dedicated to removing Putin from power. He later said it is a "network" of clandestine cells. Ponomarev told the Kyiv Post the group previously carried out anonymous arson attacks on military induction centers, then shifted to targeting Dugin and Dugina as "something high-profile for which they could become well known". He said that a contact in the group told him a week before the assassination to expect "something big", followed by instructions on the day of the event to "watch the news." Following news coverage of the assassination, Ponomarev said that he was provided evidence of the group's responsibility.

Ponomarev added that his sources believed two persons (i.e., both Dugin and Dugina) were in the targeted car. From Ponomarev's statement, it is unclear whether she was targeted deliberately, or whether her father was the intended target, or whether the intention might have been to kill both. Ponomarev gave a similar account to Radio NV (Ukrainian: Радіо НВ), adding that his contacts "sent certain photos to prove their involvement".

Along with the claim of responsibility for the assassination, Ponomarev aired the organization's manifesto on his media outlet "February Morning" (Russian: Утро Февраля) and hailed it as "a new page in Russian resistance to Putinism. New—but not the last." Later, when confronted with the news of the FSB's accusation of Ukrainian involvement, Ilya Ponomarev told the Meduza news outlet that his purported sources in the National Republican Army deny that the claimed Ukrainian was the perpetrator, while leaving ambiguous whether she may have had a role. In both Meduza and a message to his Telegram channel "Rospartisan" (Russian: Роспартизан), Ponomarev appeared to take credit for her exfiltration from Russia at the request of unnamed "friends". Following his announcement of support for the assassination and the NRA, Ponomarev said that he was disinvited from a planned meeting of Russian dissidents.

===== Scepticism about NRA involvement =====
As of 21 August 2022, Associated Press and The Guardian articles concerning the death of Dugina and its aftermath state that the claim of a National Republican Army responsibility cannot be confirmed. A 22 August 2022 report from Reuters says that "Ponomarev's assertion and the group's existence could not be independently verified."

In an interview with Ponomarev for Meduza, both the interviewer Svetlana Reiter and the editor note skepticism about his claims about the Russian NRA, his accommodations of Putin in his Duma career, and the source of his wealth. Separately, Meduza managing editor Kevin Rothrock questioned Ponomarev's integrity, the existence of the NRA, and implied that both Dugin and Dugina were civilians who should not have been targeted. Citing the livestream of Yulia Latynina, Cathy Young discussed the possibility that Ponomarev is "a grifter trying to sell a good story", but said that the NRA manifesto's appeal to patriotism is not suggestive of black propaganda.

Sergey S. Radchenko, a professor at the Henry A. Kissinger Center for Global Affairs at the Johns Hopkins School of Advanced International Studies, told Deutsche Welle he found the claim of responsibility and manifesto to both be "dodgy." Deutsche Welle's reporter in Kyiv Roman Goncharenko said, "there are more questions than answers" about the group, and noted that the group's purported manifesto employs a call to action "fight like us, fight with us, fight better than us!" (Russian: боритесь как мы, боритесь вместе с нами, боритесь лучше нас!, romanized: borites kak my, borites vmeste s nami, borites luchshe nas!) inspired by the Deutscher Fernsehfunk children's television show Do with us, do as we do, do better than us! that aired in both East Germany and the Soviet Union until 1991.

Matthew Sussex of Australian National University's National Security College wrote that "very few observers believe the hitherto-unknown National Republican Army, which claimed responsibility for the killing, was to blame. But if it were, then it points to the real possibility of organised domestic terrorism in Russia." In The New Yorker, Masha Gessen mused that "either the National Republican Army is a new group using terrorist tactics, and it killed Dugina to show what it's capable of; or this is, in effect, a marketing move, a rush to take credit. In either case—whether the National Republican Army is real or fictional—this version is probably inching closer to the truth."

=== Reactions ===
==== Ukrainian government response ====
The Ukrainian government denied any involvement, with Ukrainian presidential advisor Mykhailo Podolyak stating that "we are not a criminal state like the Russian Federation, much less a terrorist one", and later blaming the killing on infighting between Russian security agencies. While refusing to give comment on the assassination itself, the spokesman for the Chief Directorate of Intelligence of the Ministry of Defence of Ukraine told The Washington Post that "I can say that the process of internal destruction of the 'Russky Mir', or the 'Russian world', has begun", and predicted that "the Russian world will eat and devour itself from the inside."

==== Estonian government response ====
The Minister of Foreign Affairs for Estonia, Urmas Reinsalu, said that the claim that Dugina's assassin fled to safe harbor in Estonia was "[one] provocation in a very long line of provocations by the Russian Federation" and rejected the claim that Dugina's alleged killer had fled to Estonia. Reinsalu and the Ministry urged Estonians to avoid travel to Russia, and advised those on short term travel in Russia to hasten their exit. In statements to The New York Times, law enforcement in Estonia said that Russia had not requested their assistance.

==== US intelligence assessment ====
According to an assessment by the United States Intelligence Community reported by The New York Times on 5 October 2022, officials believe that parts of the Ukrainian government authorized the killing, with some US officials suspecting that Aleksandr Dugin was the intended target, albeit with Darya Dugina also being in the car. American officials also admonished Ukrainian officials over the killing, it reported, and said that they were not aware of the operation.

==== Russian reaction ====
On 21 August 2022, exiled former parliamentarian Ilya Ponomarev, via services read aloud a manifesto of the NRA calling for armed action against the regime and endorsed both the assassination and the manifesto. The following day, the anti-Putin exile group the Russian Action Committee blacklisted Ponomarev from attending the Free Russia Congress on grounds that he had "called for terrorist attacks on Russian territory." The committee's statement also implied that Dugina was a "civilian" who "did not take part in the armed confrontation", and similarly condemned the mockery of Alexandr Dugin following the attack as "a demonstrative rejection of normal human empathy for the families of the victims".

Dugina's father, Aleksandr Dugin, called the killing a "terrorist act executed by the Nazi Ukrainian regime" and wrote that "we need only our victory." Russian president Vladimir Putin sent a message of condolences to the family of Dugina, describing her as a "bright, talented person with a real Russian heart." Putin posthumously awarded Dugina the Order of Courage. The head of the Kremlin-recognized breakaway Donetsk People's Republic, Denis Pushilin, claimed that Ukrainian authorities were behind the explosion.

In the immediate aftermath of the assassination, the United States-government backed Ukrainian news service Svoboda.org gathered various perspectives from Russian-language social media. They included a round-up of reactions from pro-regime figures including former National Bolshevik Party member Zakhar Prilepin blaming Ukrainians (and calling for grenade attacks in reprisal); Aleksey Chadayev blaming Poles; Yegor Kholmogorov, Darya Mitina, Yevgeny Primakov Jr. attributing the death to Westerners in general; and Alexander Ryklin blaming Alexei Navalny.

The same compilation included responses from opponents and critics of Putin. Dmitry Gudkov wrote of the event as a "boomerang" (Russian: бумеранг) for Dugin's warlike rhetoric. Maria Baronova observed that since the outbreak of the "special military operation" assassinations were shifting from cloaked poisonings back to openly violent means, and recalled wry advice from the 1990s to avoid expensive cars. Grigorii Golosov theorized that the attack was meant for Darya Dugina (and not her father) to provide an appealing martyr for anti-Ukraine hawks, though he stressed that he would refrain from guessing whom these hawks are. Alexander Nevzorov wrote that neither Dugin nor Dugina were important, but noted the assassination had created fear among Putin's circles.

==== International reaction ====
On 23 August, United Nations spokesperson Stéphane Dujarric called for an investigation into Dugina's killing. Pope Francis condemned the killing of Darya Dugina, described it as an example of the "madness of war", and called Dugina "an innocent victim". The statement was strongly criticized by the Ukrainian ambassador to the Holy See Andrii Yurash, and the Ukrainian Ministry of Foreign Affairs summoned the Apostolic Nuncio in Ukraine Archbishop Visvaldas Kulbokas for explanations on the issue. In a statement to Vatican News, the Holy See clarified that the Pope's words were to be interpreted as a defense of human life, not as a political defense of Dugina, noting that Francis has repeatedly condemned the Russian invasion of Ukraine.

In The Conversation, Matthew Sussex of Australian National University's National Security College wrote: "any way you cut it, the killing of Darya Dugina brings Putin's own leadership into question. This is something he has scrupulously avoided. He is obsessed with control, and enjoys the support of a massive propaganda machine to turn defeats into triumphs and blame others for his mistakes." In December, historian Harold James compared the death of Darya Dugina with Nazi Germany's killing of the son of Karl Haushofer whose theories had themselves influenced Nazism, "It is likely that the Russian security services were behind the assassination of Dugin's daughter Darya [...] and that they wanted to use the killing both to place the blame on Ukraine and to intimidate Darya's father, who had been criticising Putin from a nationalist perspective."

French magazine Éléments, organ of the ethno-nationalist think tank GRECE, published a lengthy tribute to both. Ideologue Alain de Benoist called Dugina's death "an act of war".

=== Funeral and burial ===
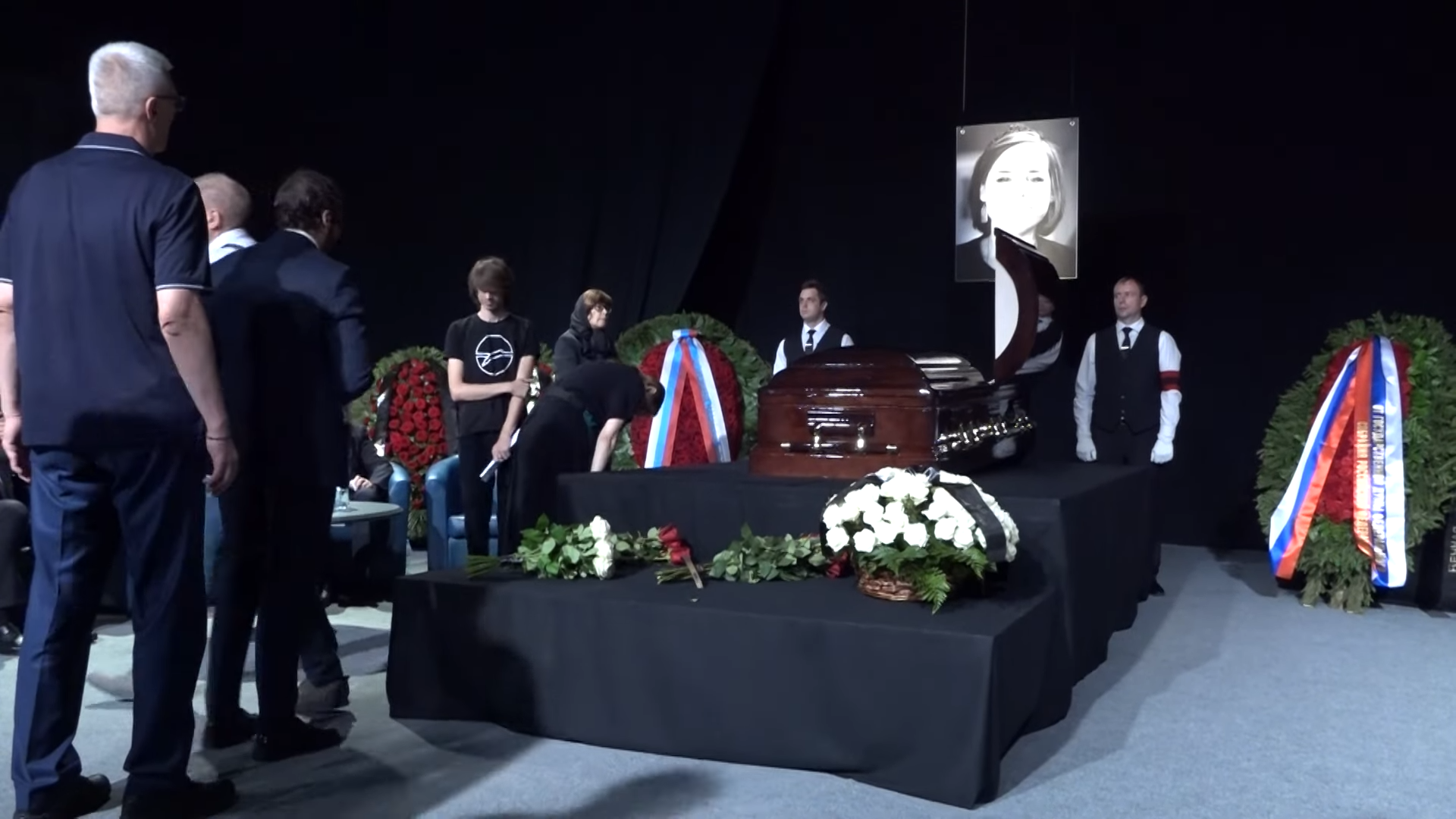
Funeral of Darya Dugina in August 2022

On 23 August 2022, a farewell ceremony for Dugina was held at a TV studio in Moscow's Ostankino Tower, where she was lying in state; it was attended, among others, by far-right party leader Leonid Slutsky, propagandist Dmitry Kiselyov, and "Putin's chef", government and military contractor Yevgeny Prigozhin, leader of A Just Russia — For Truth Sergey Mironov, Deputy Chairman of the State Duma Sergey Neverov, National Bolshevik writer and activist Zakhar Prilepin, the head of the State television Rossiya Segodnya Dmitry Kiselyov, Governor of Khabarovsk Krai Mikhail Degtyarev, ultra-conservative oligarch Konstantin Malofeev and Vladimir Putin's representative Igor Shchyogolev. On the same day, the Russian President Vladimir Putin posthumously awarded her with the Order of Courage for "courage and selflessness shown in the performance of her professional duty".

Dugina's funeral was held in the Church of St Michael the Archangel in Mikhailovskaya Sloboda in Ramensky District of Moscow Oblast; the ceremony was presided by Metropolitan Paul Ponomaryov of Krasnodar and Kuban, who, on behalf of Patriarch Kirill of Moscow, extended his condolences to Aleksandr Dugin and the other relatives. After the funeral services, she was buried next to her grandmother in the village cemetery.

== Books ==
- Eschatological Optimism, Prav Publishing, 2023, 358 pages — ISBN 978-1-952671-78-4
- For a Radical Life, Prav Publishing, 2024, 70 pages — ISBN 978-1-952671-92-0
- A Theory of Europe: A View of the New Right, Arktos Media, 2024. 302 pages — ISBN 978-1-915755-94-0

== See also ==
- Assassination of Vladlen Tatarsky
- List of deaths by car bombing
