= Vehicle registration plates of the Luhansk People's Republic =

The Luhansk People's Republic initiated a system of vehicle registration plates in May 2016. The plates were recognized as valid in the Russian Federation, alongside those of the Donetsk People's Republic, in February 2017.

A standard license plate in the Luhansk People's Republic.

On 21 December 2022 the terms of license plate issuance changed. Russian plates were first issued on that day with the Code 181, after The Luhansk People’s Republic ostensibly became a part of Russia on September 30, 2022 following the unification referendum. Residents with LPR or Ukrainian vehicle registration completed before 14 December 2022 were required to re-register by 1 January 2026 with no extra costs.

== See also ==
- Vehicle registration plates of Russia
- Vehicle registration plates of Ukraine
- Vehicle registration plates of the DPR
