= Anastasia Udaltsova =

Russian politician (born 1978)

Anastasia Udaltsova MP
- Анастасия Удальцова
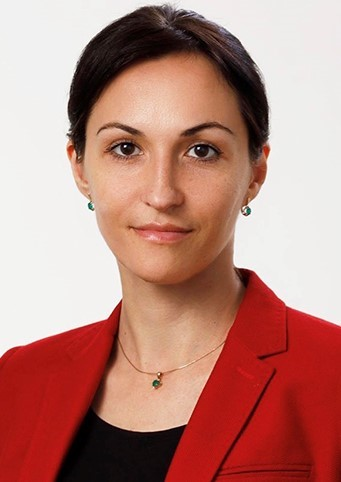
- Official portrait, 2021

Member of the State Duma (Party List Seat)
- In office 29 June 2022 – 30 September 2026
- Preceded by: Valery Rashkin

Personal details
- Born: Anastasia Olegovna Gorban; 2 September 1978 (age 48) Cherkasy, Ukrainian SSR, Soviet Union
- Citizenship: Ukraine (until 1998); Russian (from 1998)
- Party: CPRF; KPU (1997)
- Other political affiliations: Left Front (from 2008); AKM (from 2000); NBP (1998-2000)
- Spouse: Sergei Udaltsov (m. 2001)
- Children: Ivan (b. 2002); Oleg (b. 2006)
- Education: Russian State University for the Humanities; Peoples' Friendship University of Russia
- Occupation: Lawyer
- Website: udaltsova.online (in Russian)

Anastasia Olegovna Udaltsova (née Gorban; Russian: Анастасия Олеговна Удальцова, née Горбань; born 2 September 1978) is a Russian politician who has served as a member of the State Duma since 29 June 2022.

Born in Ukraine, Udaltsova was not a citizen of Russia until 1998, around the time she moved to Moscow and became politically active on the Russian political left. In June 2022, after pressure from the party's grassroots, Communist Party leader Gennady Zyuganov appointed Udaltsova to the State Duma following a vacancy. As a member of the Left Front, she is the only lawmaker to belong to an organisation explicitly opposed to the rule of President Vladimir Putin.

== Biography ==
Before moving to Moscow, she was briefly a member of the Communist Party of Ukraine. She then spent two years in Eduard Limonov's National Bolshevik Party. In 2000, Anastasia met Sergei Udaltsov, coordinator of the Vanguard of Red Youth, whom she married a year later. They have two sons.

After the Left Front was founded in 2008, Udaltsova became its press secretary. She took an active part in the post‑election rallies of 2011, and after Sergei Udaltsov was arrested in the Bolotnaya Square case, Anastasia acted as coordinator of the Left Front.

Since 2013, she has been an assistant to the Communist State Duma member Valery Rashkin. In 2019, she ran for the Moscow City Duma in District 5, supported by Navalny's 'Smart Voting'. Udaltsova was narrowly defeated by the pro‑government candidate, the television presenter Roman Babayan.

In June 2021, she was nominated by the Communist Party for the 8th State Duma of Russia in the Nagatinsky constituency. Her main rival was United Russia's Svetlana Razvorotneva. Despite leading during the three‑day voting period, Udaltsova lost the election after the e‑votes were counted and declared. The media also reported widespread abuse of early voting in favour of the United Russia party.

On 2 June 2022, CPRF leader Gennady Zyuganov announced that Anastasia Udaltsova would be given the seat of Valery Rashkin, who had been stripped of his parliamentary immunity.

In December 2022, the European Union added Anastasia Udaltsova to its sanctions list.

== Personal life ==
Udaltsova was married to Sergei Udaltsov, who served almost five years in prison for his role in protests against President Vladimir Putin.

In October 2023, Udaltsova filed for divorce from her husband. In early December, the court granted the petition, and the decision came into force on 10 January 2024.
