= Vehicle registration plates of the Donetsk People's Republic =

The Donetsk People's Republic (DPR) has issued vehicle registration plates to its residents since 2015, both in its capacity as a self-proclaimed breakaway state from Ukraine, and as an illegally annexed republic of Russia. There are different plates for public transport, private vehicles, and motorcycles, as well as vehicles operated by the republic's self-proclaimed military, police, and government ministries.

== History ==
The first batch of plates were released in May 2015. The original design of the plates, issued from May to December 2015, featured an elongated version of the DPR's flag in the rightmost section of the plate, with its English initials stamped above. That December, the plates were redesigned. The flag and English initials switched places, while the flag was enlarged and its proportions fixed.

The Russian government began to recognize license plates originating from the Donetsk People's Republic and the neighboring Luhansk People's Republic in February 2017, in violation of the Minsk peace accords that it had signed with Ukraine only two years prior. The move was sharply criticized by the Ukrainian government, which warned it helped lay the groundwork for Russia to formally annex the two breakaway republics further down the line.

In 2022, after Russia's illegal annexation of the DPR, its government began issuing Russian-style licence plates to residents of the occupied territory. Plates with a regional code of 80 are designated for trailers and motorcycles, while all other vehicles are issued plates with a regional code of 180. On September 4, 2025, residents of the DPR were warned to stop using their Ukrainian license plates and replace them with Russian ones, or face a fine and a ban from driving their vehicles for up to three months.

DPR license plate, May - December 2015 design

DPR license plate, December 2015 - 2022 design

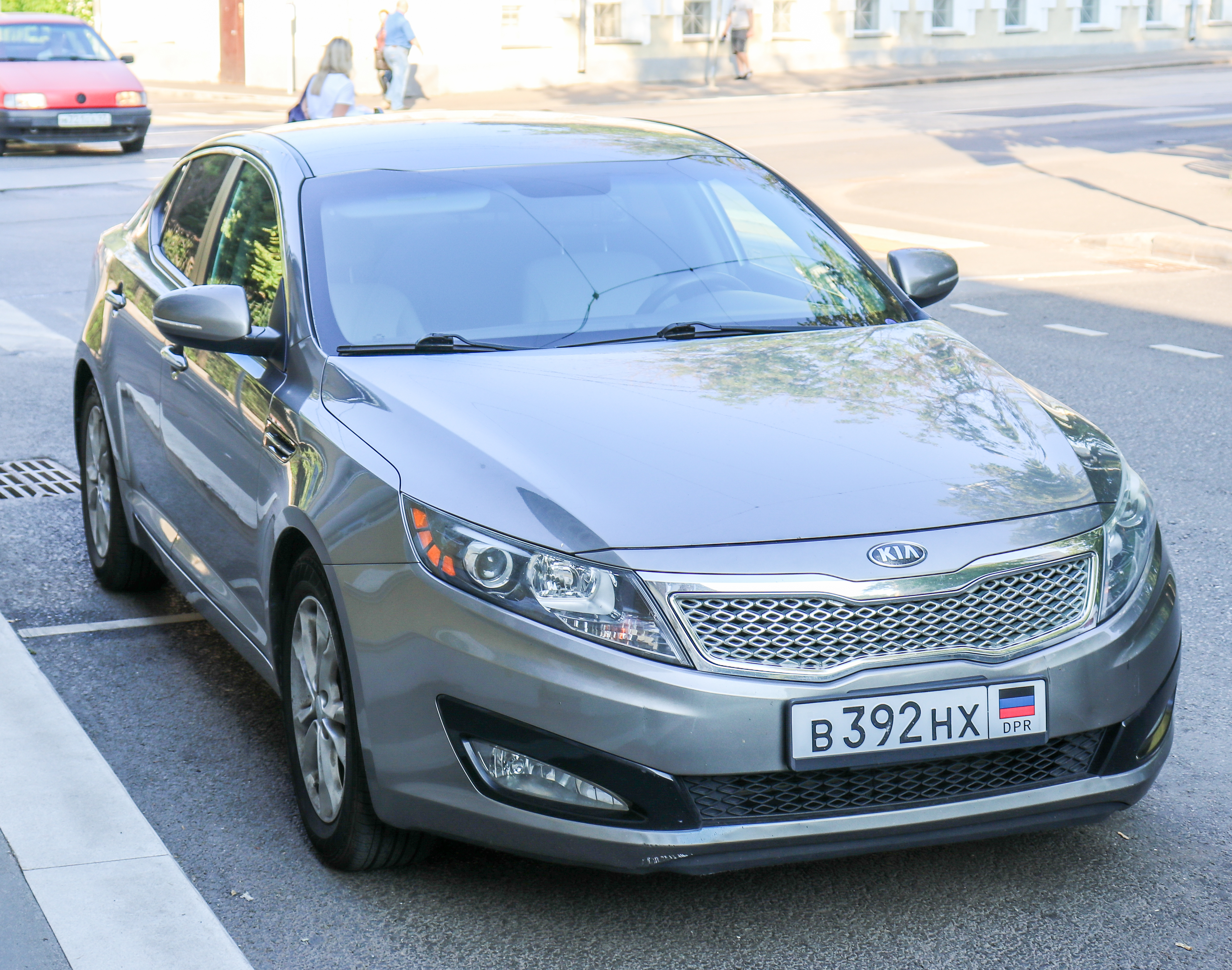
A Kia Optima with a DPR license plate

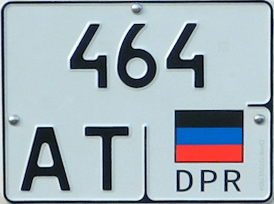
Trailer Plates of DPR

== See also ==
- Vehicle registration plates of Russia
- Vehicle registration plates of Ukraine
- Vehicle registration plates of the LPR
