= Givi Targamadze =

Georgian politician

- Born: July 23, 1968 (age 58)
- Occupation: politician
- Known for: Defense and Security Committee Chairman of the Georgian Parliament
- Political party: United National Movement

Givi Targamadze (Georgian: გივი თარგამაძე; born 23 July 1968) is a Georgian politician in the United National Movement. An ally of Mikhail Saakashvili, Targamadze was one of the leaders of the United National Movement and the 2003 Rose Revolution. He served as Defense and Security Committee Chairman of the Georgian Parliament from 2004 to 2010, a period marked by tensions with Russia and a brief 2008 war over the breakaway province of South Ossetia.

On 5 October 2012, the Russian channel NTV aired a documentary titled Anatomy Of A Protest 2, which claimed to show secret footage of Targamadze meeting with Russian opposition activists Sergei Udaltsov and Leonid Razvozzhayev to plot the overthrow of President Vladimir Putin. Targamadze and Udaltsov both claimed that the documentary had been faked.

== Role in "color revolutions" ==
He is closely allied with President Mikhail Saakashvili, and in 2003, was one of the leaders of the Rose Revolution which forced the resignation of long-time president Eduard Shevardnadze, allowing Saakashvili to assume the office. He also traveled to Ukraine during the 2004 Orange Revolution, in which Viktor Yushchenko assumed office following an annulled presidential election found to have been fraudulent, and to Kyrgyzstan during the 2005 Tulip Revolution, which overthrew President Askar Akayev. In March 2006, Belarus accused him of a role in "an alleged election-day terror plot aimed at overthrowing the government", a claim the Associated Press described as "widely dismissed as scare tactics".

== Defense and Security Committee Chairman ==
From 2004 to 2009, Targamadze served as Defense and Security Committee Chairman of the Georgian Parliament, during which time he frequently criticized the Russian government and military. In August 2004, Targamadze showed footage to journalists of Russian military forces moving to the border of the disputed territory of South Ossetia, a breakaway Georgian province that had declared independence. He called for a greater Georgian military build-up in response, calling Russian aggression "evidently unavoidable". In March 2005, he urged the Georgian government to develop a plan "to prevent any movement on Georgian territory by Russian servicemen" if Russia failed to withdraw from its two remaining military installations on Georgian territory. In May, following a unanimous vote by the Georgian Parliament to force the closing of the bases by 2006, he warned that Russia would face sanctions followed by more severe measures if it failed to withdraw.

In July 2005, Targamadze accused Russia of "taking a direct part in an internal conflict in Georgia" through as many as 120 military intelligence agents on sabotage missions. In November, Russia initially denied him a visa to travel to St. Petersburg for a Commonwealth of Independent States meeting, causing the Georgian delegation to boycott the gathering. When the Russian State Duma banned Georgian and Moldovan wine imports in April 2006, Targamadze described the decision as "revolting".

In April 2008, when Russia stated that it would consider military action if Georgia came into conflict with South Ossetia and Abkhazia, another breakaway province, Targamadze condemned the statement as "aggressive" and "a direct threat to Georgia". Following an unsuccessful August war in South Ossetia, in which Georgian troops had been quickly repulsed by Russian forces, Targamadze headed negotiations for the release of Georgian prisoners. In November, when Erosi Kitsmarishvili, a former Georgian ambassador to Russia, testified before a parliamentary committee that Georgia had been responsible for the war, Targamadze threw his pen at the man and had to be restrained from attacking him.

Targamadze joined his party in November 2007 in criticizing former defense minister Irakli Okruashvili, who accused Saakashvili of corruption after leaving office. Targamadze described the remarks as a "ploy" by opposition candidate Badri Patarkatsishvili. Later that month, he announced that the government was suspending the broadcasts of pro-opposition television stations Imedi and Kavkasia as part of a state of emergency declared by the president.

== Anatomy Of A Protest 2 ==
On 5 October 2012, Russian pro-government news channel NTV aired a documentary titled Anatomy Of A Protest 2, which accused Russian opposition leader Sergei Udaltsov, Udaltsov's assistant Konstantin Lebedev, and Leonid Razvozzhayev, a parliamentary aide to Russian opposition MP Ilya V. Ponomaryov, of meeting with Targamadze for the purpose of overthrowing Putin. The documentary purported to show a low-quality secret recording of a meeting between Targamadze and Russian activists, which NTV stated had been given to its staff "on the street by a stranger of Georgian nationality". The Investigative Committee of Russia (SK) stated it had found the footage to be genuine, while bloggers debated its validity, stating that at least one fragment of footage was used twice with different voice-overs. Targamadze stated he had not met Udaltsov, and dismissed the video as "propaganda" without further comment. Razvozzhayev attempted to apply for asylum in Kyiv, Ukraine through the United Nations High Commissioner for Refugees, but was allegedly kidnapped and returned to Moscow. Udaltsov, Razvozzhayev, and Lebedev were subsequently charged with plotting riots, carrying a potential ten-year prison sentence.
