= Leonid Razvozzhayev =

Russian left-wing political activist

- Born: Leonid Mikhaylovich Razvozzhayev; 12 June 1973 (age 53); Angarsk, Russian SFSR, Soviet Union
- Occupation: aide to State Duma member Ilya V. Ponomaryov
- Known for: October 2012 alleged kidnapping

Leonid Mikhaylovich Razvozzhayev (Russian: Леони́д Миха́йлович Развозжа́ев; born 12 June 1973 in Angarsk) is a member of the political coalition Left Front and an aide to Ilya Ponomaryov, a member of the Russian Parliament. Razvozzhayev was allegedly kidnapped from Kyiv, Ukraine in October 2012 by Russian security forces.

== Criminal charges ==
Razovzzhayev is an aide to the opposition MP Ilya V. Ponomaryov.

In October 2012, the pro-government news channel NTV aired a documentary titled Anatomy Of A Protest 2, which accused Razvozzhayev of meeting with Sergei Udaltsov (another opposition leader of the Left Front), Georgian politician Givi Targamadze, and Georgian consul to Moldova Mikhail Iashvili for the purpose of discussing strategies of the opposition movement in Russia, its financing schemes, and a plan for overthrowing President Vladimir Putin. The documentary purported to show a low-quality secret recording of a meeting between Targamadze and Russian activists, which NTV stated had been given to its staff "on the street by a stranger of Georgian nationality". The Investigative Committee of Russia (SK) stated it had found the footage to be genuine, while bloggers debated its validity, stating that at least one fragment of footage was used twice with different voice-overs.

Following the broadcast, a SK spokesman stated that the government was considering terrorism charges against Udaltsov on the basis of the video, and Razvozzhayev, Udaltsov, and Konstantin Lebedev, an assistant of Udaltsov's, were charged with "plotting mass disturbances".

== Abduction and trial ==
Razvozzhayev posted to a social media site on 19 October stating that NTV's accusations had been false, and announcing his intention to go into hiding. On 15 October Razvozzhayev fled to Kyiv, Ukraine, where on 19 October he requested asylum from the United Nations High Commissioner for Refugees office. Officials at the office suggested he visit an NGO that gives legal assistance to asylum seekers. Razvozzhayev stated that he would go to the cafeteria, leaving his belongings in the office, but he did not return.

On 21 October, the website Life News caught video of Razvozzhayev leaving a Moscow courthouse, shouting that he had been kidnapped and tortured. Razvozzhayev stated in a later interview that he had been held in a house in handcuffs and legchains for two days, and denied food, water, and bathroom access; he also stated that one of his interrogators had threatened to kill his children if he did not sign a confession. Amnesty International reported that Razvozzhayev was also being denied access to a lawyer of his choice.

An SK spokesman stated that Razvozzhayev had not been abducted, but had turned himself in freely and volunteered a confession of his conspiracy with Udaltsov and Lebedev to cause widespread rioting. The spokesman stated that the torture allegations would be investigated.

Following his arrest, Razvozzhayev was held in Lefortovo Prison in Moscow.

On 24 July 2014 a court in Moscow sentenced Leonid Razvozzhayev and Sergei Udaltsov to 4 1/2 years in a penal camp for organizing the May 2012 protest which ended in violence between the police and demonstrators. He was released in April 2017.

== Reactions ==
United Nations officials stated that they were "deeply concerned about [Razvozzhayev's] disappearance". The US Embassy in Moscow officially expressed concern over the case, calling on Russian officials to "examine the issue carefully", while the European Union urged Ukraine to investigate the alleged kidnapping.

The alleged kidnapping was described by the BBC as causing "outrage among human rights groups". Amnesty International called for Razvozzhayev's allegations of torture and abduction to be "promptly, thoroughly, effectively and independently investigated"; the group also stated that it was considering designating Razvozzhayev as a prisoner of conscience. Human Rights Watch also called for an investigation, stating that "For an asylum seeker to simply vanish while lodging his asylum claims and then reappear in the country he fled is profoundly shocking". The Public Observer Commission, a Russian human rights NGO, met with Razvozzhayev and "expressed grave concerns that Russian authorities were returning to Stalinist methods of suppressing dissent".

In Russia, Vladimir Burmatov, an MP from Putin's United Russia party, called on Razvozzhayev's employer, Ponomaryov, to resign from the State Duma for his association with Razvozzhayev. Anti-corruption activist Alexei Navalny and other opposition figures responded by calling for a freeze on the foreign assets of "the masterminds and perpetrators of the abduction, torture and illegal criminal repression against the opposition". On 27 October, Navalny, Udaltsov, and Ilya Yashin were arrested while attempting to join a Moscow protest on Razvozzhayev's behalf and charged with violating public order.

The alleged abduction also became a political issue in Ukraine, where the interior ministry said that Razvozzhayev appeared to have been abducted by "secret services". The Yulia Tymoshenko Bloc of former prime minister Yulia Tymoshenko accused President Viktor Yanukovych of allowing the alleged kidnapping in exchange for Russian backing in the parliamentary election upcoming on 28 October.
