= Sergei Udaltsov =

Russian left-wing activist (born 1977)

- Сергей Удальцов
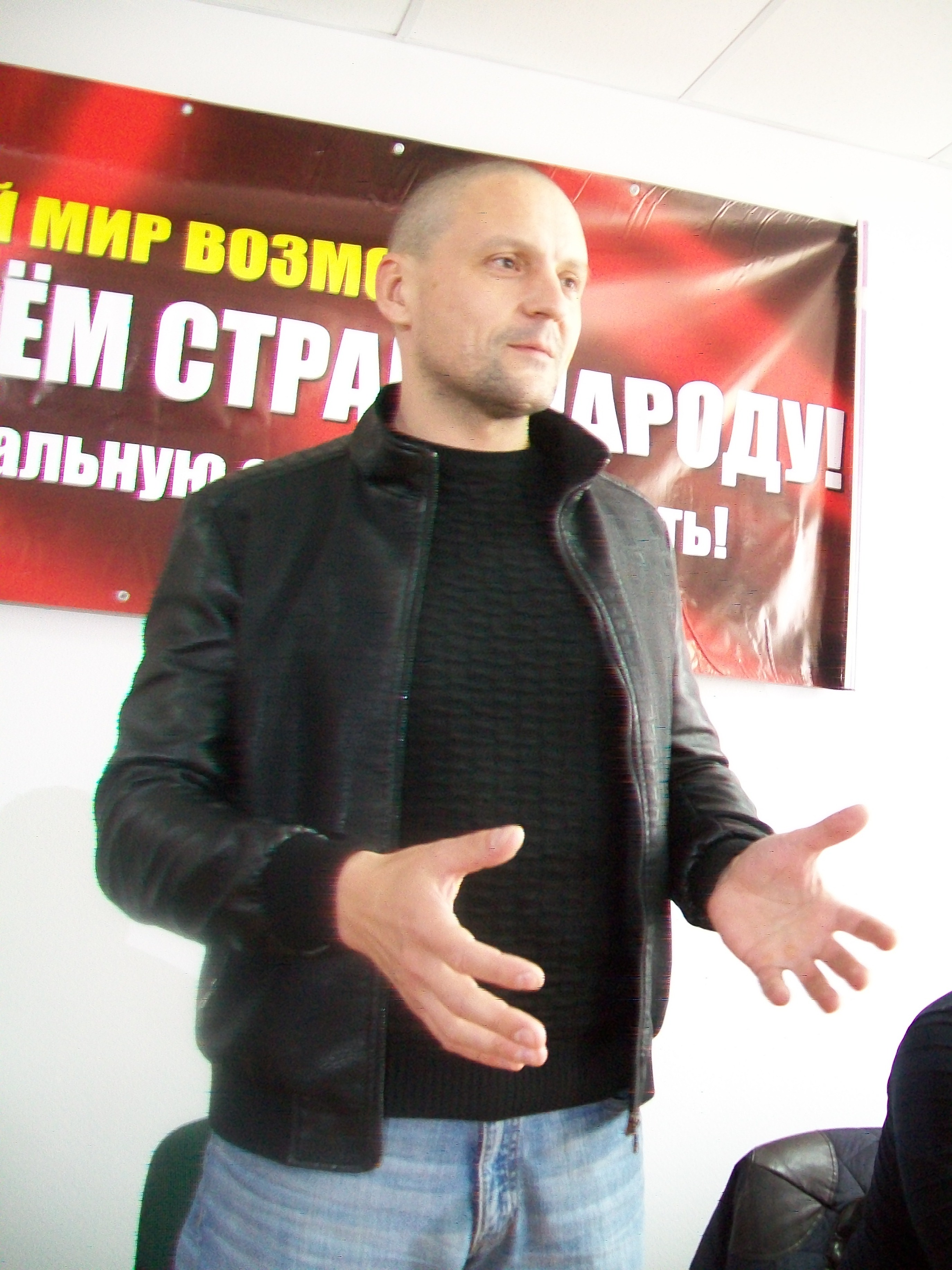
- Udaltsov in 2018

Chairman of the Vanguard of Red Youth
- Incumbent
- Assumed office 4 May 1999

Chairman of the Russian United Labour Front
- Incumbent
- Assumed office 22 February 2010

Personal details
- Born: Sergei Stanislavovich Udaltsov; 16 February 1977 (age 49) Moscow, Russian SFSR, Soviet Union
- Party: Russian United Labour Front; Vanguard of Red Youth; Left Front
- Spouse: Anastasia Udaltsova (m. 2001)
- Children: Ivan (born 2002); Oleg (born 2005)
- Education: Academy of Water Transport
- Profession: Lawyer

Sergei Stanislavovich Udaltsov (Russian: Серге́й Станиславович Удальцов; born 16 February 1977) is a Russian left-wing political activist. He is the unofficial leader of the Vanguard of Red Youth (AKM). In 2011 and 2012, he helped lead a series of protests against Vladimir Putin. In 2014 he was sentenced to 4¹/₂ years in a penal camp for organizing the May 2012 protest which ended in violence between the police and demonstrators.

== Biography ==
=== December 2011 arrest ===
On 4 December 2011, the day of the Russian legislative elections, Udaltsov was arrested in Moscow for allegedly "resisting officers' recommendations to cross the road in the correct place" and detained for five days. As he finished this, Udaltsov was immediately rearrested and given a 15-day sentence for allegedly earlier leaving hospital without permission when he was being treated there during a previous, different period of detention in October. Around twenty officers came to pick him up, together with plainclothes members of the FSB.

Udaltsov was in the same prison as another activist, Alexei Navalny. While in prison, Udaltsov went on hunger strike to protest against the conditions.

In December Amnesty International named him a prisoner of conscience and called for his immediate release. One of Udaltsov's lawyers, Violetta Volkova, applied to the European Court of Human Rights for his release, claiming a list of procedural violations.

As of 17 December 2011, since November 2010 Udaltsov had spent a total of 86 days in detention for a variety of minor crimes and misdemeanours. According to Nikolai Polozov, one of his lawyers, "These cases are fabricated as a deliberate obstacle to prevent Sergei from exercising his constitutional right to free political expression".

=== May 2012 demonstrations ===
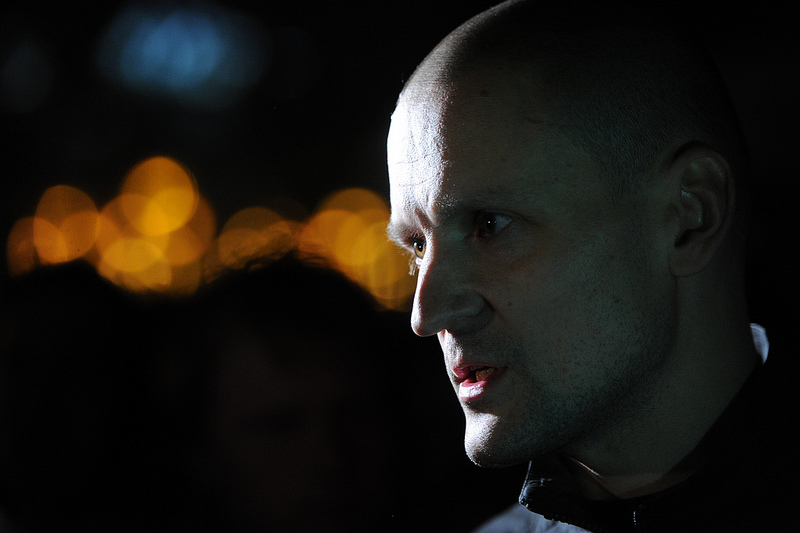
Addressing supporters after release from jail, 24 May 2012

Udaltsov played a leading role in the Moscow demonstrations protesting Putin's inauguration following the presidential election, taking an aggressive approach as the demonstrators attempted to exceed the limits imposed on them by the police. He was arrested, released, then re-arrested at a later demonstration and sentenced to 15 days. Adoption of a more militant posture was a change of tactics for the protest movement, which heretofore had dutifully sought permits and maintained a peaceful atmosphere.

On 8 May, the day after Putin was inaugurated, Udaltsov and fellow opposition leader Alexei Navalny were arrested after an anti-Putin rally at Clean Ponds, and were each given 15-day jail sentences. In response, Amnesty International again designated him (as well as Navalny) a prisoner of conscience.

==== Penal sentence arising ====
On 24 July 2014 a court in Moscow sentenced Udaltsov and his co-defendant Leonid Razvozzhayev to 4 1/2 years in a penal camp for organizing the May 2012 protest which ended in violence between the police and demonstrators. After that Udaltsov has gone on hunger strike to protest the sentence.

Udaltsov was released from prison in August 2017.

=== October 2012 conspiracy charge ===
In October 2012, the pro-government news channel NTV aired a documentary titled "Anatomy of a Protest 2", which accused Udaltsov, Udaltsov's assistant Konstantin Lebedev, and Leonid Razvozzhayev, a parliamentary aide to opposition MP Ilya Ponomarev, of meeting with Georgian politician Givi Targamadze for the purpose of overthrowing Putin. The documentary purported to show a low-quality secret recording of a meeting between Targamadze and Russian activists, which NTV stated had been given to its staff "on the street by a stranger of Georgian nationality". The Investigative Committee of Russia (SK) stated it had found the footage to be genuine, while bloggers debated its validity, stating that at least one fragment of footage was used twice with different voice-overs. Udaltsov denied the documentary's accusations on Twitter, calling it "dirt and lies" and a "provocation whose ultimate objective is to justify my arrest".

Following the broadcast, an SK spokesman stated that the government was considering terrorism charges against Udaltsov on the basis of the video, and Razvozzhayev, Udaltsov, and Konstantin Lebedev, an assistant of Udaltsov's, were charged with "plotting mass disturbances". Udaltsov was arrested by a squad of masked commandos on 17 October. Razvozzhayev fled to Kyiv, Ukraine, to apply for asylum, but was allegedly kidnapped by security forces, returned to Moscow, tortured, and made to sign a confession implicating himself, Udaltsov, and anti-corruption activist Alexei Navalny.

On 26 October, Udaltsov was charged with plotting riots. An SK spokesman also accused him of an attempt "to plan and prepare terrorist acts and other actions threatening the life and health of Russians", and suggested that he could face life imprisonment. The Associated Press described the charges as continuation of "a widespread crackdown on the movement against President Vladimir Putin".

Udaltsov was arrested again on 27 October along with Navalny and Ilya Yashin while attempting to join a protest against Razvozzhayev's alleged kidnapping and torture. The three were charged with violating public order, for which they could be fined up to 30,000 rubles (US$1,000) or given 50 hours of community service.

=== December 2012 arrest in Lubyanka Square ===
Udaltsov and Navalny were among those arrested at a protest in Lubyanka Square on 15 December 2012. According to press reports, about 2,000 protesters had gathered, despite being threatened with huge fines for participating in an unsanctioned demonstration. Russian lawmaker Dmitry Gudkov was quoted as saying, "There is still protest and we want change, and they can't frighten us with detention or pressure or searches or arrests or anything else."

=== 2024 arrest ===
Political repressions against the opposition increased following the Russian invasion of Ukraine (including against some supportive of the war). In January 2024, Udaltsov was arrested and charged for "justifying terrorism" for his support of a Marxist group arrested in Ufa that had been charged with terrorism earlier in 2022. In December 2025, he was convicted and sentenced to six years' imprisonment in a maximum-security penal colony. In response, Udaltsov said he would appeal the ruling and go on a hunger strike.

== Political views ==
Udaltsov served as a campaign manager for Communist Party of the Russian Federation (KPRF) candidate Gennady Zyuganov during the 2012 presidential election. In the 2018 presidential election, he supported the KPRF candidate Pavel Grudinin.

=== Russia ===
In a January 2012 interview, Udaltsov called for "a direct democracy, where the people would have their say through fair and transparent referendums, where they could interact with authorities using the Internet, where they could have a say in social reforms." According to Udaltsov: "We are not nostalgic about the Soviet Union, we do not argue for a return to a centrally planned economy where social initiative was stifled, but we do want to preserve what was good in the Soviet system while adopting new paths to development; we want to see the social-democratic development of Russia."

=== Ukraine ===
Udaltsov is considered to belong to the hardline faction within the Left Front, which has traditionally taken moderate views on foreign interventions. He supports the annexation of Crimea and the "people's republics" of Donetsk and Luhansk in eastern Ukraine. About Crimea's referendum, he declared, "I am a Soviet patriot and consider the destruction of the Soviet Union the greatest mistake and a crime. Therefore, I regard the absorption of Crimea to be a small but important step towards the revival of a renewed [Soviet] Union." In 2017, he explained: "I supported the decision of the citizens of Crimea, as I am confident – I have information from different sources – that it was indeed their decision, the will of the people, to be with Russia. And I, as a man of left, democratic views, cannot contradict it, I cannot oppose it. The Crimeans wanted it. Whether it was right or not, it's their decision. Democracy is democracy".

Udaltsov expressed support for the Russian invasion of Ukraine.

== Personal life ==
Sergei is married to Anastasia Udaltsova. They were known as the "revolutionary couple" of Russian politics in the early 2010s. Together they have two sons, Ivan (born in 2002) and Oleg (born in 2005).

== See also ==
- Vanguard of Red Youth
