= Left Front (Russia) =

Left Front Левый фронт
- Leader: Sergei Udaltsov
- Founders: Sergei Udaltsov; Anastasia Udaltsova; Geydar Dzhemal; Leonid Razvozzhayev
- Founded: 18 October 2008; 18 years ago
- Preceded by: Vanguard of Red Youth
- Headquarters: Moscow
- Newspaper: Ultimatum
- Ideology: Communism
- Political position: Far-left
- National affiliation: Opposition Coordination Council (2012–2013); National Patriotic Forces of Russia (from 2017)
- International affiliation: World Anti-Imperialist Platform
- Colors: Red and black
- Slogan: "Another world is possible!" ("Другой мир возможен!")
- Anthem: "The Internationale"
- Seats in the State Duma: 1 / 450^A Within the CPRF caucus
- Seats in the Federation Council: 0 / 170

Party flag

Website
- www.leftfront.org

The Left Front (Russian: Левый Фронт, romanized: Levyy Front) is a united front of leftist political organizations in Russia in opposition to President Vladimir Putin. It was most active in the early 2010s.

== History ==
The first constituent congress of the Left Front was held on 18 October 2008, in Moscow. The main direction of work after the Congress was using social movements, unions, and labor collectives. The secondary focus of activists has been called "propaganda of action", in which the use of ideas and demands of leftist activists is supposed to be brought to society in the form of direct action, thus attempting to overcome the difficulties of access to media. In addition, the Left Front was the organizer of the annual summer youth camps, schools, political activists, conferences, study groups for the study of socialist thought and practice, film clubs, concerts and other activities.

In total, over one and a half years (summer 2008 – autumn 2009), there have been more than 40 regional conferences, established under the areas of the country offices of the front.

=== History (2010–present) ===
==== 2010–2014: Protest wave and prosecutions ====
In 2011–2012 the Left Front played a visible role in the nationwide "For Fair Elections" protests against electoral fraud and the return of Vladimir Putin to the presidency; coordinator Sergei Udaltsov became one of the movement’s most prominent speakers and was repeatedly detained during this period. In October 2012 the Investigative Committee opened a criminal case against Udaltsov and allies after the state-aligned NTV aired the documentary Anatomy of Protest 2, which alleged contacts with Georgian politician Givi Targamadze; these materials were cited by investigators to launch the case that later became part of the broader Bolotnaya prosecutions. On 24 July 2014 the Moscow City Court found Udaltsov and Leonid Razvozzhayev guilty of "organizing mass disorder" related to the 6 May 2012 Bolotnaya demonstration and sentenced both to four-and-a-half years in a penal colony, a ruling widely described by rights groups as politically motivated.

==== 2017–2019: Return to politics and Moscow City Duma protests ====
Udaltsov was released in August 2017 and announced his return to political activity within the Left Front. During the 2018 presidential election the Left Front and Udaltsov publicly supported Communist Party (CPRF) candidate Pavel Grudinin and co-organized a post-election rally to "take stock of the results." In 2019 Left Front activists took part in the protests around the Moscow City Duma elections; thousands of people were detained during the summer rallies, drawing criticism from international rights groups.

==== 2020s: War era, parliamentary presence and renewed repression ====
Following Russia’s 2022 full-scale invasion of Ukraine, Udaltsov adopted a "left-patriotic" pro-war position while criticizing the authorities for avoiding full economic mobilization; Memorial’s political-prisoners project also notes his public support for the annexation of Crimea. On 29 June 2022 Left Front coordinator Anastasia Udaltsova entered the State Duma as a CPRF party-list deputy, filling a vacancy; she sits with the CPRF faction rather than representing the Left Front as such. On 11 January 2024 Udaltsov was detained and charged under Criminal Code Article 205.2 ("justifying terrorism") over social-media posts; his pre-trial detention was repeatedly extended, he was added to Rosfinmonitoring’s list of "extremists and terrorists" in February 2024, and his trial opened in April 2025.

== Actions ==
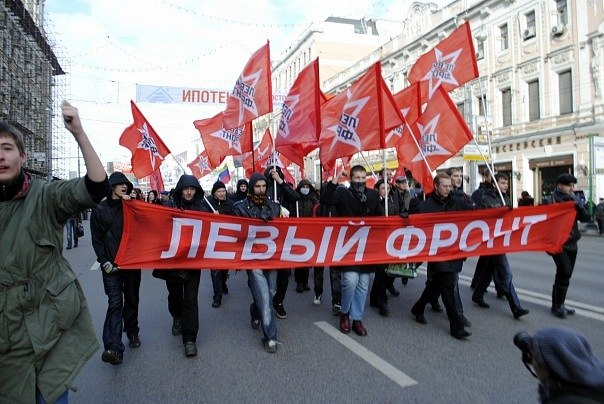
Column Left Front at a demonstration on 7 November 2010

The Left Front organizes a variety of authorized and unauthorized actions, rallies, and marches. The most famous of the promotions are meetings under the title "Day of Wrath", which is hosted by the organization in Moscow and in other regions of the country. In addition, the Left Front, together with its allies, despite a governmental ban conduct actions under the name of "anti-capitalism", which aims, according to organizers, to show the public presence of political forces of anti-capitalist orientation.

== Position on the war in Donbas ==
The Left Front has declared its position against the War in Donbas and urged a ceasefire in 2014.

The fourth congress of the movement took place in Moscow on 23 August 2014. The delegates elected the new executive committee. No supporters of the pro-Russian republics were elected. However, ex-coordinator of the Left Front on organizational work and supporter of the pro-Russian Novorossiya confederation, Sergei Udaltsov, was elected to the executive branch of the movement by one vote. The congress also accepted a resolution declaring a "War against war!". The Donetsk People's Republic's representative to Russia, Darya Mitina, left the organization following the resolution.

The resolution read "We need the campaign for peace. Against the bloodshed and the mass selling of blood. This campaign shouldn't be the support of the war in the back areas of the 'opponent'. Being against the military operation of the Kiev government doesn't mean supporting Putin and Strelkov. Being against Putin doesn't mean supporting Kiev government military operation. People need a campaign for peace against the greedy and cruel politicians and oligarchs, making profit of the others' grief."

The Left Front supported the war against Ukraine after the Russian's full-scale invasion in 2022.

== Structure ==
The highest governing body of the Left Front is the Congress. The Council of the Left Front carries out the current leadership of the movement, and the executive committee is an operational working body of the organization.
