= Vanguard of Red Youth =

Vanguard of Red Youth Авангард красной молодёжи
- Abbreviation: АКМ
- Leader: Sergei Udaltsov
- Founded: 4 May 1999; 27 years ago
- Headquarters: Moscow
- Newspaper: Control Shot; Red Revenge
- Membership (2007): 8,000
- Ideology: Communism; Marxism-Leninism; Bolshevism; Stalinism; Anti-revisionism; Radicalism
- Political position: Far-left
- National affiliation: Labour Russia (1999–2004); Left Front (2008–)
- Colours: Red
- Slogan: "Our Motherland is the USSR!" (Russian: "«Наша Родина — СССР!") "Socialism or death!" (Russian: "Социализм или смерть!") "The future belongs to communism!" (Russian: "Будущее за коммунизмом!")

Party flag

Website
- akm1917.su

The Vanguard of Red Youth (AKM; Russian: Авангард красной молодёжи; Avangard krasnoy molodyozhi, acronymed after an AK-47 variant) is a radical Russian socialist youth group. Its website describes it as an "independent youth organization, entering the all-Russian public political motion." Its "territory of action" is Russia, which it insists is still the heart and soul of "the republic of the USSR." The AKM's ideology is Marxism-Leninism and it formed part of the Left Front, an all alliance of far-left parties. The unofficial leader of the AKM is Sergei Udaltsov (Сергей Удальцов), who has been arrested several times for protesting against Vladimir Putin's regime.

The name of the organization is the backronym of AKM, a model of the well-known Kalashnikov assault rifle family. Its organizational structure uses military terminology: battalion, brigade. Most cities will house an "отделение" or squad of AKM, with several squads forming a battalion. Currently battalions exist in Moscow and St. Petersburg.

The group entered on to the world scene by being the indirect subject of a November 2005 ZMag article dealing with the annual 7 November demonstration commemorating the anniversary of the Bolshevik Revolution, and also addressing the civil unrest in France.

In the article, Boris Kagarlitsky of the Institute for Globalization Studies describes the AKM as "[the] Russian equivalent of [the] Western Black Bloc ... surrounded by the police and strictly controlled."

Kagarlitsky quotes a young AKM radical as shouting: "We will turn Moscow into Paris!" It is unclear how much support the AKM currently has from other organizations in Russia, or whether it truly plans on becoming a vanguard party.

On 3 March 2007, the AKM participated in the Saint Petersburg March of Dissenters, one of the largest opposition demonstrations in recent years. It has also organized dozens of smaller rallies, and has participated in many protests including violent clashes with the police.

In October 2008, the AKM joined the Left Front.

== See also ==
- Communist Party of the Russian Federation
- List of anti-revisionist groups
