= Conflict Zone (news programme) =

Current affairs television programme

Conflict Zone is a TV programme broadcast by German broadcaster Deutsche Welle. Its host is Tim Sebastian, and its format is of a twenty-minute long interview with one guest per episode.

== History ==
In November 2015 Sebastian caused Ukrainian President Petro Poroshenko some grief.

In December 2015 Afghani president Ashraf Ghani revealed in a conversation with Sebastian that "I don’t trust anyone."

In March 2016 Sebastian interviewed Palestinian Prime Minister Rami Hamdallah over his refusal to condemn the stabbing attacks on Jews.

In April 2017 Congress Party of India MP Shashi Tharoor talked about corruption and Kashmir, amongst other subjects with Sebastian.

In May 2017 Sebastian interviewed Ehud Barak, the former Prime Minister of Israel.

In April 2018, former Taoiseach Bertie Ahern walked out of an interview with Sebastian over the Mahon Tribunal questions posed by the latter.

In March 2019, Spanish Foreign Minister Josep Borrell walked out on an interview when he took issue with Sebastian, who had accused him of lying.

In October 2020 while the country was in an uproar, Sebastian had Denitsa Sacheva, Bulgaria's Labor and Social Policy minister on his show to discuss protests over a corruption scandal.

On 26 June 2021, Carlos Ghosn walked out of a Conflict Zone interview.

In February 2022, Sebastian interviewed Democratic Unionist Party of Ireland MP Sammy Wilson, who maintained that "The EU has used and abused Northern Ireland".
