= Tim Sebastian =

English television journalist

- Born: 13 March 1952 (age 74); London, England, United Kingdom
- Education: New College, Oxford; Cardiff University
- Occupations: Television journalist; novelist
- Notable credits: Reuters; BBC; Bloomberg; DW
- Children: 1

Tim Sebastian (born 13 March 1952) is an English television journalist and novelist. He is the moderator of Conflict Zone and New Arab Debates on Deutsche Welle. He previously worked for the BBC, where he hosted Doha Debates and was the first presenter of HARDtalk. Sebastian also presented Bloomberg TV's The Outsider, an India-focused debating programme.

He won the Richard Dimbleby Award from the British Academy of Film and Television Arts in 1981, and was twice designated Royal Television Society Interviewer of the Year in the United Kingdom — once in 2000 and again in 2001.

== Early life and education ==
Sebastian was born in London, England. He was educated at Westminster School, a fee-paying independent school in Central London. He holds a BA degree in Modern Languages from New College, Oxford and speaks both German and Russian. He has a Diploma in Journalism Studies from Cardiff University, graduating in 1974.

== Journalist career ==
Sebastian began his journalism career at Reuters in 1974, moving to the BBC as foreign correspondent in Warsaw in 1979. He became BBC's Europe correspondent in 1982. At that time in 1983 in Wrocław, during Martial law in Poland, Tim Sebastian interviewed Kornel Morawiecki, the leader of the Polish anti-Soviet and anti-communist underground organization Fighting Solidarity, hiding from the Polish security service.

Between 1984 and 1985 (until his expulsion from the USSR in 1985) he was BBC's correspondent for Moscow; he then reported from Washington between 1986 and 1989.

Sebastian has worked for The Mail on Sunday, and has contributed to The Sunday Times.

== Television hosting ==
Sebastian was the original presenter of HARDtalk when the programme launched in March 1997. He hosted the show till March 2007. Hard Talk had many notable interviews with world leaders, including US Presidents Bill Clinton Donald Trump and Jimmy Carter, Archbishop Desmond Tutu, Singapore's first Prime Minister Lee Kuan Yew, and the last leader of the Soviet Union Mikhail Gorbachev. He currently hosts Conflict Zone, a one-on-one interview show on Deutsche Welle's international English-language channel.

=== Debate moderator ===
Sebastian is a frequent moderator of major conferences, seminars and forums across the globe.

He was the chairman of The Doha Debates, a Qatar Foundation programme that was broadcast monthly on BBC World News where it was the highest-rated weekend programme. The Debates were founded by Sebastian in 2004 and their fifth series began in September 2008.

Following the political and social unrest in Egypt and Tunisia in early 2011, Tim Sebastian founded The New Arab Debates, which have been held in Egypt, Tunisia and Jordan and were broadcast on Deutsche Welle English as well as regional television channels. The debates are also held in Arabic and hosted by Egyptian TV presenter Mai El Sherbiny.

== Awards ==
In 1982, Sebastian was awarded the British Academy of Film and Television Arts Richard Dimbleby Award and was named Television Journalist of the Year by the Royal Television Society. Additionally he has twice won the Royal Television Society's Interviewer of the Year Award for his HARDtalk interviews.

== Personal life ==
His daughter is CNN journalist Clare Sebastian.

== Bibliography ==
=== Non-fiction ===
- Nice Promises: Tim Sebastian in Poland (1985)
- I Spy in Russia (1986)

=== Novels ===
- The Spy in Question (1988)
- Spy Shadow (1989)
- Saviour's Gate (1991)
- Exit Berlin (1992)
- The Memory Church (1993)
- Last Rights (1993)
- Special Relations (1994)
- War Dance (1995)
- Ultra (1997)
