= Maria Baronova =

Russian chemist

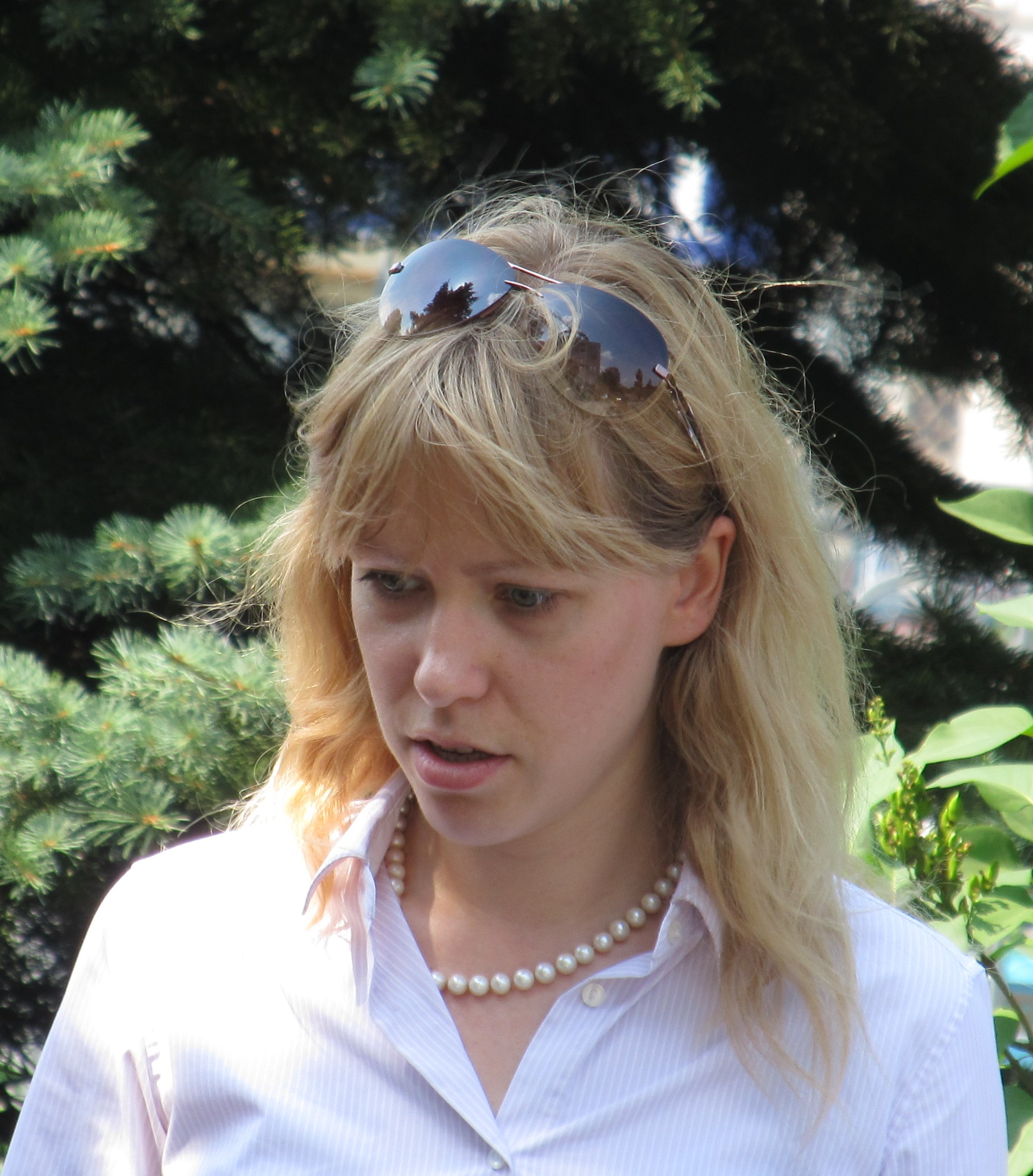
Baronova in 2013

Maria Nikolayevna Baronova (Russian: Мария Николаевна Баронова; born April 13, 1984) is a Russian chemist who has worked as a sales manager of lab equipment, journalist, and political spokesperson. She is known as an activist opposing President Vladimir Putin and, in particular, for having organized the Bolotnaya Square protests on May 6, 2012. In February 2019, she joined Russian government television network RT to work on a charity project.

== Early life and education ==
Baronova (née Tchebotareva) describes herself as having been born in “Orwell's year,” 1984. The Hez family consisted mostly of politically inactive members who never partook in activism. She was raised by her mother, who was “a theoretical physicist turned actuary.”

During the economic downturn of the 1990s, Baronova's mother was destitute. She told Rolling Stone that her family began growing its own vegetables at their grandparents' home and stored them for winter. Her mother died of breast cancer when Baronova was 18, and six months later Baronova, who at the time was studying chemistry at Moscow University, took a job selling laboratory equipment. Later she worked as a sales manager for a chemical distributor.

== Activism ==
For two months during the presidency of Dmitry Medvedev, she worked as business manager, assistant, press secretary, and spokeswoman for Ilya Ponomarev, a member of the Duma, the lower house of the Russian Parliament. Ponomarev was a leading figure in the Just Russia party as well as in the opposition movement. When police later searched her apartment, Baronova said that she believed the searches were motivated by her association with Ponomarev, while he suggested that the purpose of the searches was to locate evidence against him.

It was while she was working for Ponomarev that Baronova grew to oppose Medvedev and became an activist. “I think most of us who came out [and became opposition activists] were tired,” she said. She accused the leading party of operating a corrupt system using kickbacks and bribes that enriched a few at the expense of the country as a whole. The incident that triggered her turn to activism occurred during the parliamentary elections of December 2011. She witnessed and tried to report an electoral violation but, as she put it, was “thwarted.” The next day, she took part in a protest rally, which marked the start of her life as an activist.

She began passing out leaflets, holding interviews with the press, and staging one-person protests that resulted in several detentions, according to Masha Gessen. “Thanks to her charisma, Baronova quickly became a celebrity of the anti-Putin movement,” observed The Daily Beast. Beginning in December 2011, she served as the opposition movement's volunteer spokeswoman. For a time she was one of the most well-known protesters in Moscow. She appeared on a calendar of “12 Dissident Women.”

=== Bolotnaya Square protests ===
On the morning of May 6, 2012, Baronova was detained by police at the Zakonospassky monastery, where “she had asked a priest to say a prayer in support of her friends, the three jailed members of the Pussy Riot band.” Released within hours, she organized an instantaneous protest in Bolotnaya Square that devolved into “a police riot, mass detentions, and beatings.” Enraged at the brutality of police officers during the demonstration, she yelled at them: “You violated your oath just as badly as your tsar did!” Facing a line of soldiers, she recited to them Article 31 of the Russian Constitution, which guarantees freedom of assembly.

After the protests, authorities threatened to charge Baronova with “organizing disorders,” but she was ultimately charged with the lesser offense of “inciting disorders.” Instead of imprisoning her like other defendants in the Bolotnaya Square case, the Investigative Committee of the Russian Federation released her on the understanding that she would not leave Moscow. State guardianship agents threatened to take away her son. In June 2012, after being formally charged with inciting a riot, she told Masha Gessen that she had been busy “reassuring people,” explaining that it was “like when a loved one dies: you have to let everyone know that things on the inside are not quite as horrible as they seem from the outside.”

=== Household raid ===
Five weeks after the Bolotnaya Square protests, while Baronova and her son were not at home, agents of the Investigative Committee, Russia's domestic intelligence and security service (comparable to FBI) , forced her son's babysitter to open the door and raided it, carrying assault rifles. They restrained her son's nanny to the floor and searched the flat, writing out a seizure order that Baronov later laughed at because, she said, it read “like a parody of Orwell or Kafka.” The order read in part: “In the righthand corner of a shoe box, located to the right of the entryway, 86 stickers were found and confiscated with the words, ‘In what kind of Russia shall we live? One of fairness, freedom and justice.'” The order also listed “two books, four laptops, a protest organizer's badge, 31 copies of the opposition newspaper Grazhdanin (Citizen), and exactly 15 'strips of white material 36 cm in length.'” (The symbol of the protest movement is a white ribbon.) Searches were also conducted at other opposition leaders’ apartments.

In addition, the agents confiscated family photos, protest buttons, “several booklets about Putin and a DVD of an anti-Putin movie,” as well as “a pin with a pink triangle, a symbol of gay rights activism.” They even took items of personal hygiene, a medical inhaler, and “ultrasound images from Baranova's pregnancy.” Apropos of the confiscation of the ultrasound images, Baronova said that she asked them: “do you think my child was planning unrest?” She later said that she found the entire seizure order funny, and that later, when she was interrogated, she found that procedure funny too, until she learned that she faced a charge of inciting a riot, the most serious charge yet leveled against any Bolotnaya Square protester.

=== Later developments ===
Baronova told Time magazine in June 2012 that "at a certain point, an activist is more useful to the cause from behind bars. ... So if it's my time to go, I'll go." In summer 2012, she received anonymous phone calls telling her "You will die in three weeks" and "We know that you have moved to a new place, but you won't get away from us." In August 2012, Baronova accused the police of provoking the violence at Bolotnaya Square, and said that Putin was out for vengeance. "We spoiled his holiday and now he is spoiling our lives", she said.

Prohibited from leaving Moscow, she was kept under watch by the authorities, who after their search of her flat repeatedly entered it again when she was out, moving furniture around and turning on her stove, which are reportedly "commonplace scare tactics". She has said that she tried to deal with this harassment by pretending that nothing was going on. “That's the only way to get used to it,” she said. "Pretend that no one wrote notes on my door threatening to kill me and my son." She also received anonymous text messages threatening to kill her and Sasha. Also, her grandfather accused her of working clandestinely for the U.S. State Department, "Russia's worst enemy".

During the months after the Bolotnaya Square protests, Boronova was also interrogated at length several times by a special investigative unit. In addition, she was reportedly spied on by social-service workers who issued “a thinly veiled threat that her son might be taken away from her.” In late June, she received a visit from representatives of social services and was told that a complaint had been made about her parenting of Sasha. Searching her flat, the social-service workers “asked why she had English-language books, why there were cigarettes on the kitchen table, whether the violin aligned with sanitary norms.” Commenting later on these questions, Boronova later said: “That's when I realised I'm in a nuthouse.” Prohibited from leaving Moscow, she continued to be active in protest, feeling that her organizing skills “could help to bring down the power of crooks and thieves.” In July 2012, for example, she helped establish a donation drive after 170 people died in a flood in the town of Krymsk.

In a November 2012 Facebook posting, Baronova expressed her anguish over the injuries and prison sentences her fellow activists were receiving for their commitment. She stated that she saw “no more sense” in keeping on with the protests. The Daily Beast commented that Baronova, once "a young rising star of Russia's anti-Putin activist movement", was now unsure as to whether she wanted to continue pursuing activism. Controversially, moreover, she criticized some of her fellow opposition figures. "At one point", she has said, "I suddenly got the impression that one-third of the opposition movement was made up of not particularly clever people, another one-third of Kremlin agents and the final third of simply crazy folks." She has said that "half of the country ... believes all that idiocy about how Russia is a strong, great power and America hates us and how we need to conquer and defeat everyone.” She has affirmed that “we need to go on protests, but we need to do something more, as well. Russians never carry things through until the end. It's a genetic and psychological peculiarity, I guess."

In December 2013, Baronova and several other opposition figures, including Mikhail Khodorkovsky and the Pussy Riot punk-rock group, were amnestied. While Khodorkovsky and the Pussy Riot members were able to travel around the world and to speak about the situation in their homeland, Baronova could not leave Russia. She was unable to secure an EU visa because her name appeared on a Russian police database as a result of her case. “She fought for 'Western values,' Baronova says, and now the West is punishing her for it,” reported Reuters. In an interview after her amnesty, she expressed hostility toward some of her fellow activists and suggested sarcastically that perhaps “the best place to live” was the planet Mars. “On the other hand, maybe because of this insanity, things will be reformed in the next 20 years, who knows.” Baronova has said that it would be a “moral crime” to flee Russia. But she has also expressed the wish to study abroad for a Ph.D.

Julia Ioffe of The New Republic reported on February 5, 2014, that Baronova was now working as a science correspondent for Dozhd (“Rain”), the last independent Russian TV channel. “It is the only work that she, a chemist and once a well-paid sales manager at a chemical-supplies company, could get after becoming a defendant in such a public, politicised trial,” explained Ioffe. Shortly thereafter, Baronova wrote an article, entitled “No One Has Done More for Ukrainian Nationalism than Vladimir Putin,” that appeared in The New Republic's issue of March 3, 2014. In the article, Baronova described the then-ongoing war in Crimea as “the strangest war I've seen in my 30 years,” and dubbed it Phoney War 2.0, a reference to the so-called “Phoney War” from September 3, 1939, to May 10, 1940. She added that while Putin was being compared widely to Hitler, he was in fact “closer to Stalin.”

In 2016, she unsuccessfully ran as a candidate for Duma. She was not supported by a registered political party, but rather by the Open Russia organization.

In February 2019, she joined Russian government television network RT to work on a charity project called "DDBM".

In early March 2022, Baronova resigned from Russia Today after she condemned the 2022 Russian invasion of Ukraine saying "The problem is, I know these people very well. They never send threats, they just kill, so there is kind of [a] weird silence around me, but I really think we're on the brink of a nuclear war right now. I'm not exaggerating." In 2024, she blamed Ukrainians for the war, berating them for "shitting on the helping hand held out by anti-war Russians when Putin started retaliating against your shit and when your bastard Azov gang started taking hostages."

== Reception ==
Several publications, including The New Republic and Rolling Stone magazine, have praised her activist work and fortitude in supporting Russia's opposition movement. Reuters journalist Lucian Kim described her as embodying "the contradictions of Russians who love their country, warts and all, and seek to reconcile it with the rest of the world."
