= Vehicle registration plates of Ukraine =

Ukraine
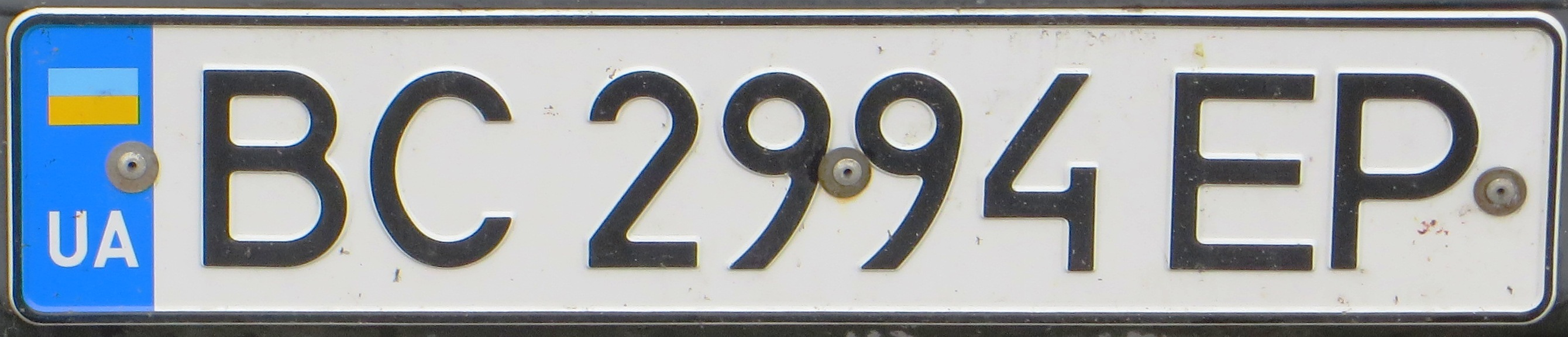
- Ukrainian regular legal standard number plate.
- Country: Ukraine
- Country code: UA

Current series
- Size: 520 mm × 110 mm 20.5 in × 4.3 in
- Serial format: AB 1234 BC (AB being the regional code)
- Colour (front): Black on white
- Colour (rear): Black on white

Ukrainian implementation of a format similar to the EU format. Both the EU format and the Ukrainian format satisfy the Vienna Convention on Road Traffic.

Since the declaration of Ukraine's independence in 1991, the country has used four main systems of vehicle registration plates.

The first system was introduced in 1992. Its design was based on the 1977 Soviet license plate design standard, which was still in widespread use when the USSR collapsed. However, a new regional suffix was added, corresponding to a Ukrainian province.

In 1993, the left-hand side of the plate was modified with the addition of the national flag over the country code "UA".

1995 saw the introduction of a completely new system consisting of five digits, with a dash between the third and fourth digit, combined with a two letter suffix. It also included a two-digit region code, situated under the National Flag on the left-hand side of the plate.

In order to enable drivers to their vehicle abroad, and in order to adhere to the Vienna Convention on Road Traffic, regular Ukrainian license plates only use Cyrillic characters with glyphs that resemble a letter from the Roman alphabet. (These characters are: А, В, Е, І, К, М, Н, О, Р, С, Т, and Х). Before 1995, the "Я" character was also used. Cyrillic characters that have no resemblance to any Roman alphabet character can still be used for some types of black-background plates.

Some vehicles, like trolleybuses, are not required to have license plates, because they cannot leave the network they operate on and can be identified by a number painted on the vehicle and assigned to it by the local public transport authority.

== Previous series ==
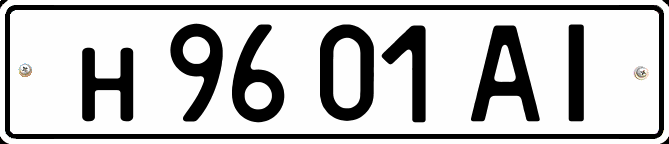
1991–1993 series (AI denotes Luhansk Oblast)

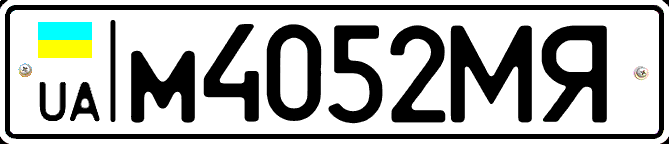
1993–1995 series (МЯ denotes Autonomous Republic of Crimea)

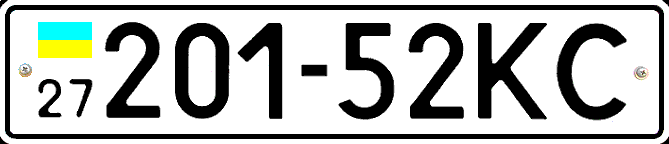
1995–2004 series (27 denotes Sevastopol)

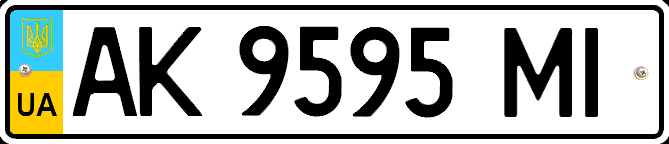
2004–2015 series (AK denotes Autonomous Republic of Crimea)

An old photo chronicle conveys the presence of license plates on vehicles from Kyiv during the Ukrainian People's Republic. The license plates had a letter prefix, a dash and three numbers (i.e. "A-123"). They had a light background and dark letters.

Between 1977 and 1993, Ukrainian registration plates were manufactured in accordance with the Soviet GOST 3207-77 standard. The alphanumeric sequence took the form of: x #### XX, where x is a lowercase Cyrillic serial/counter letter; # is any digit in the range 0–9; and XX are two uppercase Cyrillic letters indicating where the vehicle was first registered.

OK, OH, OC and OX used on registered vehicles driven in foreign countries.

=== Old region identifiers ===
Suffix	Region
BГ	Luhansk
BИ	Vinnytsia
BH	Volyn
ДH, ДП	Dnipropetrovsk
ДO, ДЦ	Donetsk
ЖБ, ЖЖ, ЖИ	Zhytomyr
ЗA, ЗH	Zakarpattia
ЗП	Zaporizhzhia
ИФ	Ivano-Frankivsk
ЛB	Lviv
КД	Kirovohrad
КИ, XT	Kyiv city
КP	Crimea
КX	Kyiv
HИ	Mykolaiv
ОД	Odesa
ПO	Poltava
PB	Rivne
CУ	Sumy
TE	Ternopil
XA, XK	Kharkiv
XM	Khmelnytskyi
XO	Kherson
ЧB	Chernihiv
ЧK	Cherkasy
ЧH	Chernivtsi

== Current 2015 plates ==
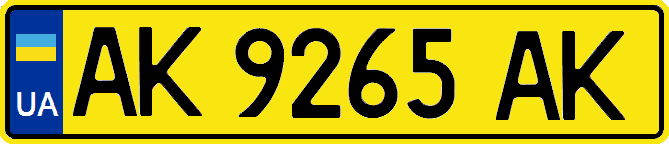
2015 Public transport plate

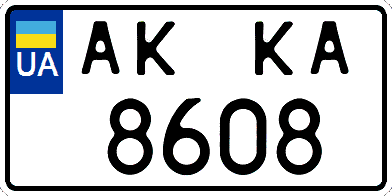
2015 Two-line optimized plate

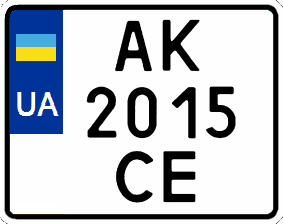
2015 Three-line motorcycle plate
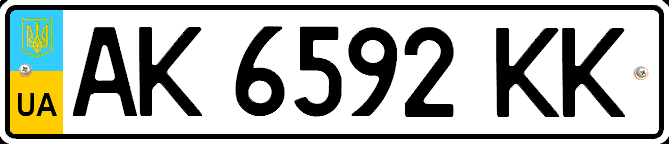
2004 Regular plate

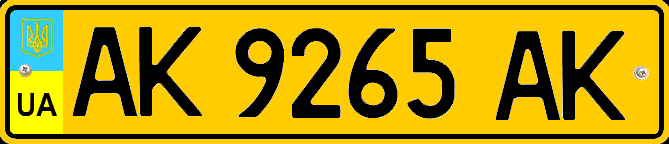
2004 Public transport plate

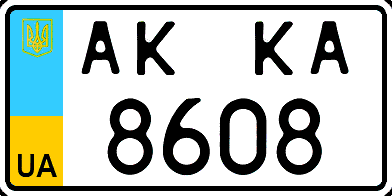
2004 Two-line optimized plate

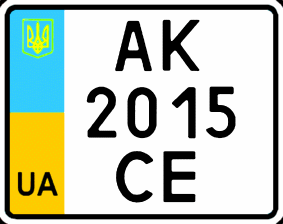
2004 Three-line motorcycle plate

Current plates include a two-letter regional prefix, followed by 4 digits and a two-letter serial suffix.

The international vehicle registration code UA is situated in a national-flag-colored band on the left edge of the plate. The band also features the nation's coat of arms.

The size of a standard single-line license plate is 520 mm by 112 mm. Two-line optimized-by-size license plates may be shaped to fit the available space, as long as their length falls within a range of 220–400 mm and their height within 110–320 mm. Three-line motorcycle license plates have a size of 220 mm by 174 mm, while two-line scooter license plates are 140 mm by 114 mm.

Issuing of regular plates is done in Latin alphabetical order (AA, AB, AC, AE, AH, AI, AK, AM, AO, AP, AT, AX, BA, BB...).

License plates for trailers have the same design as regular plates, but with a suffix beginning with "X". They are issued in reverse alphabetical order (XX, XT, XP, XO...).

== License plate codes ==
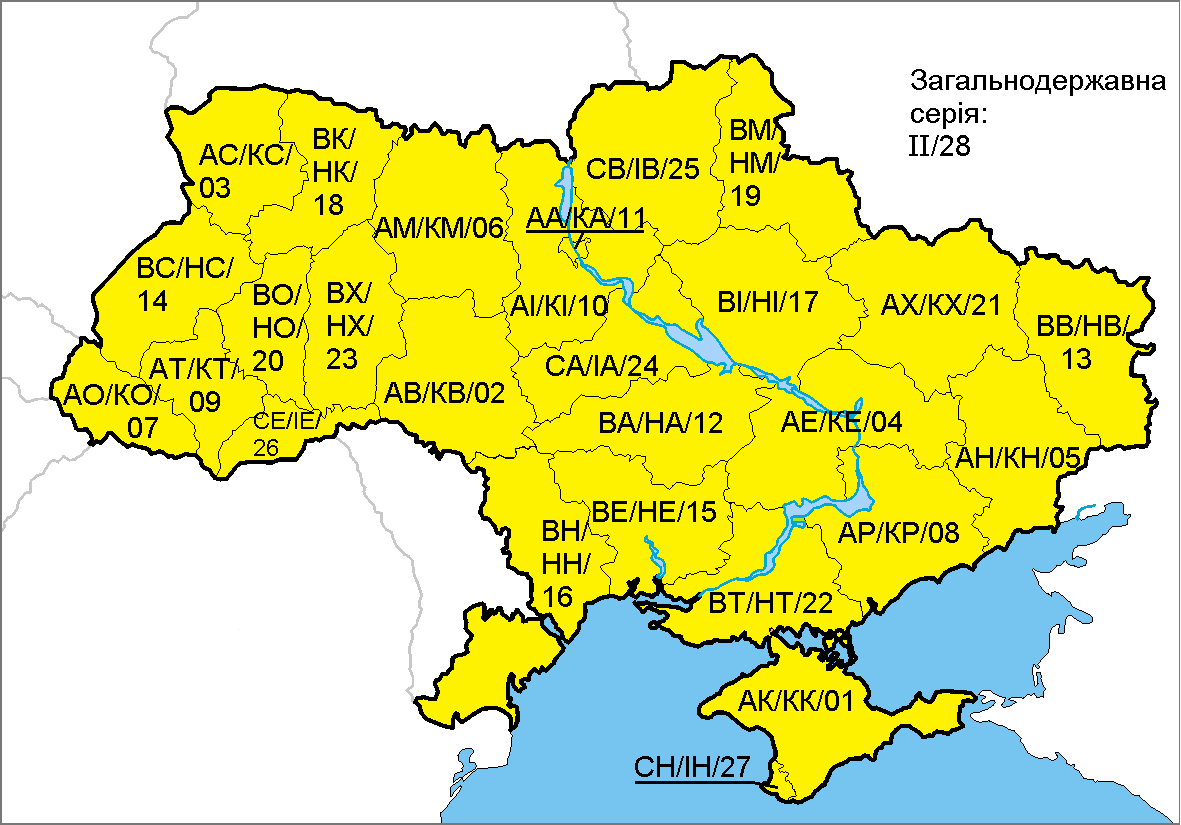
Map of registration codes

2004 prefix	2013 prefix	2021 prefix	Region
AA	KA	KK, TT	Kyiv city
AB	KB	IM, PI	Vinnytsia
AC	KC	CM, TC	Volyn
AE	KE	MI, PP	Dnipropetrovsk
AH	KH	MH, TH	Donetsk
AI	KI	EE, TI	Kyiv
AK	KK	MK, TK	Crimea
AM	KM	MB, TM	Zhytomyr
AO	KO	MO, MT	Zakarpattia
AP	KP	MP, TP	Zaporizhzhia
AT	KT	TO, XC	Ivano-Frankivsk
AX	KX	EX, XX	Kharkiv
BA	HA	EA, XA	Kirovohrad
BB	HB	EB, EP	Luhansk
BC	HC	EC, CC	Lviv
BE	HE	XE, XH	Mykolaiv
BH	HH	EH, OO	Odesa
BI	HI	EI, XI	Poltava
BK	HK	EK, XK	Rivne
BM	HM	EM, XM	Sumy
BO	HO	EO, XO	Ternopil
BP	HP		omitted because BP can be read as Verkhovna Rada (Верховна Рада), Ukraine's parliament.
BT	HT	ET, XT	Kherson
BX	HX	OX, PX	Khmelnytskyi
CA	IA	OA, PA	Cherkasy
CB	IB	OB, PB	Chernihiv
CC	IC		omitted because Cyrillic "CC" can be read as SS (Schutzstaffel)
CE	IE	OE, PE	Chernivtsi
CH	IH	OH, PH	Sevastopol city
DI		DI, PD	nationwide
II		ED, DC	nationwide

== Vanity plates ==
According to a 2007 decree, 2004 standard regular plates for private automobiles with triple leading zero combinations or combinations with all identical digits (except prohibited quadruple zero) are recognized as cherished and officially cost from ₴7,500 to ₴20,000 (approx. 240 to 640 €). Plate owner can choose any yet not assigned suffix within a region of vehicle registration. All other combinations are officially recognized as an ordinary, but virtually known that some of so-called "pretty" combinations were purchased.

Combination	Price, UAH
0001–0005; 0007–0009; 5555; 7777	20,000
1111; 2222; 3333; 4444; 8888; 9999	10,000
0006; 6666	7,500

== Recognition / collisions ==
Sofia/Cadiz/Cherkasy

By the order of characters current plates completely repeat current Bulgarian and former, but still valid, Spanish systems. Because of this some plates may not be quickly recognized by nationality. This applies to the four provinces of Spain with prefixes BA (Badajoz), BI (Biscay), CA (Cádiz), and IB (Balearic Islands); and to the five oblasts of Bulgaria with prefixes BT (Veliko Tarnovo), BH (Vidin), CA and CB (Sofia), CH (Sliven), and KH (Kyustendil) and also Bitola - BT, Kavadarci - KA, Kičevo - KI, Kočani - KO, Kriva Palanka - KP in Macedonia.

== Individualized (vanity) license plates ==
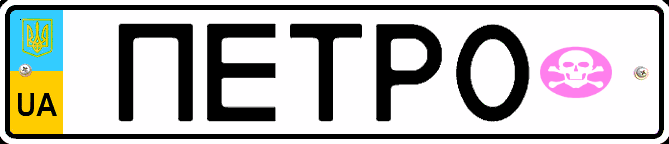
Former individualized plate

Individualized license plates are an additional type of plate, available for personal vehicles and motorcycles. State automobile inspection requires a previous vehicle registration with issuing of regular plates before issuing individualized plates. Using both plate-sets at the same time is prohibited, as well as driving abroad with the individualized license plates.

Individualized plates were first introduced in 1997 and included the numeric code of region. From 2004 have been issued plates with no region coding. Current (2007) individualized plates visually replicate the 1997 plates.

Plate-owners can choose Cyrillic or Roman letters for creation of individualized plates followed by some digits. In addition to the characters, plate owners can choose any image to print on the right-hand side of the plate. As far as it is known, this option is only available in Ukraine, so Ukrainian individualized plates are unique in this sense.

Plate owners are prohibited from using any discriminatory or offensive phrases or graphics, any national, language, religious or gender self-identification, using the names and logos of official state's authorities, or using the names and logos of foreign states and official foreign states' authorities.

== Pre-2004 regional codes ==
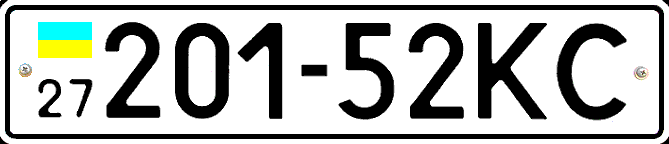
Former 1995 regular plate (still valid)

After introducing the current system, regions' numeric codes were used in some non-regular plates (white-on-red temporary, white-on-blue police plates and black-on white personalized plates).

Numeric codes	Letter suffixes	Region
01	КО, КР, PK	Crimea
02	ВI, BT, BX	Vinnytsia Oblast
03	ВК, ВМ, ВО	Volyn Oblast
04	АА, АВ, АЕ, АК, АН, AI, CM	Dnipropetrovsk Oblast
05	ЕА, ЕВ, ЕК, ЕН, ЕО, ЕС	Donetsk Oblast
06	ВА, ВВ, ВЕ	Zhytomyr Oblast
07	РТ, РЕ, РА	Zakarpattia Oblast
08	НА, НЕ, НО, НР, НС	Zaporizhzhia Oblast
09	ІВ, ІС	Ivano-Frankivsk Oblast
10	КК, КМ, КХ	Kyiv Oblast
11	КА, КВ, КЕ, КН, КІ, КТ, OO, II	Kyiv city
12	ОМ, ОН, ОС	Kirovohrad Oblast
13	АМ, АО, АР, АТ, АХ, IA	Luhansk Oblast
14	ТА, ТВ, ТН, ТС, TO, TT	Lviv Oblast
15	HI, НК, НТ	Mykolaiv Oblast
16	ОА, ОВ, ОЕ, ОК	Odesa Oblast
17	СК, СН, СС	Poltava Oblast
18	РА, РВ, РО	Rivne Oblast
19	СА, СВ, СЕ	Sumy Oblast
20	ТЕ, ТК, ТІ	Ternopil Oblast
21	AX, ХА, ХВ, ХК	Kharkiv Oblast
22	ХН, ХО	Kherson Oblast
23	ХМ, ХІ	Khmelnytskyi Oblast
24	МА, МВ, МЕ	Cherkasy Oblast
25	МК, ММ, МН	Chernihiv Oblast
26	МО, МР, МС	Chernivtsi Oblast
27	КС	Sevastopol city
28	HH, II	nationwide

== Special plates ==
=== Diplomatic plates ===
In April 2026 the colour scheme of diplomatic plates was changed to white on olive green with a blue band containing the Ukrainian flag above the letters UA at left. Additionally the code DP was changed to CD. Before the above date diplomatic plates was black-on-white, all combinations started with "D"-prefix followed by six digits. Three-digit group following "CD", "CC", "CDP" or "S"-prefix is the code that indicates: in interval 001-199 - embassies by countries, 200-299 - international organizations, 300-399 - consular authority by countries. Last three digits is the serial number. Unofficially issues two-line optimize shaped diplomatic license plates.

Former diplomatic plates is still valid. White-on-red plates consists|smaller font three-digit code (001-100), prefix (CDP for ambassadors, DP for embassy personnel, CC for consular corps, S for staff) and four or five serial digits. Earliest white-on-red diplomatic plates (1995) scheme included the same letter prefixes and four-six digits (depending from number|letters), where the first three was a country code.

There were the same scheme black-on-yellow plates for non-diplomatic purposes (F or IT prefix for foreign companies). Earliest black-on-yellow (1995) scheme included prefix followed by six digits (F for foreign companies, C for foreigners, B for permanent export). In F-plates first three digits was a country code, in B and C-plates - a region code (from 649 to 673).

After 2004 non-diplomatic plates isn't necessary, but still valid.

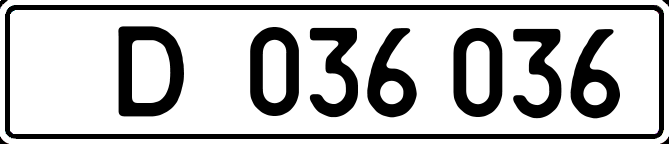
Current diplomatic plate

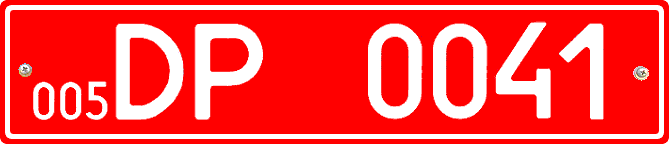
Former diplomatic plate (still valid)

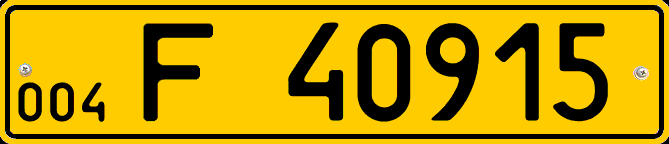
Former companies and media

=== Military and police plates ===
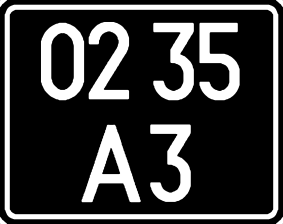
Sized military plate

Military plates were white-on-black, while police plates were white-on-blue. Volunteer military organization plates were colored white-on-dark green.

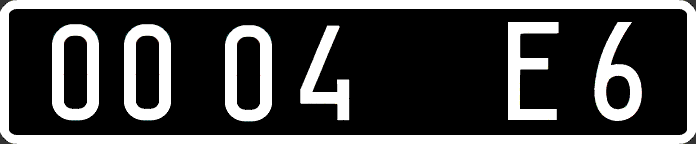
Military template plate

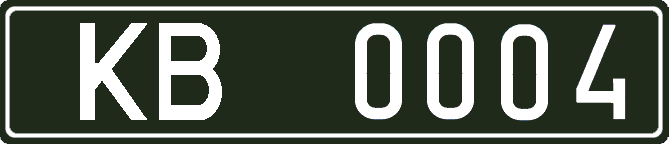
Volunteer military organisations plate

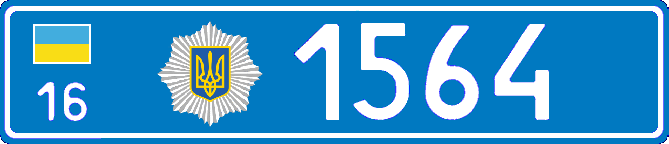
2004 Police plate

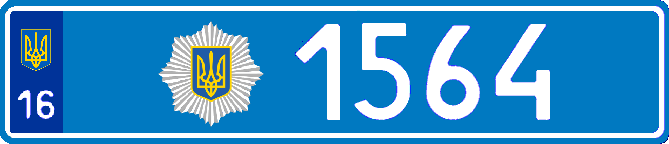
2015 Police plate

=== Temporary series ===
Currently three main temporary plate types exists:

1) Dealers issues trade plate with non-regional prefix in interval T0-T9. There three shapes of this plates: a) for cars, trucks, buses, trailers; b) for motorcycles; c) for mopeds.

2) Inter-district registration and examination departments (MREV) issues temporary plates with regional coded prefix (01-27) if the vehicle needs re-registration in another region or country. There three shapes of this plates: a) for cars, trucks, buses, trailers; b) for motorcycles; c) for mopeds.

3) Special authorities issues temporary plates for an agricultural and self-propelled construction equipment with TP-prefix in "moped" shape.

All of these plates were white-on-red.

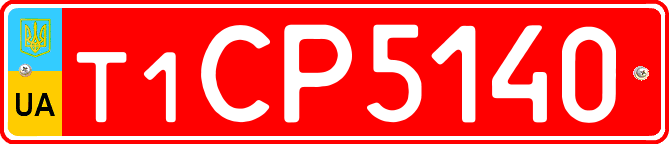
2004 Temporary series

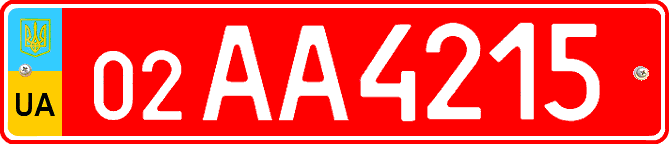
2004 Temporary series

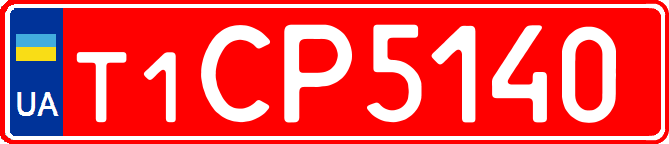
2015 Temporary series

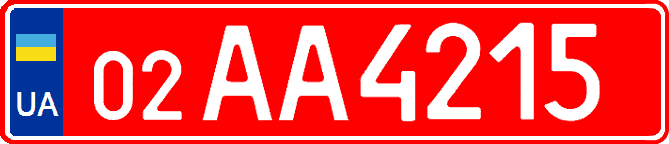
2015 Temporary series

== Diplomatic codes ==
Code	Country or organization	Code	Country or organization	Code	Country on organization
001	Not used (formerly Russia, diplomatic relationships terminated since 24 February 2022)	035	Turkey	069	Iraq
002	United States	036	Norway	070	Kyrgyzstan
003	China	037	Algeria	071	Tajikistan
004	United Kingdom	038	Switzerland	072	Uzbekistan
005	France	039	Niger	073	Turkmenistan
006	Germany	040	Vatican City	074	Thailand
007	Hungary	041	Azerbaijan	075	Tunisia
008	Lithuania	042	South Korea	076	Ghana
009	Bulgaria	043	Brazil	077	Serbia
010	Armenia	044	Denmark	078	Liechtenstein
011	Australia	045	Latvia	079	Indonesia
012	Israel	046	Croatia	080	Morocco
013	Belarus	047	Cyprus	081	Jordan
014	Poland	048	Czech Republic	082	Kuwait
015	Estonia	049	Finland	083	Luxembourg
016	Not used (formerly North Korea, diplomatic relationships terminated since 13 July 2022)	050	Seychelles	084	OSCE
017	Sweden	051	United Nations	085	Uruguay
018	Mexico	052	Central African Republic	086	Peru
019	Greece	053	Slovenia	087	Red Cross
020	India	054	Belgium	088	Afghanistan
021	Iran	055	Moldova	089	SCTU
022	Mongolia	056	Cuba	090	Serbia (formerly Bangladesh)
023	Vietnam	057	Philippines	091	Albania
024	Austria	058	South Africa	092	North Macedonia
025	Egypt	059	Pakistan	093	NATO
026	Argentina	060	Libya	094	NATO Information Center
027	Japan	061	IBRD	095	IMF
028	Canada	062	IFC	096	New Zealand
029	Portugal	063	Syria	097	Bangladesh
030	Chile	064	Singapore	098	European Union
031	Italy	065	Ireland	099	EBRD
032	Spain	066	Netherlands	100	GDIP (service set)
033	Slovakia	067	Kazakhstan	199	Bank for reconstruction
034	Romania	068	Georgia	206	OSCE

== See also ==
- Vehicle registration plate
- Vehicle registration plates of Europe
