= Network (Russia) =

Allegedly existed terrorist organization

- Dates active: 2015–2017

“Network” («Сеть») was allegedly an anti-government anarchist organization active in Russia in 2015–2017. Its alleged members were arrested in 2017 and sentenced on 10 February 2020 by the Russian military court in Penza to prison terms from 6 to 18 years.

- Dmitri Pchelintsev — sentenced to 18 years in maximum security prison.
- Ilya Shakursky — sentenced to 16 years in maximum security prison and a fine of 50,000 roubles (about $536 U.S. dollars as of April 2024).
- Andrew Chernov — sentenced to 14 years in maximum security prison.
- Maxim Ivankin — sentenced to 13 years in maximum security prison.
- Mikhail Kulkov — sentenced to 10 years in maximum security prison.
- Vasiliy Kuksov — sentenced to 9 years in prison.
- Arman Sagynbaev — sentenced to 6 years in prison.

The case of "Network" caused a wide condemnation in Russia, with many protesting against the trials and sentencing. Andrei Kolesnikov from the Carnegie Moscow Center went on to label the story of the "Network" as "the return of Stalinist show trials", referencing the Moscow trials instigated by Joseph Stalin in the Soviet Union between 1936 and 1938. According to Amnesty International's representative, the organization itself had never existed; Amnesty International had previously expressed concern about torture and other ill-treatment used by FSB to extract confessions from the defendants. Memorial Society from Moscow also claimed that the whole case was fabricated and politically motivated, and designated the accused as political prisoners.

"Network" is listed as a terrorist group in Russia.

== See also ==
- Arkhangelsk FSB office bombing
- People's Self-Defense (Russia)
- Azat Miftakhov
- Tyumen case of anti-fascists
