= Anarchism in Russia =

Anarchism in Russia developed out of the populist and nihilist movements' dissatisfaction with the government reforms of the time.

The first Russian to identify himself as an anarchist was the revolutionary socialist Mikhail Bakunin, who became a founding figure of the modern anarchist movement within the International Workingmen's Association (IWA). In the context of the split within the IWA between the Marxists and the anarchists, the Russian Land and Liberty organization also split between a Marxist faction that supported political struggle and an anarchist faction that supported "propaganda of the deed", the latter of which went on to orchestrate the assassination of Alexander II.

Specifically anarchist groups such as the Black Banner began to emerge at the turn of the 20th century, culminating with the anarchist participation in the Russian Revolutions of 1905 and 1917. Though initially supportive of the Bolsheviks, many anarchists turned against them in the wake of the treaty of Brest-Litovsk, launching a "Third Revolution" against the government with the intention of restoring soviet democracy. But this attempted revolution was crushed by 1921, definitively ending with the suppression of the Kronstadt rebellion and the defeat of the Revolutionary Insurgent Army of Ukraine.

The anarchist movement lived on during the time of the Soviet Union in small pockets, largely within the Gulag where anarchist political prisoners were sent, but by the late 1930s its old guard had either fled into exile, died or disappeared during the Great Purge. Following a number of uprisings in the wake of the death of Stalin, libertarian communism began to reconstitute itself within the dissident human rights movement, and by the time of the dissolution of the Soviet Union, the anarchist movement had re-emerged onto the public sphere. In the modern day, anarchists make up a part of the opposition movement to the government of Vladimir Putin.

== History ==
=== Bakunin and the anarchists' exile ===
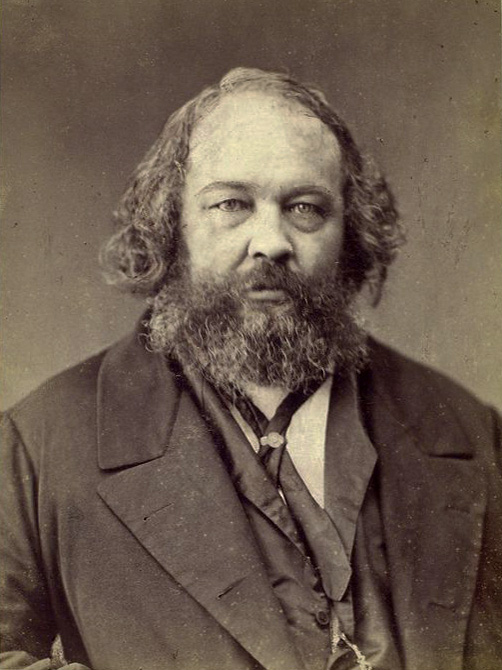
Mikhail Bakunin

In 1848, on his return to Paris, Mikhail Bakunin published a fiery tirade against Russia, which caused his expulsion from France. The revolutionary movement of 1848 gave him the opportunity to join a radical campaign of democratic agitation, and for his participation in the May Uprising in Dresden of 1849 he was arrested and condemned to death. The death sentence, however, was commuted to life imprisonment, and he was eventually handed over to the Russian authorities, by whom he was imprisoned and finally sent to Eastern Siberia in 1857.

Bakunin received permission to move to the Amur region, where he started collaborating with his relative General Count Nikolay Muravyov-Amursky, who had been Governor of Eastern Siberia for ten years. When Muravyov was removed from his position, Bakunin lost his stipend. He succeeded in escaping, probably with the collusion of the authorities and made his way through Japan and the United States to England in 1861. He spent the rest of his life in exile in Western Europe, principally in Switzerland.

In January 1869, Sergey Nechayev spread false rumors of his arrest in Saint Petersburg, then left for Moscow before heading abroad. In Geneva, he pretended to be a representative of a revolutionary committee who had fled from the Peter and Paul Fortress, and he won the confidence of revolutionary-in-exile Mikhail Bakunin and his friend Nikolay Ogarev.

Bakunin played a prominent part in developing and elaborating the theory of anarchism and in leading the anarchist movement. He left a deep imprint on the movement of the Russian "revolutionary commoners" of the 1870s.

In 1873, Peter Kropotkin was arrested and imprisoned, but escaped in 1876 and went to England, moving after a short stay to Switzerland, where he joined the Jura Federation. In 1877 he went to Paris, where he helped to start the anarchist movement there. He returned to Switzerland in 1878, where he edited a revolutionary newspaper for the Jura Federation called Le Révolté, subsequently also publishing various revolutionary pamphlets.

=== Nihilist movement ===
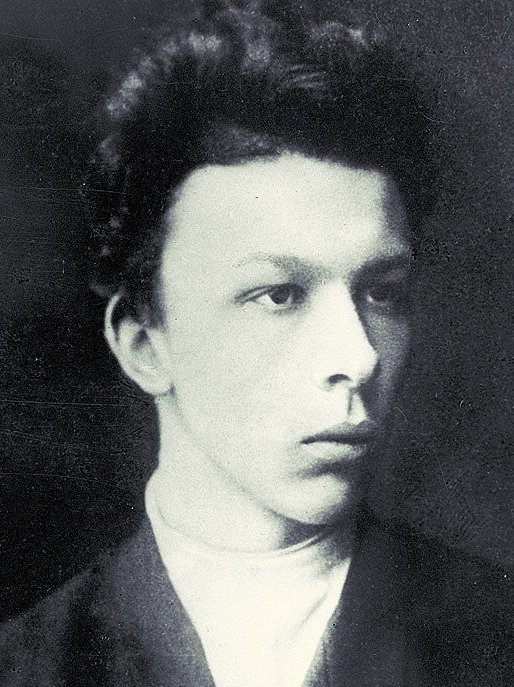
Aleksandr Ulyanov

After an assassination attempt, Count Mikhail Tarielovich Loris-Melikov was appointed the head of the Supreme Executive Commission and given extraordinary powers to fight the revolutionaries. Loris-Melikov's proposals called for some form of parliamentary body, and the Emperor Alexander II seemed to agree; these plans were never realized as of March 13 (March 1 Old Style), 1881, Alexander was assassinated: while driving on one of the central streets of St. Petersburg, near the Winter Palace, he was mortally wounded by hand-made grenades and died a few hours afterwards. The conspirators Nikolai Kibalchich, Sophia Perovskaya, Nikolai Rysakov, Timofey Mikhailov, and Andrei Zhelyabov were all arrested and sentenced to death. Hesya Helfman was sent to Siberia. The assassin was identified as Ignacy Hryniewiecki (Ignatei Grinevitski), who died during the attack.

=== Tolstoyan movement ===
Although he did not call himself an anarchist, Leo Tolstoy (1828–1910) in his later writings formulated a philosophy that amounted to advocating resistance to the state, and influenced the worldwide development of anarchism as well as pacifism worldwide. In a series of books and articles, including What I Believe (1884) (Russian: В чём моя вера?) and Christianity and Patriotism (1894), (Russian: Христианство и патриотизм) Tolstoy used the Christian gospels as a starting-point for an ideology that held violence as the ultimate evil.

Tolstoy professed contempt for the private ownership of land, but his anarchism lay primarily in his view that the state exists essentially as an instrument of compulsory force, which he considered the antithesis of all religious teachings. He once wrote, "A man who unconditionally promises in advance to submit to laws which are made and will be made by men, by this very promise renounces Christianity."

In the 1880s Tolstoy's pacifist anarchism gained a following in Russia. In the following decades the Tolstoyan movement, which Tolstoy himself had not expected or encouraged, spread through Russia and to other countries. Resistance to war had particular meaning in Russia since Emperor Alexander II had implemented compulsory military service in 1874. From the 1880s into the early 20th century, an increasing number of young men refused military service on the basis of a Tolstoyan moral objection to war. Such actions moved Tolstoy, and he often participated in the defense of peaceful objectors in court.

Many people inspired by Tolstoy's version of Christian morality set up agricultural communes in various parts of Russia, pooling their income and producing their own food, shelter and goods. Tolstoy appreciated such efforts but sometimes criticized these groups for isolating themselves from the rest of the country, feeling that the communes did little to contribute to a worldwide peace movement.

Although Tolstoy's actions frequently diverged from the ideals he set for himself (for example, he owned a large estate), his followers continued to promote the Tolstoyan vision of world peace well after his death in 1910.

=== Individualist anarchism ===
Individualist anarchism was one of the three categories of anarchism in Russia, along with the more prominent anarcho-communism and anarcho-syndicalism. The ranks of the Russian individualist anarchists were predominantly drawn from the intelligentsia and the working class. For anarchist historian Paul Avrich "The two leading exponents of individualist anarchism, both based in Moscow, were Aleksei Alekseevich Borovoi and Lev Chernyi (Pavel Dmitrievich Turchaninov). From Nietzsche, they inherited the desire for a complete overturn of all values accepted by bourgeois society- political, moral, and cultural. Furthermore, strongly influenced by Max Stirner and Benjamin Tucker, the German and American theorists of individualist anarchism, they demanded the total liberation of the human personality from the fetters of organized society."

Some Russian individualist anarchists "found the ultimate expression of their social alienation in violence and crime, others attached themselves to avant-garde literary and artistic circles, but the majority remained "philosophical" anarchists who conducted animated parlor discussions and elaborated their individualist theories in ponderous journals and books."

Lev Chernyi was an important individualist anarchist involved in resistance against the rise to power of the Bolshevik Party. He adhered mainly to Stirner and the ideas of Benjamin Tucker. In 1907, he published a book entitled Associational Anarchism, in which he advocated the "free association of independent individuals." On his return from Siberia in 1917 he enjoyed great popularity among Moscow workers as a lecturer. Chernyi was also Secretary of the Moscow Federation of Anarchist Groups, which was formed in March 1917. He was an advocate "for the seizure of private homes", which was an activity seen by the anarchists after the October revolution as direct expropriation on the bourgeoisie. He died after being accused of participation in an episode in which this group bombed the headquarters of the Moscow Committee of the Communist Party. Although most likely not being really involved in the bombing, he might have died of torture.

Chernyi advocated a Nietzschean overthrow of the values of bourgeois Russian society, and rejected the voluntary communes of anarcho-communist Peter Kropotkin as a threat to the freedom of the individual. Scholars including Avrich and Allan Antliff have interpreted this vision of society to have been greatly influenced by the individualist anarchists Max Stirner, and Benjamin Tucker. Subsequent to the book's publication, Chernyi was imprisoned in Siberia under the Russian Czarist regime for his revolutionary activities.

On the other hand, Alexei Borovoi (1876?-1936), was a professor of philosophy at Moscow University, "a gifted orator and the author of numerous books, pamphlets, and articles which attempted to reconcile individualist anarchism with the doctrines of syndicallism". He wrote among other theoretical works, Anarkhizm in 1918 just after the October revolution and Anarchism and Law.

=== The Doukhobors ===
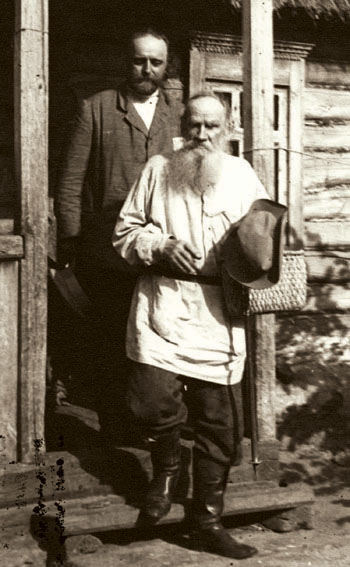
Leo Tolstoy and Vladimir Chertkov

The origin of the Doukhobors dates back to 16th- and 17th-century Muscovy. The Doukhobors ("Spirit Wrestlers") are a radical Christian sect who maintained a belief in pacifism and a communal lifestyle while rejecting secular government. In 1899, the most zealous third (about 7,400) Doukhobors fled repression in Imperial Russia and migrated to Canada, mostly in the provinces of Saskatchewan and British Columbia. The funds for the trip were paid for by the Religious Society of Friends and the Russian novelist Leo Tolstoy. Peter Kropotkin suggested Canada to Tolstoy as a safe-haven for the Doukhobors because while on a speaking tour across Canada, Kropotkin observed the religious tolerance experienced by the Mennonites.

=== Revolution of 1905 ===
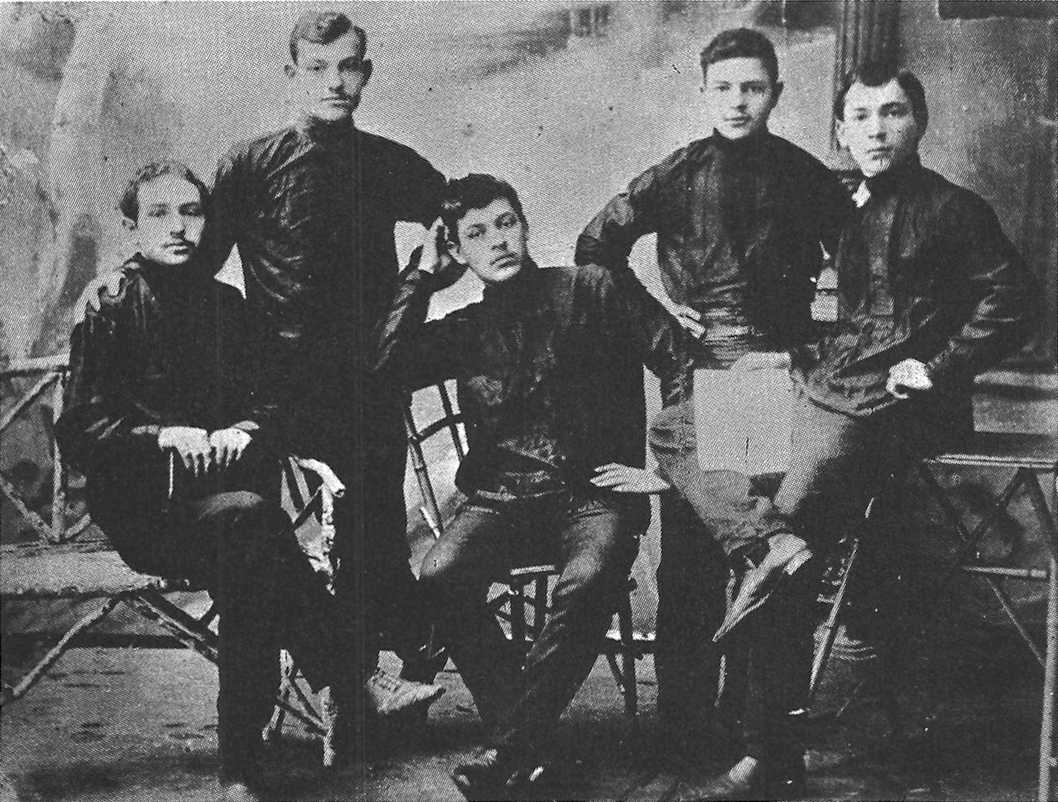
Members of Chernoe Znamia

The first anarchist groups to attract a significant following of Russian workers or peasants, were the anarcho-communist Chernoe-Znamia groups, founded in Białystok in 1903. They drew their support mainly from the impoverished and persecuted working-class Jews of the "Pale"-the places on the Western borders of the Russian Empire where Jews were "allowed" to live. The Chernoe Znamia made their first attack in 1904, when Nisan Farber, a devoted member of the group, stabbed a strike-breaking industrialist on the Jewish Day of Atonement. The Chernoe Znamia, Left SRs and Zionists of Bialystock congregated inside a forest to decide their next action. At the end of the meeting the shouts of "Long Live the Social Revolution" and "Hail Anarchy" attracted the police to the secret meeting. Violence ensued, leaving many revolutionaries arrested or wounded. In vengeance, Nisan Farber threw a homemade bomb at a police station, killing himself and injuring many. He quickly became a Revolutionary Martyr to the Anarchists, and when Bloody Sunday broke out in St Petersburg his actions began to be imitated by the rest of the Chernoe Znamias. Obtaining weapons was the first objective. Police stations, gun shops and arsenals were raided and their stock stolen. Bomb labs were set up and money gleaned from expropriations went to buying more weapons from Vienna. Bialystock became a warzone, virtually everyday an Anarchist attack or a Police repression. Ekaterinoslav, Odessa, Warsaw and Baku all became witnesses to more and more gunpoint hold-ups and tense shootouts. Sticks of dynamite were thrown into factories or mansions of the most loathed capitalists. Workers were encouraged to overthrow their bosses and manage the factory for themselves. Workers and peasants throughout the Empire took this advice to heart and sporadic uprisings in the remote countryside became a common sight. The Western borderlands in particular - the cities of Russian Poland, Ukraine and Lithuania flared up in anger and hatred.

The Revolution in the Pale reached a bloody climax in November and December 1905 with the bombing of the Hotel Bristol in Warsaw and the Cafe Libman in Odessa. After the suppression of the December Uprising in Moscow, the Anarchists retreated for a while, but soon returned to the Revolution. Even the small towns and villages of the countryside had their own Anarchist fighting groups. But the tide was turning against the revolutionaries. In 1907, the Tsarist Minister Stolypin set about his new "pacification" program. Police received more arms, orders and reinforcements to raid Anarchist centres. The police would track the Anarchists to their headquarters and then strike swiftly and brutally. The Anarchists were tried by court martial in which preliminary investigation was waived, verdicts delivered within 2 days and sentences executed immediately. Rather than succumb to the ignominy of arrest, many Anarchists preferred suicide when cornered. Those that were caught would usually deliver a rousing speech on Justice and Anarchy before they were executed, in the manner of Ravachol and Émile Henry. By 1909 most of the Anarchists were either dead, exiled or in jail. Anarchism was not to resurface in Russia until 1917.

=== February Revolution ===
In 1917, Peter Kropotkin returned to Petrograd, where he helped Alexander Kerensky's Russian Provisional Government to formulate policies. He curtailed his activity when the Bolsheviks came to power.

Following the abdication of Czar Nicholas II in February 1917 and the subsequent creation of a Provisional Government, many Russian anarchists joined the Bolsheviks in campaigning for further revolution. Since the repression after the Revolution of 1905, new anarchist organizations had been slowly and quietly growing in Russia, and in 1917 saw a new opportunity to end state power.

Though within the next year they would come to consider the Bolsheviks traitors to the socialist cause, urban anarchist groups initially saw Lenin and his comrades as allies in the fight against capitalist oppression. Understanding the need for widespread support in his quest for Communism, Lenin often deliberately appealed to anarchist sentiments in the eight months between the February and October Revolutions. Many optimistic anarchists interpreted Lenin's slogan of “All Power to the Soviets!” as the potential for a Russia run by autonomous collectives without the burden of central authority. Lenin also described the triumph of Communism as the eventual “withering away of the state.” All this time, however, anarchists remained wary of the Bolsheviks. Mikhail Bakunin, the hero of Russian anarchism, had expressed skepticism toward the scientific, excessively rational nature of Marxism. He and his followers preferred a more instinctive form of revolution. One of them, Bill Shatov, described the anarchists as “the romanticists of the Revolution.” Their eagerness to get the ball rolling became apparent during the July Days, in which Petrograd soldiers, sailors and workers revolted in an attempt to claim power for the Petrograd Soviet. While this was not an anarchist-driven event, the anarchists of Petrograd played a large role in inciting the people of the city to action. In any case, Lenin was not amused by the revolt and instructed those involved to quiet down until he told them otherwise.

In spite of some tension between the groups, the anarchists remained largely supportive of Lenin right up to the October Revolution. Several anarchists participated in the overthrow of the Provisional Government, and even the Military Revolutionary Committee that orchestrated the coup.

=== October Revolution ===
At first it seemed to some Anarchists the revolution could inaugurate the stateless society they had long dreamed of. On these terms, some Bolshevik-Anarchist alliances were made. In Moscow, the most perilous and critical tasks during the October Revolution fell upon the Anarchist Regiment, led by the old libertarians, and it was they who dislodged the Whites from the Kremlin, the Metropole and other defenses. In addition, it was the Anarchist sailor who led the attack on the Constituent Assembly in October 1917. For a while, the Anarchists rejoiced, elated at the thought of the new age that Russia had won.

Bolshevik-anarchist relations soon turned sour as the various anarchist groups realized that the Bolsheviks were not interested in pluralism, but rather a centralized one-party rule. A few prominent anarchist figures such as Bill Shatov and Yuda Roshchin, despite their disappointment, encouraged anarchists to cooperate with the Bolsheviks in the present conflict with the hope that there would be time to negotiate. But most anarchists became disillusioned quite quickly with their supposed Bolshevik allies, who took over the soviets and placed them under Communist control.

The sense of betrayal came to a head in March 1918, when Lenin signed the Brest-Litovsk peace treaty with Germany. Though the Bolshevik leaders claimed that the treaty was necessary to allow the revolution to progress, anarchists widely saw it as an excessive compromise which counteracted the idea of international revolution. The Bolsheviks had begun to see the anarchists as a legitimate threat and associated criminality such as robberies, expropriations and murders with anarchist associations. Subsequently, the Council of People's Commissars (Sovnarkom) decided to liquidate criminal recklessness which was associated with anarchists and disarm all anarchist groups in the face of their militancy. After months of increasing anarchist resistance and dwindling Bolshevik patience, the Communist government decisively split with their libertarian agitators in the spring of 1918. In Moscow and Petrograd the newly formed Cheka was sent in to disband all anarchist organizations, and largely succeeded.

On the night of April 12, 1918, the Cheka raided 26 anarchist centres in Moscow, including the House of Anarchy, the headquarters of the Moscow Federation of Anarchist Groups. A fierce battle raged on Malaia Dimitrovka Street. About 40 anarchists were killed or wounded, and approximately 500 were imprisoned. A dozen Cheka agents had also been killed in the fighting. Anarchists joined Mensheviks and Left Socialist revolutionaries in boycotting the 1918 May Day celebrations. Bolshevik repressions of anarchist organizations prompted a series of assassination attempts on the Russian Communist leadership.

By this time some belligerent anarchist dissenters armed themselves and formed groups of so-called “Black Guards” that continued to fight Communist power on a small scale as the Civil War began. The urban anarchist movement, however, was dead.

=== Civil War ===
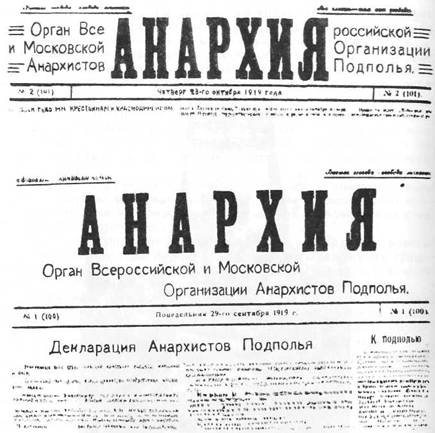
Anarchy (Newspaper of the Moscow Federation of Anarchist Groups) Sept. 29 1919

The anthropologist Eric Wolf asserts that peasants in rebellion are "natural" anarchists. After initially looking favorably upon the Bolsheviks for their proposed land reforms, by 1918 peasants largely came to despise the new government as it became increasingly centralized and exploitative in its dealings with the rural population. Marxist-Leninists had never given the peasants great credit, and with the Civil War against the White Armies underway, the Red Army primarily used peasant villages as suppliers of grain, which it “requisitioned,” or in other words, seized by force.

On the other hand, there was an anarchist group known as the Anarcho-Futurists, which would be a short lived movement within Russia. In contrast to the peasantry that tends to be the other anarchist groups, this group consisted of intellectuals. The Anarcho-Futurists would consist of two other smaller groups as well, the Neo-Nihilists and the Anarcho-Hyperboreans. These groups would not last long, nor would they have a meaningful impact, however there is still not much known about this circle. The Anarcho-Futurist circle is known to have been based in Kharkiv. Some of these groups are suspected to have been around mostly after the 1905 Revolution, however the Anarcho-Futurist Manifesto was written in 1919, which mentions both the Neo-Nihilists and Anarcho-Hyperboreans as part with the Anarcho-Futurists. These groups were vigorously anti-civilization and consisted of intellectuals, as seen with how poetic they intended for the writing to be in the Anarcho-Futurist Manifesto.

Abused equally by the Red and invading White armies, large groups of peasants, as well as Red Army deserters, formed “Green” armies that resisted the Reds and Whites alike. These forces had no grand political agenda like their enemies, for the most part they simply wanted to stop being harassed and be allowed to govern themselves. Though the Green Armies have largely been ignored by history (and by Soviet historians in particular), they constituted a formidable force and a major threat to Red victory in the Civil War. Even after the party declared the Civil War over in 1920, the Red-Green war persisted for some time.

Red Army generals noted that in many regions peasant rebellions were heavily influenced by anarchist leaders and ideas. In Ukraine, the most notorious peasant rebel leader was an anarchist general named Nestor Makhno. Makhno had originally led his forces in collaboration with the Red Army against the Whites. In the region of Ukraine where his forces were stationed, Makhno oversaw the development of an autonomous system of government based on the productive coordination of communes. According to Peter Marshall, a historian of anarchism, "For more than a year, anarchists were in charge of a large territory, one of the few examples of anarchy in action on a large scale in modern history.

Unsurprisingly, the Bolsheviks came to see Makhno's experiment in self-government as a threat in need of elimination, and in 1920 the Red Army sought to take control of Makhno's forces. They resisted, but the officers (not including Makhno himself) were arrested and executed by the end of 1920. Makhno continued to fight before going into exile in Paris the next year.

==== Third Russian Revolution ====
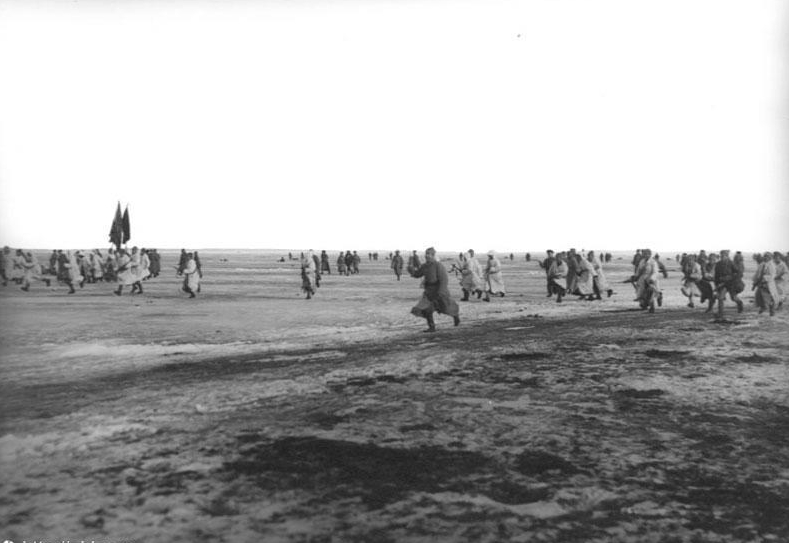
Red Army troops attack Kronstadt.

The attempted Third Russian Revolution began in July 1918 with the assassination of the German Ambassador to the Soviet Union in order to prevent the signing of the Treaty of Brest-Litovsk. This was immediately followed by an artillery attack on the Kremlin and the occupation of the telegraph and telephone buildings by the Left SRs who sent out several manifestos appealing to the people to rise up against their oppressors and destroy the Bolshevik regime. But whilst this order was not followed by the people of Moscow, the peasants of South Russia responded vigorously to this call to arms. Bands of Chernoe Znamia and Beznachaly anarchist terrorists flared up as rapidly and violently as they had done in 1905. Anarchists in Rostov, Ekaterinoslav and Briansk broke into prisons to liberate the anarchist prisoners and issued fiery proclamations calling on the people to revolt against the Bolshevik regime. The Anarchist Battle Detachments attacked the Whites, Reds and Germans alike. Many peasants joined the Revolution, attacking their enemies with pitchforks and sickles. Meanwhile, in Moscow, the Underground Anarchists were formed by Kazimir Kovalevich and Piotr Sobalev to be the shock troops of the Revolution, infiltrating Bolshevik ranks and striking when least expected. On 25 September 1919, the Underground Anarchists struck the Bolsheviks with the heaviest blow of the Revolution. The headquarters of the Moscow Committee of the Communist Party was blown up, killing 12 and injuring 55 Party members, including Nikolai Bukharin and Emilian Iaroslavskii. Spurred on by their apparent success, the Underground Anarchists proclaimed a new "era of dynamite" that would finally wipe away capitalism and the State. The Bolsheviks responded by initiating a new wave of mass arrests in which Kovalevich and Sobalev were the first to be shot. With their leaders dead and much of their organization in tatters, the remaining Underground Anarchists blew themselves up in their last battle with the Cheka, taking much of their safe house with them. Numerous attacks and assassinations occurred frequently until the Revolution finally petered out in 1922. Although the Revolution was mainly a Left SR initiative, it was the Anarchists who had the support of a greater number of the population and they participated in almost all of the attacks the Left SRs organized, and also many on completely their own initiative. The most celebrated figures of the Third Russian Revolution, Lev Chernyi and Fanya Baron were both Anarchists.

=== In exile ===
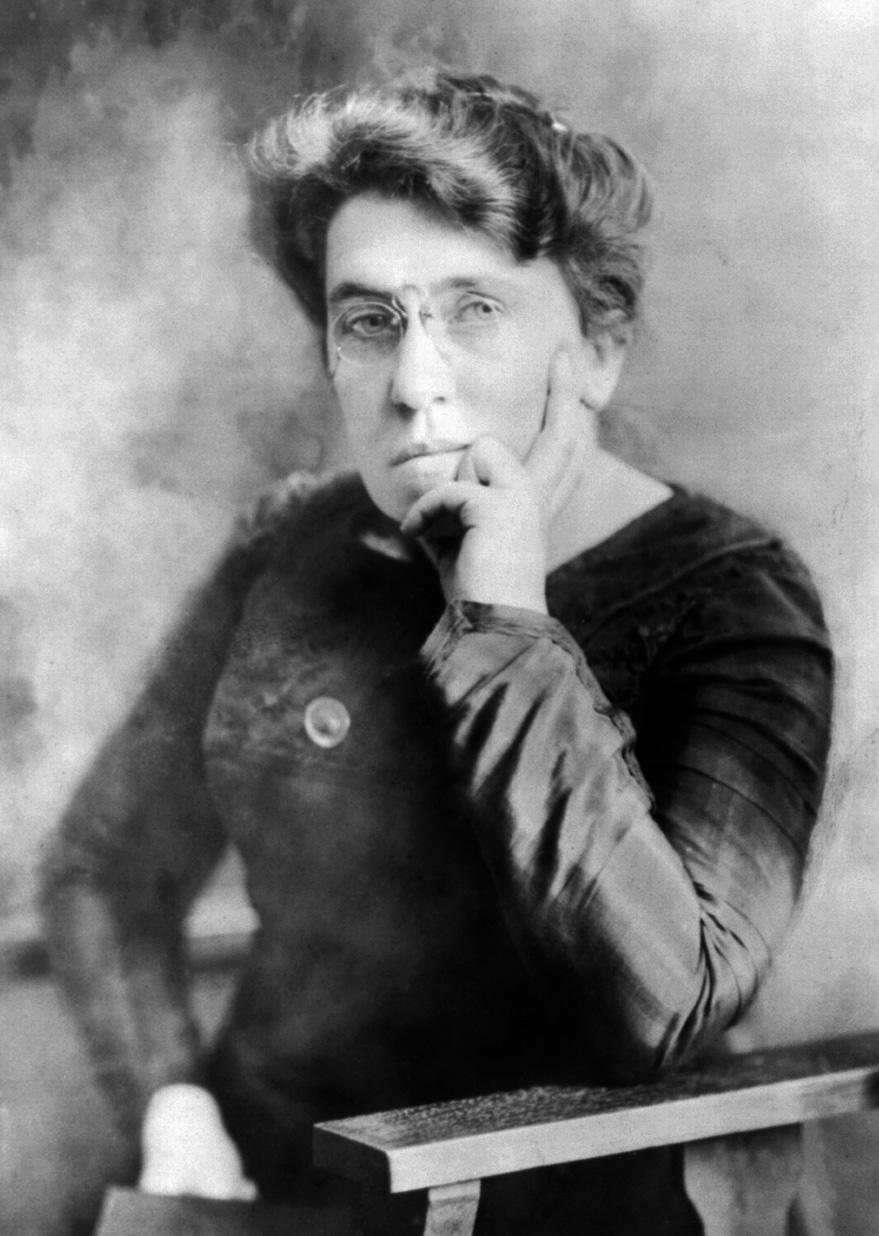
Emma Goldman, author of My Disillusionment in Russia.

Following the suppression of the anarchist movement in Russia, a number of anarchists fled the country into exile, such as Emma Goldman, Alexander Berkman, Alexander Schapiro, Volin, Mark Mratchny, Grigorii Maksimov, Boris Yelensky, Senya Fleshin and Mollie Steimer, who went on to establish relief organizations which provided aid for anarchist political prisoners back in Russia.

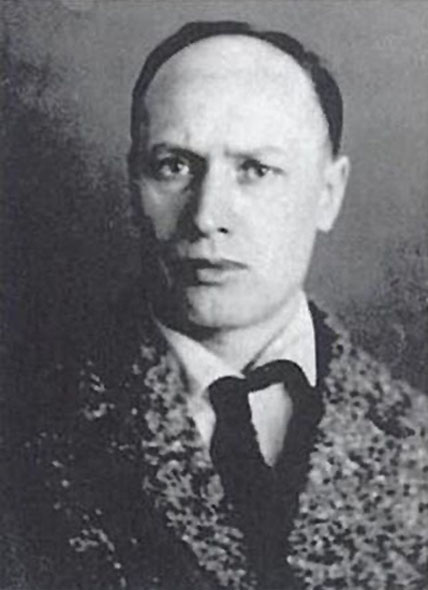
Peter Arshinov, co-founder of the platformist tendency.

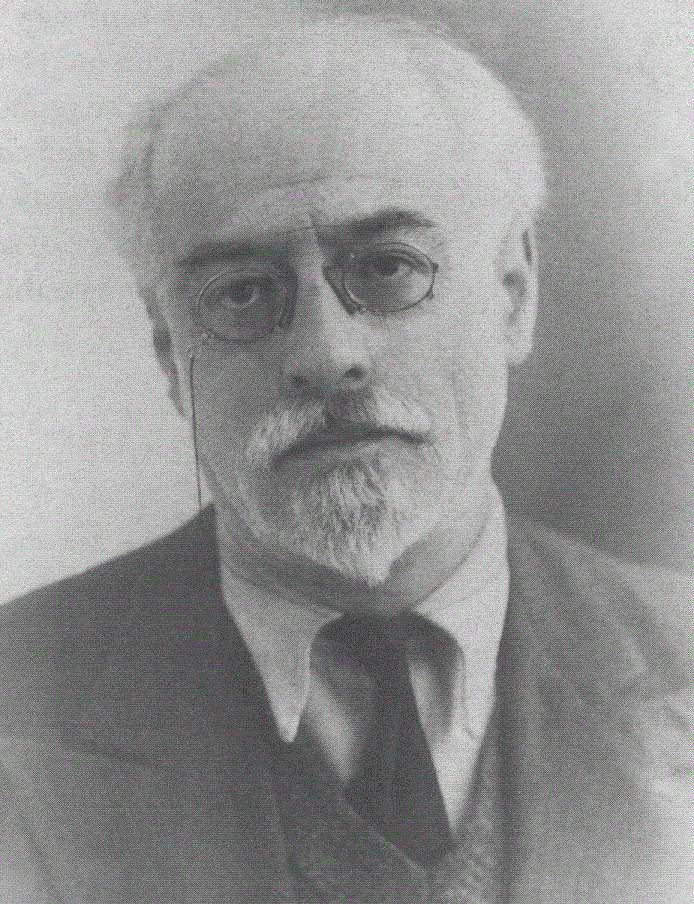
Volin, co-founder of the synthesis tendency.

To the disillusioned Russian anarchist exiles, the experience of the Russian Revolution had fully justified Mikhail Bakunin's earlier declaration that "socialism without liberty is slavery and brutality." Russian anarchists living abroad began to openly attack the "new kings" of the Communist Party, criticising the NEP as a restoration of capitalism and comparing Vladimir Lenin to the Spanish inquisitor Tomás de Torquemada, the Italian political philosopher Niccolò Machiavelli and the French revolutionary Maximilien Robespierre. They positioned themselves in opposition to the Bolshevik government, calling for the destruction of Russian state capitalism and its replacement with workers' self-management by factory committees and councils. But while anarchist exiles were united in their criticisms of the Bolshevik government and their recognition that the Russian anarchist movement had collapsed due to its disorganization, their internal divisions remained, with the anarcho-syndicalists around Grigorii Maksimov, Efim Yarchuk and Alexander Schapiro establishing The Workers' Way as their organ, while anarcho-communists around Peter Arshinov and Volin established The Anarchist Herald as their own.

The anarcho-syndicalists looked to remedy the issue of anarchist disorganization through the foundation of a new international organization, culminating in the establishment of the International Workers' Association (IWA) in December 1922. The IWA analyzed the events of the Russian Revolution as having been a project to build state socialism rather than revolutionary socialism, called for the construction of trade unions to win short-term gains while building towards a general strike and declared their goal to be a social revolution that would abolish centralized states and replace them with a network of workers' councils. Maxmioff later moved to the United States, where he edited The Laborer's Voice, a Russian language publication of the Industrial Workers of the World (IWW).

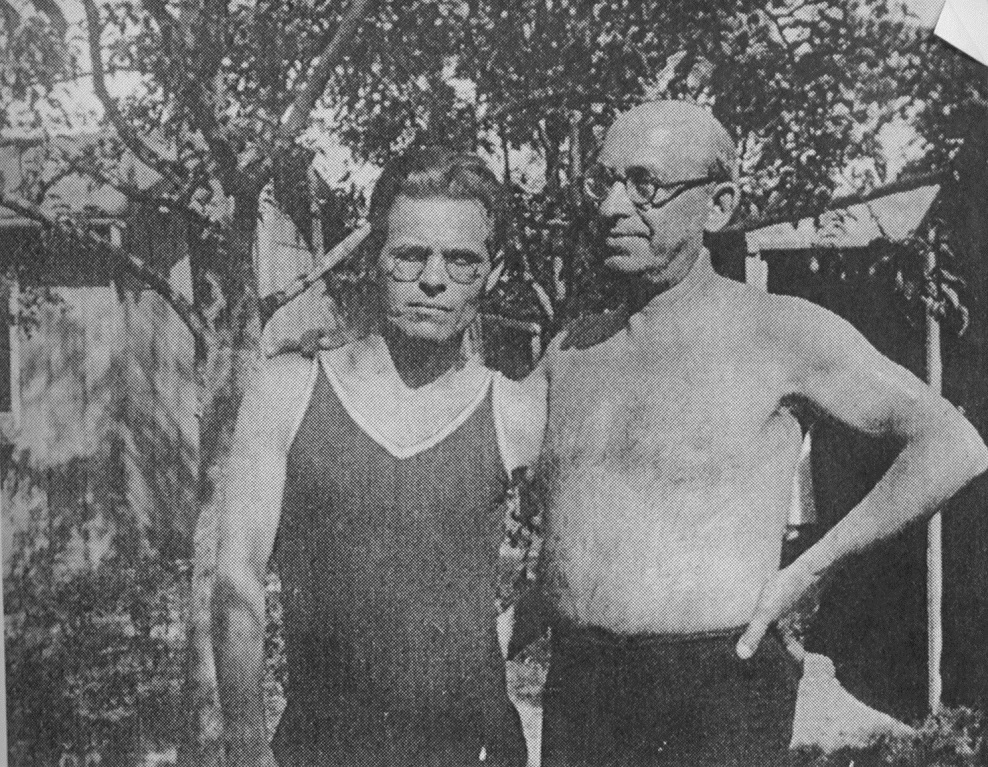
Nestor Makhno and Alexander Berkman, while in exile in Paris (1927).

Meanwhile, the anarcho-communists around the Workers' Cause journal began to develop the platformist tendency, calling for the construction of a tightly coordinated anarchist organization, which was supported chiefly by Peter Arshinov and Nestor Makhno. This platform was criticized as authoritarian by a number of dissenting voices, including Voline, Senya Fleshin and Mollie Steimer. Arshinov and Makhno's short-tempered response to these criticisms drew the ire of other Russian exiles such as Alexander Berkman and Emma Goldman, who denounced them respectively as a "Bolshevik" and a "militarist", while also expressing a distaste with Fleshin and Steimer's factionalism.

During the late 1920s, a number of anarchist exiles decided to return to Russia and appealed to the Soviet government for permission. With the aid of the Right Oppositionist Nikolai Bukharin, Efim Iarchuk was permitted to return in 1925, after which he joined the Communist Party. In 1930, Arshniov also returned to Russia under amnesty and joined the Communist Party, leaving Delo truda in the editorial hands of Grigorii Maksimov. Under Maksimov, the publication took on a notable syndicalist stance while also offering a platform to other anarchist tendencies, becoming the Russian anarchist exiles' most important publication. Maksimov attempted to bridge the divide between the anarcho-syndicalists and anarcho-communists, publishing a social credo that attempted to synthesise the two along the lines of Peter Kropotkin's earlier works. Maksimov suggested the establishment of agricultural cooperatives and factory committees that could oversee the improvement of conditions and reduction of working hours during the transition to communism, the replacement of prisons with public welfare institutions and disbandment of standing armies in favor of a "people's militia", and the taking over of product distribution by a network of housing and consumer cooperatives. He also denounced the Communist International and claimed that the IWA was the true successor to the First International of Karl Marx and Mikhail Bakunin, due to their adherence to the idea that "the liberation of the working class is the task of the workers themselves", condemning centralization as leading inevitably to bureaucracy - as evidenced by the events in Russia. In his later years, Maksimov published his history of the Soviet Union The Guillotine at Work and edited the collected works of Mikhail Bakunin.

The remnants of the Russian anarchist exiles began to wane during the 1930s, as their journals became less frequent and filled with republications of old texts, their activities mostly consisted of celebrating the anniversaries of past events and their criticisms became increasingly levelled at Joseph Stalin and Adolf Hitler. The events of the Spanish Revolution briefly revived the exile movement, but after the defeat of the Republicans in the Spanish Civil War, the exiles largely ceased activity. During this period a number of the exiled anarchist old guard began to die off, including Alexander Berkman and Emma Goldman during the late 1930s, and Voline, Alexander Schapiro and Grigorii Maksimov in the wake of the Allied victory in World War II. The surviving Abba Gordin had since shifted away from communism, publishing a critique of Marxism in 1940 that concluded it was an ideology of "a privileged class of politico-economic organisateurs" rather than of workers, and further characterized the Russian Revolution as a "managerial revolution". Gordin increasingly gravitated towards nationalism, culminating in his adoption of Zionism and his eventual emigration to Israel, where he would die in 1964.

=== In the Soviet Union ===
==== Under the NEP ====
Following the suppression of the Kronstadt rebellion, the Communist Party's 10th Congress implemented the New Economic Policy (NEP), which put an end to war communism and transformed the Soviet economy into a form of state capitalism. Many of the "Soviet anarchists" that had previously sought conciliation with the Bolshevik government quickly became disillusioned with the policies of the NEP, which they regarded as a step back from their revolutionary aims, and subsequently resigned from their posts in order to pursue scholarly activities.

The Congress also instituted the suppression of any remaining opposition to Bolshevik rule, which banned internal party factions such as the Workers' Opposition and ordered a purge of anarchist and syndicalist elements. Anarchists were rounded up by the Cheka and tried by a Revolutionary Tribunal, with many either being sentenced to internal exile or sent to concentration camps, where they endured harsh living conditions. Anarchist political prisoners in the Solovki prison camp protested their internment with a series of hunger strikes, some even committing self-immolation, which led to their removal from the Solovetsky Islands and their dispersal to various other Gulags in the Urals and Siberia. Some key figures of the anarchist old guard began to die off during this period, including Peter Kropotkin, Varlam Cherkezishvili, Jan Wacław Machajski and Apollon Karelin.

The Bolshevik government did allow some anarchist activity to continue peacefully through the 1920s. The bookshop owned by Golos truda remained open and published Mikhail Bakunin's collected works, the work of the Kropotkin Museum was allowed to continue without interference, and a number of prominent anarchists secured permission to publicly protest against the execution of the Italian American anarchists Nicola Sacco and Bartolomeo Vanzetti. However, by 1928 a factional dispute had broken out over control of the Kropotkin Museum, in spite of Kropotkin's widow Sofia's attempts to secure the museum's future, and the following year the establishments owned by Golos truda were permanently closed down by the authorities. The Tolstoyan movement was also forced to relocate its Life and Labor Commune to Siberia, where a number of their members were arrested.

==== Under Stalinism ====
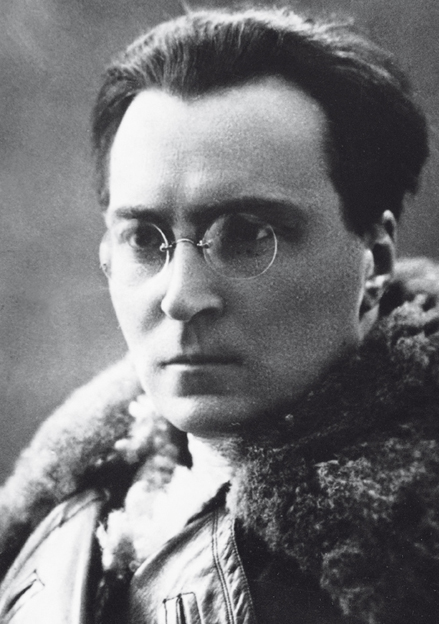
Victor Serge, libertarian socialist member of the Left Opposition to Stalinism.

Following the establishment of the Soviet Union, Vladimir Lenin was left incapacitated by a stroke and a Troika made up of Lev Kamenev, Joseph Stalin and Grigory Zinoviev assumed control of the state. The Troika government was briefly opposed by the council communists of the Workers' Group, but they were swiftly expelled from the Communist Party and eventually repressed entirely. When Lenin died of his ailments, a power struggle broke out between the Communist Party's various factions: the right-wing led by Nikolai Bukharin, the centre led by the Troika and the left-wing led by Leon Trotsky.

When Stalin allied himself with the right-wing policy of socialism in one country, the Troika broke up, with Kamenev and Zinoviev forming a "United Opposition" in coalition with the left-wing. The Opposition demanded freedom of expression within the party, called for an end to the New Economic Policy (NEP), and proposed the rapid industrialization of the economy and a reduction of state bureaucracy. The "anarcho-Bolshevik" Victor Serge subsequently joined the Opposition upon his return to the country, but predicted its defeat at the hands of reactionary forces within the party. The Opposition was defeated at the 15th Party Congress, with many of its members being expelled from the party and forced into exile, where Serge became an outspoken critic of the authoritarian way that Stalin governed the country - describing the Soviet government as "totalitarian". The anarcho-syndicalist Maksim Rayevsky, who had previously edited Golos truda and Burevestnik, was also arrested for publishing the Opposition's platform.

With the Opposition purged, Joseph Stalin had completed his rise to power. He subsequently broke with the New Economic Policy (NEP) and shifted the economy towards a five-year plan of rapid industrialization and forced collectivization, marking the beginning of the Stalinist era. The introduction of totalitarianism in the Soviet Union brought a quick end to the anarchist activity that had been tolerated during the 1920s under the NEP, as a new wave of political repression was unleashed, with many anarchists being arrested and internally exiled to Siberia and Central Asia. While internally exiled in Tobolsk, the anarchist Dmitri Venediktov was arrested on the charges of "Disseminating rumors about loans and dissatisfaction with the Soviet regime", and within three days was sentenced to execution without appeal.

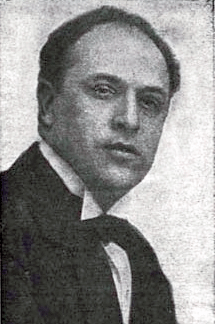
Alexei Borovoi, individualist anarchist victim of the Great Purge.

During the Great Purge, many that had participated in the Revolution were arrested and executed, including a number of Old Bolsheviks, Trotskyists and anarchists. A number of members of the anarchist old guard such as Alexander Atabekian, German Askarov and Alexei Borovoi were noted to have died during the Purge, with others such as Aron Baron disappearing upon their release from prison. Even Efim Iarchuk and Peter Arshinov, who had both experienced a rapprochement with the Bolsheviks and returned to the Soviet Union, also disappeared during the Purge. By 1937, the Life and Labor Commune had been converted into a state-owned collective farm, its members were arrested and sent to labor camps, with their settlements disbanded entirely. And by 1938, the few remaining people that were maintaining the Kropotkin Museum had themselves become subject to repression, leading to the museum's closure following the death of Sofia Kropotkin.

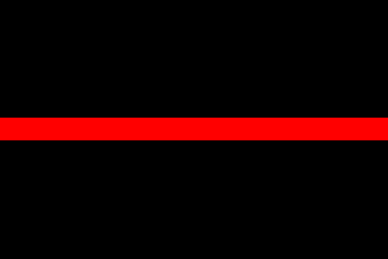
Flag of the Norilsk uprising.

But despite the elimination of the anarchist old guard during the Purge, anarchist activity continued at a reduced scale. A new generation of anarchists emerged within the Gulags, with some participating in a 15-day hunger strike at the Penalty Isolator in Yaroslavl. Following the Allied victory in World War II, many POWs that were freed by the Red Army were subsequently met with deportation to Gulag camps in Siberia. There, a number of Marxist and anarchist POWs established the Democratic Movement of Northern Russia, which organized an uprising in 1947 that spread throughout several camps before being suppressed by the army. Anarchist tendencies subsequently spread throughout many of the Siberian camps, culminating in 1953 when the death of Stalin brought with it a wave of uprisings, some of which included anarchist participation. The Norilsk uprising, in particular, saw the active participation of a number of Ukrainian Makhnovists.

==== During the Thaw ====
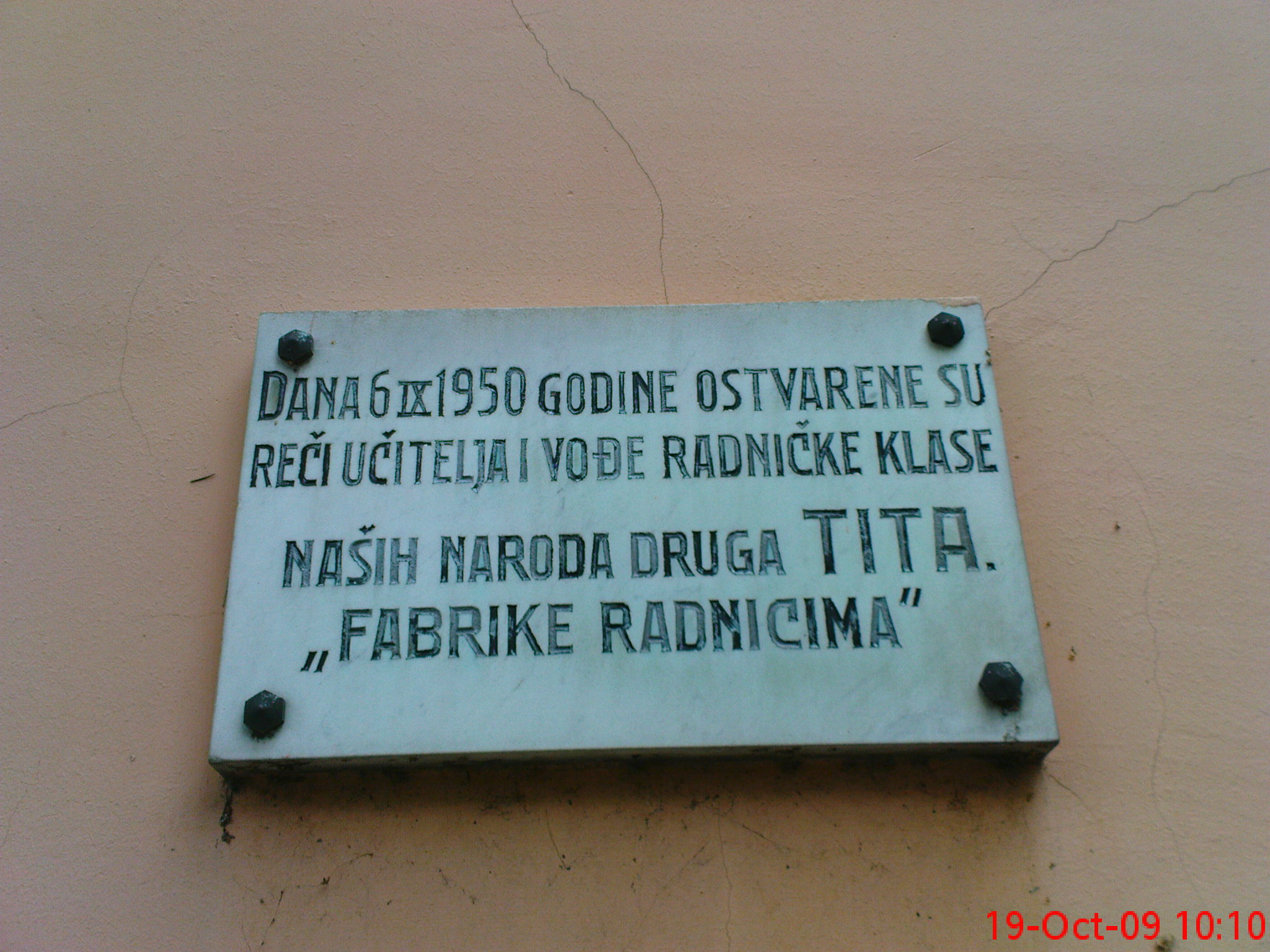
"Fabrike radnicima" ("Factories to the workers") was the slogan of the Yugoslav socialist self-management system which inspired later-Soviet libertarian communists

The power struggle that followed in the wake of Stalin's death ended with the consolidation of control by Nikita Khrushchev, who implemented a reform program that relaxed political repression and censorship, released millions of political prisoners from the Gulag and instituted a de-Stalinization of Soviet society. A dissident protest movement began to emerge in the public sphere for the first time in decades, with a number of libertarian communists inspired by Yugoslavian socialist self-management developing anti-statist tendencies and some even going on to call themselves anarchists.

Khrushchev launched a crackdown on the nascent anarchist movement, with many of the new generation ending up in Gulag camps, often under the charge of "anti-Soviet propaganda". Given that openly identifying as an anarchist was dangerous, some anarchists identified themselves with the emerging human rights movement. Anarchists in Leningrad were arrested for providing aid to the dissident Yuri Galanskov and one anarchist dock worker was arrested for agitating among his colleagues.

==== During the Era of Stagnation ====
During the era of Stagnation, a new group known as the "Left Opposition" was established by a collective of Leningrad students in 1978. Led by the libertarian socialist, Alexander Skobov, they established a commune in the city, which acted as a meeting place for left-wing Soviet dissidents, and published their own journal Perspektivy. The journal published articles by a number of different authors of various tendencies, including anarchist authors like Mikhail Bakunin, Peter Kropotkin and Daniel Cohn-Bendit, as well as Marxist authors like Leon Trotsky and Herbert Marcuse. The ideas published in their programme were characterized as "ultra-left", positioning itself against the Soviet state and in favor of freedom of association and the right to self-determination. Some more radical members of the group, inspired by the Red Army Faction, even called for the use of armed struggle and illegalist methods against the state, but its leaders Arkady Tsurkov and Alexander Skobov encouraged nonviolence. The group planned to organize a conference that would bring together leftist dissident groups from throughout the Union, but the planned conference was postponed by an orthodox Marxist group and eventually called off entirely due to political repression preventing delegates from arriving. The commune was raided, their members followed and their leaders sentenced to years in the Gulag.

The red and black flag of anarcho-syndicalism, which saw a resurgence in Russia during the 1980s.

As the Communist Party began to lose its grip on power, and in the face of rising nationalism, Russian anarchists called for decentralization and federalism as a way forward, once again proposing Mikhail Bakunin's earlier model for re-organising the region into a "loose federation of autonomous republics." But following the 1991 Soviet coup d'état attempt, during which members of the Confederation of Anarcho-Syndicalists (KAS) defended a barricade at the White House, the dissolution of the Soviet Union took effect and the Russian Federation was established.

=== Russian Federation ===
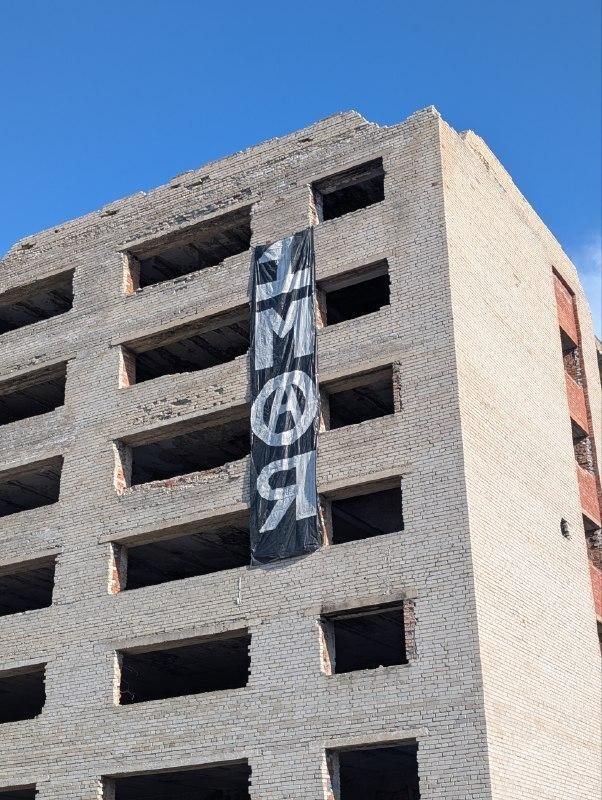
Banner by anarchists in Novosibirsk on 1st of May 2026

Contemporary anarchist groups in Russia include the Confederation of Revolutionary Anarcho-Syndicalists (KRAS-MAT) and the libertarian communist Autonomous Action, both of which advocate direct action, strikes, and anti-Fascist actions. The Siberian Confederation of Labour connects anarcho-syndicalists across Russia. Between 800 and 1,000 Russians were estimated to be active anarchists in the early 2010s.

Autonomous Action (Russian:Автономное действие) played a major role in the 2011-2013 Russian protest movement against the regime of Vladimir Putin. In August 2013, at the XII Congress of Autonomous Action there was an intra-organizational conflict that grew into a split in the organization. For several months, two organizations were operating in Russia bearing the name "Autonomous Action" and standing on similar libertarian-communist positions. However, on October 27, 2013, the breakaway group adopted the name Autonomous Action (Social-Revolutionary) (ADSR). (later this organization was renamed "People's Self-Defense")

On October 31, 2018, Mikhail Zhlobitsky, a seventeen-year-old college student, committed a suicide bombing against a local FSB headquarters in Arkhangelsk. In a social media message allegedly posted by Zholbitsky prior to the attack stated that he was an anarcho-communist and carried out the attack against the FSB due to their persistent use of torture and evidence fabrication.

==== Russo-Ukrainian War ====
Anarchists have played a significant role in Russian opposition to the 2022 invasion of Ukraine, including the 2022 military commissariats arsons. The Insider has named the Combat Organization of Anarcho-Communists "the most active 'subversive' force" in the country since the beginning of the invasion. On 19 April 2023, Dmitry Petrov, one of the organisation's founders, was killed in the battle of Bakhmut while fighting for the Ukrainian Territorial Defense Forces.

== Notable anarchists ==
- Peter Arshinov
- Anastasia Baburova
- Mikhail Bakunin
- Aida Basevich
- Alexei Borovoi
- Lev Chernyi
- Vladimir Chertkov
- Sam Dolgoff
- Vera Figner
- Aleksandr Ge
- Emma Goldman
- Juda Grossman
- Apollon Karelin
- Peter Kropotkin
- Anna Kuliscioff
- Anatoly Lamanov
- Nestor Makhno
- Grigorii Maksimov
- Stepan Petrichenko
- Boris Pilnyak
- Dmitry Ivanovich Popov
- Victor Serge
- Leo Tolstoy
- Volin

== Organizations ==
- Land and Liberty (1876–1879)
- People's Will (1879–1887)
- Chernoe Znamia (1903–?)
- Moscow Federation of Anarchist Groups (1917–1918)
- Black Guards (1917–1919)
- Universalists (1920–1921)
- Confederation of Anarcho-Syndicalists (1988–1995)
- Siberian Confederation of Labour (1995–present)
- Confederation of Revolutionary Anarcho-Syndicalists (1995–present)
- New Revolutionary Alternative (1996–2000)
- Autonomous Action (2002–present)
- People's Self-Defense (2013–present)
- Combat Organization of Anarcho-Communists (2018–present)

== See also ==
- Category:Russian anarchists
- List of anarchist movements by region
- Anarchism in Belarus
- Anarchism in Mongolia
- Anarchism in Ukraine
- History of communism in the Soviet Union
- Kronstadt rebellion
- Makhnovshchina
- Platformism

== Bibliography ==
- Avrich, Paul (1966). "Anarchism and Anti-Intellectualism in Russia". Journal of the History of Ideas. 27 (3). Philadelphia: University of Pennsylvania Press: 381–90. doi:10.2307/2708592. ISSN 0022-5037. JSTOR 2708592. LCCN 42051802. OCLC 884607792.
- Avrich, Paul (1967). "The Anarchists in the Russian Revolution". The Russian Review. 26 (4). Hoboken, New Jersey: Wiley-Blackwell: 341–350. doi:10.2307/126893. ISSN 0036-0341. JSTOR 126893. LCCN 43016148. OCLC 473067959.
- Avrich, Paul (1968). "Russian Anarchists and the Civil War". The Russian Review. 27 (3). Hoboken, New Jersey: Wiley-Blackwell: 296–306. doi:10.2307/127258. ISSN 0036-0341. JSTOR 127258. LCCN 43016148. OCLC 473067959.
- Avrich, Paul (1971) [1967]. The Russian Anarchists. Princeton: Princeton University Press. ISBN 0-691-00766-7. OCLC 1154930946.
- Avrich, Paul (1984). "Bolshevik Opposition to Lenin: G. T. Miasnikov and the Workers' Group". The Russian Review. 43 (1). Hoboken, New Jersey: Wiley-Blackwell: 1–29. doi:10.2307/129715. ISSN 0036-0341. JSTOR 129715. LCCN 43016148. OCLC 473067959. Archived from the original on 3 May 2012.
- Iztok (1980). "On anarchism in the USSR (1921–1979)". Iztok: Periodično spisanie (1). Paris: Les Amitiés franco-bulgares. ISSN 0816-8172. OCLC 664426218.
- Goldberg, Joel Harold (1973). The Anarchists View the Bolshevik Regime, 1918–1922 (PhD). Madison: University of Wisconsin. OCLC 36688081.
- Goodwin, James (2010). Confronting Dostoevsky's Demons: Anarchism and the Specter of Bakunin in Twentieth-century Russia. Peter Lang. p. 48. ISBN 978-1-4331-0883-9.
- Grossman, Henryk (30 November 2020). Henryk Grossman Works, Volume 2: Political Writings. BRILL. ISBN 978-90-04-43211-6.
- Marshall, Peter (2008) [1992]. Demanding the Impossible: A History of Anarchism. London: Harper Perennial. ISBN 978-0-00-686245-1. OCLC 1112925421.
- McClellan, Woodford (1979). Revolutionary exiles: the Russians in the First International and the Paris Commune. Cass. ISBN 0-203-98802-7. OCLC 243606265.
- McNeal, Robert (1974). Resolutions and decisions of the Communist Party of the Soviet Union. Toronto: University of Toronto Press. ISBN 0-8020-2157-3. OCLC 1189903.
- Ruff, Philip (1991). Anarchy in the USSR. London: AK Press. ISBN 9781872258065. OCLC 36919582. Archived from the original on 2021-08-09.
- Solzhenitsyn, Aleksandr (2007a) [1974]. The Gulag Archipelago. Vol. 1. Translated by Whitney, Thomas P. Harper & Row. ISBN 978-0061253713.
- Solzhenitsyn, Aleksandr (2007b) [1974]. The Gulag Archipelago. Vol. 2. Translated by Whitney, Thomas P. Harper & Row. ISBN 978-0061253720.
- Solzhenitsyn, Aleksandr (2007c) [1974]. The Gulag Archipelago. Vol. 3. Translated by Whitney, Thomas P. Harper & Row. ISBN 978-0061253737.
- Yarmolinsky, Avrahm (2014) [1957]. Road to Revolution: A Century of Russian Radicalism. Princeton, New Jersey: Princeton University Press. ISBN 978-0691610412. OCLC 890439998.
