= Hajime Kawakami =

Japanese economist (1879–1946)

- 河上 肇
- Born: 20 October 1879; Nishikimi, Yamaguchi, Empire of Japan
- Died: 30 January 1946 (aged 66); Kyoto, Japan
- Political party: Labour-Farmer; New Labour-Farmer; Communist
- Spouse: Hide Otsuka
- Children: 3

Education
- Education: Tokyo Imperial University

Philosophical work
- Main interests: Philosophy; economics

Hajime Kawakami (河上 肇, Kawakami Hajime; 20 October 1879 – 30 January 1946) was a Japanese professor and economist who studied Marxism and was active in Japanese communism. He was the editor and publisher of multiple magazines and journals and his academic work includes translations of the works of Edwin R. A. Seligman, Irving Fisher, Nicolaas Pierson, and Das Kapital.

Born to a retainer for the Kikkawa clan and municipal official, Kawakami was raised and educated in Iwakuni and Yamaguchi. He graduated from Tokyo Imperial University in 1902 and became a professor at the university. Kawakami left the university to join Itō Shōshin's Garden of Selflessness after being inspired by Arnold Toynbee and Leo Tolstoy. He lived with the sect for two months before returning to Tokyo.

Kawakami received a job at the Kyoto Imperial University in 1908 and became a professor in 1915. He studied in Europe shortly before and during the outbreak of World War I and wrote Tale of Poverty in response to the wealth inequality he witnessed. He started studying Marxism in 1919 and reorganised his lecture around the writings of Karl Marx in 1927.

Ikuo Oyama and the Labour-Farmer Party were supported by Kawakami during the 1928 Japanese general election, but the party was suppressed after the March 15 incident and Kawakami was fired from the university. Kawakami was arrested for his political activities multiple times. He was a candidate of the New Labour-Farmer Party in the 1930 Japanese general election. He joined the Japanese Communist Party in 1932 and was the editor of Shimbun Akahata. The police arrested Kawakami in 1933, and he was sentenced to prison for five years. He was released in 1937 and spent the remainder of his life writing poetry and his autobiography.

== Early life and education ==
Hajime Kawakami was born in Nishikimi, on 20 October 1879, to Sunao Kawakami and Tazu Matasaburō. The 30-year-old Sunao and 16-year-old Tazu, who were distant relatives, divorced after nine months. Hajime was born four months after his parents divorced. Sunao, who remarried before Hajime's birth, took Hajime from Tazu.

Sunao was raised in poverty as his father Sai'ichirō died when he was five and Sunao was not eligible for his father's stipend until he reached the age of 20. Sunao became a retainer for the Kikkawa clan and fought against the Tokugawa shogunate during the Meiji Restoration. After the restoration he was made village chief of Nishikimi. Sunao served as village chief until 1889, when Nishikimi and Iwakuni were merged together and he was elected to lead the new town. He retired from this position in 1905, and worked as a steward for the Kikkawa family for twenty years.

Kawakami was raised by his stepmother, grandmother, and wet nurse. His wet nurse was dismissed after his grandmother discovered she had difficulties breastfeeding and had asthma. Tazu came back into Hajime's household when he was two years old. However, he was raised by Tazu's mother-in-law Iwa while Tazu raised Nobusuke, his half-brother. Epilepsy was present in other members of the Kawakami family and Hajime later believed that tantrums he had as a child were instead epileptic attacks.

At age 4 Kawakami started his education in Nishikimi. This was one year earlier than normal and might have been due to his father also serving as head of the school. He was not promoted to the next grade after his first year and required private tutoring. He was educated at the Iwakuni School from age 8 to 13. Kawakami and his friend published a weekly magazine titled Kaihō. He graduated from the Iwakuni School in 1893 and left home to study at the Yamaguchi Middle and High School in Yamaguchi.

During Kawakami's last year at high school he transferred from the literature department to law despite opposition from school officials and his German language teacher. In September 1898, Kawakami was admitted to the political science department of the law faculty of Tokyo Imperial University. This was the first time that he travelled outside of his home province and for the next ten years he was in Tokyo, four for education and six after graduation. His uncle Kin'ichi, who was a graduate of the university's first senior class in 1879 and director of The Sumitomo Bank, paid for Kawakami's tuition. Kawakami was critical of his economic professors as according to him their teaching was simply standing at lectures and reading translated notes of Gustav von Schönberg. He graduated 6th in his class in 1902.

== Career ==
=== Tokyo Imperial University ===
After graduating from college Kawakami attempted to meet Kinoshita Naoe and gain a job at The Mainichi, but his uncle refused to allow him to meet Naoe. Matsuzaki Kuranosuke, one of his university teachers, helped Kawakami become employed teaching agricultural economics in the faculty of agriculture.

Biographers of Kawakami and Kawakami himself dismiss his early writings on economics, when he was influenced by the German school of nationalist economics, as unoriginal. The 1905 translation of Edwin R. A. Seligman's Economic Interpretation of History by Kawakami was praised by academics, including Sakuzō Yoshino, and it brought attention to the concept of economic determinism. Kawakami was the editor of the Kokka gakkai zasshi (National Academic Society) magazine. He published his first book, Keizaigaku jō no kompon kannen (Fundamental Principles of Political Economics), at his own expense in 1905.

=== Garden of Selflessness ===
During Kawakami's studies he discovered the life of Arnold Toynbee, an economics professor who quit his job to teach the poor in a slum district. Leo Tolstoy's My Religion made Kawakami feel "as though I had been struck by electricity". Several days after reading My Religion Kawakami read the religious tract Selfless Love by Itō Shōshin, the founder of the communal sect Garden of Selflessness (Muga En). He met with Itō three days later on 4 December 1905. Itō had trained for the priesthood of Pure Land Buddhism, but he suffered a religious crisis that caused him to leave Pure Land Buddhism and form the Garden of Selflessness, which combined Buddhism, Christianity, and Tolstoy's humanism, in Sugamo in 1905. Kawakami met with Itō twice and was convinced to abandon economics for teaching philosophy.

Under the pen name Zenzan Bansuirō, Kawakami wrote a series of articles for Yomiuri titled Shakaishugi hyōron (Critique of socialism). The 36th installment of this was a public letter in which he revealed his true name and announced that he would proselytize the "truth of selfless love" rather than write. In December 1905, Kawakami resigned from his post to teach to the poor. He gave up his apartment and sold all of his books except for Tōson Shimazaki's Young Greens. He lived with the Garden of Selflessness for two months and built a house near the main hall.

Itō mentored Kawakami, but Kawakami soon came to disagree with him. Itō's idea of selfless love called for people to accept the world as it was which was in contrast to Kawakami's desire to reform society. On 6 February 1906, he left the sect and returned to Tokyo.

=== Kyoto Imperial University and Marxism ===
An unemployed Kawakami became a journalist in 1907, and took over the magazine Nihon keizai shinshi (New Magazine of Japanese Economics) from Matsuzaki. A faculty member at Kyoto Imperial University became ill and Kawakami accepted an offer to replace him in 1908. He became a lecturer at the university in 1908, and then an assistant professor in 1909. Gail Lee Bernstein wrote that Kawakmai's time in Kyoto was the most tranquil time of his life. He translated books by Irving Fisher and Nicolaas Pierson during his first year in Kyoto.

The Ministry of Education awarded Kawakami a scholarship to study abroad in 1913, and he returned two years later. He sought to study German idealism in Germany. He could not bring his family with him as the grant was too small. Sailing from Kobe for two months he arrived in Brussels in January 1914, and then spent two months in Paris. Kawakami became more nationalist during his time in Paris and noted that the city flourished due to its tourism, but this caused the decadence of the city. During his time in Paris he was able to meet with Shimazaki several times. Kawakami was in Berlin for two months before being forced to leave on 15 August 1914, due to the outbreak of World War I. He arrived in London on 18 August and remained there for two months for returning to Japan. He was promoted to professor in March 1915, and was elected as a Kyoto Imperial University councillor in May 1919.

After returning to Japan Kawakami started work on a series of articles in Asahi that would become Bimbō monogatari (Tale of Poverty). He was critical of wealth inequality in the west; Japanese economists viewed poverty as a sign of underdevelopment. Ōuchi Hyōei stated that Kawakami's work told his generation of the existence of poverty in Japan. The book was a bestseller and was reprinted 30 times by 1919.

Kushida Tamizo, a pupil of Kawakami, criticised his theory of poverty as laid out in Tale of Poverty. Kawakami wrote that the wealthy purchasing luxury goods help caused poverty, but Tamizo believed it was due to the exploitation of the workers by capitalists and that individual morality could not solve poverty. Tamizo's criticism caused Kawakami to reconsider his beliefs.

Kawakami started studying Marxism in 1919. His tenure at the university meant that he was able to study Marxism unlike other Japanese figures, such as Hitoshi Yamakawa and Sakai Toshihiko, who were censored. Material from Das Kapital was added to his course in 1919, but he did not reorganise his lecture around Karl Marx's writing until 1927.

In January 1919, Kawakami started publishing his own journal, Shakai mondai kenkyū (Research of Social Problems), and devoted the first ten issues to historical materialism, class warfare, and the labor theory of value. The circulation of Research of Social Problems rose to 20,000 by middle of the year. Kawakami faced censorship, such as his article on the Russian Revolution of 1905 being censored after its publication in April 1921. Research of Social Problems ended publication in 1926.

Economics was within the law department of Kyoto Imperial University until it was given its own department in 1919. Kawakami was the chair of the faculty of economics until he resigned due to health reasons in 1924. The Peace Preservation Law resulted in more students being arrested at Kyoto Imperial University than any other university and Kawakami's house was searched, but he was not arrested.

=== Suppression and prison ===
Ikuo Oyama, a colleague with whom Kawakami wrote articles and journals, ran as a Labour-Farmer Party candidate in the 1928 Japanese general election. Kawakami helped campaign for Oyama during the election. Oyama lost, but Chōzaburō Mizutani, one of Kawakami's students, was elected to the National Diet. After the election the Labour-Farmer Party was suppressed and left-wingers were suppressed across Japan's universities. Kawakami was fired from the university during the March 15 incident for campaigning for Oyama.

In December 1928, Kawakami attended a reorganisation of the Labour-Farmer Party in Tokyo, but he and other attendees were arrested. He was in a jail for half a day before being released. In February 1929, Kawakami was arrested at a meeting of the All-Nation Farmers' Union, but a group of people from the All-Nation Farmers' Union led by Diet member Yamamoto Senji successfully demanded Kawakami's release. Senji was murdered by right-wingers on 5 March 1929, and Kawakami gave the funeral oration.

The New Labour-Farmer Party (Shin Rōnōtō) was established in November 1929, with Oyama as Central Committee chair and Kawakami as editor and financier of the party's newspapers. The party participated in the 1930 election and Kawakami moved to Tokyo one month before the election to aid the party's campaign and also ran as the party's candidate in Kyoto's 5th Ward. Kawakami lost, but Oyama was elected. However, Kawakami became disillusioned with the party as he knew that Oyama was not a communist.

The Communist International called for the Japanese Communist Party to be reformed. In 1930, Kawakami proposed that the New Labour-Farmer Party be dissolved so that its members could join the Communist Party. Kawakami stated that breaking from Oyama was "one of the most despairing periods of my whole career." Kawakami joined the Communist Party in October 1932.

Kawakami worked on a translation of Das Kapital for multiple years before its publication in 1931. He used royalty payments from the book to fund the Communist Party. The Communist International had Kawakami translate Theses in 1932, and it was published in Shimbun Akahata using the pseudonym Honda Kōzō.

On 8 August 1932, Kawakami was alerted by his brother-in-law Otsuka Yusho of an incoming police raid against Communist Party members. For the next four months Kawakami used multiple party hiding places while serving as editor of Shimbun Akahata. On 6 October 1932, Otsuka participated in the Omori bank robbery to gain funds for the party. Otsuka avoided arrest, but ended his direct contact with Kawakami due to manhunt for him.

Matsumura Noburu was made the intermediary between Kawakami and the party. Matsumura was an agent for the government. Otsuka was arrested after a meeting with Matsumura on 5 January 1933. Otsuka, knowing that Matsumura was an informant, determined it was pointless to continue hiding Kawakami. He informed the police of Kawakami's location in exchange for being allowed to send a note to him. Kawakami was arrested without incident after hiding for 122 days.

In August 1933, Kawakami was convicted for violating the Peace Preservation Law and sentenced to five years' imprisonment. Many imprisoned communists recanted their beliefs, such as Manabu Sano, but Kawakami did not. He was released from prison on 15 June 1937. During his time in prison he suffered from malnutrition and chronic stomach ailments.

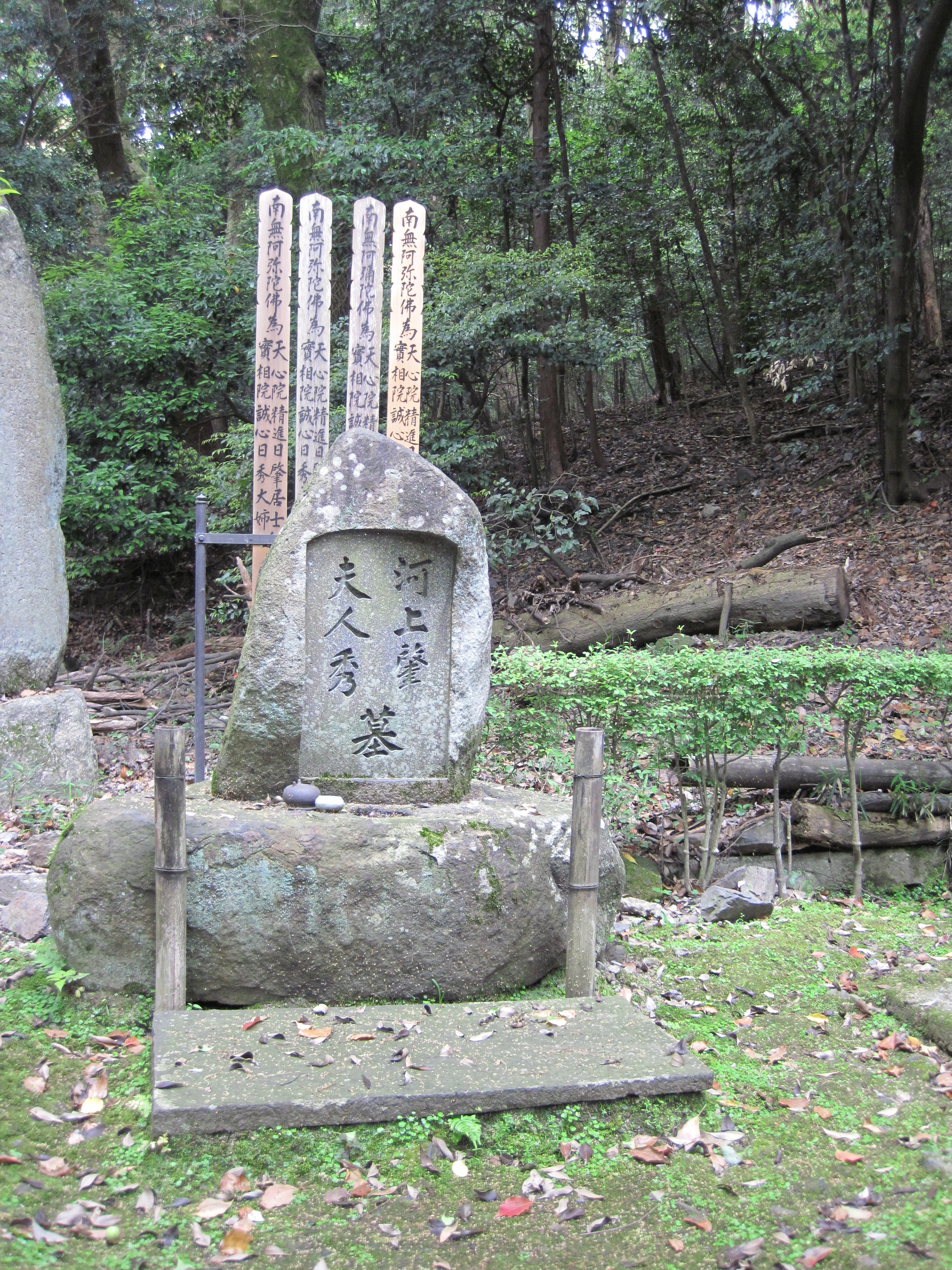
The grave of Hajime Kawakami

After being released from prison Kawakami spent the remainder of his life writing poetry and an autobiography. On the Death Bed, a poem by Kawakami and his last work, was published in Shimbun Akahata shortly before his death. On 30 January 1946, Kawakami died in Kyoto.

== Legacy ==
Seigen Tanaka, who led militant communists in battles with the police, was moved by the humanism of Kawakami's The Story of the Poor and was "touched by its unselfish love". Itsurō Sakisaka read Tale of Poverty in high school and found it "so absorbing". Guo Moruo stated that he became a Marxist after reading one of Kawakami's books in 1924. Zhou Fohai (one of the founders of the Chinese Communist Party), Li Da, and Horie Muraichi were some of Kawakmai's students.

Daisuke Nanba, who attempted to assassinate Crown Prince Hirohito, was inspired by Kawakami's articles on figures in the Russian Revolution of 1905. Nanba visited Kawakami's house before the assassination attempt.

As of 1990, there were Kawakami Hajime Commemorative Societies in Tokyo and Kyoto with around 100 members that met three times a year on the dates of Kawakami's birth, death, and release from prison.

== Personal life ==
In 1902, Kawakami went to Iwakuni for his arranged marriage to Hide Otsuka and they returned to Tokyo after the marriage. Otsuka's family, like the Kawakami, were lower-ranking officials in the service of the Kikkawa and fought during the Meiji Restoration. The couple had three children. Otsuka, who was pregnant with their second child, was sent by Kawakami to live with his parents in 1905 so that he could focus on his economic studies. Their son Masao suffered from heart disease and died in 1926.

=== Religion ===
After Sunao's death he was given a posthumous Buddhist name by Kawakami. Religion did not play a major role in Kawakami's youth and his family's Buddhist activities were mostly perfunctory according to him. Uchimura Kanzō's Seisho no Kenkyū (Study of the Bible) caused a Christian religious awakening in Kawakami. The passage for turning the other cheek "penetratingly moved my heart and pierced my soul" according to Kawakami. He believed that the ethos of the shishi resonated with the Sermon on the Mount.

Flooding of the Ashio Copper Mine in 1896 caused ecological problems for the 13,000 farms in the region. Shōzō Tanaka brought the government's failure to aid the farmers to light. Fundraising for the victims was conducted by multiple groups, including the Christian Ladies Moral Reform Society. In 1902, Kawakami attended a fundraiser by the Christian Ladies Moral Reform Society and donated all of his belongings in accordance with the message of the Sermon on the Mount. This incident was reported on in newspapers and Kawakami was criticised by his friends and mother.

== Influences ==
During Kawakami's secondary education he read copies of Fukuzawa Yukichi's Jiji Shinpō sent to him by his Kin'ichi. Iwa took Kawakami to see speeches by Fukuzawa. While in Yamaguchi he subscribed to Yomiuri to monitor current affairs.

Kawakami started using the pen name Fugetsu while in Yamaguchi. This name was created by combining the ideograms for maple, representing his birth month of October, and the last part of author Keigetsu Omachi's name. He later used the pen name Baiin in honour of Yoshida Shōin. Baiin was derived from the ideograms for plum tree, which was present in the Kawakami family garden, and the second part of Shōin's name. He regularly visited the shrine dedicated to Shōin and pasted copies of his writings onto his wall.

Kawakami read the literary works of Shimazaki, Tekkan Yosano, Doppo Kunikida, Katai Tayama, Ichiyō Higuchi, and Doi Bansui. Inoue Kowashi's Kokugo no tame ni (On Behalf of the Mother Tongue), in which he wrote about the virtue of the Japanese language, furthered Kawakami's interest in literature.

Kinoshita was idolized by Kawakami, who viewed speeches by him while studying in Tokyo.

== Thought ==
Satō Nobuhiro, a figure from the Tokugawa Shogunate, was described as a socialist by Kawakami in 1909. Kawakami compared the beliefs of Mencius to Marx as Mencius discussed how the moral education of the masses required their economic well-being. He viewed John Ruskin and John Stuart Mill as forerunners to socialism.

Economic considerations being the sole driving force behind thoughts and actions was rejected by Kawakami, who believed that an ethical awakening of individuals was needed for reform. Sakai criticised Kawakami for his "incomplete blend of humanist philosophy and socialist economics" and that his work implied the existence of unchanging morality. Kawakami responded to Sakai stating that morality may change over time, but an underlying continuity existed.

In 1921, Kawakami wrote that conditions in Japan were similar to conditions in Russia during the 1905 revolution.

=== Poverty ===
Thomas Robert Malthus and Malthusianism caused dismay in Kawakami in his 20s and caused him to write a letter to Sen Katayama about his doubts in pursuing an economic career. Kawakami wrote in Tale of Poverty that Malthusianism did not explain poverty and that industrialization meant that productivity could outpace population increase. He viewed self-interest and economic individualism as the cause of poverty and that poverty could only be eliminated by ending luxuries and the misuse of resources.

According to Kawakami the "economics borne of Adam Smith has already completed its mission and now is truly the time when a new economics is to be born." Kawakami proposed the nationalization of industry and the distribution of wealth as solutions to poverty. He noted the social welfare policies of David Lloyd George, including school lunch and old-age pensions, and Germany taking control over bread production in 1915.

=== Western civilization ===
Kawakami viewed the west as materialistic unlike Japan. The cultural genius of the west was expressed in rationalism, science, and architecture while Japan expressed it in zen and haiku. The analytical culture of the west was easy to understand, but Japan had subtlety and vagueness

Kawakami was critical of the United Kingdom. The lack of city planning that produced a disorganised street system. Terms like Chancellor of the Exchequer and Keeper of the Privy Seal were confusing as they could not be easily translated into Japanese as they grew beyond their original meaning. The House of Commons's slow deliberations reminded him of faculty meetings in Kyoto.

Houston Stewart Chamberlain's The Foundations of the Nineteenth Century sparked an interest in Social Darwinism in Kawakami. He believed that the English became the ruling civilization in Europe as they initially mixed multiple racial groups, but developed a pure mixture as an isolated island. The purity of the Japanese people was a reason for why Japan became a major power in East Asia and Japan was a middle ground that was neither European or Asian.

== Bibliography ==
- Keizaigaku jō no kompon kannen (Fundamental Principles of Political Economics). 1905.
- Nihon sonnō ron (On the Reverence for Agriculture in Japan). 1905.
- Keizaigaku genron (Theories of Political Economics). 1905.
- Nihon nōseijaku (Agricultural management in Japan). 1906.
- Shakaishugi hyōron (Criticique of socialism). Yomiuri. 1906.
- Jinsei no kisū (Trends in life). Yomiuri. 1906.
- Keizai to dōtoku (Economics and morality). New Magazine of Japanese Economics. 1907.
- Shūgi washo ni mirareta Kumazawa Banzan no keizai gakusetsu (Economic theories of Kumazawa Banzan as seen in the Shūgi washo). National Academic Society. 1907.
- Bakumatsu jidai no shakai shugisha Satō Nobuhiro (Satō Nobuhiro, a socialist of the Bakumatsu period). Kyoto Law Society Magazine. 1909.
- Keizai to jinsei (Economics and Human Existence). Jitsugyo no Nihon Sha. 1911.
- Jisei no hen (Trends of the Times). Yomiuri. 1911.
- Dāuinizumu to Marukishizumu (Darwinism and Marxism). Chūō Kōron. 1912.
- Sokoku o kaerimit (Reflections on Our Homeland). Jitsugyo no Nihon Sha. 1915.
- Sumāto no 'Ichi keizai gakusha no daini shisō (Smart's "Second thoughts of an economist"). Keizai Ronso. 1917.
- Bimbō monogatari (Tale of Poverty). Kōbundō. 1917.
- Beika monda (The problem of rice prices). The Asahi Shimbun. 1918.
- Dampen (Fragments). Shakai mondai kenkyū. 1919.
- Shakaishugisha to shite no Zē Esu Miru (J.S. Mill as a socialist). Keizai Ronso. 1919.
- Shakaishugi no shinka (The evolution of socialism). Shakai mondai kenkyū. 1919.
- Marukusu no yuibutsu shikan ni kansuru ichi kōsatsu (An inquiry into Marx's historical materialism). Keizai Ronso. 1919.
- Kahen no dōtoku to fukahen no dōtoku (Changing morality and unchanging morality). Shakai mondai kenkyū. 1919.
- Kinsei keizai shisō shiron (History of modern economic though). Kōbundō. 1920.
- Ningen no jiko manchakusei (Man's self-deceiving nature). Shakai mondai kenkyū. 1920.
- Shin-teki kaizō to butsu-teki kaizō (Spiritual reconstruction and material reconstruction). Shakai mondai kenkyū. 1921.
- Marukusushugi ni yū tokoro no katoki ni tsuite (On the meaning of the "transition period" in Marx). Keizai Ronso. 1921.
- Yuibutsu shikan kenkyū (Studies in historical materialism). Kōbundō. 1921.
- Roshiya kakumei to shakaishugi kakumei (The Russian revolution and socialist revolution). Shakai mondai kenkyū. 1922.
- Keizaigaku no kakumei (The revolution in economics). Keizai Ronso. 1922.
- Marukusu-setsu ni okeru shakai-teki kakumei to seiji-teki kakumei (Social and political revolution in Marx's theories). Shakai mondai kenkyū. 1922.
- Shakai kakumei to shakai seisaku (Social revolution and social policy). Shakai mondai kenkyū. 1922.
- Jiki shōsō-naru shakai kakumei no kuwadate ni tsuite (Plans for a premature social revolution). Keizai Ronso. 1922.
- Shakai soshiki to shakai kakumei (Social organisation and social revolution). Kōbundō. 1922.
- Shihonshugi keizaigaku no shiteki hatten (Historical development of capitalist economics). Kōbundō. 1923.
- Yuibutsu shikan ni kansuru jiko seisan (A personal settlement of accounts with historical materialism). Shakai mondai kenkyū. 1927.
- Keizaigaku taikō (Fundamental principle of economics). Kaizōsha. 1928.
- Marukusushugi keizaigaku no kiso riron (Basic theory of Marxist economics). Kaizōsha. 1928.
- Daini bimbō monogatari (The second tale of poverty). Kaizōsha. 1930.

== Works cited ==
=== Books ===
- Japanese Biographical Archive. K. G. Saur Verlag. 2006.
- Bernstein, Gail (1990). Japanese Marxist: A Portrait Of Kawakami Hajime 1879–1946. Harvard University Press. ISBN 0674471946.
- Boyle, John (1972). China and Japan at War 1937-1945: The Politics of Collaboration. Stanford University Press. ISBN 0804708002.
- Chiang, Howard, ed. (2019). The Making of the Human Sciences in China. Brill Publishers. ISBN 978-90-04-39762-0.
- Fairbank, John; Feuerwerker, Albert, eds. (2008). The Cambridge History of China. Vol. 13. Cambridge University Press. ISBN 978-0521243384.
- Hiratsuka, Raichō (2006). In the Beginning, Woman Was the Sun: The Autobiography of a Japanese Feminist. Columbia University Press. ISBN 0231138121.

=== Journals ===
- Hein, Laura (1998). "Interwar Japanese Economists: How Did They Pick Their Questions?". Journal of Economic Issues. 32 (2). Taylor & Francis: 395–401. doi:10.1080/00213624.1998.11506044. JSTOR 4227314.
- Piovesana, Gino (1964). "Men and Social Ideas of the Early Taishō Period". Monumenta Nipponica. 19 (1). Sophia University: 111–129. doi:10.2307/2383285. JSTOR 2383285.

=== News ===
- "The Late Dr. Kawakami, Hajime" (Press release). Supreme Commander for the Allied Powers. 6 February 1946.
