= Autonomous Action =

Russian anarchist group

- Автономное действие
- Abbreviation: AD
- Established: 25 January 2002; 24 years ago
- Type: Publishing group
- Headquarters: Krasnodar (until 2005); Moscow (from 2005)
- Location: Russia
- Main organ: Avtonom
- Website: avtonom.org

Autonomous Action (Russian: Автономное действие; АД, romanized: Avtonomnoye deystviye; AD) is a Russian libertarian communist publishing group. Established in January 2002 as a federation of anarchist groups, it published the Avtonom magazine, coordinated anti-fascist patrols and organised veches as forms of popular assembly. The organisation faced repression from the Putin administration, which surveilled its members and deported one of its leading organisers. In 2013, the organisation split, with a number of members forming People's Self-Defense (NS). By the end of the 2010s, the organisation had been weakened substantially and reorganised into a small media group, focused on the Avtonom magazine and website.

== History ==
During the 1980s, Russian anarchists formed a number of social networks, which by the 1990s had coalesced into the Russian autonomous movement. In 1995, anarchists in the Kuban region began publishing the magazine Avtonom, which over time expanded to become a periodical that represented the entire Russian autonomous movement. It has since become Russia's oldest continuously-published anarchist periodical, having published 38 issues as of 2019.

From 1999 to 2002, anarchist and environmentalist groups from throughout Russia held a series of meetings, which the aim of forming a national organisation. In January 2002, delegates met at a congress in Nizhny Novgorod, where Autonomous Action (Russian: Автономное действие, romanized: Avtonomnoye Deystviye; AD) was established. In its founding manifesto, the AD proclaimed its opposition to the state and capitalism and its advocacy of libertarian communism. It also emphasised its opposition to fascism, racism and nationalism, which it considered to be a method used by the rich and powerful to divide and rule people of different nationalities and ethnicities. Avtonom was made the official organ of the new organisation and it set up the website avtonom.org, where internet users could self-publish their own articles; Russian courts later deemed the publication to be "extremist" and banned it from distribution.

In the first years of its existence, the AD established "anti-fascist patrol groups" to provide a physical resistance to Russian nationalists, forming the foundation of the Russian anti-fascist movement. Antifa in Russia has thus taken on a largely anarchist character. During the 2000s, activists from the AD organised regular veches (popular assemblies), which they used to organise actions and resolve internal conflicts. In 2005, sustained political repression against the organisation forced the editorial team of Avtonom to move its headquarters from Krasnodar to Moscow. By the 2010s, several activists were reporting that they suspected they were under state surveillance. In 2012, the Russian state annulled the residence permit of Avtonom editor Antti Rautiainen and deported him to Finland, causing the AD to lose one of its leading organisers. In March 2013, the national anarchist organisation Volnitsa disbanded itself and some of its left-wing members, led by Kirill Banshantsev, joined AD.

In 2013, the AD experienced a split; a number of revolutionary activists broke away from AD and formed People's Self-Defense (NS). While NS focused exclusively on class conflict, AD insisted that left-wing activists also ought to combat homophobia, racism and sexism. The split substantially weakened the AD, while the left-libertarian movement as a whole experienced significant repression from the Putin administration following the outbreak of the Russo-Ukrainian War. By 2019, AD had redefined itself as a "libertarian media group" which had grown out of the autonomous movement. Avtonom largely became focused on the international anarchist movement, having grown pessimistic about the state of left-wing politics in Russia. When the AD held lectures in the late 2010s, they did so under the protection of human rights organisations in order to keep their participants safe.

== See also ==
- Anastasia Baburova
- New Revolutionary Alternative

== Bibliography ==
- Filimonov, Kirill (2021). The Performance of Participation in Russian Alternative Media: Discourse, Materiality and Affect in Grassroots Media Production in Contemporary Russia (PDF). Uppsala Studies in Media and Communication. Vol. 15. Uppsala University. ISBN 978-91-513-1091-6. ISSN 1651-4777. Archived (PDF) from the original on 19 June 2024.
- Filimonov, Kirill; Carpentier, Nico (2021). "Beyond the state as the 'cold monster': the importance of Russian alternative media in reconfiguring the hegemonic state discourse". Critical Discourse Studies. 20 (2): 166–182. doi:10.1080/17405904.2021.1999283. Archived from the original on 10 October 2022.
- Kuznetsova, Alexandra; Sergeev, Sergey (2018). "Revolutionary Nationalism in Contemporary Russia". In Kolsto, Pal; Blakkisrud, Helge (eds.). Russia Before and After Crimea: Nationalism and Identity, 2010-17. Edinburgh University Press. pp. 119–141. ISBN 9781474433877. Archived from the original on 10 August 2024.
- Morozov, I. L. (2019). "Left-Wing Extremism in Modern Russia: Definition, Classification, Trends". Political Science Issues. doi:10.35775/PSI.2019.31.1.003. ISSN 2225-8922. Archived from the original on 31 July 2024.
- Sergeev, Sergey; Kuznetsova, Alexandra (2020). "Russian Left-Wing Radicals Are Losing: Why There Will Be Neither SYRIZA, Nor Podemos in Russia". International Journal of Management. 11 (10): 1785–1796. ISSN 0976-6502.
