= Azat Miftakhov =

Russian mathematician (1993-)

- Born: March 22, 1993 (age 33); Nizhnekamsk, Tatarstan, Russia
- Occupation: Mathematician
- Known for: political activism

Azat Fanisovich Miftakhov (Tatar: Азат Фәнис улы Мифтахов, romanized: Azat Fänis ulı Miftaxov, Russian: Азат Фанисович Мифтахов; born March 22, 1993) is a Tatar-Russian mathematician, convicted for acts of hooliganism against the United Russia ruling party.

== Early life and education ==
Miftakhov was born on 22 March 1993 in Nizhnekamsk, in the Republic of Tatarstan, Russia. He showed an interest in mathematics from an early age, while still in primary school. In 2010, he participated in the All-Russian Mathematical Olympiad for school children.

== Mathematical work ==
Miftakhov, in 2009, enrolled in the Faculty of Mechanics and Mathematics of Moscow State University and graduated from it in 2015. From 2015 he was a postgraduate student at the Department of Theory of Functions and Functional Analysis of Mechanics, working for his PhD with Dr Vladimir Igorevich Bogachev, MSU professor, as his supervisor.

== Activism, arrests, and trial ==
Miftakhov, a "self-described anarchist," was arrested on 1 February 2019, after law enforcement officers searched his student's dorm room, and accused of building an "explosive device" that had been found a year earlier in a city near Moscow, Balashikha. He subsequently claimed that, during interrogation, he was tortured by the police. The prosecution authorities twice ruled that there wasn't enough evidence to charge Miftakhov so he was released from detention on 7 February.

The same day, he was arrested again and charged with attacking the ruling political party's office in Moscow. On the night of 31 January 2018, unidentified persons had broken a window at United Russia's office on Onezhskaya Street, Moscow, and threw inside a smoke grenade. There were four people initially named as suspects in the case: anarchist activists Elena Gorban and Alexey Kobaidze, who both pleaded guilty and were released on their own recognizance; anti-fascist activist Andrey Eykin; and anarchist Svyatoslav Rechkalov. The investigation was suspended in September 2018 and resumed in February 2019, after the arrest of Miftakhov, with the accusations now being reclassified as about hooliganism, which is punishable by up to seven years in prison. Miftakhov was arrested after a "secret witness" under the pseudonym "Petrov" came forward and claimed he saw the graduate student near the United Russia office.

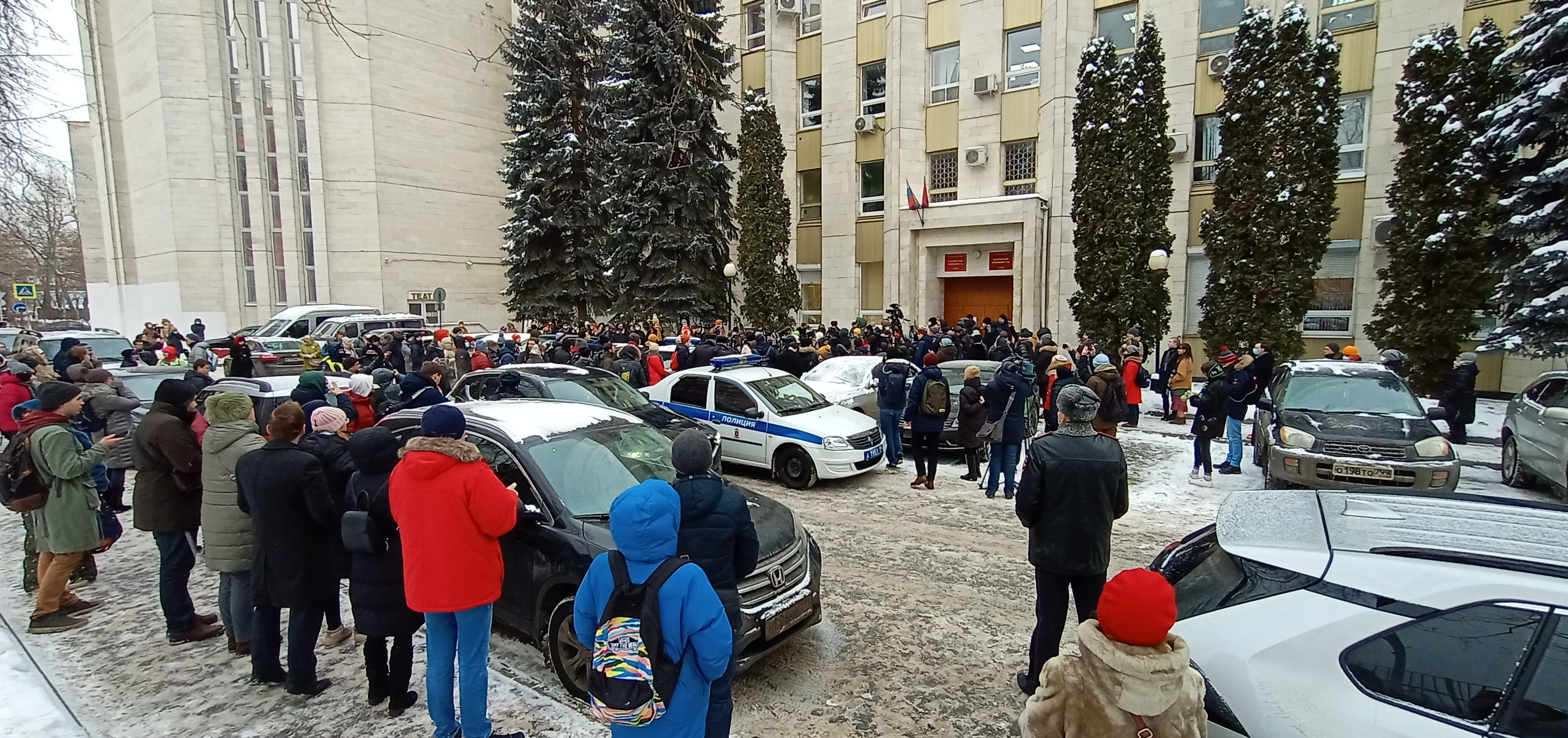
Hundreds gathered to support Azat Miftakhov anticipating Moscow's Golovinsky Court verdict in January 2021

In February 2020, the prosecutor's office issued an indictment against Elena Gorban, Andrey Eykin, and Azat Miftakhov. According to the indictment, they belonged to an anarchist movement called "People's Self-Defense", (Note: Not related to the Ukrainian Civil Movement "People's Self-Defense") which was, at the time, blamed for the 2018 terrorist attack on the Federal Security Service building in Arkhangelsk. Miftakhov denied any affiliation with the "People’s Self Defense" and pleaded not guilty of involvement in the attack on the United Russia office.

The trial began in Moscow's Golovinsky District Court in October 2020. On the 13th, the presiding judge accepted as authentic a document that stated secret witness "Petrov" had died in January 2020. The prosecution called on another secret witness, carrying the pseudonym "Karaulny", (Note: Russian for "guard", "sentry", "watchman") who testified, via video link, that Azat Miftakhov was not only a member of the People's Self-Defense but an active participant in the movement's activities, involved "in anarchist training activities," such as "combat training, knife fighting, and training" where participants "practiced techniques [to use] against police officers."

On 18 January 2021, the court found Miftakhov guilty of hooliganism and sentenced him to six years in a penal colony, as the prosecution had proposed, while handing the two other defendants, Elana Gorban to four years of probation and Andrey Eykin to two years of probation, with four years and three years of suspended sentences.

== Protests ==
Following the court's decision, but also during the trial, numerous protests were addressed to the Russian authorities for Miftakhov's treatment, such as the open letter issued on by the Société mathématique de France, another from the Brazilian Mathematical Society, and others. An open letter signed by many Russian scientists circulated in Russia and found its way in western academia. Approximately one hundred mathematicians from many countries signed a petition to boycott the 2022 International Congress of Mathematicians, then programmed to be held in Saint Petersburg, for various reasons, among which is the "sharp rising" in Russia of "the number of human rights defenders, journalists and scientists in Russian prisons and penal colonies", including specifically Miftakhov. Over a hundred Russian mathematicians, working both in Russia and abroad, called on the International Mathematical Union to postpone the 2022 International Congress of Mathematicians until the end of Miftakhov's imprisonment.

== Honors ==
The Fondation Mathématique Jacques Hadamard (FMJH) and the Laboratoire de Mathématiques d’Orsay (LMO) announced on February 23, 2021, that Azat Miftakhov is a Laureate of their incoming international mobility program called "junior scientific visibility" which aims to fund a period of research studies of a young talented international PhD students under the direction of a mathematician belonging to a FMJH-affiliated laboratory.

Azat Miftakhov was then named an honorary student of Paris-Saclay University on 4 March 2021.

An Azat Miftakhov Day was organized on 16 June 2021, by the Azat Miftakhov committee and sponsored by the French Mathematical Society (Société mathématique de France, SMF).

== See also ==
- Opposition to Vladimir Putin in Russia
- Anarchism in Russia
- Kansk affair
