= Aida Basevich =

Russian anarchist (1905–1995)

- Аида Басевич
- Born: 18 July 1905; Saint Petersburg, Russian Empire
- Died: 25 May 1995 (aged 89); Saint Petersburg, Russian Federation
- Movement: Anarchism
- Criminal charges: Anti-Soviet agitation
- Criminal penalty: Imprisonment, exile

Aida Issakhorovna Basevich (Russian: Аида Иссахаровна Басевич; 1905–1995) was a Russian anarchist. She was arrested on multiple occasions on account of her anarchist beliefs and endured stretches of imprisonment, political exile, and prison camp. She is notable for her efforts to acquire better treatment for political detainees and her prison memoir, which details her life and experiences in the anarchist movement.

== Biography ==
=== Early life ===
Basevich was born into a wealthy family in St. Petersburg, where her father was a successful construction engineer. She noted that he had a “revolutionary spirit” and owned publications written by the likes of Peter Kropotkin, Vera Figner, and Sergey Stepnyak-Kravchinsky, which she credits for her “entire moral upbringing”.

Basevich attended the Vyborg Commercial School in her youth. The school was known for its contemporary education practices education, including coeducation, parent-teacher committees and high political engagement in the classroom. However, her schooling there was cut short when she was 14 years old, as she contracted tuberculosis. In 1919, Basevich and her mother left Petrograd, although they kept in touch with and sent food parcels to her school. In 1921, she returned to Petrograd and attended night school but did not find it very stimulating. In this time in her life she began thinking about politics, and contemplated becoming a Komsomol member, an idea she abandoned after witnessing a violent Communist demonstration at a church.

Basevich enrolled in the State Institute of Art History in 1924. There, she first got involved in the anarchist movement, which she discussed regularly with an informal group of peers. Some of her friends in this group were arrested on campus for being anarchists after being elected to an internal school committee dedicated to helping students find work. Basevich lead the efforts to collect parcels and deliver them to her imprisoned friends.

=== Arrests, prison, and exiles ===
Basevich was first arrested on 8 February 1925. She was accused of being an anarchist and against Soviet regime. She wrote that "From my very first day in prison, my main task was to fight for a special regime for political prisoners". Her first effort was a hunger strike to gain visitation rights, joined by several other prisoners. She attempted to secure cell visits, better food, and exercise. After her first arrest she spent three years in exile in Orsk and Orenburg.

In 1928, seven months pregnant, she almost died, were it not for the interference of prominent dissident intellectuals and the Anarchist Black Cross. She received three years of exile in Minusinsk for involvement in a plot to help prisoners escape. Her final arrest was in 1941 where she was sentenced to 10 years in military camps. Her two daughters were sent to an orphanage. She gave birth to a son, Mikhail, in 1944 while in prison camp. In 1947, she was released from the camp and exiled to the Kuybyshev Region.

Throughout her arrests and exiles, Basevich encountered revolutionaries who intensified her anarchist leanings. While imprisoned, she wrote a memoir detailing her early life and stories from her time in exile and imprisonment. It includes descriptions of her resistance efforts and systemic violence in prison, as well as stories from her youth. Basevich's final bout of exile ended in 1957.

=== Later life ===
She spent the rest of her life in Leningrad, working as a technician until 1979 and reaching her death in 1995. She never strayed from her anarchist leanings and became a member of the post-Soviet Confederation of Anarcho-Syndicalists (KAS).

== See also ==
- Anarchism in Russia

== Works cited ==
- Basevich, Aida (2001). "How I Became an Anarchist". In Shapovalov, Veronica (ed.). Remembering the Darkness: Women in Soviet Prisons. Lanham: Rowman and Littlefield. pp. 125–146. ISBN 978-0-7425-1146-0. LCCN 2001020453.
- Hutton, Marcelline (2015). "Aida Basevich". Resilient Russian Women in the 1920s & 1930s. Lincoln, Nebraska: Zea Books. pp. 67–70. ISBN 978-1-60962-069-1.
