= Omori bank robbery =

1932 bank robbery in Tokyo, Japan

The Omori bank robbery (大森銀行ギャング事件) was a bank robbery committed by members of the Japanese Communist Party in Ōmori-ku, Tokyo, Japan, in 1932. The bank robbery was dubbed the Omori Gang affair or the Red Gang Affair.

== Background ==
On 6 October 1932, three party members stole 31,700 yen from the Kawasaki Daihyaku Bank Ōmori Branch in an attempt to obtain funds for party operations. The plan was unknown to all but one member of the central committee. The robbery badly discredited the party in the eyes of the public. The government took full advantage of the incident and subsequent trial to portray the party as a nest of gangsters, leading to the destruction of the Party.

== Perpetrators ==
Yusho Otsuka, who was the brother-in-law of Hajime Kawakami, hatched a plan to procure desperately needed funds for the party. He and an accomplice held up the main branch of the Kawasaki Daihyaku Bank in Ōmori. He used Kawakami's younger daughter, Yoshiko, to "drive alongside him in the getaway car to lend an air of respectability to their group escape." Yoshiko and Otsuka were able to outwit the police. Biographer Yasutaka Saegusa believes that the writer Osamu Dazai was indirectly involved in the Omori Gang bank robbery. Others who were accused of being connected to the robbery included those arrested in the Atami raid of 1933.

== Arrests ==
The robbery put a high price on Otsuka's head. Otsuka decided to discontinue his visits to Kawakami. In October 1932 police arrested party members involved in the armed robbery.
