= Kaizōsha =

Japanese publishing company

- Kaizōsha company logo
- Founded: 1919
- Founder: Yamamoto Sanehiko
- Country of origin: Japan
- Headquarters location: Tokyo
- Publication types: Books, magazines

Kaizōsha (改造社) was a major Japanese publishing company in the first half of the 20th century. Its achievements included publishing Kaizō, a popular general interest magazine which carried both works of fiction and articles pertaining to social issues and socialist thought. The company also was a major publishing outlet for literature.

== History ==
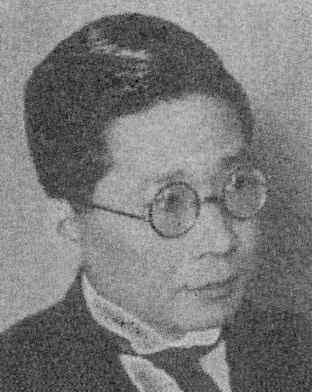
Yamamoto Sanehiko

Kaizōsha was founded in 1919 by the Japanese journalist Yamamoto Sanehiko (1885-1952), who became its president. He began by launching the general interest magazine, Kaizō (改造; English, "Reconstruction"), which during the 1920s would become a forum for Marxist and socialist debate. Contributors included Sakai Toshihiko, Yamakawa Hitoshi, Osugi Sakae, Kawakami Hajime and Kagawa Toyohiko. The magazine also published articles by foreign intellectuals such as Bertrand Russell and Albert Einstein, with the result that it became a voice in Japan of "new trends in thought and science".

Yamamoto also invited Russell, Einstein and other prominent foreign personalities, including Margaret Sanger (March 1922) and George Bernard Shaw (February 1933), to visit Japan.

=== Bertrand Russell ===
When Bertrand Russell was a guest professor at Peking University for ten months in 1920-21, the Kaizō magazine invited him to visit Japan. He accepted and upon his arrival on 17 July 1921 was welcomed by Yamamoto. He visited Kobe, Osaka, Nara, Kyoto and Tokyo and then sailed from Yokohama. During his tour he met many of the country's intellectuals and gave one lecture. Before and after his visit Russell contributed fifteen essays to Kaizō, which were published in English-Japanese bilingual editions and all "discussed social and political problems, except one on the Theory of Relativity".

=== Albert Einstein ===
In the following year Yamamoto arranged a six-week tour of Japan for Albert Einstein and his wife Elsa. Einstein arrived in the country just after he had been informed by telegram in Shanghai that he had won the Nobel Prize. While in Japan Einstein had meetings with many of Japan's intellectuals, gave a series of fifteen lectures, and was presented to Japan's Emperor and Empress. Yamamoto, who had been the first person to publish Einstein’s works in Japanese, now published a transcript of one of the latter's Japan lectures in Kaizō, which was notable in part for being Einstein's first work published after becoming a Nobel laureate.

=== Book series publications ===
Book series published by the firm included Gendai Nihon Bungaku Zenshū (現代日本文学全集) (English, "Complete Works of Contemporary Japanese Literature") (1926) and Kaizō Bunko (改造文庫; English, "Kaizō Paperback Library") (1929-1944). Each volume in both series was priced at one yen or less, a price which could be afforded by ordinary wage earners (previously books had been regularly priced at three yen each). The Kaizō Bunko series was designed to compete on price with the more expensive Iwanami Bunko series. By issuing inexpensive and revolutionary "enpon" (books costing just one yen each), Kaizōsha ignited a "revolutionary change" in the Showa publishing world.

Kaizōsha attempted to interpret Chinese culture for Japanese citizens by publishing translations of "contemporary Chinese writers, including Lu Xun" and by bringing "Chinese and Japanese writers together for both formal and informal exchange". In its early years the firm had published Marxist and socialist works, including multi-volume Japanese translations of Marx's Das Kapital, and over the decades it continued publish works by progressive authors, such as the feminist writer, Fumiko Hayashi.

=== Bungei (magazine) ===
In 1933 Kaizōsha launched Bungei (文藝) (English, "The Literary Arts"), a popular monthly literary magazine.

=== Decline ===
World War II saw increases in political repression, with events such as the Yokohama incident, in which three dozen intellectuals (including editors of Kaizō) were arrested. In July 1944 Kaizōsha, despite having tried from the late 1930s to accommodate some of the demands of the government, was disbanded due to military pressure, when it and another publisher, Chuokoron-Shinsha, whose output included the famous literary magazine, Chūō Kōron, were instructed by the Japanese Government's Home Ministry to close their businesses and both companies were dissolved at the end of the month.

After the war Kaizōsha re-opened and new issues of Kaizō magazine appeared, but the Kaizō Bunko book series remained closed. The firm's founder and president Yamamoto Sanehiko was elected as politician but died in 1952. Partly due to management problems and labour disputes, the firm's publishing operation closed permanently in 1955. Since the 2010s, there has been a chain of Kaizō-sha bookshops in Japan that is not associated with any publishing activities.
