= Kansk affair =

Ongoing criminal case in the Russian city of Kansk

The Kansk affair (Russian: Канское дело) or the affair of Kansk teens (Russian: дело канских подростков) is an ongoing criminal case in the Russian city of Kansk where in June 2020 the FSB agents arrested three 14-year-old boys while they were putting up political leaflets, whom the authorities accused of being an anarchist terror cell. One of the pieces of evidence in the case is the boys' actions in the video game Minecraft, where they constructed a virtual FSB building that they were blowing up in the game. A Russian human rights organization, Memorial, characterized the case against the three Kansk teens as political persecution.

== Background ==
In early June 2020, in the Russian Siberian city of Kansk, three 14-year-old boys were putting up political protest posters calling for the freedom of a jailed Moscow State University mathematics PhD student and anarchist political activist Azat Miftakhov. They had placed some of the posters on the outer wall of the local Federal Security Service building. The FSB tracked down the boys and detained them on June 6, 2020.

== Criminal prosecution ==
When the boys were initially detained on June 6, the FSB agents confiscated their phones, briefly questioned them and let them go. After searching the boys' phones more carefully and discovering a great deal of "unflattering" to FSB material there, the FSB summoned the boys the following day and interrogated them at length.

Two of the boys, Denis Mikhailenko and Bogdan Andreyev, admitted their guilt and were released under house arrest. The third boy, Nikita Uvarov, refused to admit guilt, and was jailed pending further investigation.

The Investigative Committee of Russia opened a criminal case against all three boys who were charged with training for terrorist activity with the goal of changing "the existing state and political structure in the Russian Federation". In November 2020, the criminal charges were upgraded to organizing a terror group.

The prosecutors discovered that the boys had engaged in backyard chemical experiments, with their parents' knowledge, including making a saltpeter smoke device and an improvised Molotov cocktail. They also discussed anarchism and anti-government activism on social media sites Vkontakte and Telegram, including discussing the writings of Peter Kropotkin, the songs of Kurt Cobain and Yegor Letov and of the yellow vests movement in France. The boys and their families dispute the authenticity of some of the group chat messages whose screenshots, displayed on the boys' confiscated phones, the FSB sources provided to the media.

A prominent piece of government evidence in the case is the boys' video game Minecraft, where they created a virtual FSB building which they were blowing up in the game.

In November 2020, Denis Mikhailenko was transferred from the home arrest to pretrial detention in prison after the authorities accused him of violating the prohibition on using the internet.

Nikita Uvarov remained imprisoned in pretrial detention since his initial arrest in June 2020. In February 2021, a court in Kansk extended his pretrial prison detention to at least April 8, 2021. In justifying its decision, the court cited testimony from the headmaster of Nikita's school who stated that Nikita "perceives the school as a hostile environment." The detention terms for Denis Mikhailenko and Bogdan Andreyev (home confinement for Andreyev and pretrial imprisonment for Mikhailenko) were similarly extended.

The boys are facing up to 10 years in prison on the current charges.

On March 9, 2021, Novaya Gazeta reported that the Investigative Committee of Russia dropped the more serious criminal charge against the three boys, added in November 2020, of organizing a terror group, because of the absence of the necessary elements of the crime. However, the original charge against the boys, filed in June 2020, of training for a terrorist activity, remains in force. The following day, March 10, 2021, the media reported that the prosecution added new criminal charges against the boys: four counts of manufacturing and three counts of storing explosive materials.

Two of the boys, who provided confessions during their initial June 2020 arrest, refused to answer the investigators' further questions in March 2021.

On May 4, 2021, Nikita Uvarov was released from prison, after a Krasnoyarsk Krai court found his continued pretrial confinement illegal. The criminal charges against him remain pending.

On August 4, 2021, a court trial of the three Kansk teens started in Kansk. They are being tried not in a civilian court but by the 1-st Eastern Military District Court.

On February 10, 2022, Nikita Uvarov, 16, was sentenced to five years in a penal colony by a military court in Siberia on charges of "terrorist training." Due to their cooperation with investigators, two other defendants were cleared of criminal charges and given suspended sentences.

In January 2023 the Supreme Court of Russia upheld the five-year sentence against Nikita Uvarov.

== Reactions ==
Several Russian news outlets criticized the prosecution of the boys as cruel and excessive. A news and media site, Baza.io, ran an in-depth inverstigative story about the case "Kansk lions. How 14-year-old Siberian schoolchildren pasted leaflets on an FSB building and became terrorists." The newspaper Novaya Gazeta ran a series of stories criticizing the government's handling of the situation about the Kansk schoolchildren case and likened the case to the treatment of children during Stalin's Great Purge in 1930s. A report by the Novaya Gazeta pointed out that the evidence leaked by the authorities to the pro-government media as seized in the Kansk case actually came from a different case, made public several months earlier.

The news site Grani.ru characterized the FSB case against the three Kansk boys as "fabricated". The original confessions of Mikhailenko and Andreyev were described in a report by a Russian RFE/RL affiliate as extracted "under pressure and threats".

In March 2021, a leading Russian human rights organization, Memorial, classified the case against the three Kansk teens as political persecution. In August 2023, Memorial recognized Nikita Uvarov as a political prisoner.

== See also ==
- Azat Miftakhov
- Tyumen case of anti-fascists
