= Anatoly Lamanov =

Leader of the Kronstadt rebellion

Anatoly Nikolaevich Lamanov (Russian: Анатолий Никола́евич Ламанов; died 1921) was one of the central figures of the 1921 Kronstadt rebellion in the RSFSR.

As student in 1917 he became Chairman of the Kronstadt Soviet of Worker's Deputies (the Kronstadt Soviet).

Little is known of his early life. As a third-year student in 1917, he had a significant part in the Kronstadt Uprising of 1921 and later served as the Chairman of the Kronstadt Soviet of Workers' and Soldiers' Deputies (the "Kronstadt Soviet"), as well as on the editorial board of its newspaper, Izvestiya (News).

Originally not from Kronstadt, Anatoly Lamanov was a third year technology student at the Institute of Technology who frequently lectured workers and soldiers on topics such as geography or natural history. He was the younger brother of the officer Piotr Lamanov, revolutionary commander of Kronstadt Naval Forces. Lamanov served as chairman of the Kornstadt soviet and was chief editor of its leading newspaper Izvestiia. He also led the Non-Party faction, a worker conscious movement that was wary of the representative model. The Non Party faction was later renamed as the Union of Socialist Revolutionaries Maximalists. In 1921, he was denounced as the leading ideologist of the Kronstadt uprising, and was eventually executed as a ‘counter revolutionary’. Lamanov had a central role in shaping the egalitarian radical socialist ideology of Kronstadt.

== Relation to the April Crisis ==
As leader of the Non Party group, Lamanov consolidated the ideas of the many different portions of the Kronstadt Soviet. One Menshevik observer is noted to say that his ideology was neither “Leninist nor Anarchist’. He called for restraint, close ties with the Petrograd Soviet and an avoidance of ‘disunity and party discord’ which had ‘ruined the revolution of france’. He also held up the mantra of “If only so far” in his idea of the relationship between Kronstadt and the Provisional Government. Like many Kronstadters, Lamanov felt that the relationship with the provisional Government shouldn’t be immediately severed if they fail to uphold the revolutionary spirit of the February revolutions, but that they must be pressured into aligning themselves with the Kronstadt soviet . Up until the April Crisis, Lamanov had avoided discussing the question of power in relation to Russia at large. With the Foreign Minister reaffirming Russia’s commitment to continuing their involvement in World War I -- which was a major trigger for the February revolutions—Kronstaders feeling betrayed, turned away from their creative endeavours to focusing on how they would maintain their radical democracy in relation to the decisions made by the provisional government.

== Importance of his position on the newspaper ==
Lamanov, as chairman of the Executive Committee of the Kronstadt Soviet, was the subject of hostility from the Bolsheviks after denouncing Raskolnikov and the July Days. However, the Bolsheviks were not able to blunt Lamanov’s political influence, for Lamanov was elected as chairman of the newspaper Izvetsiia’s editorial commission. In the Aftermath of the July Days, opposition to the Bolsheviks resulted in swelling support for the Non-Partyists, or, as it would come to be called, the Union of Socialist Revolutionaries-Maximalists. As chairman of Izvetsiia, Lamanov “was in a favourable position to give ample newspaper coverage to their views, even though they had to be passed by three major Soviet factions represented on the editorial board.”

On 21 April, Lamanov denounced the declarations of the provisional government and turned the debate away from the power question, to affirming a solidarity with the struggles of the Petrograd Soviet. He also urged the soviet to avoid moving the power to the revolutionary government, instead he argued that “full support” should be given to the petrograd soviet. In addition, he helped set a motion that would have the soviet ‘fully support revolutionary pressure on the provisional government and its continuous and relentless control over it in the interests of the revolution’ . This motion was unique to Kronstadt in its contrast with the bolshevik resolution that called for the complete overthrow of the provisional government. Lamanov’s approach to the April Crisis was instrumental in maintaining an antagonistic relationship with the Provisional Government without calling for its complete overthrow. This stance also sent shockwaves into the Petrograd Soviet, as it showed that the bolsheviks didn’t have the influence in Kronstadt that they purported to have when sending their delegates to Petrograd. The Bolsheviks were later going to gain support, as they opposed Lamanov’s insistence on joining into a coalition government with the bourgeoisie. This would culminate in the July days. He was also head of Kronstadt's 'Non-Party Group', which in August 1917 merged with the Union of Socialist-Revolutionaries Maximalists. Lamanov subsequently joined the Communist party but resigned during the 1921 uprising. He was the editor of the anti-Bolshevik rebels' Izvestia (News) newsletter of the Provisional Revolutionary Committee. Shortly after the uprising, Lamanov was executed as a counter-revolutionary by the Bolsheviks.

== Sources ==
- Getzler, Israel (1983). Kronstadt: 1917 - 1921; the Fate of a Soviet Democracy. Cambridge: Cambridge University Print.
