= People's Self-Defense (Russia) =

People's Self-Defense Народная самооборона
- Leader: Collective leadership
- Founder: Svyatoslav Rechkalov
- Founded: August 11, 2013; 13 years ago
- Banned: September 15, 2022; 3 years ago
- Split from: Autonomous Action
- Headquarters: Moscow, Russia
- Newspaper: Pryamoe deystvie (Direct action)
- Ideology: Anarchism; Anarcho-communism; Direct democracy Left-wing radicalism
- Political position: Far-left
- Colours: Red; Black
- Slogan: "Scientific progress, direct democracy and anarchism" (Russian: "Научный прогресс, прямая демократия и анархизм")

Party flag

Website
- naroborona.info

The People's Self-Defense (Russian: Народная самооборона; Narodnaya samooborona) is a Russian anarchist organisation.

== History ==
The organization emerged in 2013 as a result of the split of Autonomous Action, the largest Russian anarchist organization at the time. At the beginning it was called Autonomous Action (Social Revolutionary) (AD-SR; Russian: Автономное действие (социал-революционное); АД-СР; Avtonomnoye deystviye (sotsial-revolyutsionnoye), AD-SR), and in 2015 it was renamed "People's Self-Defense". One of its leaders was Svyatoslav Rechkalov.

The organization positions itself as a "non-partisan socio-political organization" and an anarchist media platform that publishes articles on anarchism and news about actions. It was also involved in protecting evicted residents in Moscow and in the fight against employers who do not pay salaries to workers.

A report received by RIA Novosti from law enforcement agencies says that from December 2017 to December 2018, supporters of People's Self-Defense carried out 247 "actions of an extremist nature" in 40 cities of Russia, including one terrorist act in Arkhangelsk, one fact of public justifications for terrorist activities and five cases of hooliganism and vandalism.

On March 14, 2018, Svyatoslav Rechkalov was detained for two days. According to him, he was beaten, tortured with electric shocks, demanding to reveal the names of other anarchists and to confess his involvement in their actions. After his release, Rechkalov received political asylum in France.

In September 2022, the Chelyabinsk Regional Court recognized the People's Self-Defense as a terrorist organization.

== See also ==
- Anarchism in Russia
