= New Revolutionary Alternative =

Russian far-left terrorist organisation

The New Revolutionary Alternative (Russian: Новая Революционная Альтернатива; NRA) was a Russian far-left terrorist organisation, allegedly active during the late 1990s.

== History ==
During the late 1990s, several bombing attacks were carried out against the Federal Security Service (FSB) by far-left activists of the Russian Communist Workers Party (RCWP), who had become disillusioned with the post-Soviet government of Russia. In 1998, RCWP member Alexander Biryukov carried out a bombing attack against the FSB. In April 1999, four women affiliated with the RCWP carried out a bombing of the Lubyanka Building, the headquarters of the FSB in Moscow. The latter bombing was allegedly carried out in protest against the carpet bombing of Grozny during the Second Chechen War. Following these attacks, the FSB announced the existence of a new far-left terrorist organisation, the "New Revolutionary Alternative", which the FSB held responsible for the bombings. In 2001, it was reported that NRA had also set off bombs in Moscow military offices (Ostankino in 1996 and Cheryomushkinsky in 1997).

In 2003, Nadezhda Raks, Olga Nevskaya, Larisa Romanova, and Tatiana Nekhorosheva-Sokolova were found guilty of the bombings. Romanova's sentence was later commuted. Alexander Biryukov was declared incompetent to stand trial and was sent to a psychiatric hospital.

== Legacy ==
The New Revolutionary Alternative has since become associated with anarchism and has been listed alongside other anarchist terrorist groups of the late 20th century, such as the German 2 June Movement and the Italian Revolutionary Proletarian Initiative Nuclei. The Combat Organization of Anarcho-Communists (BOAK) has cited the NRA as an inspiration for its attacks against Russian rail infrastructure following the Russian invasion of Ukraine.

== See also ==
- Anarchism in Russia
- Black Guards
- Chernoe Znamia
- Narodnaya Volya

== Bibliography ==
- Aizman, Ania (2024). "From Representation to Sabotage: The New Practices of Russian Antiwar Groups". The Russian Review. 83 (83): 66–78. doi:10.1111/russ.12579.
- Hellmuth, Dorle (2018). "Of terrorism types and countermeasures: In need of a new framework". Comparative Strategy. 37 (3): 155–174. doi:10.1080/01495933.2018.1486081.
- Saradzhyan, Simon; Abdullaev, Nabi (2005). "Disrupting Escalation of Terror in Russia to Prevent Catastrophic Attacks". Connections. 4 (1): 111–130. doi:10.11610/Connections.04.1.08. JSTOR 26323159.
