= Arkhangelsk FSB office bombing =

2018 terrorist attack against the Russian security service

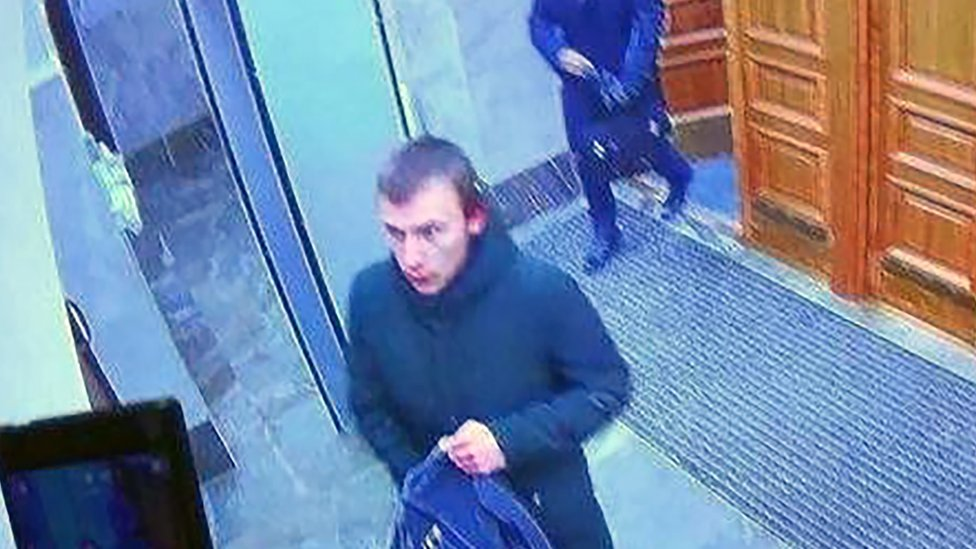
- The perpetrator entering the FSB precinct before the bombing
- Location: 64.5359°N 40.5201°E; Arkhangelsk, Arkhangelsk Oblast, Russia
- Date: 31 October 2018; 8:52 AM (Moscow Time)
- Target: Federal Security Service
- Attack type: Suicide bombing
- Weapon: Acetone peroxide powered improvised explosive device
- Deaths: 1 (the perpetrator)
- Injuries: 3
- Perpetrator: Mikhail Vasilievich Zhlobitsky
- Motive: Anarcho-communist terrorism

The Arkhangelsk FSB office suicide bombing occurred on the morning of 31 October 2018, then a Mikhail Vasilievich Zhlobitsky, a 17-year old tekhnikum student entered the Arkhangelsk office of the Russian Federal Security Service (FSB) and pulled a manually controlled improvised explosive device from under his clothes and detonated it. He died on the spot and the explosion injured three local FSB officers.

== Motive ==
Minutes before the explosion, a post was submitted to an anarcho-communist themed online chat on Telegram by a user under the alias "Sergey Nechayev" who used the logo of the Red Army Faction as his profile picture, stating he was going to bomb the Arkhangelsk FSB office in retaliation against the torture of Russian anarchists and anti-fascists, and also that he would "most likely die because of an explosion".

== See also ==
- Network (Russia)
- 2019 Moscow FSB headquarters shooting
