= What I Believe (Tolstoy book) =

1884 book by Leo Tolstoy

What I Believe (В чём моя́ ве́ра?), first published in English as My Religion, is an 1884 book by Leo Tolstoy. It was listed as Volume 4 of an untitled four-part work.
