= Social Democratic Party of Russia =

Social Democratic Party of Russia may refer to one of the following Russian political parties and movements.

- Russian Social Democratic Labour Party (1898-1912)
  - Russian Social Democratic Labour Party (Mensheviks) (1912-1965)
  - Russian Social Democratic Labour Party (bolsheviks) (1912-1918)
- Social Democratic Party of Russia (1990) (1990-2011)
- Russian Party of Social Democracy (1994-2002)
- Russian United Social Democratic Party (2000-2001)
- Russian United Democratic Party Yabloko (1993-)
- Social Democratic Party of Russia (2001) (2001-2007)
  - Union of Social Democrats (2007-с. 2013)
  - Russian Social-Democratic Union of Youth (2000-2017)
- Social Democratic Party of Russia (2012) (2012-2019)
