= Samara electoral district =

Pre-Soviet Electoral district

Samara
- Former Civilian constituency for the All-Russian Constituent Assembly
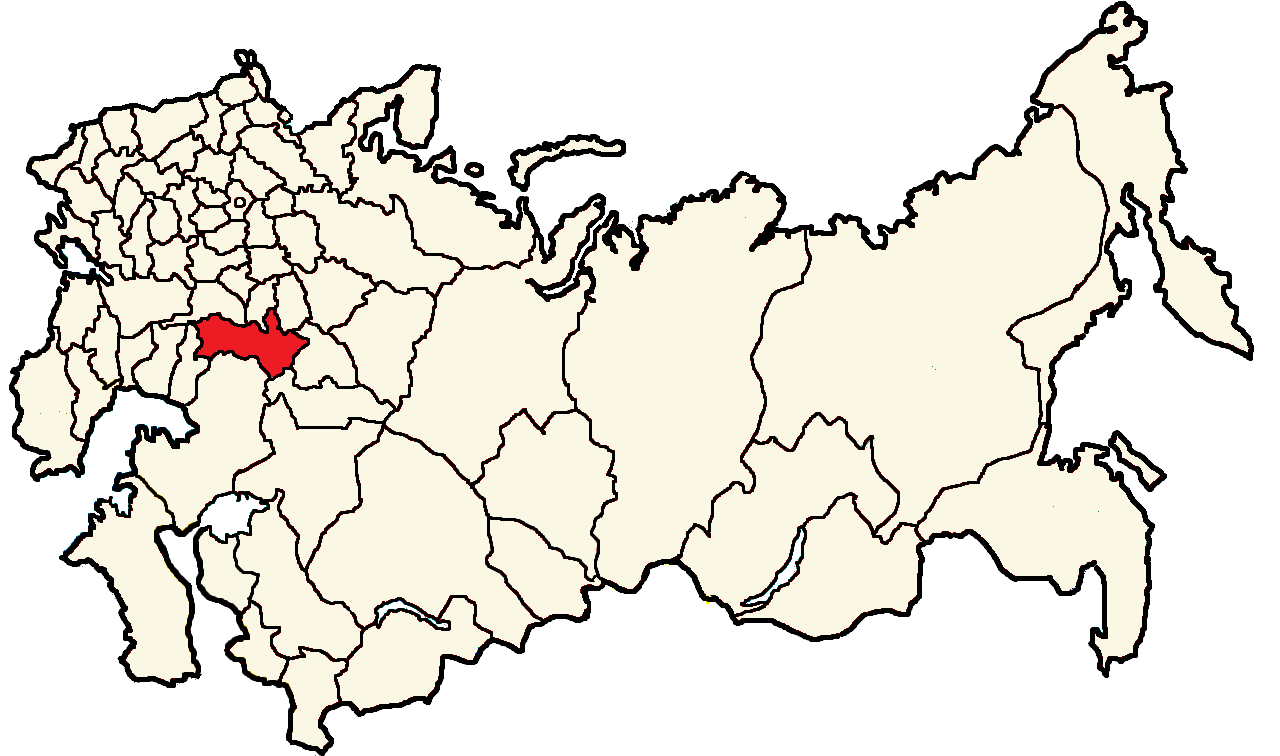

Former constituency
- Created: 1917
- Abolished: 1918
- Number of members: 17
- Number of Uyezd Electoral Commissions: 7
- Number of Urban Electoral Commissions: 1
- Number of Parishes: 318

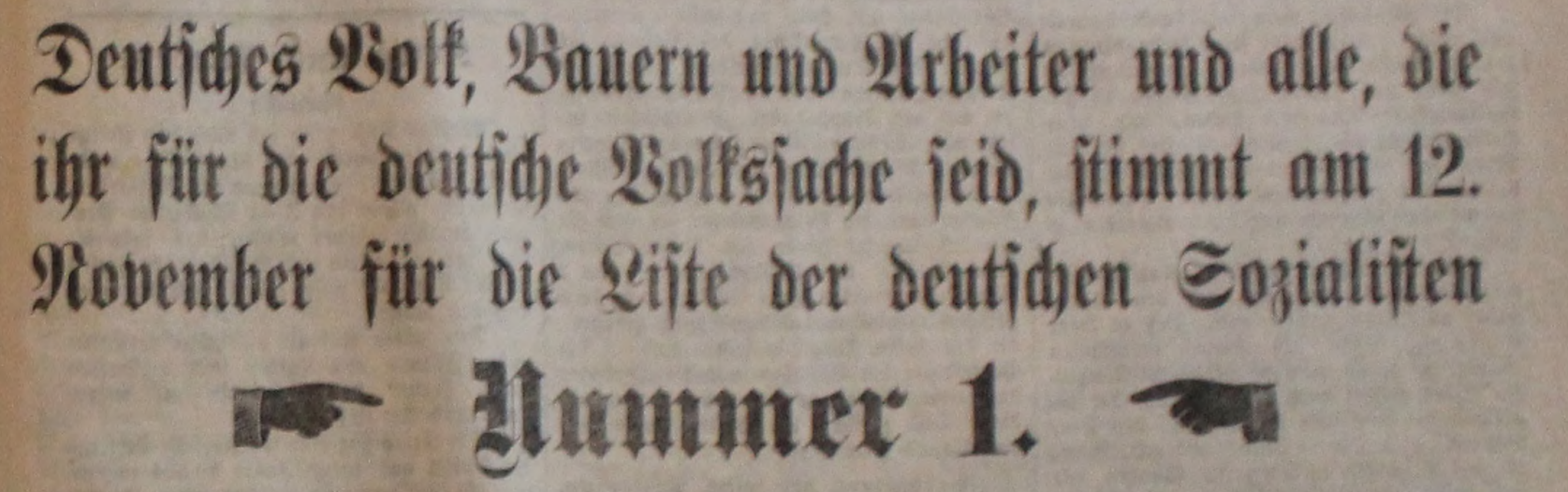
Advert for the German socialist list in the newspaper Der Kolonist

The Samara electoral district (Russian: Самарский избирательный округ) was a constituency created for the 1917 Russian Constituent Assembly election.

The electoral district covered the Samara Governorate. Electoral turnout reportedly stood at 54.86%. Out of 95 different candidate lists submitted, 79 turned down by the electoral authorities (out of which approx 42 due to late submission). The constituency had large German and Tatar minorities. The German socialist list (list no. 1) had four candidates, Walter Müller from Petrograd, Robert Haffner from Samara, Arthur Feidel from Katharinenstadt and Philipp Leisle from Warenburg.

In Samara city the Bolsheviks polled 42% of the vote, the SRs 27% and Kadets 14%. In Stepnoye Volost, consisting of seven German settlements, 2,213 votes (53.53%) were cast for the German non-socialist list against 1,894 votes (45.82%) for the German socialist list. The remaining votes were split between 6 votes for the SR list, 5 votes for the Bashkir Federalist list, 4 votes for the Bolsheviks, 4 votes for the Unity list, 3 votes for the Ukrainian list, 2 votes for the Popular Socialists, 2 votes for the Old Believer list and 1 single vote for the Menshevik list. There were 29 invalid votes. All in all, out of the 7,747 eligible voters 56.58% participated in the vote in the volost, with results raging from over 95% for the German socialists in Brabander and 92% for the German non-socialists in Lauwe.

== Results ==
Samara
Party	Vote	%	Seats
List 3 - Soviet of Peasants Deputies and Socialist-Revolutionaries	702,924	58.47	12
List 2 - Bolsheviks	179,533	14.93	3
List 13 - Muslim Shuro-Islamia	126,558	10.53	2
List 16 - Union of Russian Citizens of German Nationality in the Central Volga Region	47,705	3.97	
List 6 - Kadets	44,466	3.70	
List 1 - Union of Socialists of the Volga German Region	42,148	3.51	
List 15 - Orthodox Followers	13,133	1.09	
List 4 - Bashkir Federalists	12,397	1.03	
List 8 - Chuvash National Congress of Socialist-Revolutionaries	9,036	0.75	
List 7 - Old Believer Joint Committee	6,508	0.54	
List 10 - Ukrainians	4,378	0.36	
List 5 - Popular Socialists	4,364	0.36	
List 6 - Mensheviks	4,166	0.35	
List 12 - Non-Party Peasants-Farmers	3,030	0.25	
List 11 - Unity	937	0.08	
List 14 - Menshevik-Internationalists	936	0.08	
Total:	1,202,219		17

Deputies Elected
Mukhamediyarov	Muslim Shuro
Tuktarov	Muslim Shuro
Ermoshchenko	Bolshevik
Kuybyshev	Bolshevik
Maslennikov	Bolshevik
Arkangelsky	SR
Bashkirov	SR
Belozerov	SR
Brushvit	SR
Chupakhin	SR
Dedusenko	SR
Elyashevich	SR
Fortunatov	SR
Klimushkin	SR
Lazarev	SR
Maslov	SR
Bogoslovov	SR
