= Independent Democratic Party of Russia =

Political party in Russia (2008–2014)

Independent Democratic Party of Russia Независимая демократическая партия России
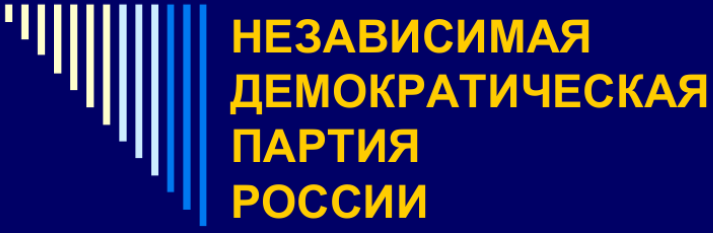
- Abbreviation: NDPR (English); НДПР (Russian)
- Leader: Mikhail Gorbachev; Alexander Lebedev
- Founded: September 29, 2008; 17 years ago
- Dissolved: 2011
- Split from: A Just Russia
- Preceded by: Union of Social Democrats
- Headquarters: Moscow, Russia
- Ideology: Liberalism; Social liberalism
- Political position: Centre to centre-left
- Colours: Dark blue Light blue

Website
- www.ndpr.alebedev.ru

The Independent Democratic Party of Russia (НДПР, IDPR or NDPR; Russian: Независимая демократическая партия России, romanized: Nezavisimaya demokraticheskaya partiya Rossii) was a proposed Russian political party announced in late September 2008 by the former General Secretary of the Soviet Union, Mikhail Gorbachev, and former State Duma deputy of A Just Russia, Alexander Lebedev. The proposed party was intended to be based on Gorbachev's Union of Social Democrats.

Lebedev stated that the "party will press for legal and economic reform and promote the growth of independent media" as well as "less state capitalism", a reform of the justice system, and a stronger role of the parliament. The organisers initially intended for the party to participate in future elections, and plans for its registration and a founding congress were still being discussed in 2009. The project did not develop into an active political party as planned, and was described as defunct by 2011 by The Moscow Times.
