= Russian Social Democratic Union of Youth =

Russian Social-Democratic Union of Youth Российский социал-демократический союз молодёжи
- Abbreviation: RSDUY (English); РСДСМ (Russian)
- Leader: Natalya Platova (2001-2006); Evgeny Konovalov (2006-2016); Alexander Belyaev (2016-2022)
- Founded: Current: 2021; Historical: 10 December 2000
- Dissolved: 2025
- Preceded by: Social Democratic Union of Youth of St. Petersburg
- Headquarters: Saint Petersburg, Russia
- Ideology: Social democracy Democratic socialism
- Political position: Centre-left
- National affiliation: Russian United Social Democratic Party (2000–2001), Social Democratic Party of Russia (2001–2007), Union of Social Democrats (2007–2009)
- European affiliation: Ecosy
- International affiliation: International Union of Socialist Youth
- Colours: Red
- Anthem: The Internationale

Website
- rsdsm.ru

Russian Social-Democratic Union of Youth (RSDUY; Russian: Российский социал-демократический союз молодёжи, РСДСМ - Rossiyskiy Sotsial-Demokraticheskiy Soyuz Molodiozhi, RSDSM) is a Russian non-governmental organization founded in December 2000 with the support of Mikhail Gorbachev as a youth branch of the Russian United Social Democratic Party. It became a member of the International Union of Socialist Youth in 2004. The chairman has been Evgeniy Konovalov since 2006.

In 2007, members participated in the establishment of the Union of Social Democrats.

On 19 March 2007, RSDUY refused to sign the Declaration of the Progressive Youth Forum, appealing to the fact that its authors actually call for revolution and trying to flirt with the nationalists.

On 25 November 2007, Evgeniy Konovalov has been detained by the riot police on the Palace Square in St.Petersburg. He and others arrested with him were released 45 minutes later.

On 9 August 2008, RSDUY and "Jusos-Rheinland-Pfalz" issued a joint resolution condemning the 2008 South Ossetia War.

In October 2008, RSDUY together with Young socialists of Georgia declared their commitment to nonviolent methods of conflict resolution. On 6 December 2009 the process of cooperation between Young Socialist of Georgia and Russian Social Democratic Union of Youth fully supported during the conference of Young political leaders from Black Sea area.

On 24 June 2009, chairman of RSDUY Evgeniy Konovalov was dismissed from a Russian state company "Russian Post" for his political and public activity.

On Sunday, 25 July 2010, in St. Petersburg the group hosted the third congress of Russian Social-Democratic Union of Youth.

The group intends on becoming a mass political party in Russia.

In March 2011, St. Petersburg authorities shut down antifascist film festival "Open Your Eyes!" (organized by RSDUY).

In 2009, the legal entity was liquidated. The organization operates without state registration.
