= Mikhail Gorbachev =

Leader of the Soviet Union from 1985 to 1991

- Михаил Горбачёв
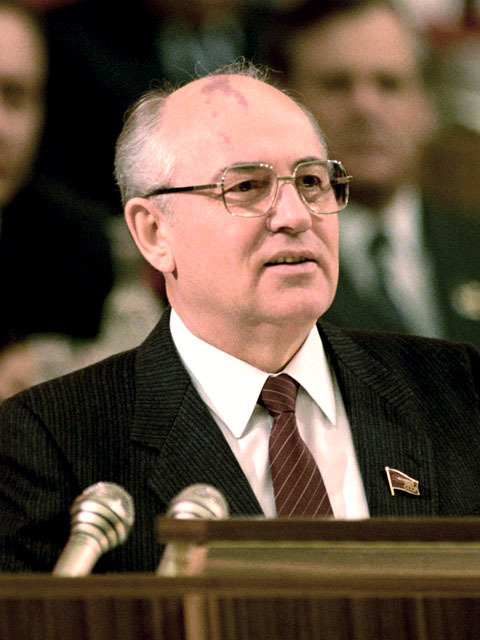
- Gorbachev in 1987

President of the Soviet Union
- In office 15 March 1990 – 25 December 1991 (Note: Briefly suspended from 19 to 21 August 1991 during the August Coup, when coup leaders proclaimed Vice President Yanayev as the Acting President.)
- Prime Minister: Nikolai Ryzhkov (as Premier); Valentin Pavlov; Ivan Silayev (de facto)
- Vice President: Gennady Yanayev (Note: De facto until 21 August 1991; de jure until 4 September.)
- Preceded by: Himself as Chairman of the Supreme Soviet
- Succeeded by: Office abolished (Note: This post was abolished on 25 December 1991 and powers were transferred to Boris Yeltsin, the President of Russia. Functions of the presidency were succeeded by the Council of Heads of State and the Executive Secretary of the Commonwealth of Independent States.)

General Secretary of the Communist Party of the Soviet Union
- In office 11 March 1985 – 24 August 1991 (Note: On 14 March 1990, the provision on the CPSU monopoly on power was removed from Article 6 of the Constitution of the USSR. Thus, in the Soviet Union, a multi-party system was officially allowed, and the CPSU ceased to be part of the state apparatus.)
- Deputy: Vladimir Ivashko
- Preceded by: Konstantin Chernenko
- Succeeded by: Vladimir Ivashko (acting)

Chairman of the Supreme Soviet of the Soviet Union
- In office 25 May 1989 – 15 March 1990
- Premier: Nikolai Ryzhkov
- Deputy: Anatoly Lukyanov
- Preceded by: Himself as Chairman of the Presidium of the Supreme Soviet
- Succeeded by: Anatoly Lukyanov (Note: Himself (as head of state as President).)

Chairman of the Presidium of the Supreme Soviet of the Soviet Union
- In office 1 October 1988 – 25 May 1989
- Premier: Nikolai Ryzhkov
- Preceded by: Andrei Gromyko
- Succeeded by: Himself as Chairman of the Supreme Soviet
Additional positions
Co-Chairman of the Union of Social Democrats
In office 11 March 2000 (Note: Himself as the Chairman of the United Social Democratic Party of Russia until 24 November 2001, and the Chairman of the Social Democratic Party of Russia until 20 October 2007) – 15 November 2017
Preceded by	Party established
Succeeded by	Party disestablished
Second Secretary of the Communist Party of the Soviet Union
In office 9 February 1984 – 10 March 1985
Preceded by	Konstantin Chernenko
Succeeded by	Yegor Ligachyov

Personal details
- Born: Mikhail Sergeyevich Gorbachev; 2 March 1931 Privolnoye, North Caucasus Krai, Russian SFSR, Soviet Union
- Died: 30 August 2022 (aged 91) Moscow, Russia
- Resting place: Novodevichy Cemetery, Moscow, Russia
- Party: CPSU (1952–1991); Independent (1991–2000; from 2013); ROSDP (2000–2001); SDPR (2001–2007); USD (2007–2013)
- Spouse: Raisa Titarenko (m. 1953; died 1999)
- Children: 1
- Education: Moscow State University
- Website: Official website
- Gorbachev's voice Recorded 2012
- Central institution membership: 1980–1991: Member, 25th, 26th, 27th, 28th Politburo; 1979–1980: Candidate, 25th Politburo; 1978–1991: Member, 25th, 26th, 27th, 28th Secretariat; 1971–1991: Member, 24th, 25th, 26th, 27th, 28th Central Committee; Other offices held: 2001–2004: Chairman, Social Democratic Party of Russia; 1985–1991: Chairman, Defense Council; 1970–1978: First Secretary, Stavropol Regional Committee
- Leader of the Soviet Union: ← Chernenko; None (last holder)

Mikhail Sergeyevich Gorbachev (Note: UK: /ˈɡɔːrbətʃɒf, ˌɡɔːrbəˈtʃɒf/, US: /-tʃɔːf, -tʃɛf/; Russian: Михаил Сергеевич Горбачёв, romanized: Mikhail Sergeyevich Gorbachyov, IPA: [mʲɪxɐˈil sʲɪrˈɡʲejɪvʲɪdʑ ɡərbɐˈtɕɵf]) (2 March 1931 – 30 August 2022) was a Soviet and Russian politician who was the last leader of the Soviet Union from 1985 until the country's dissolution in 1991. He served as General Secretary of the Communist Party from 1985, and additionally as head of state from 1988. (Note: At first, Gorbachev derived his actual power from his position as General Secretary. He also succeeded Andrei Gromyko as Chairman of the Presidium of the Supreme Soviet in 1988, representing a largely ceremonial "collective head of state". The new Congress of People's Deputies elected him the sole head of state with the title of Chairman of the Supreme Soviet the following year. After a constitutional amendment ended the Communist Party's monopoly on power in 1990, the office of president of the Soviet Union was created, most executive authority was transferred to it, and Gorbachev was elected unopposed as its first and only holder.) Ideologically, he initially adhered to Marxism–Leninism, but moved towards social democracy by the early 1990s.

Born in Privolnoye, North Caucasus Krai, into a peasant family of Russian and Ukrainian heritage, Gorbachev grew up under the rule of Joseph Stalin. In his youth, Gorbachev operated combine harvesters on a collective farm, before joining the Communist Party, which then governed the Soviet Union as a one-party state. Studying at Moscow State University, he married fellow student Raisa Titarenko in 1953 and received his law degree in 1955. Moving to Stavropol, he worked for the Komsomol youth organization and, after Stalin's death, became a keen proponent of the de-Stalinization reforms of Soviet leader Nikita Khrushchev. Gorbachev was appointed the first party secretary of the Stavropol Regional Committee in 1970, overseeing the construction of the Great Stavropol Canal. In 1978, Gorbachev returned to Moscow to become a secretary of the party's Central Committee. He joined the governing Politburo (25th term) as a non-voting member the following year and as a voting member in 1980.

Three years after the death of Soviet leader Leonid Brezhnev, and following the brief tenures of Yuri Andropov and Konstantin Chernenko, the Politburo elected Gorbachev as general secretary in 1985. Although committed to preserving the Soviet state and its Marxist–Leninist principles, Gorbachev believed significant reform was necessary for its survival. He withdrew troops from the Soviet–Afghan War, and embarked on summits with United States president Ronald Reagan to limit nuclear weapons and end the Cold War. Domestically, Gorbachev's policy of glasnost ("openness") and demokratizatsiya ("democratization") allowed for enhanced freedom of speech and the press, while his perestroika ("restructuring") sought to decentralize economic decision-making to improve its efficiency. Ultimately, his democratization measures and formation of the elected Congress of People's Deputies undermined the one-party state. When various Warsaw Pact countries abandoned Marxist–Leninist governance in 1989, he declined to intervene militarily. Growing nationalist sentiment within constituent republics threatened to break up the Soviet Union, leading hardliners within the party to launch an unsuccessful coup against him in August 1991. In the wake of the coup, the Soviet Union dissolved against Gorbachev's wishes.

After resigning from the presidency, he launched the Gorbachev Foundation, became a vocal critic of Russian presidents Boris Yeltsin and Vladimir Putin, and campaigned for Russia's social-democratic movement. Considered one of the most significant figures of the second half of the 20th century, Gorbachev remains controversial. The recipient of a wide range of awards, including the Nobel Peace Prize, he was praised for his role in ending the Cold War, introducing new political and economic freedoms in the Soviet Union, and tolerating both the fall of Marxist–Leninist administrations in eastern and central Europe and the German reunification. Critics see him as weakening Russia's global influence and precipitating an economic collapse in the country.

== Early life and education ==
=== 1931–1950: Childhood and adolescence ===
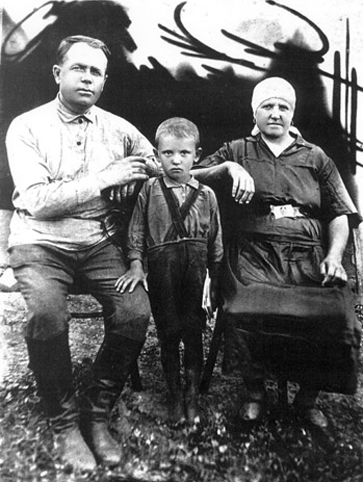
Gorbachev and his Ukrainian maternal grandparents, late 1930s

Mikhail Sergeyevich Gorbachev was born on 2 March 1931 in Privolnoye, then part of North Caucasus Krai, Russian SFSR, Soviet Union, and now part of Krasnogvardeysky District, Stavropol Krai. Privolnoye was divided between Russians and Ukrainians at the time. His paternal family were Russians and had moved from Voronezh several generations before, while his maternal family were Ukrainians and had migrated from Chernigov. Gorbachev's parents, Sergey Andreyevich Gorbachev and Maria Panteleyevna Gorbacheva (née Gopkalo), named him Viktor at birth. However, at Maria's insistence, Gorbachev had a secret baptism, where Sergey's father christened him Mikhail. Gorbachev's relationship with Sergey was close, while Maria was cold and punitive. The couple were poor and lived as peasants. They married as teenagers in 1928. In keeping with local tradition, Sergey and Maria initially resided in the house of the former's father, an adobe-walled hut, before a hut of their own could be built.

The Soviet Union was a one-party state governed by the Communist Party, led by Joseph Stalin. Stalin had initiated a project of mass rural collectivization meant to help convert the country into a socialist society. Maria's father joined the Communist Party in 1928 and helped form Privolnoye's first kolkhoz the following year, becoming its chair. It was 19 kilometers (12 miles) outside Privolnoye. At the age of three, Gorbachev left his parental home and moved into the kolkhoz with Maria's parents.

Two of Gorbachev's paternal uncles and an aunt died in the famine of 1930–1933. This was followed by the Great Purge, in which individuals accused of being "enemies of the people" were interned in labor camps or executed. Both of Gorbachev's grandfathers served time in labor camps. After his December 1938 release, Maria's father discussed having been tortured by the secret police, an account that influenced Gorbachev.

During the Second World War, the German Army started invading the Soviet Union in June 1941, and occupied Privolnoye for four and a half months the following year. Sergey fought on the frontlines; he was wrongly declared dead during the war and fought in the 1943 Battle of Kursk before returning to his family, injured. Following the war, Sergey and Maria had their second son, Aleksandr, in 1947; Gorbachev and Aleksandr were the couple's only children.

The school in Privolnoye was closed during much of the war, re-opening in autumn 1944. Gorbachev did not want to return but excelled academically when he did. He read voraciously, moving from the Western novels of Thomas Mayne Reid to the works of Vissarion Belinsky, Alexander Pushkin, Nikolai Gogol, and Mikhail Lermontov. In 1946, Gorbachev joined the Komsomol, the Soviet political youth organization, becoming leader of his local group, and was then elected to the Komsomol committee for the district. From primary school, he moved to the high school in Molotovskoye; he stayed there during the week and walked the 19 km (12 mi) home during weekends. As well as being a member of the school's drama society, Gorbachev organized sporting and social activities, and led the school's morning exercise class. Over the course of five consecutive summers starting with 1946, he returned home to assist Sergey in operating a combine harvester; they sometimes worked 20 hours a day during those summers. In 1948, they harvested over 800 metric tons (1,800,000 pounds) of grain, a feat for which Sergey was awarded the Order of Lenin; the following year, Gorbachev was awarded the Order of the Red Banner of Labour.

=== 1950–1955: University ===
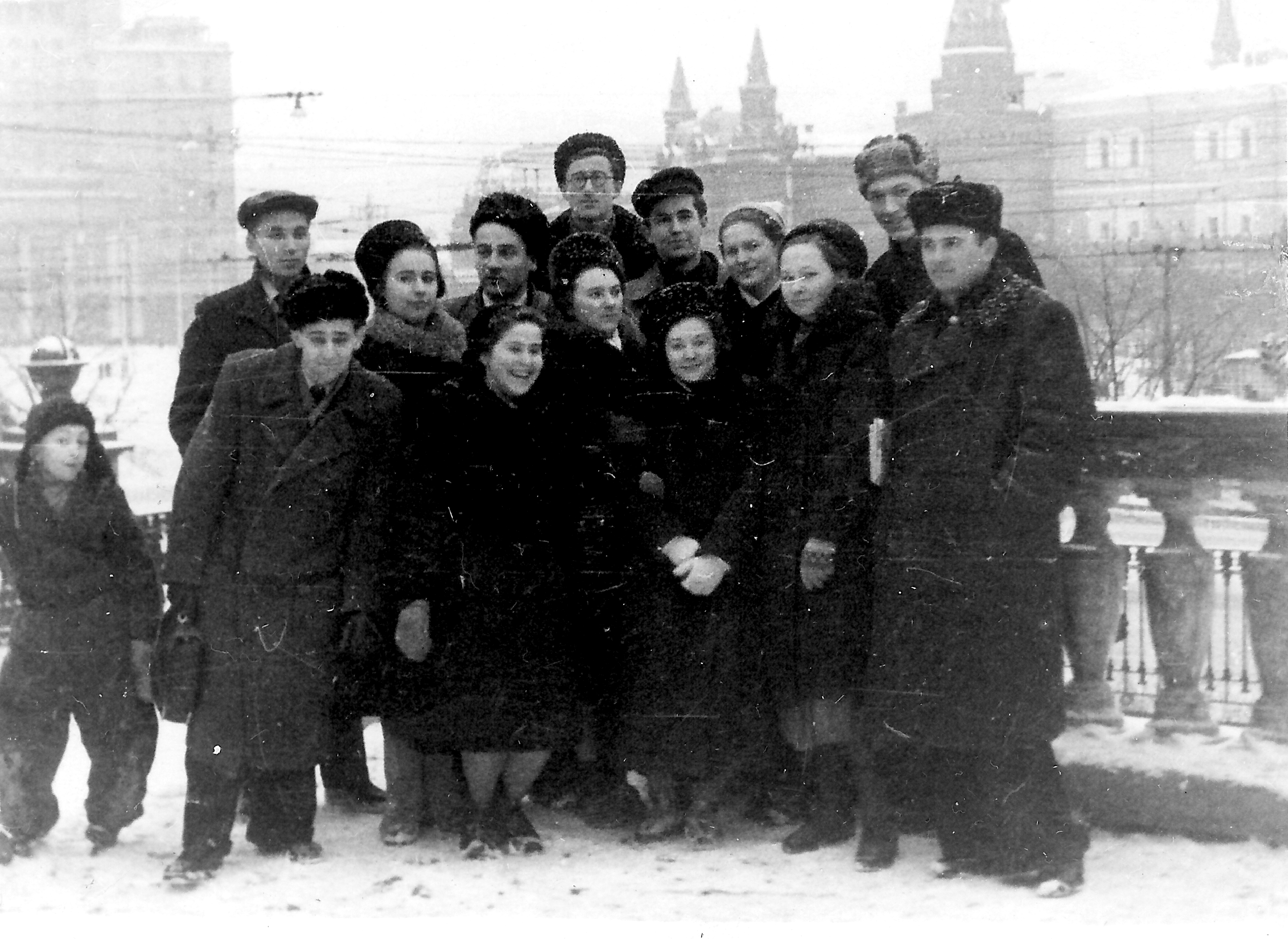
Gorbachev (first from right) with his classmates at the Faculty of Law of Moscow State University, 1952

I would consider it a high honour to be a member of the highly advanced, genuinely revolutionary Communist Party of Bolsheviks. I promise to be faithful to the great cause of Lenin and Stalin, to devote my entire life to the party's struggle for Communism.

— Gorbachev's letter requesting membership of the Communist Party, 1950

In June 1950, Gorbachev became a candidate member of the Communist Party. He applied to study at the law school of Moscow State University (MSU), then the most prestigious university in the country. They accepted him without asking for an exam, likely because of his worker-peasant origins and his possession of the Order of the Red Banner of Labour. His choice of law was unusual; it was not a well-regarded subject in Soviet society at that time. At age 19, he traveled by train to Moscow, the first time he had left his home region.

In Moscow, Gorbachev resided with fellow MSU students at a dormitory in the Sokolniki District. He felt at odds with his urban counterparts, but soon came to fit in. Fellow students recall his working especially hard, often late into the night. He gained a reputation as a mediator during disputes and was outspoken in class, but was private about his views; for instance, he confided in some students his opposition to the Soviet jurisprudential norm that a confession proved guilt, noting that confessions could have been forced. During his studies, an antisemitic campaign spread through the Soviet Union, culminating in the Doctors' plot; Gorbachev publicly defended Volodya Liberman, a Jewish student accused of disloyalty.

At MSU, Gorbachev became the Komsomol head of his entering class, and then Komsomol's deputy secretary for agitation and propaganda at the law school. One of his first Komsomol assignments in Moscow was to monitor the election polling in Presnensky District to ensure near-total turnout; Gorbachev found that most people voted "out of fear". In 1952, he was appointed a full member of the Communist Party. He was tasked with monitoring fellow students for subversion; some of his fellow students said he did so only minimally and that they trusted him to keep confidential information secret from the authorities. Gorbachev became close friends with Zdeněk Mlynář, a Czechoslovak student who later became a primary ideologist of the 1968 Prague Spring. Mlynář recalled that the duo remained committed Marxist–Leninists despite their growing concerns about the Stalinist system. After Stalin died in March 1953, Gorbachev and Mlynář joined the crowds massing to see Stalin's body lying in state.

At MSU, Gorbachev met Raisa Titarenko, who was studying in the university's philosophy department. She was engaged to another man, but after that engagement fell apart, she began a relationship with Gorbachev; together they went to bookstores, museums, and art exhibits. In early 1953, he took an internship at the procurator's office in Molotovskoye district, but he was angered by the incompetence and arrogance of those working there. That summer, he returned to Privolnoye to work with his father on the harvest; the money earned allowed him to pay for his wedding. On 25 September 1953, he and Raisa registered their marriage at Sokolniki Registry Office, and in October, moved in together at the Lenin Hills dormitory. Raisa discovered that she was pregnant and although the couple wanted to keep the child she fell ill and required an abortion.

In June 1955, Gorbachev graduated with a distinction; his final paper had been on the advantages of "socialist democracy" over "bourgeois democracy" (liberal democracy). He was subsequently assigned to the Soviet Procurator's office, which was focusing on the rehabilitation of the innocent victims of Stalin's purges, but found that they had no work for him. He was then offered a place on an MSU graduate course specializing in kolkhoz law, but declined. He had wanted to remain in Moscow, where Raisa was enrolled in a PhD program, but instead gained employment in Stavropol; Raisa abandoned her studies to join him there.

== Early CPSU career ==
=== 1955–1969: Stavropol Komsomol ===
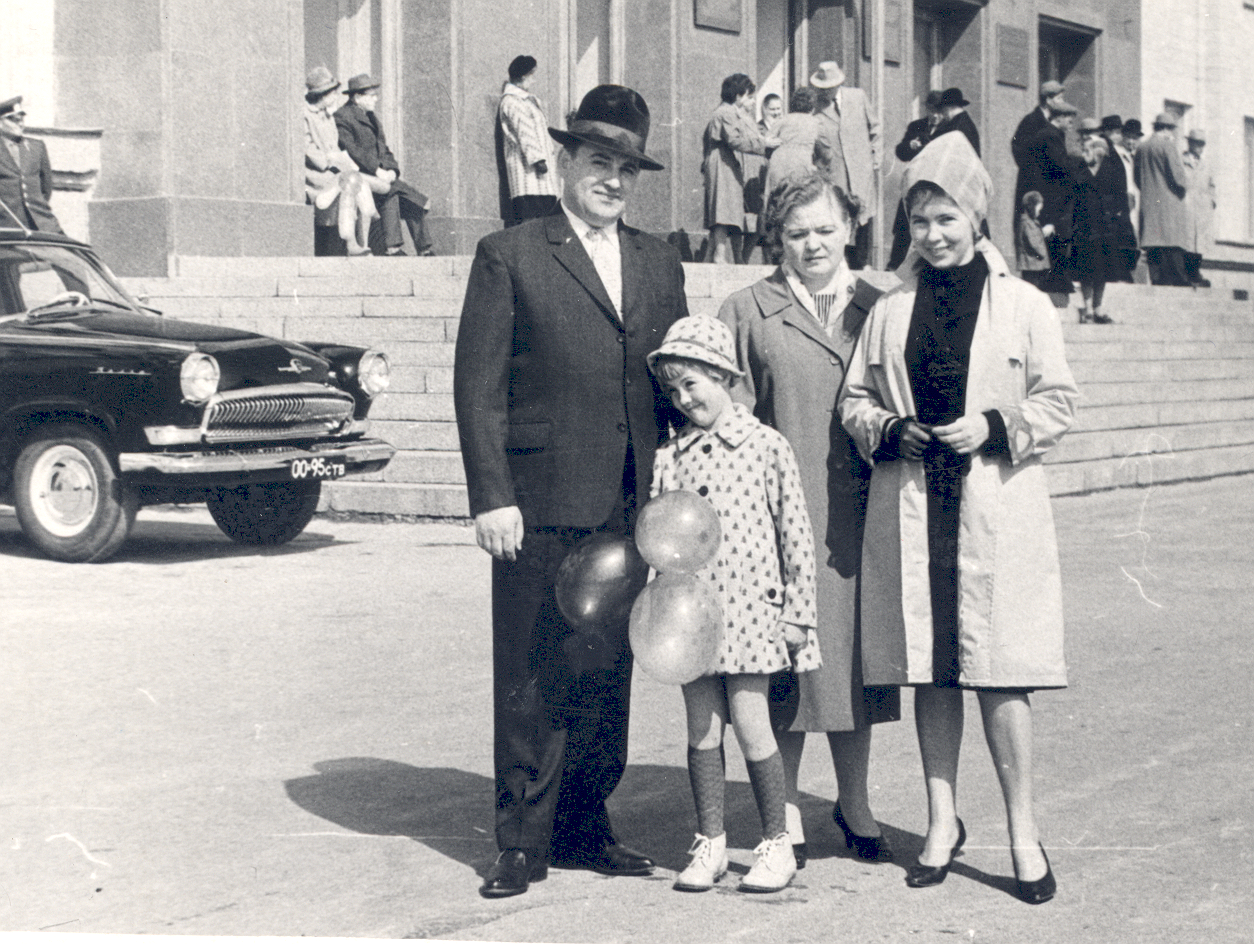
Gorbachev with his wife (far right) and daughter in Stavropol, 1964

In August 1955, Gorbachev started work at the Stavropol regional procurator's office, but disliked it and got a transfer to work for Komsomol, becoming deputy director of Komsomol's agitation and propaganda department for that region. In this position, he visited villages in the area and tried to improve the lives of their inhabitants; he established a discussion circle in Gorkaya Balka to help its peasant residents gain social contacts.

Gorbachev and his wife Raisa initially rented a small room in Stavropol, taking daily evening walks around the city and on weekends hiking in the countryside. In January 1957, Raisa gave birth to a daughter, Irina, and in 1958 they moved into two rooms in a communal apartment. In 1961, Gorbachev pursued a second degree, in agricultural production; he took a correspondence course from the local Stavropol Agricultural Institute, receiving his diploma in 1967. His wife had also pursued a second degree, attaining a PhD in sociology in 1967 from the Moscow State Pedagogical University; while in Stavropol she joined the Communist Party.

Stalin was succeeded as Soviet leader by Nikita Khrushchev, who denounced Stalin and his cult of personality in a speech given in February 1956, after which he launched a de-Stalinization process throughout Soviet society. Later biographer William Taubman suggested that Gorbachev "embodied" the "reformist spirit" of the Khrushchev era. Gorbachev was among those who saw themselves as "genuine Marxists" or "genuine Leninists". He helped spread Khrushchev's anti-Stalinist message in Stavropol, but encountered many who saw Stalin as a hero and praised his purges as just.

Gorbachev rose steadily through the ranks of the local administration. The authorities regarded him as politically reliable, and he would flatter his superiors, for instance gaining favor with prominent local politician Fyodor Kulakov. With an ability to outmaneuver rivals, some colleagues resented his success. In September 1956, he was promoted First Secretary of the Stavropol city's Komsomol, placing him in charge of it; in April 1958 he was made deputy head of the Komsomol for the entire region. He was given better accommodation: a two-room flat with its own private kitchen, toilet, and bathroom. In Stavropol, he formed a discussion club for youths, and helped mobilize local young people to take part in Khrushchev's agricultural and development campaigns.

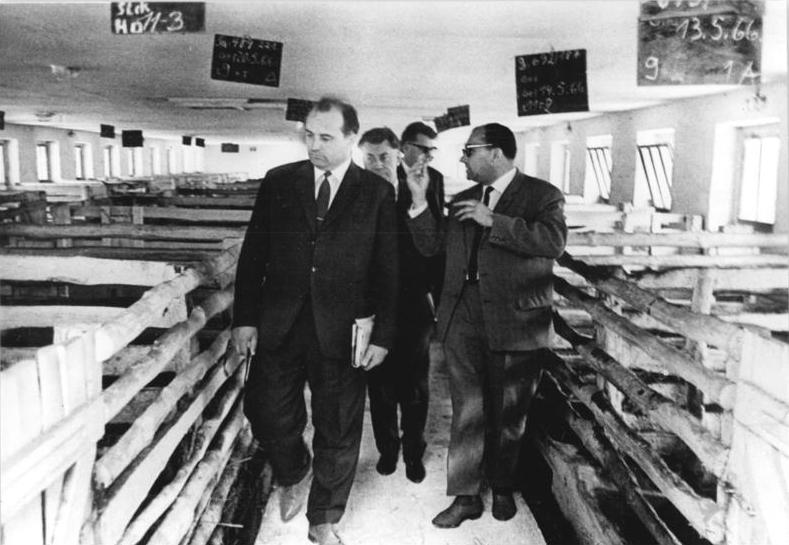
Gorbachev on a visit to East Germany in 1966

In March 1961, Gorbachev became First Secretary of the regional Komsomol, in which position he went out of his way to appoint women as city and district leaders. In 1961, Gorbachev played host to the Italian delegation for the World Youth Festival in Moscow; that October, he attended the 22nd Congress of the Communist Party of the Soviet Union. In January 1963, Gorbachev was promoted to personnel chief for the regional party's agricultural committee, and in September 1966 became First Secretary of the Stavropol City Party Organization ("Gorkom"). By 1968 he was frustrated with his job—in large part because Khrushchev's reforms were stalling or being reversed—and he contemplated leaving politics to work in academia. However, in August 1968, he was named Second Secretary of the Stavropol Kraikom, making him the deputy of First Secretary Leonid Yefremov and the second most senior figure in Stavropol Krai. In 1969, he was elected as a deputy to the Supreme Soviet of the Soviet Union and made a member of its Standing Commission for the Protection of the Environment.

Cleared for travel to Eastern Bloc countries, in 1966 he was part of a delegation which visited East Germany, and in 1969 and 1974 visited Bulgaria. In August 1968 the Soviet Union led an invasion of Czechoslovakia to put an end to the Prague Spring. Although Gorbachev later stated that he had had private concerns about the invasion, he publicly supported it. In September 1969 he was part of a Soviet delegation sent to Czechoslovakia, where he found the people largely unwelcoming. That year, the Soviet authorities ordered him to punish Fagim B. Sadygov, a philosophy professor of the Stavropol agricultural institute whose ideas were regarded as critical of Soviet agricultural policy; Gorbachev ensured that Sadykov was fired from teaching but ignored calls for him to face tougher punishment. Gorbachev later related that he was "deeply affected" by the incident; "my conscience tormented me" for overseeing Sadykov's persecution.

=== 1970–1977: heading the Stavropol region ===
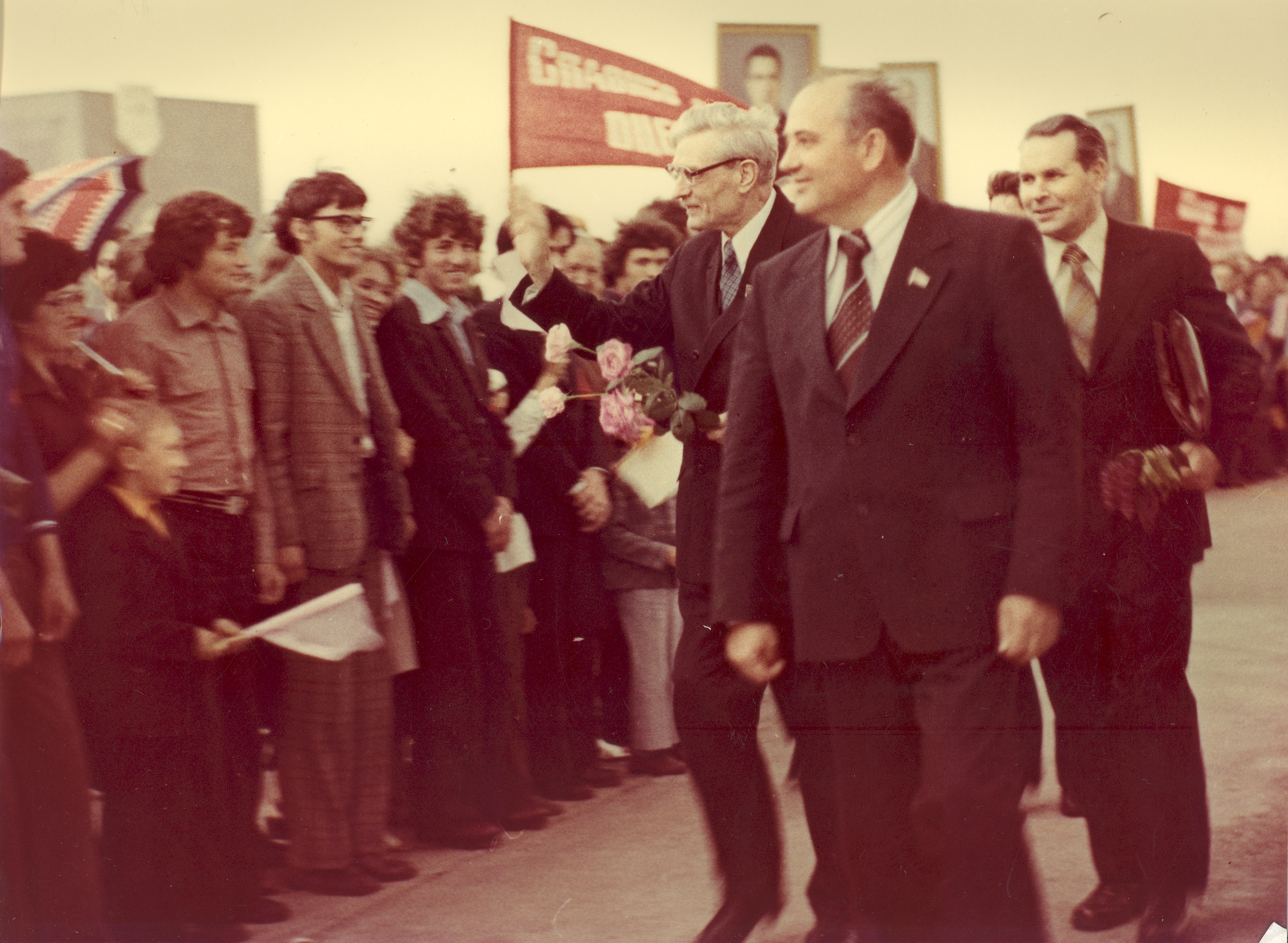
Gorbachev and Suslov at Stavropol's 200th anniversary celebrations, 1978

In April 1970, Yefremov was promoted to a higher position in Moscow and Gorbachev succeeded him as the First Secretary of the Stavropol kraikom. This granted Gorbachev significant power over the Stavropol region. He had been vetted for the position by senior Kremlin leaders and was informed of their decision by the Soviet leader, Leonid Brezhnev. Aged 39, he was considerably younger than his predecessors. As head of the Stavropol region, he automatically became a member of the Central Committee of the Communist Party of the Soviet Union (24th term) in 1971. According to biographer Zhores Medvedev, Gorbachev "had now joined the Party's super-elite". As regional leader, Gorbachev initially attributed economic and other failures to "the inefficiency and incompetence of cadres, flaws in management structure or gaps in legislation", but eventually concluded that they were caused by an excessive centralization of decision making in Moscow. He began reading translations of restricted texts by Western Marxist authors such as Antonio Gramsci, Louis Aragon, Roger Garaudy, and Giuseppe Boffa, and came under their influence.

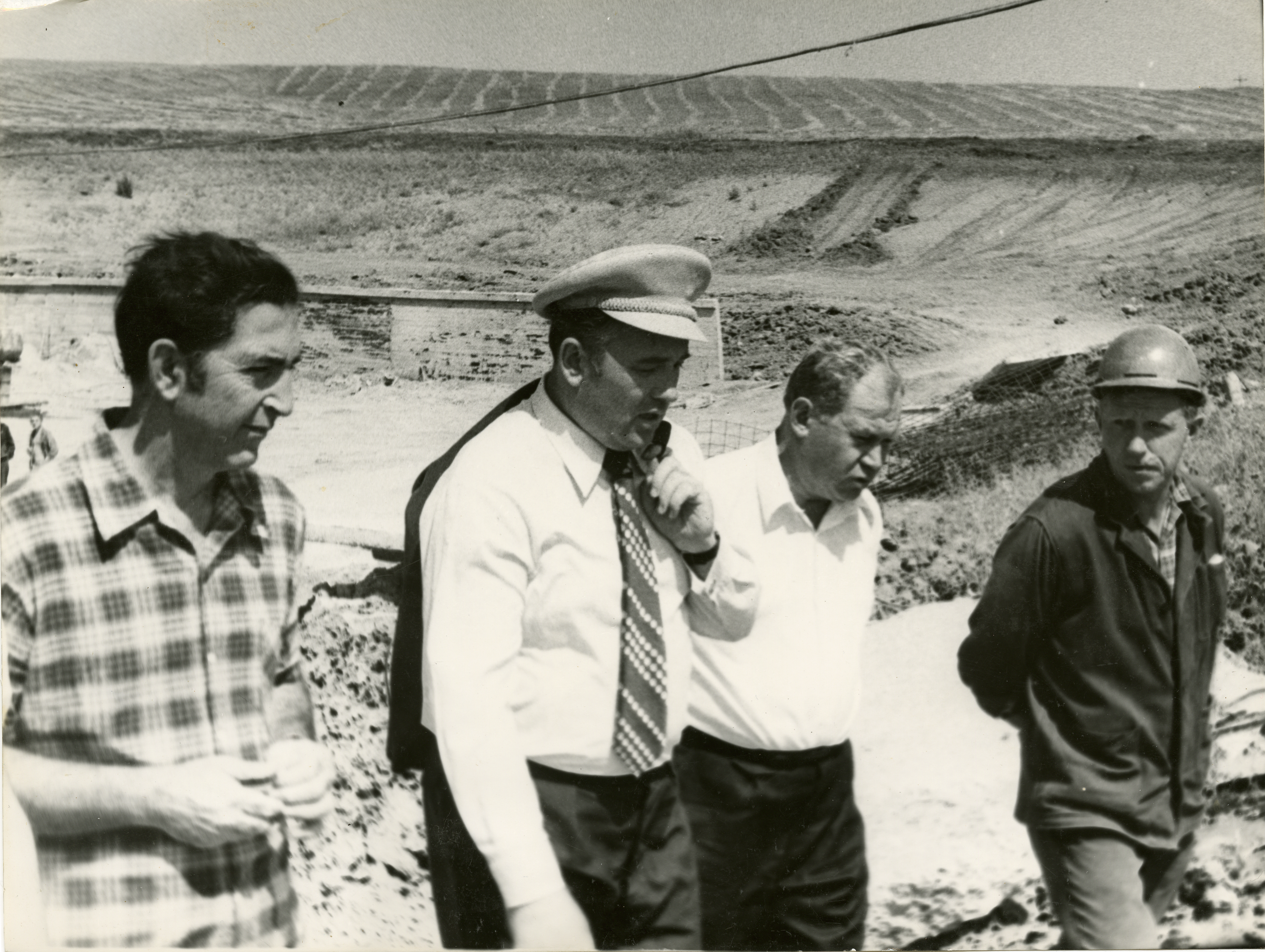
Gorbachev inspecting the construction of the Great Stavropol Canal

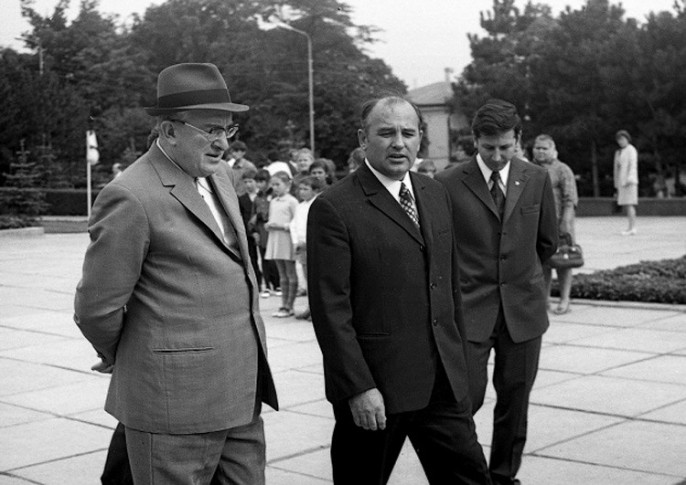
Gorbachev (right) with his mentor Yuri Andropov in 1973

Gorbachev's main task as regional leader was to raise agricultural production levels, a task hampered by severe droughts in 1975 and 1976. He oversaw the expansion of irrigation systems through construction of the Great Stavropol Canal. For overseeing a record grain harvest in Ipatovsky district, in March 1972 he was awarded the Order of the October Revolution by Brezhnev in a Moscow ceremony. Gorbachev sought to maintain Brezhnev's trust; as regional leader, he repeatedly praised Brezhnev in his speeches, for instance referring to him as "the outstanding statesman of our time". Gorbachev and his wife holidayed in Moscow, Leningrad, Uzbekistan, and resorts in the North Caucasus; he holidayed with the head of the KGB, Yuri Andropov, who was favorable towards him and who became an important patron. Gorbachev developed good relationships with senior figures including the Soviet prime minister, Alexei Kosygin, and the longstanding senior party member Mikhail Suslov.

The government considered Gorbachev sufficiently reliable to be sent in Soviet delegations to Western Europe; he made five trips there between 1970 and 1977. In September 1971 he was part of a delegation to Italy, where they met with representatives of the Italian Communist Party; Gorbachev loved Italian culture but was struck by the poverty and inequality he saw there. In 1972, he visited Belgium and the Netherlands, and in 1973 West Germany. Gorbachev and his wife visited France in 1976 and 1977, on the latter occasion touring the country with a guide from the French Communist Party. He was surprised by how openly West Europeans offered their opinions and criticized their political leaders, something absent from the Soviet Union, where most people did not feel safe speaking so openly. He later related that for him and his wife, these visits "shook our a prior belief in the superiority of socialist over bourgeois democracy".

Gorbachev had remained close to his parents; after his father became terminally ill in 1974, Gorbachev traveled to be with him in Privolnoe shortly before his death. His daughter, Irina, married fellow student Anatoly Virgansky in April 1978. In 1977, the Supreme Soviet appointed Gorbachev to chair the Standing Commission on Youth Affairs due to his experience with mobilizing young people in Komsomol.

== Secretary of the Central Committee of CPSU ==
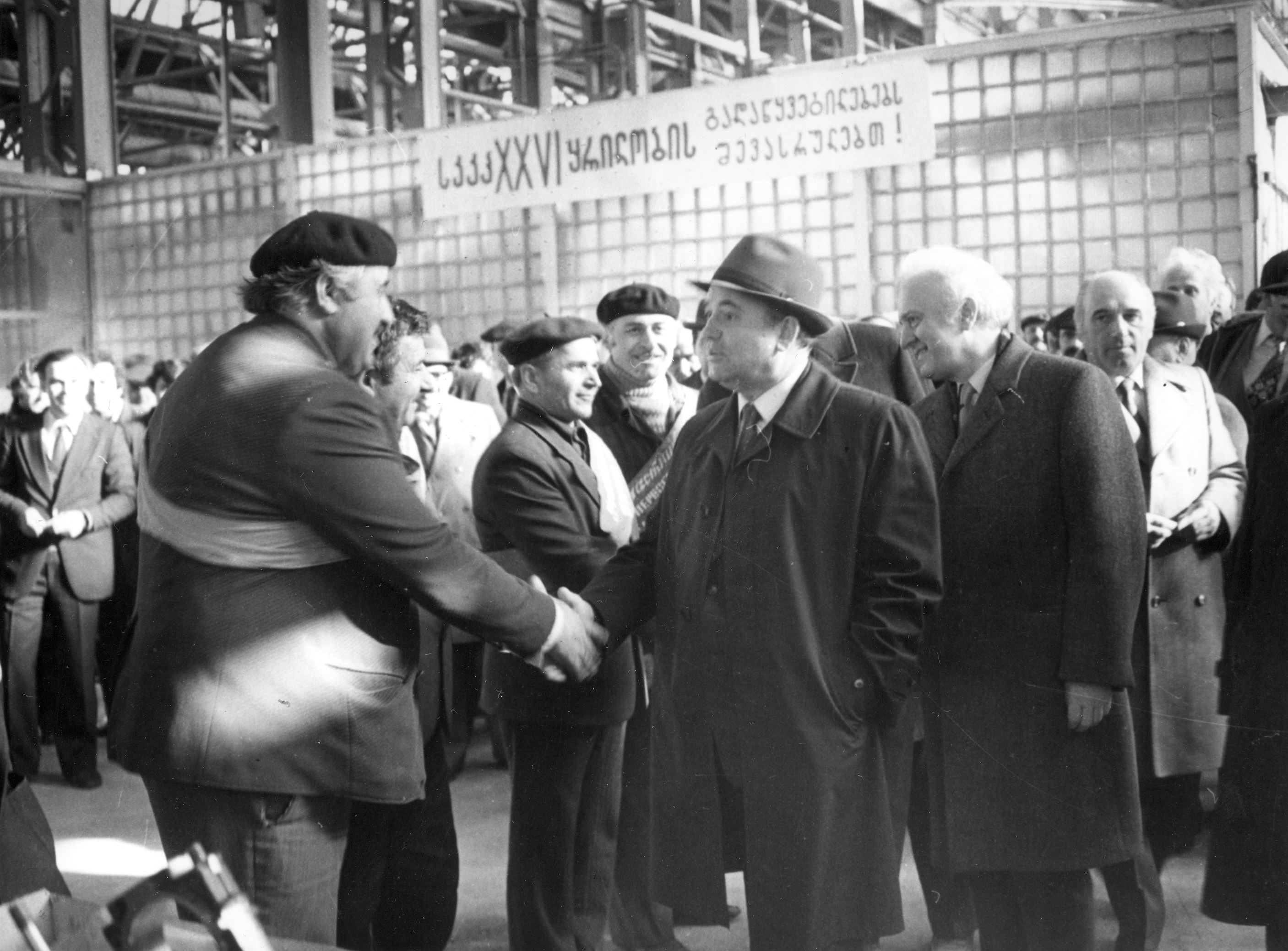
Gorbachev, accompanied by First Secretary of the Georgian Communist Party Eduard Shevardnadze, during a visit to the Georgian SSR in 1983

In November 1978, Gorbachev was appointed a secretary of the Central Committee. His appointment was approved unanimously by the Central Committee's members. To fill this position, Gorbachev and his wife moved to Moscow, where they were initially given an old dacha outside the city. They then moved to another, at Sosnovka, before being allocated a newly built brick house. He was given an apartment inside the city, but gave that to his daughter and son-in-law; Irina had begun work at Moscow's Second Medical Institute. As part of the Moscow political elite, Gorbachev and his wife now had access to better medical care and to specialized shops; they were given cooks, servants, bodyguards, and secretaries, many of these spies for the KGB. In his new position, Gorbachev often worked twelve to sixteen hour days. He and his wife socialized little, but liked to visit Moscow's theaters and museums.

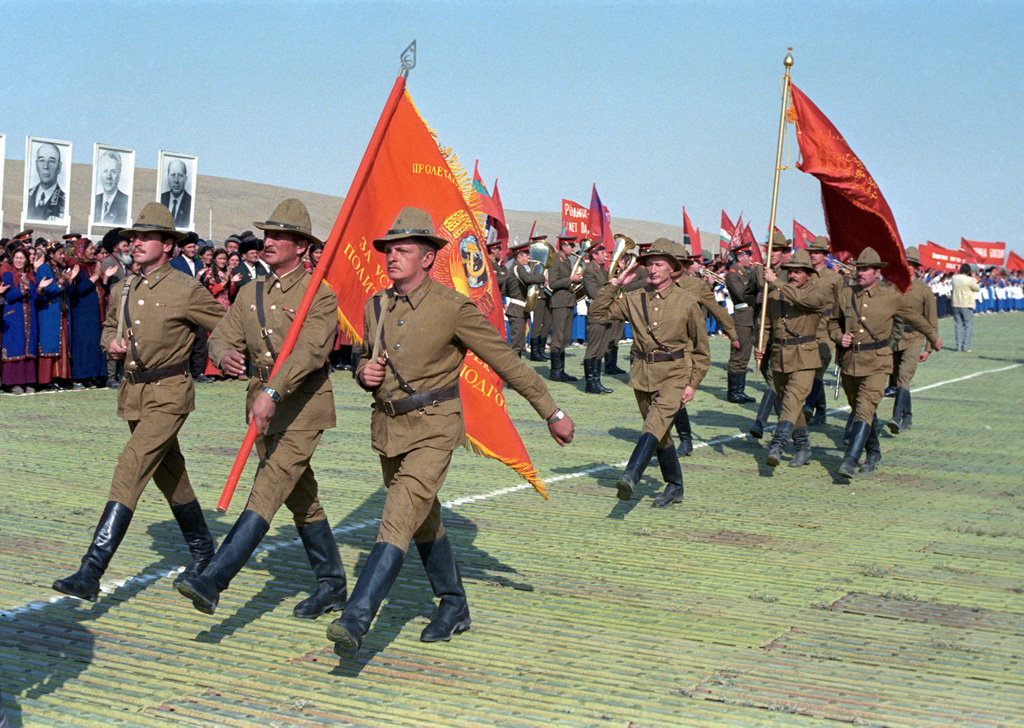
Gorbachev was skeptical of the deployment of Soviet troops in Afghanistan (pictured here in 1986).

In 1978, Gorbachev was appointed to the Central Committee's Secretariat for Agriculture (25th term), replacing his old patron Kulakov, who had died of a heart attack. Gorbachev concentrated his attentions on agriculture: the harvests of 1979, 1980, and 1981 were all poor, due largely to weather conditions, and the country had to import increasing quantities of grain. He had growing concerns about the country's agricultural management system, coming to regard it as overly centralized and requiring more bottom-up decision making; he raised these points at his first speech at a Central Committee Plenum, given in July 1978. He began to have concerns about other policies too. In December 1979, the Soviets sent the armed forces into neighboring Afghanistan to support its Soviet-aligned government against Islamist insurgents; Gorbachev privately thought it a mistake. At times he openly supported the government position; in October 1980 he for instance endorsed Soviet calls for Poland's Marxist–Leninist government to crack down on growing internal dissent in that country. That same month, he was promoted from a candidate member to a full member of the Politburo (25th term), becoming the youngest member of the highest decision-making authority in the Communist Party. After Brezhnev's death in November 1982, Andropov succeeded him as General Secretary of the Communist Party, the de facto leader in the Soviet Union. Gorbachev was enthusiastic about the appointment. However, although Gorbachev hoped that Andropov would introduce liberalizing reforms, the latter carried out only personnel shifts rather than structural change. Gorbachev became Andropov's closest ally in the Politburo; with Andropov's encouragement, Gorbachev sometimes chaired Politburo meetings. Andropov encouraged Gorbachev to expand into policy areas other than agriculture, preparing him for future higher office. In April 1983, in a sign of growing ascendancy, Gorbachev delivered the annual speech marking the birthday of the Soviet founder Vladimir Lenin; this required him re-reading many of Lenin's later writings, in which the latter had called for reform in the context of the New Economic Policy of the 1920s, and encouraged Gorbachev's own conviction that reform was needed. In May 1983, Gorbachev was sent to Canada, where he met Prime Minister Pierre Trudeau and spoke to the Canadian Parliament. There, he met and befriended the Soviet ambassador, Aleksandr Yakovlev, who later became a key political ally.

In February 1984, Andropov died; on his deathbed he indicated his desire that Gorbachev succeed him. Many in the Central Committee nevertheless thought the 53-year-old Gorbachev was too young and inexperienced. Instead, Konstantin Chernenko—a longstanding Brezhnev ally—was appointed general secretary, but he too was in very poor health. Chernenko was often too sick to chair Politburo meetings, with Gorbachev stepping in last minute. Gorbachev continued to cultivate allies both in the Kremlin and beyond, and gave the main speech at a conference on Soviet ideology, where he angered party hardliners by implying that the country required reform.

In April 1984, Gorbachev was appointed chair of the Foreign Affairs Committee of the highest organ of state authority in the Soviet Union, a largely honorific position. In June he traveled to Italy as a Soviet representative for the funeral of Italian Communist Party leader Enrico Berlinguer, and in September to Sofia, Bulgaria to attend celebrations of the fortieth anniversary of its liberation from the Nazis by the Red Army. In December, he visited Britain at the request of its prime minister Margaret Thatcher; she was aware that he was a potential reformer and wanted to meet him. At the end of the visit, Thatcher said: "I like Mr. Gorbachev. We can do business together". He felt that the visit helped to erode Andrei Gromyko's dominance of Soviet foreign policy and sent a signal to the United States government that he wanted to improve Soviet–US relations.

== Leader of the Soviet Union (1985–1991) ==
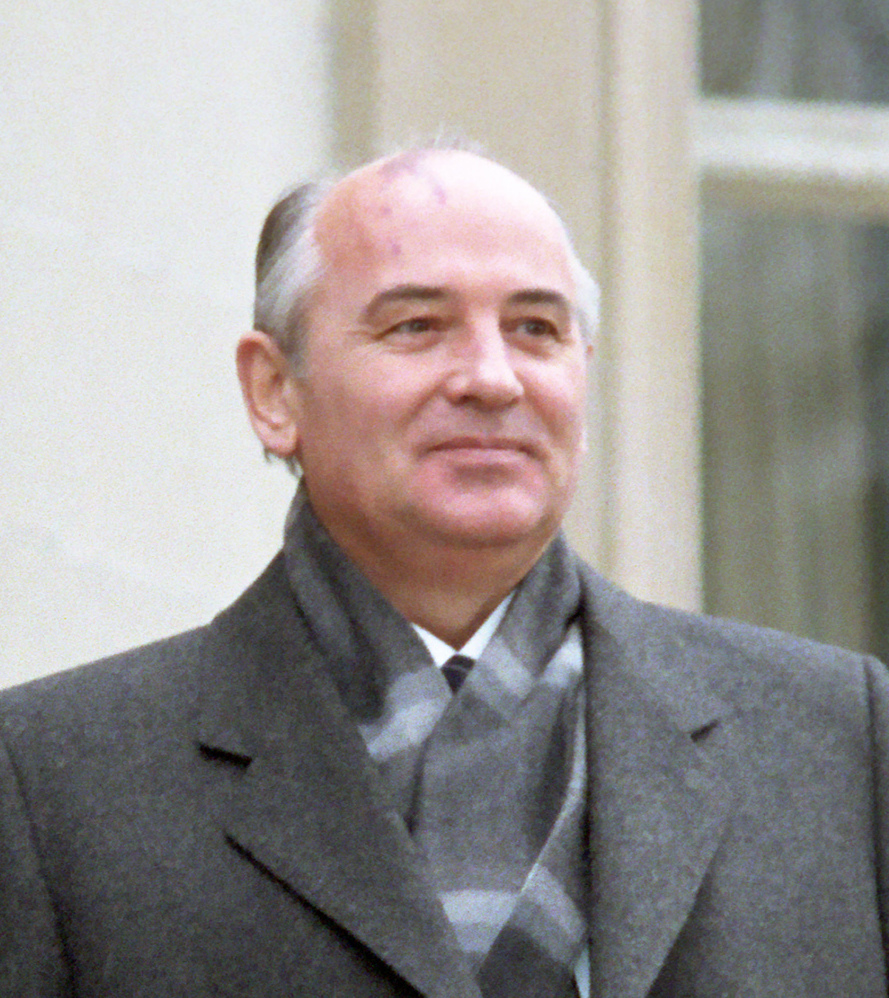
Gorbachev in 1985 at a summit in Geneva, Switzerland

On 11 March 1985, Mikhail Gorbachev was elected the eighth general secretary of the Communist Party of the Soviet Union by the Politburo of the CPSU after the death of Konstantin Chernenko.

While Gorbachev wanted to preserve the Soviet Union and Marxist-Leninist ideals, he recognized the need for significant reforms. He decided to withdraw troops from the Soviet–Afghan War and met with United States president Ronald Reagan at the Reykjavik Summit to discuss the limitation of nuclear weapons production and ending the Cold War. He also proposed a three-stage program for abolishing the world's nuclear weapons by the end of the 20th century.

Domestically, his policy of glasnost ("openness") allowed for the improvement of freedom of speech and free press, while his perestroika ("restructuring") sought to decentralize economic decision-making to improve its efficiency. Ultimately, Gorbachev's democratization efforts and formation of the elected Congress of People's Deputies undermined the supremacy the CPSU had in Soviet governance. When various Warsaw Pact countries abandoned Marxist–Leninist governance in 1989, he declined to intervene militarily. Growing nationalist sentiment within constituent republics threatened to break up the Soviet Union, leading the hardliners within the Communist Party to launch an unsuccessful coup against Gorbachev in August 1991.

== Unraveling of the USSR ==
In the Revolutions of 1989, most of the Marxist–Leninist states of Central and Eastern Europe held multi-party elections resulting in regime change. In most countries, like Poland and Hungary, this was achieved peacefully, but in Romania, the revolution turned violent, and led to Romanian leader Nicolae Ceaușescu's overthrow and execution. In 1989, he visited East Germany for the fortieth anniversary of its founding; shortly after, in November, the East German government allowed its citizens to cross the Berlin Wall, a decision Gorbachev praised. Over the following years, much of the wall was demolished. Neither Gorbachev nor Thatcher or Mitterrand wanted a swift reunification of Germany, aware that it would likely become the dominant European power. Gorbachev wanted a gradual process of German integration but Helmut Kohl began calling for rapid reunification. With German reunification in 1990, many observers declared the Cold War over.

=== 1990–1991: presidency of the Soviet Union ===
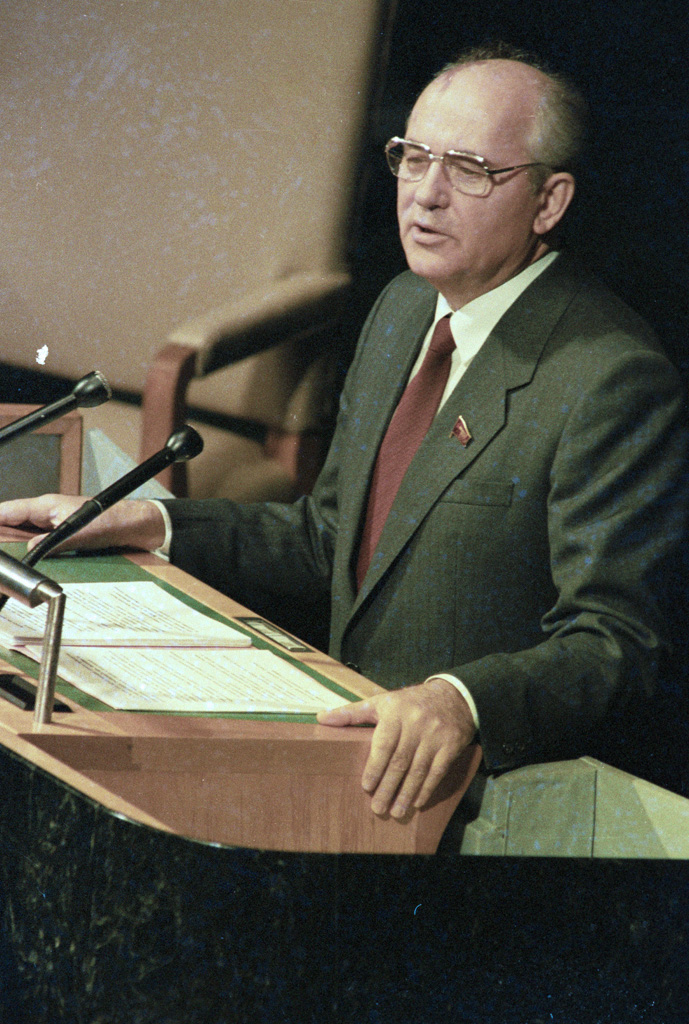
Gorbachev addressing the United Nations General Assembly in 1988. During the speech, he dramatically announced deep unilateral cuts in Soviet military forces in Eastern Europe.

In February 1990, both liberalizers and Marxist–Leninist hardliners intensified their attacks on Gorbachev. A liberalizer march took place in Moscow criticizing Communist Party rule, while at a Central Committee meeting, the hardliner Vladimir Brovikov accused Gorbachev of reducing the country to "anarchy" and "ruin" and of pursuing Western approval at the expense of the Soviet Union and the Marxist–Leninist cause. Gorbachev was aware that the Central Committee could still oust him as general secretary, and so decided to reformulate the role of head of government to a presidency from which he could not be removed. He decided that the presidential election should be held by the Congress of People's Deputies. He chose this over a public vote because he thought the latter would escalate tensions and feared that he might lose it; a spring 1990 poll nevertheless still showed him as the most popular politician in the country.

In March, the Congress of People's Deputies held the first (and only) Soviet presidential election, in which Gorbachev was the only candidate. He secured 1,329 in favor to 495 against; 313 votes were invalid or absent. He therefore became the first (and only) executive president of the Soviet Union. A new 18-member Presidential Council de facto replaced the Politburo. At the same Congress meeting, he presented the idea of repealing Article 6 of the Soviet constitution, which had ratified the Communist Party as the "ruling party" of the Soviet Union. The Congress passed the reform, undermining the de jure nature of the one-party state.

In the 1990 elections for the Russian Supreme Soviet, the Communist Party faced challengers from an alliance of liberalizers known as "Democratic Russia"; the latter did particularly well in urban centers. Yeltsin was elected the chair of the supreme state organ of power, something Gorbachev was unhappy about. That year, opinion polls showed Yeltsin overtaking Gorbachev as the most popular politician in the Soviet Union. Gorbachev struggled to understand Yeltsin's growing popularity, commenting: "he drinks like a fish ... he's inarticulate, he comes up with the devil knows what, he's like a worn-out record". The Russian Supreme Soviet was now out of Gorbachev's control; in June 1990, it declared that in the Russian Republic, its laws took precedence over those of the Soviet central government. Amid a growth in Russian nationalist sentiment, Gorbachev had reluctantly allowed the formation of a Communist Party of the Russian Soviet Federative Socialist Republic as a branch of the larger Soviet Communist Party. Gorbachev attended its first congress in June, but soon found it dominated by hardliners who opposed his reformist stance.

==== German reunification and the Gulf War ====
In January 1990, Gorbachev privately agreed to permit East German reunification with West Germany, but rejected the idea that a unified Germany could retain West Germany's NATO membership. His compromise that Germany might retain both NATO and Warsaw Pact memberships did not attract support. On 9 February 1990 in a phone conversation with James Baker, then the US secretary of state, he said that "a broadening of the NATO zone is not acceptable" to which Baker agreed. In May 1990, he visited the US for talks with President Bush; there, he agreed that an independent Germany would have the right to choose its international alliances. Ultimately he acquiesced to the reunification on the condition that NATO troops not be posted to the territory of Eastern Germany. There remains some confusion over whether US secretary of state James Baker led Gorbachev to believe that NATO would not expand into other countries in Eastern Europe. There was no oral or written US promise that explicitly said so. Gorbachev stated that he was only made such a promise regarding East Germany and that it was kept. In July, Kohl visited Moscow and Gorbachev informed him that the Soviets would not oppose a reunified Germany's being part of NATO. Domestically, Gorbachev's critics accused him of betraying the national interest; more broadly, they were angry that Gorbachev had allowed the Eastern Bloc to move away from direct Soviet influence.

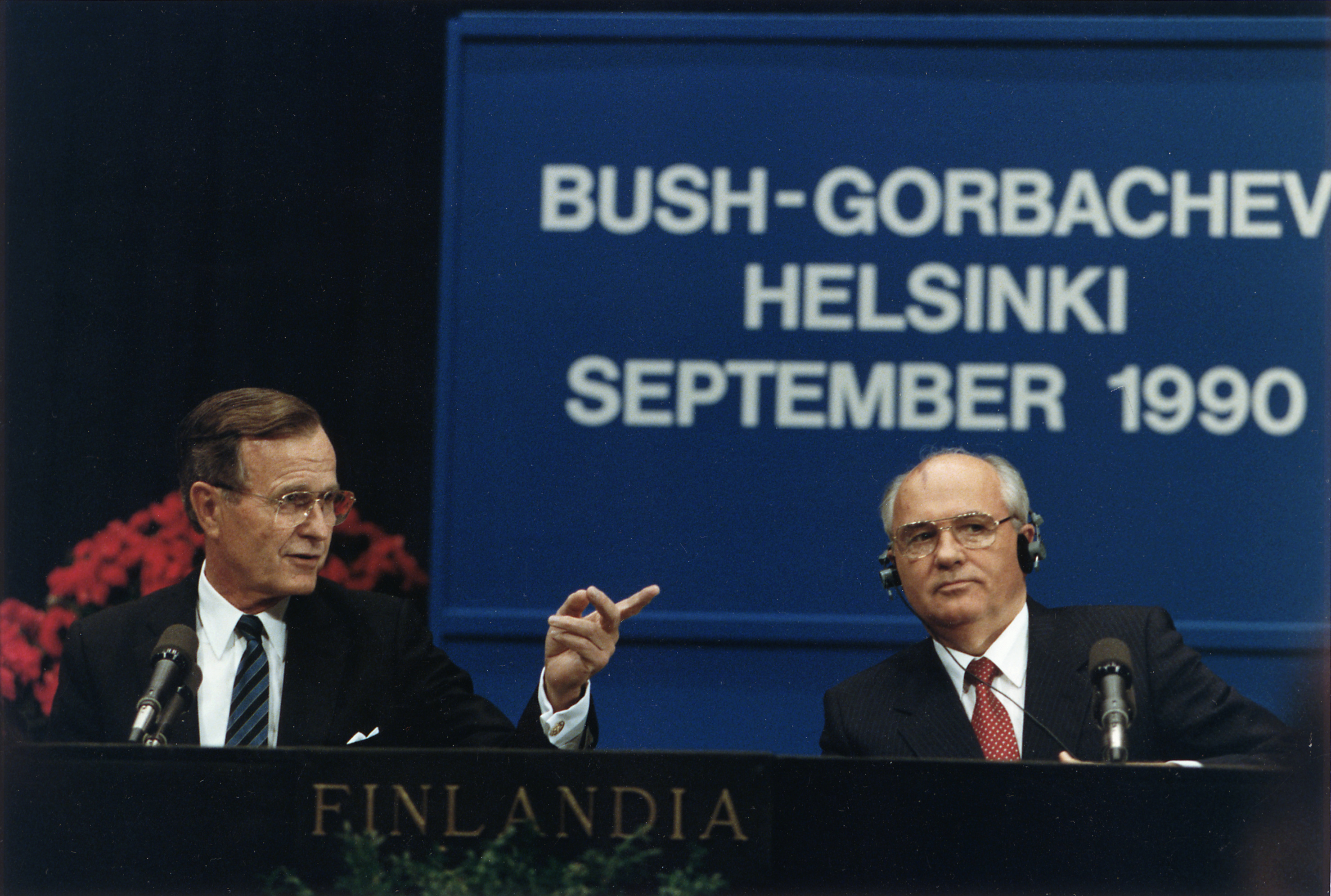
In September 1990, Gorbachev met repeatedly with US president George H. W. Bush at the Helsinki Summit.

In August 1990, Saddam Hussein's Iraqi government invaded Kuwait; Gorbachev endorsed President Bush's condemnation of it. This brought criticism from many in the Soviet state apparatus, who saw Hussein as a key ally in the Persian Gulf and feared for the safety of the 9,000 Soviet citizens in Iraq, although Gorbachev argued that the Iraqis were the clear aggressors. In November the Soviets endorsed a UN Resolution permitting force to be used in expelling the Iraqi Army from Kuwait. Gorbachev later called it a "watershed" in world politics, "the first time the superpowers acted together in a regional crisis". However, when the US announced plans for a ground invasion, Gorbachev opposed it, urging instead a peaceful solution. In October 1990, Gorbachev was awarded the Nobel Peace Prize; he was flattered but acknowledged "mixed feelings" about the accolade. Polls indicated that 90% of Soviet citizens disapproved of the award, widely seen as an anti-Soviet accolade.

With the Soviet budget deficit climbing and no domestic money markets to provide the state with loans, Gorbachev looked elsewhere. Throughout 1991, Gorbachev requested sizable loans from Western countries and Japan, hoping to keep the Soviet economy afloat and ensure the success of perestroika. Although the Soviet Union had been excluded from the G7, Gorbachev secured an invitation to its London summit in July 1991. There, he continued to call for financial assistance; Mitterrand and Kohl backed him, while Thatcher—no longer in office—urged Western leaders to agree. Most G7 members were reluctant, instead offering technical assistance and proposing the Soviets receive "special associate" status—rather than full membership—of the World Bank and International Monetary Fund. Gorbachev was frustrated that the US would spend $100 billion on the Gulf War but would not offer his country loans. Other countries were more forthcoming; West Germany had given the Soviets DM60 billion by mid-1991. Bush visited Moscow in late July, when he and Gorbachev concluded ten years of negotiations by signing the START I treaty, a bilateral agreement on the reduction and limitation of strategic offensive arms.

==== August coup and government crises ====
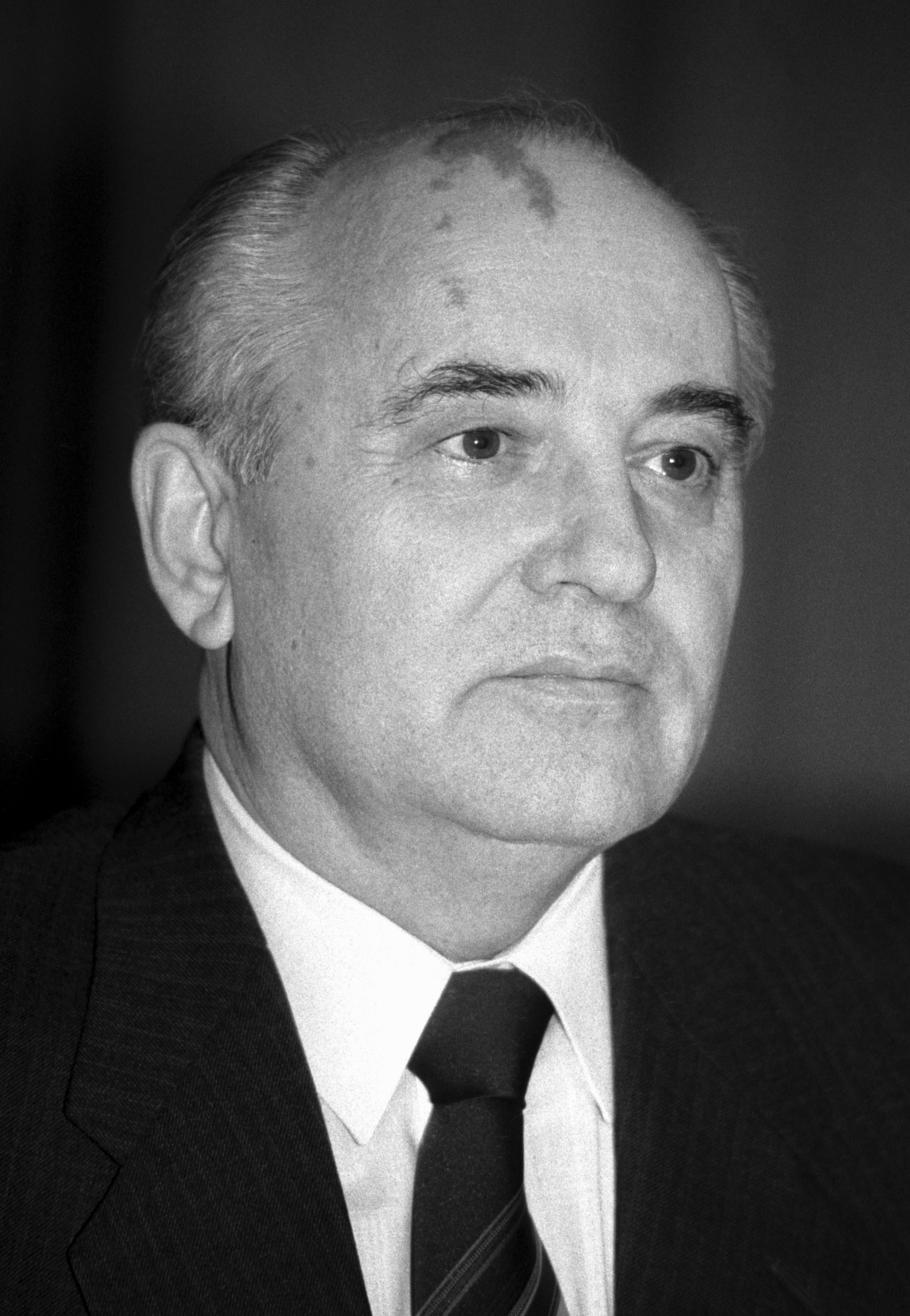
Gorbachev in October 1991

At the 28th Communist Party Congress in July 1990, hardliners criticized the reformists, but Gorbachev was re-elected party leader. Seeking compromise with the liberalizers, Gorbachev assembled a team of his own and Yeltsin's advisers to come up with an economic reform package: the result was the "500 Days" program. This called for further decentralization and some privatization. In September, Yeltsin presented the plan to the Russian Supreme Soviet, which backed it. Many in the Communist Party and state apparatus warned against it, and it was abandoned.

By mid-November 1990, much of the press was calling for Gorbachev to resign and predicting civil war. In November, he announced an eight-point program with governmental reforms, among them the abolition of the presidential council. By this point, Gorbachev was isolated from many of his former close allies and aides. Yakovlev had moved out of his inner circle and Eduard Shevardnadze had resigned.

Amid growing dissent in the Baltics, in January 1991 Gorbachev demanded that the Lithuanian Supreme Council rescind its pro-independence reforms. Soviet troops occupied buildings in Vilnius and attacked protesters, 15 of whom were killed. A referendum on the issue brought 76.4% in favor of continued federation; the six rebellious republics had not taken part. Negotiations took place to decide what form the new constitution would take; it was planned to be signed in August.

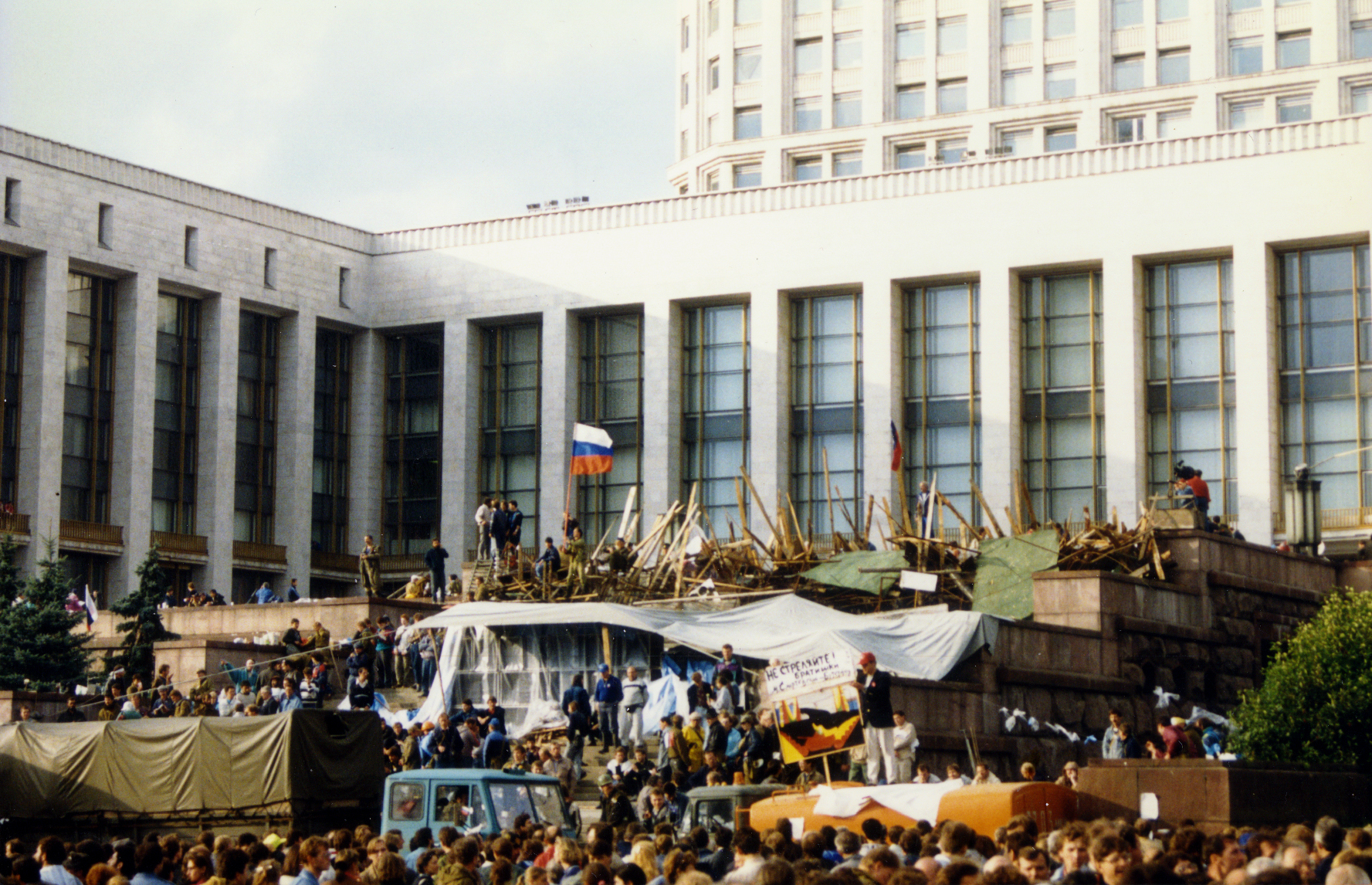
Tens of thousands of anti-coup protesters surrounding the White House in Moscow

In August, Gorbachev holidayed at his dacha in Foros, Crimea. Two weeks into his holiday, a group of senior Communist Party figures—the "Gang of Eight" launched a coup d'état. The coup leaders demanded that Gorbachev declare a state of emergency, but he refused. He was kept under house arrest in the dacha. The coup plotters publicly announced that Gorbachev was ill and thus Vice President Yanayev would take charge of the country.

Yeltsin entered the Moscow White House. Protesters prevented troops storming the building to arrest him. In front of the White House, Yeltsin, atop a tank, gave a memorable speech condemning the coup. The coup's leaders realized that they lacked sufficient support and ended their efforts. Gorbachev returned to Moscow and thanked Yeltsin. Two days later, he resigned as general secretary.

=== Final days and collapse ===
After the coup, the Supreme Soviet indefinitely suspended all Communist Party activity, effectively ending communist rule in the Soviet Union.

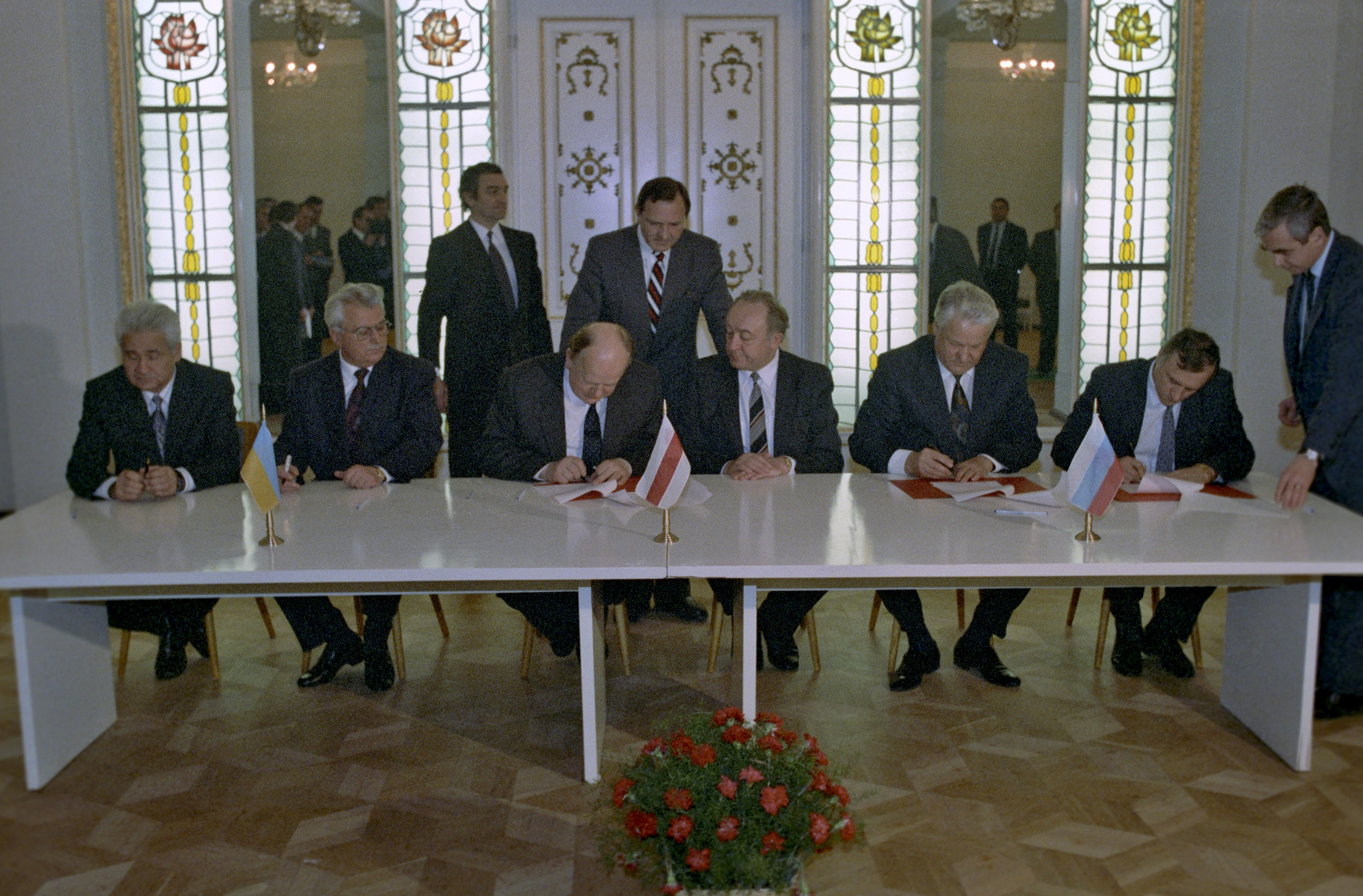
Leaders of the Soviet Republics sign the Belovezha Accords, which eliminated the USSR and established the Commonwealth of Independent States, 1991

On 30 October, Gorbachev attended a conference in Madrid trying to revive the Israeli–Palestinian peace process. The event was co-sponsored by the US and Soviet Union. There, he again met with Bush. En route home, he traveled to France where he stayed with Mitterrand at the latter's home near Bayonne.

To maintain unity, Gorbachev continued to plan for a union treaty, but met opposition to the continuation of a federal state as the leaders of several Soviet republics bowed to nationalist pressure. Yeltsin stated that he would veto any idea of a unified state, instead favoring a confederation with little central authority. Only the leaders of Kazakhstan and Kirghizia supported Gorbachev's approach. The referendum in Ukraine on 1 December with a 90% turnout for secession from the Union was a fatal blow; Gorbachev had expected Ukrainians to reject independence.

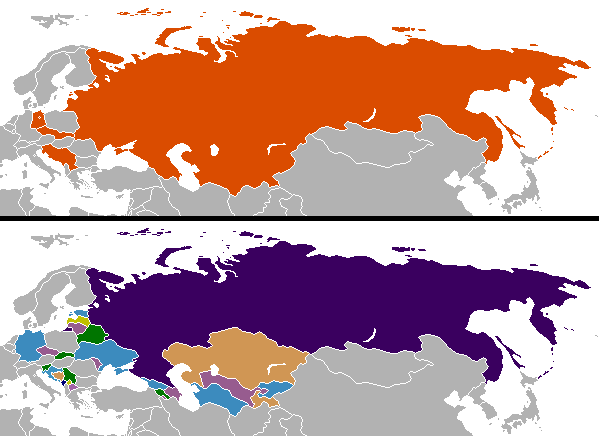
Changes in national boundaries after the end of the Cold War and the dissolution of the Soviet Union in 1991

Without Gorbachev's knowledge, Yeltsin met with Ukrainian president Leonid Kravchuk and Belarusian president Stanislav Shushkevich in Belovezha Forest, near Brest, Belarus, on 8 December and signed the Belavezha Accords, which declared the Soviet Union had ceased to exist and formed the Commonwealth of Independent States (CIS) as its successor. Gorbachev only learned of this development when Shushkevich phoned him; Gorbachev was furious. He desperately looked for an opportunity to preserve the Soviet Union, hoping that the media and intelligentsia would rally against its dissolution. Ukrainian, Belarusian, and Russian Supreme Soviets then ratified the establishment of the CIS. On 9 December, Gorbachev issued a statement calling the CIS agreement "illegal and dangerous". On 20 December, the leaders of 11 of the 12 remaining republics—all except Georgia—met in Kazakhstan and signed the Alma-Ata Protocol, agreeing to dismantle the Soviet Union and formally establish the CIS. They provisionally accepted Gorbachev's resignation as president of what remained of the Soviet Union. Accepting the fait accompli, Gorbachev said he would resign as soon as he saw that the CIS was a reality.

Gorbachev reached a deal with Yeltsin that called for Gorbachev to announce his resignation as Soviet president and Commander-in-Chief on 25 December, vacating the Kremlin by 29 December. Yakovlev, Chernyaev and Shevardnadze joined Gorbachev to help him write a resignation speech. Gorbachev gave his speech in the Kremlin in front of television cameras, for international broadcast. In it, he announced, "I hereby discontinue my activities at the post of President of the Union of Soviet Socialist Republics." He expressed regret for the breakup of the Soviet Union but cited what he saw as the achievements of his administration: political and religious freedom, the end of totalitarianism, the introduction of democracy and a market economy, and an end to the arms race and Cold War. Gorbachev was the third out of eight Soviet leaders, after Malenkov and Khrushchev, not to die in office. The following day, 26 December, the Soviet of the Republics, the upper house of the Supreme Soviet of the Soviet Union, voted the country out of existence. As of 31 December 1991, all Soviet institutions that had not been taken over by Russia ceased to function.

== Post-USSR life ==
=== 1991–1999: Initial years ===
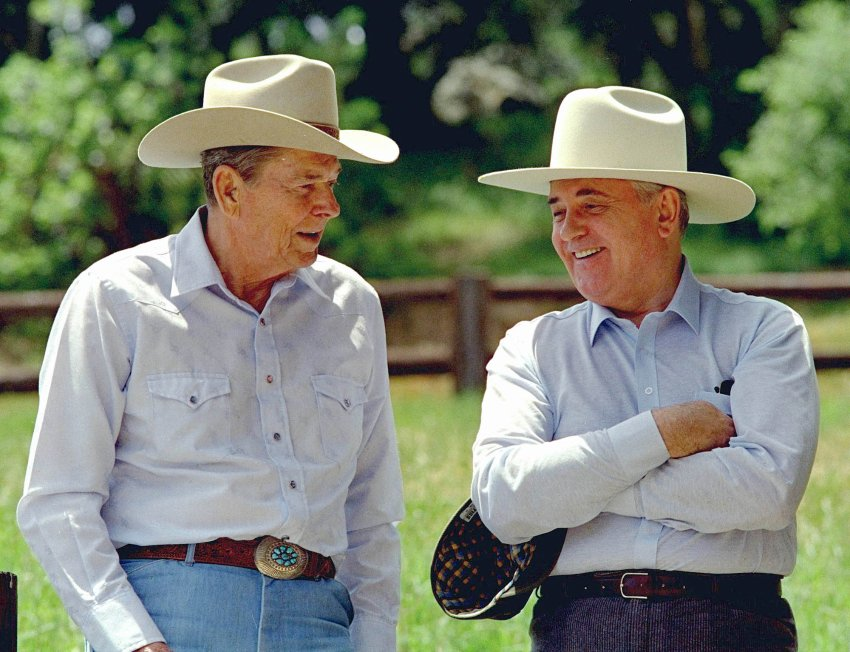
Gorbachev visiting Reagan, at Reagan's ranch and vacation home in 1992

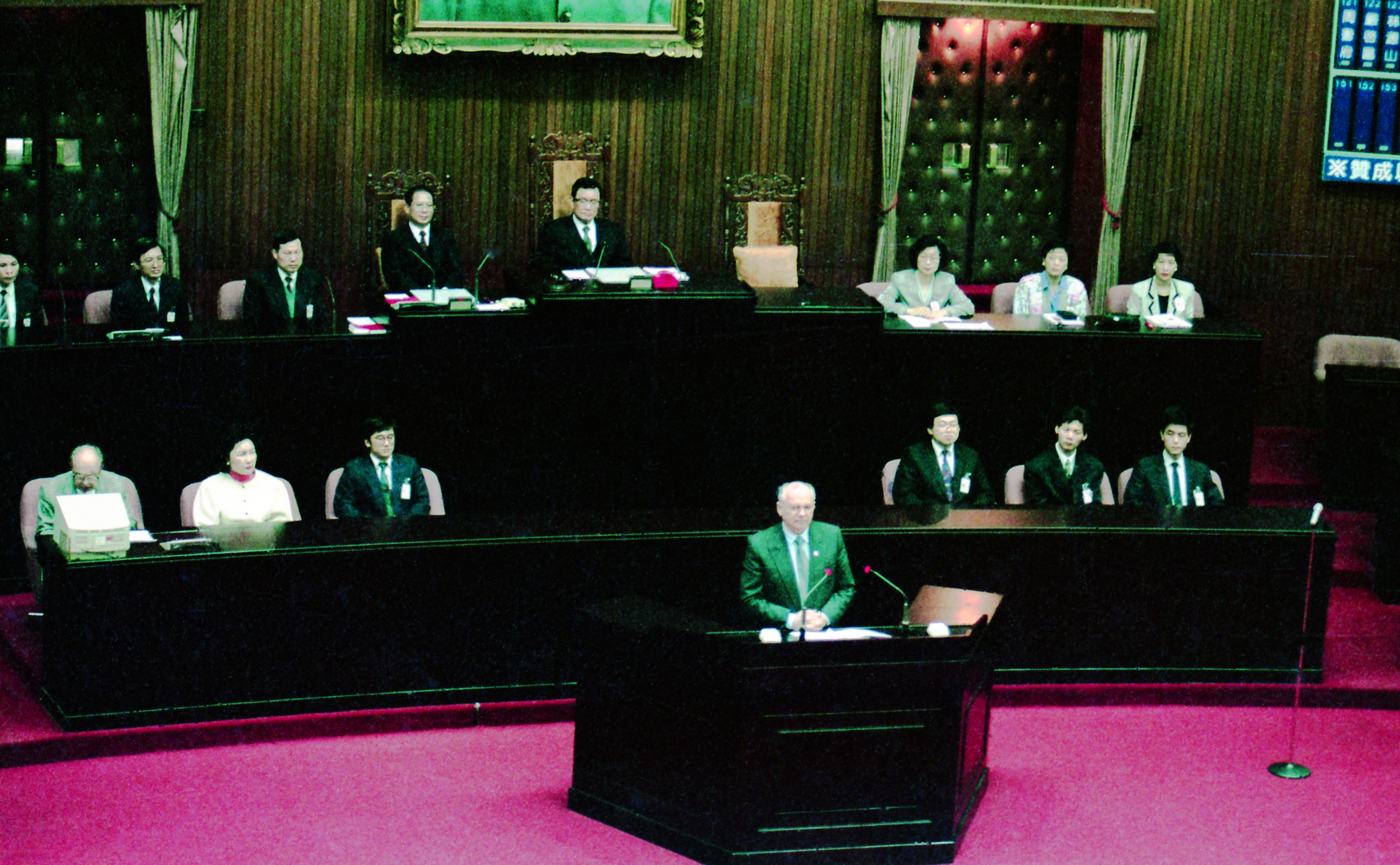
Gorbachev giving a speech at the Legislative Yuan in Taiwan, 1994

Out of office, he and Raisa initially lived in their dilapidated dacha on Rublevskoe Shosse, and were allowed to privatize their smaller apartment on Kosygin Street. He focused on establishing his foundation, launched in March 1992; Yakovlev and Revenko were its first vice presidents. Its initial tasks were analyzing and publishing material on the history of perestroika, and defending the policy. The foundation tasked itself with monitoring and critiquing life in post-Soviet Russia, presenting alternative development forms to Yeltsin's.

To finance his foundation, Gorbachev began lecturing internationally, charging large fees. On a visit to Japan, he was given multiple honorary degrees. In 1992, he toured the US in a Forbes private jet to raise money for his foundation, meeting the Reagans for a social visit. From there he went to Spain, where he met with his friend Prime Minister Felipe González. He further visited Israel and Germany, where he was received warmly for his role in facilitating German reunification. To supplement his lecture fees and book sales, Gorbachev appeared in television commercials and photograph advertisements, enabling him to keep the foundation afloat. With his wife's assistance, he worked on his memoirs, which were published in Russian in 1995 and in English the following year. He began writing a monthly syndicated column for The New York Times.

In 1993, Gorbachev launched Green Cross International, which focused on encouraging sustainable futures, and then the World Political Forum. In 1995, he initiated the World Summit of Nobel Peace Laureates.

External videos
- Booknotes interview with Gorbachev on his memoirs, 24 November 1996, C-SPAN

Gorbachev and Yeltsin soon resumed their criticism of each other, for example when Yeltsin lifted price caps and plunged many Russians into poverty. In 1995, his foundation held a conference on "The Intelligentsia and Perestroika", proposing to the Duma a law that would reduce many of the presidential powers established by Yeltsin's 1993 constitution.

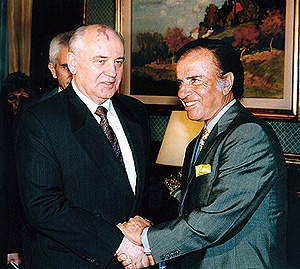
Gorbachev with Argentine president Carlos Menem in 1999

In contrast to her husband's political activities, Raisa focused on campaigning for children's charities. In 1997, she founded a sub-division of the Gorbachev Foundation known as Raisa Maksimovna's Club to improve women's welfare in Russia. The Foundation had initially been housed in the former Social Science Institute building, but Yeltsin introduced limits to the number of rooms it could use there; the American philanthropist Ted Turner donated over $1 million to enable the foundation to build new premises on the Leningradsky Prospekt. In 1999, Gorbachev visited Australia, giving a speech to the country's parliament. Shortly after, in July, Raisa was diagnosed with leukemia. With the assistance of German chancellor Gerhard Schröder, she was transferred to a cancer center in Münster, Germany, and underwent chemotherapy. She died in September, and Gorbachev's daughter Irina and his two granddaughters moved into his Moscow home to live with him.

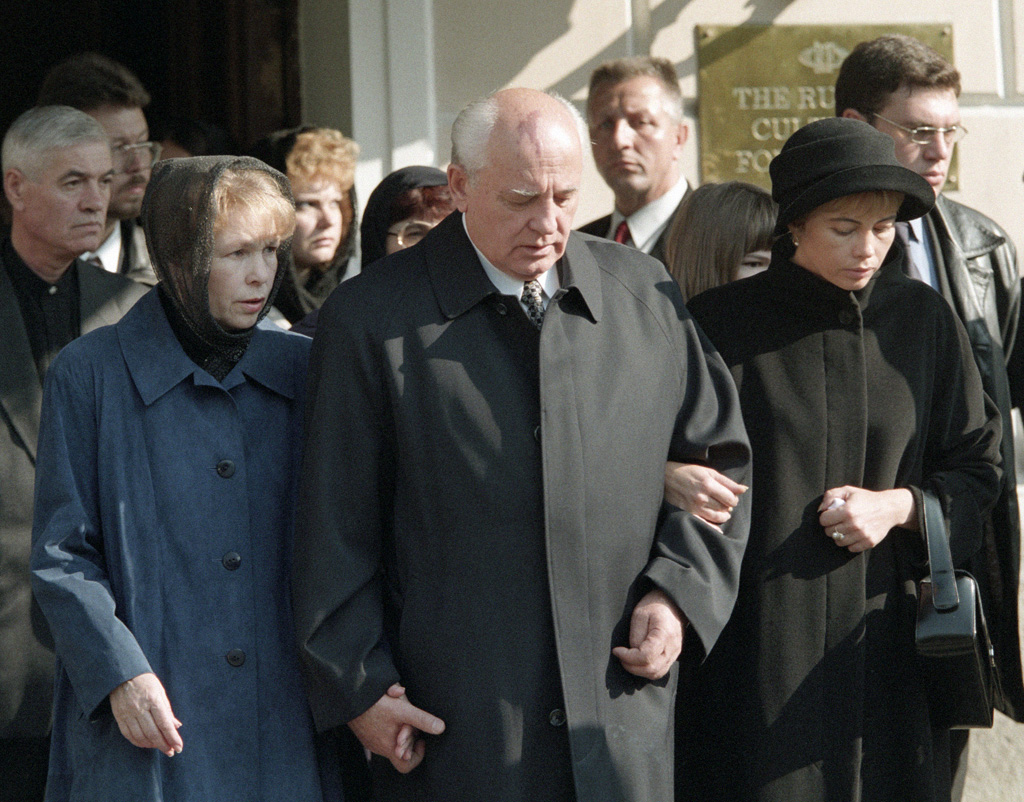
Gorbachev, daughter Irina and his wife's sister Lyudmila at the funeral of Raisa, 1999

==== 1996 presidential campaign ====
The Russian presidential elections were scheduled for June 1996, and although he was urged not to run, Gorbachev decided to do so. He never expected to win outright, but thought a centrist bloc could be formed around either himself or one of the other candidates with similar views, such as Grigory Yavlinsky, Svyatoslav Fyodorov, or Alexander Lebed. After securing the necessary one million signatures of nomination, he announced his candidacy in March. Launching his campaign, he traveled across Russia giving rallies in twenty cities. He repeatedly faced anti-Gorbachev protesters, while some pro-Yeltsin local officials tried to hamper his campaign by banning local media from covering it or by refusing him access to venues. In the election, Gorbachev came seventh with approximately 386,000 votes, or around 0.5% of the total. Yeltsin and Zyuganov went through to the second round, where the former was victorious.

=== 1999–2008: Promoting social democracy in Putin's Russia ===
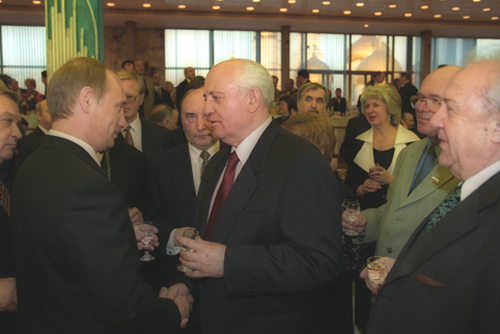
Gorbachev attended the inauguration of Vladimir Putin in May 2000.

In December 1999, Yeltsin resigned and was succeeded by his deputy, Vladimir Putin, who won the March 2000 presidential election. Gorbachev initially welcomed Putin's rise, seeing him as an anti-Yeltsin figure. Although he spoke out against some of the Putin government's actions, Gorbachev praised the new government in 2002. At the time, he believed Putin to be a committed democrat who nevertheless had to use "a certain dose of authoritarianism" to stabilize the economy and rebuild the state after the Yeltsin era. At Putin's request, Gorbachev became co-chair of the "Petersburg Dialogue" project between high-ranking Russians and Germans.

In 2000, Gorbachev helped form the Russian United Social Democratic Party. In June 2002, he participated in a meeting with Putin, who praised the venture. In 2003, Gorbachev's party merged with the Social Democratic Party to form the Social Democratic Party of Russia, but it failed to gain traction with voters. Gorbachev resigned as party leader in May 2004 after the 2003 election campaign. The party was banned in 2007 by the Supreme Court of the Russian Federation due to its failure to establish local offices with at least 500 members in the majority of Russian regions. Later that year, Gorbachev founded a new movement, the Union of Social Democrats, stating that it would not contest the forthcoming elections.

Gorbachev was critical of US hostility to Putin, arguing that the US government "doesn't want Russia to rise" again as a global power, but wanted to be "the sole superpower". Gorbachev was critical of US policy following the Cold War, arguing that the West had attempted to "turn [Russia] into some kind of backwater". He rejected Bush's claim that the US had "won" the Cold War, arguing that both sides had cooperated to end the conflict. He was critical of how the US had broken its word and expanded NATO right up to Russia's borders. He spoke out against the 1999 NATO bombing of Yugoslavia because it lacked UN backing, and the 2003 invasion of Iraq led by the US.

=== 2008–2022: Growing criticism of Vladimir Putin ===
In September 2008, Gorbachev and business oligarch Alexander Lebedev announced they would form the Independent Democratic Party of Russia. After the outbreak of the Russo-Georgian War, Gorbachev spoke out against US support for Georgian president Mikheil Saakashvili. Gorbachev nevertheless remained critical of Russia's government.

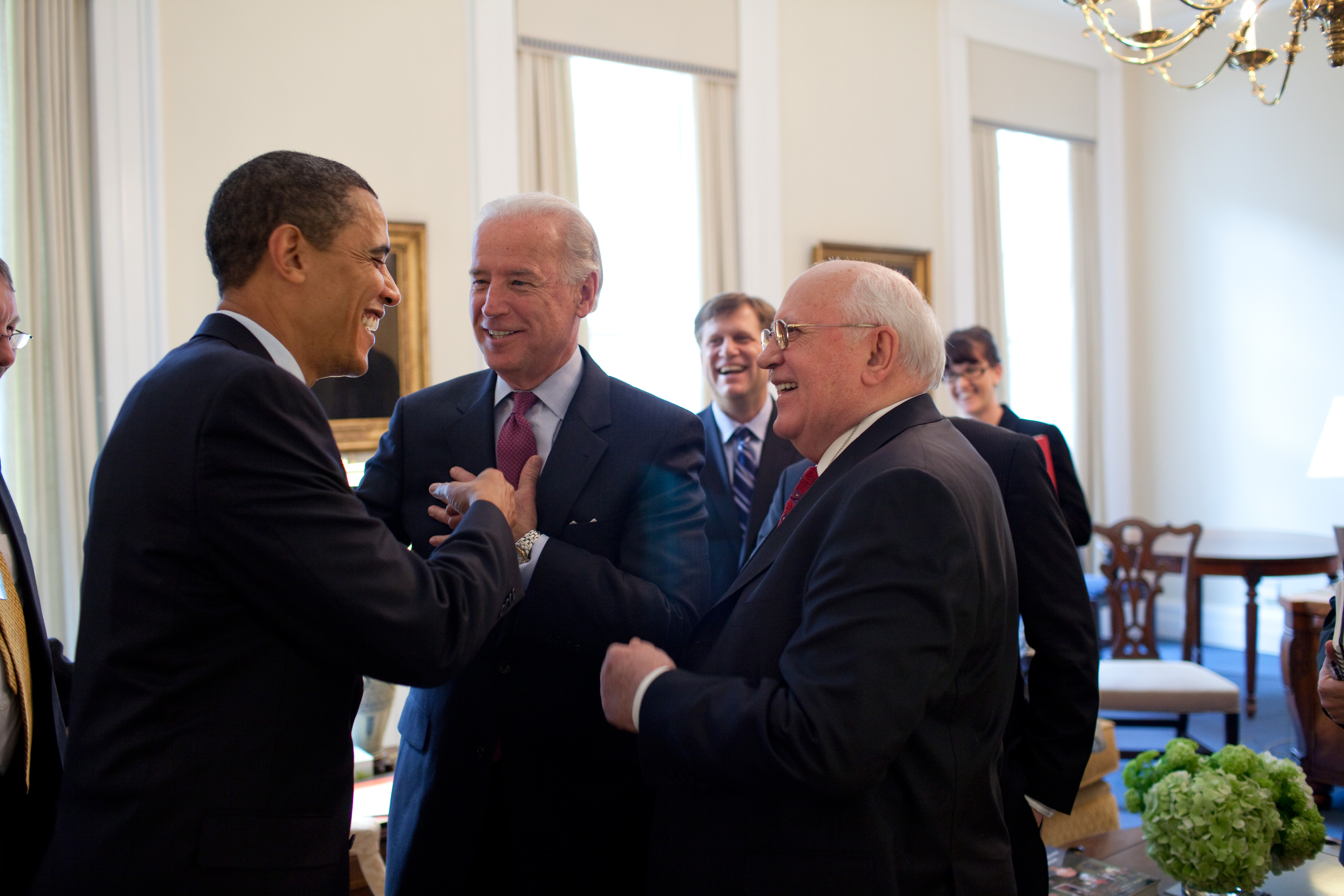
Gorbachev (right) being introduced to US president Barack Obama by US vice president Joe Biden, March 2009. US ambassador to Russia Michael McFaul is pictured in the background.

In 2009, he met with US president Barack Obama to "reset" strained US–Russian relations. In 2011, Medvedev awarded him the Order of St Andrew the Apostle the First-Called.

Gorbachev opposed Putin's decision to run for president in the 2012 election.

In 2014, he defended the Crimean status referendum and Russia's annexation of Crimea that began the Russo-Ukrainian War. He spoke out against the sanctions placed on Russia as a result of the annexation.

Russia can succeed only through democracy. Russia is ready for political competition, a real multiparty system, fair elections and regular rotation of government. This should define the role and responsibility of the president.

— Gorbachev, 2017

At a 2014 event marking 25 years since the fall of the Berlin Wall, Gorbachev warned that the ongoing war in Donbas had brought the world to the brink of a new Cold War, and he accused the US of adopting an attitude of "triumphalism" towards Russia. In 2016, he said that "Politicians who think that problems and disputes can be solved by using military force... should be rejected by society, they should clear the political stage." In June 2018, he welcomed the Russia–United States summit in Helsinki between Putin and US president Donald Trump. After the January 6 United States Capitol attack, Gorbachev declared, "The storming of the capitol was clearly planned in advance, and it's obvious by whom."

In July 2022, Gorbachev's close friend, journalist Alexei Venediktov, said that Gorbachev was very upset when he found out about the 2022 Russian invasion of Ukraine. According to Venediktov, Gorbachev believed that Putin "destroyed his life's work", and was calling for "an early cessation of hostilities and immediate start of peace negotiations".

== Political ideology ==
In the early 1950s, Gorbachev was conventionally Stalinist. By the mid-1980s, when he took power, Gorbachev argued that the Communist Party had to adapt and engage in creative thinking much as Lenin had earlier creatively interpreted and adapted the writings of Karl Marx and Friedrich Engels to the situation of early 20th-century Russia. However, the changes that Gorbachev proposed fitted completely within Marxist-Leninist ideology. According to Doder and Branson, Gorbachev's outlook was shaped in part by his long provincial career in Stavropol, where he held regional party posts for 23 years. Perestroika was harder to define, and its meaning shifted with time. It originally meant "radical reform of the economic and political system". Later, Gorbachev began to consider market mechanisms and co-operatives. Gorbachev however remained a believer in socialism, if not in the actual Soviet system. During the 1980s, his thought radically shifted, to the extent that by 1989 or 1990, he was effectively a social democrat.

== Personal life ==
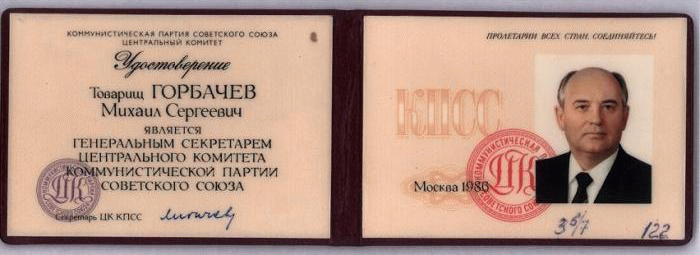
The official Soviet portrait of Gorbachev. Many official photographs and visual depictions of Gorbachev removed the port-wine birthmark from his head.

Gorbachev spoke in a southern Russian accent, and sang both folk and pop songs. He frequently referred to himself in the third person. Throughout his life, he tried to dress fashionably. Having an aversion to hard liquor, he drank sparingly and did not smoke. He was protective of his private life and cherished his wife and family. He sent his daughter, his only child, to a local school in Stavropol rather than to one for the children of party elites. Unlike many of his contemporaries in the Soviet administration, he treated women respectfully.

Gorbachev was baptized Russian Orthodox; his grandparents had been practicing Christians. In 2008, after he visited the tomb of St Francis of Assisi, he clarified that he was an atheist. Gorbachev considered himself an intellectual; Doder and Branson thought that "his intellectualism was slightly self-conscious", noting that unlike most Russian intelligentsia, Gorbachev was not closely connected "to the world of science, culture, the arts, or education". When living in Stavropol, he and his wife collected hundreds of books. Among his favorite authors were Arthur Miller, Dostoevsky, and Chinghiz Aitmatov, while he also enjoyed reading detective fiction. He enjoyed going for walks, having a love of natural environments, and was also a fan of association football. He favored small gatherings where the assembled discussed topics like art and philosophy rather than the large, alcohol-fueled parties common among Soviet officials.

== Death ==
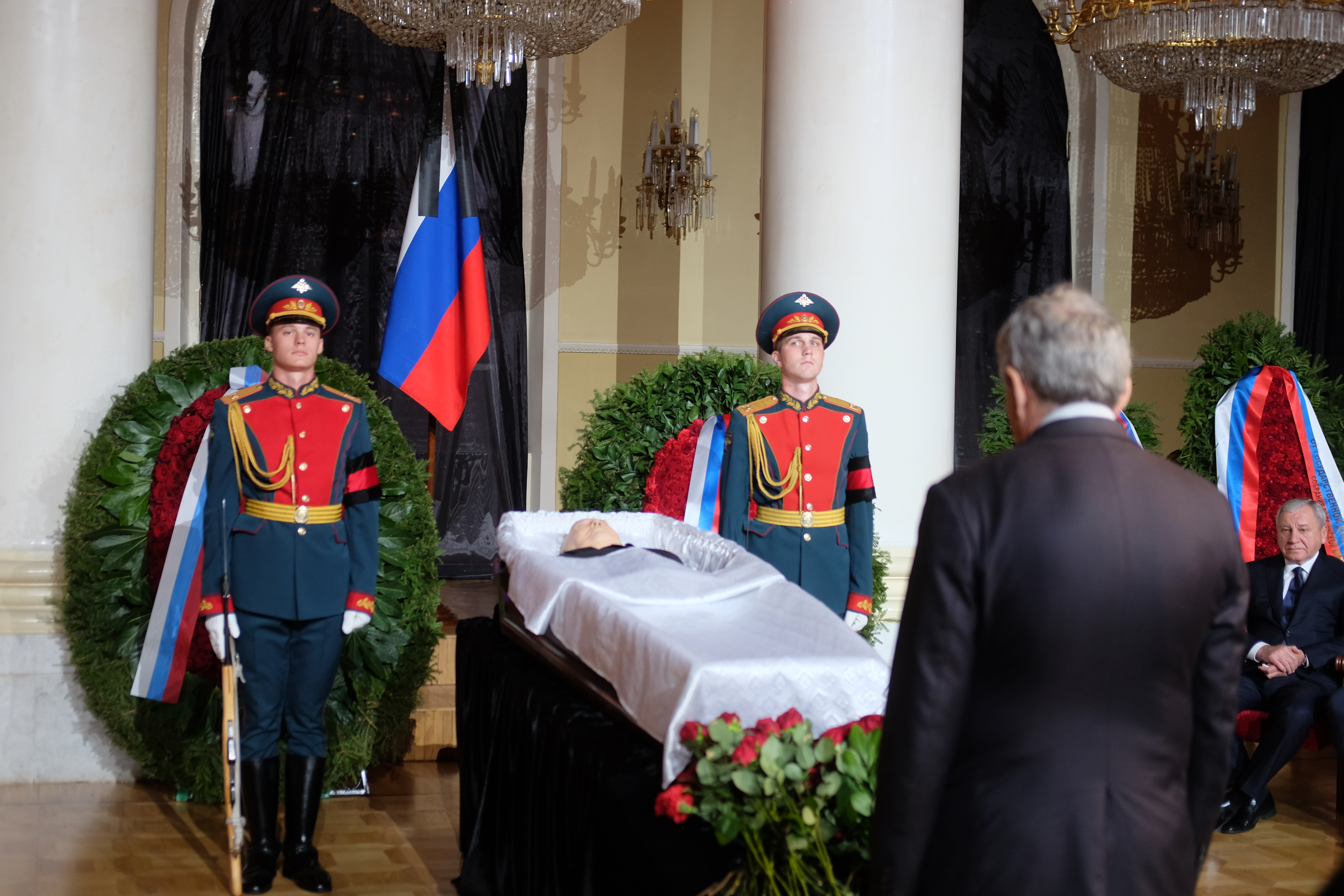
Gorbachev lying in state at the House of Unions

Gorbachev died at the Central Clinical Hospital in Moscow on 30 August 2022, at the age of 91. He died after a "severe and prolonged illness". He had suffered from severe diabetes and underwent several surgeries and hospital stays.

His funeral was held on 3 September 2022 in the Column Hall of the House of Unions. The ceremony included an honor guard, but was not a state funeral. The service included rites administered by a Russian Orthodox priest. He is buried at Moscow's Novodevichy Cemetery, in the same grave as his wife Raisa, as requested by his will.

== Reception and legacy ==
Opinions on Gorbachev are deeply divided. According to a 2017 survey carried out by the independent institute Levada Center, 46% of Russian citizens have a negative opinion towards Gorbachev, 30% are indifferent, while only 15% have a positive opinion. Many, particularly in Western countries, see him as the greatest statesman of the second half of the 20th century. US press referred to the presence of "Gorbymania" in Western countries during the late 1980s and early 1990s, as represented by large crowds that turned out to greet his visits, with Time naming him its "Man of the Decade" in the 1980s. In the Soviet Union itself, during Gorbachev's time as General Secretary, opinion polls indicated that he was the most popular politician from 1985 through to late 1989. His domestic supporters saw him as a reformer trying to modernize the Soviet Union, and to build democratic socialism. Taubman characterized Gorbachev as "a visionary who changed his country and the world—though neither as much as he wished". Taubman regarded Gorbachev as being "exceptional ... as a Russian ruler and a world statesman", highlighting that he avoided the "traditional, authoritarian, anti-Western norm" of both predecessors like Brezhnev and successors like Putin. McCauley thought that in allowing the Soviet Union to move away from Marxism–Leninism, Gorbachev gave the Soviet people "something precious, the right to think and manage their lives for themselves", with inevitable uncertainty and risk. The Lithuanian foreign minister Gabrielius Landsbergis said that Lithuanians would not glorify Gorbachev or forget about the 1991 January Events.

Gorbachev succeeded in destroying what was left of totalitarianism in the Soviet Union; he brought freedom of speech, of assembly, and of conscience to people who had never known it, except perhaps for a few chaotic months in 1917. By introducing free elections and creating parliamentary institutions, he laid the groundwork for democracy. It is more the fault of the raw material he worked with than of his own real shortcomings and mistakes that Russian democracy will take much longer to build than he thought.

— Gorbachev biographer William Taubman, 2017

External videos
- Q&A interview with William Taubman on Gorbachev: His Life and Times, 15 October 2017, C-SPAN

Gorbachev's negotiations with the US helped bring an end to the Cold War and reduced the threat of nuclear conflict. His decision to allow the Eastern Bloc to break apart prevented significant bloodshed in Central and Eastern Europe; as Taubman noted, this meant that the "Soviet Empire" ended in a far more peaceful manner than the British Empire several decades before. Similarly, under Gorbachev, the Soviet Union broke apart without falling into civil war, as happened during the breakup of Yugoslavia at the same time. McCauley noted that in facilitating the merger of East and West Germany, Gorbachev was "a co-father of German unification", assuring him long-term popularity among the German people.

He faced domestic criticism during his rule. He attracted the admiration of some colleagues, but others came to hate him. Across society, his inability to reverse the decline in the Soviet economy brought discontent. Liberals thought he lacked the radicalism to break from Marxism–Leninism and establish a free market liberal democracy. Conversely, many of his Communist Party critics thought his reforms were reckless and threatened the survival of Soviet socialism; some believed he should have followed the example of China's Communist Party and restricted himself to economic rather than governmental reforms. Many Russians saw his emphasis on persuasion rather than force as a sign of weakness.

The Communist Party nomenklatura saw the Soviet Union's dissolution as disastrous, as it resulted in their loss of power. In Russia, he is widely despised for his role in the collapse of the Soviet Union and the ensuing economic collapse in the 1990s. General Varennikov, one of those who orchestrated the 1991 coup attempt against Gorbachev, for instance called him "a renegade and traitor to your own people". His critics attacked him for allowing the Marxist–Leninist governments across Eastern Europe to fall, and for allowing a reunited Germany to join NATO, something they deem contrary to Russia's national interest. The leader of the Communist Party, Gennady Zyuganov, stated that Gorbachev was a leader whose rule brought "absolute sadness, misfortune and problems" for "all the peoples of our country".

The historian Mark Galeotti stressed the connection between Gorbachev and his predecessor, Andropov. In Galeotti's view, Andropov was "the godfather of the Gorbachev revolution", because—as a former head of the KGB—he was able to put forward the case for reform without having his loyalty to the Soviet cause questioned. According to McCauley, Gorbachev "set reforms in motion without understanding where they could lead. Never in his worst nightmare could he have imagined that perestroika would lead to the destruction of the Soviet Union".

According to The New York Times, "Few leaders in the 20th century, indeed in any century, have had such a profound effect on their time. In little more than six tumultuous years, Mr. Gorbachev lifted the Iron Curtain, decisively altering the political climate of the world."

== Awards and honors ==
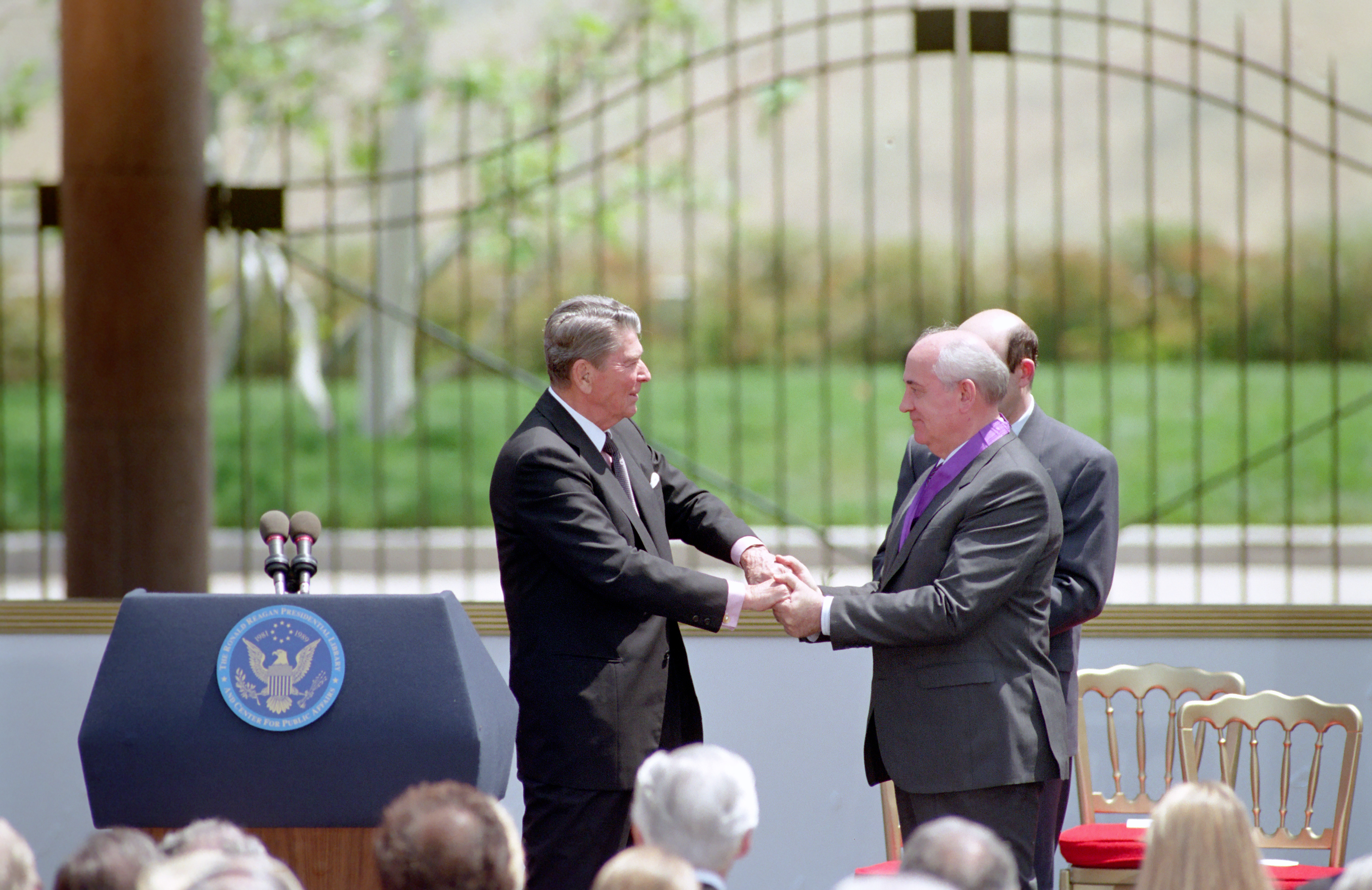
Former US president Ronald Reagan awards the first Ronald Reagan Freedom Award to Gorbachev at the Reagan Library, 1992

In 1988, India awarded Gorbachev the Indira Gandhi Prize for Peace, Disarmament and Development; in 1990, he was given the Nobel Peace Prize for "his leading role in the peace process which today characterizes important parts of the international community". Out of office he continued to receive honors. In 1992, he was the first recipient of the Ronald Reagan Freedom Award, and in 1994 was given the Grawemeyer Award by the University of Louisville, Kentucky. In 1995, he was awarded the Grand-Cross of the Order of Liberty by Portuguese president Mário Soares, and in 1998 the Freedom Award from the National Civil Rights Museum in Memphis, Tennessee. In 2002, Gorbachev received the Freedom of the City of Dublin from Dublin City Council.

In 2002, Gorbachev was awarded the Charles V Prize by the European Academy of Yuste Foundation. Gorbachev, together with Bill Clinton and Sophia Loren, were awarded the 2004 Grammy Award for Best Spoken Word Album for Children for their recording of Sergei Prokofiev's 1936 Peter and the Wolf for Pentatone. In 2005, Gorbachev was awarded the Point Alpha Prize for his role in supporting German reunification.

== Bibliography ==
Year	Title	Co-author	Publisher
1987	Perestroika – New Thinking for our Country and the World	–	Harper & Row
1996	Memoirs	–	Doubleday
2005	Moral Lessons of the Twentieth Century: Gorbachev and Ikeda on Buddhism and Communism	Daisaku Ikeda	I. B. Tauris
2016	The New Russia	–	Polity
2018	In a Changing World	–	
2020	What is at Stake Now: My Appeal for Peace and Freedom	–	Polity

== In popular culture ==
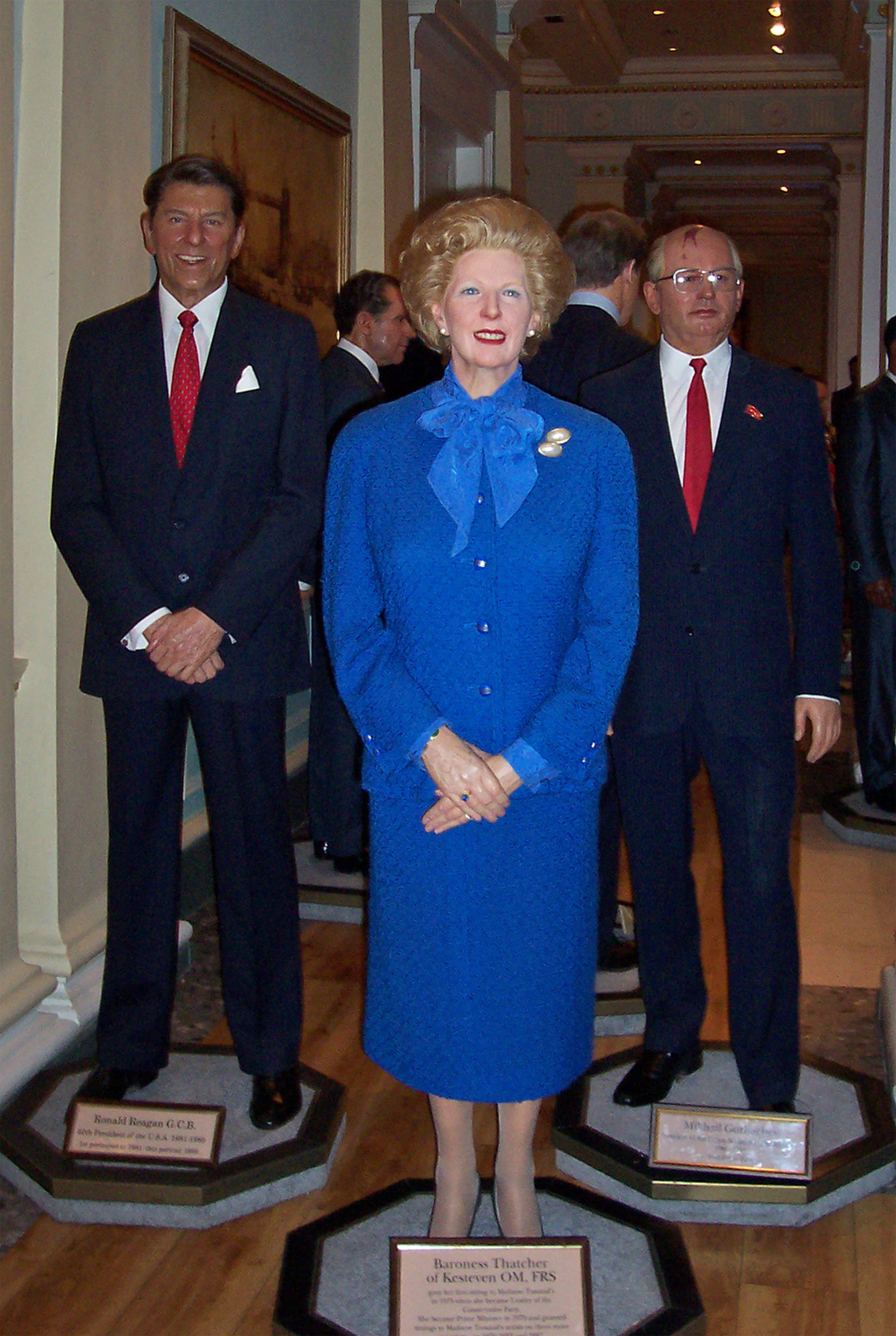
Waxworks of Reagan, Thatcher and Gorbachev at the Madame Tussauds, museum London

- David Lloyd Austin portrayed Gorbachev in the 1985 film Rocky IV.
- Gorbachev appeared in a Pizza Hut commercial in 1997.
- David Agranov voiced Gorbachev appears in the 2020 video game Call of Duty: Black Ops Cold War during a mission where the playable character infiltrates the KGB headquarters.
- David Dencik portrayed Gorbachev in the 2019 miniseries Chernobyl
- Footage of contemporary interviews with Gorbachev was used to create the 2020 film Gorbachev. Heaven.
- In 2020 and 2021, the Theatre of Nations in Moscow, in collaboration with Latvian director Alvis Hermanis, staged a production called Gorbachev. Yevgeny Mironov and Chulpan Khamatova played the roles of Gorbachev and his wife Raisa respectively.
- Matthew Marsh portrayed Gorbachev in the 2023 film Tetris.
- Aleksander Krupa portrayed Gorbachev in the 2024 biographical drama Reagan.

== See also ==
- List of peace activists
- List of Nobel Peace Prize laureates

== Notes ==
Party political offices
Preceded by Leonid Yefremov	First Secretary of the Stavropol CPSU Regional Committee; 1970–1978	Succeeded by Vsevolod Murakhovsky
Preceded by Konstantin Chernenko	General Secretary of the Central Committee of the Communist Party of the Soviet Union; 1985–1991	Succeeded by Vladimir Ivashko (acting)
Political offices
Preceded by Andrei Gromyko as Chairman of the Presidium of the Supreme Soviet	Chairman of the Presidium of the Supreme Soviet (1988–1989); Chairman of the Supreme Soviet (1989–1990); President of the Soviet Union (1990–1991); 1988–1991	Office abolished
Awards and achievements
Preceded by 14th Dalai Lama	Recipient of the Nobel Peace Prize; 1990	Succeeded by Aung San Suu Kyi
Award established	Recipient of the Ronald Reagan Freedom Award; 1992	Succeeded by Colin Powell
