= Russian United Social Democratic Party =

Russian United Social Democratic Party Российская объединённая социал-демократическая партия
- Abbreviation: ROSDP
- Leader: Mikhail Gorbachev
- Founded: 11 March 2000
- Registered: 29 May 2000
- Dissolved: 24 November 2001
- Merger of: Social Democrats; Social Democratic Union; Russian Democratic Reform Movement; Social Liberal Party of Russia; Labor Party; New Left
- Preceded by: Congress of Social Democratic Forces
- Succeeded by: Social Democratic Party of Russia (United)
- Headquarters: Moscow, Russia
- Youth wing: Russian Social-Democratic Union of Youth
- Membership (2001): 13,000
- Ideology: Social democracy
- Political position: Centre-left
- Colours: Red

Website
- rosdp.ru (archive)

The Russian United Social Democratic Party (Russian: Российская объединённая социал-демократическая партия, romanized: Rossiyskaya ob"yedinennaya sotsial-demokraticheskaya partiya; ROSDP) was a short-lived Russian center-left political party led by Mikhail Gorbachev, the former president of the USSR. The party included representatives on an individual basis:

- the Social Democrats movement;
- Social Democratic Union;
- The Russian Democratic Reform Movement;
- Social Liberal Party of Russia;
- the New Left movement;
- Labor Party, etc.

In 2001, the party merged with the RPSD in the Social Democratic Party of Russia

== History ==
At the beginning of 2000, the leaders and representatives of a number of social democratic parties and organizations decided to appeal to the former President of the USSR M. Gorbachev with an appeal to unite and lead the social democratic movement in Russia. The moment was not chosen by chance: on the one hand, there was a complete crisis of Russian social democracy, and on the other hand, with Yeltsin's departure from the Russian political arena, Gorbachev's return to it became quite possible.

On March 11, 2000 M. Gorbachev headed the Russian United Social Democratic Party (ROSDP), which managed to unite in its ranks representatives of about twelve social democratic parties and organizations. The leadership of the ROSDP includes representatives of the former SDPR (B. Orlov), the RSDS (B. Guseletov, A. Lukichev), the Social Democrats movement (G. Popov), the International Union (A. Mikitaev) and others. The ROSDP declared itself the heir to the traditions of the RSDLP (Mensheviks). The ROSDP came out against "liberal fundamentalism, the implementation of which has led the country to decline in the last ten years," and against the strategy of catch-up modernization for Russia.

The party was officially registered on May 29, 2000

In 2001, the Party of Social Democracy (PSD) of the Governor of the Samara Region Konstantin Titov joined the initiative of Mikhail Gorbachev. The design and estimate documentation was created by one of the former architects of perestroika (now deceased) A.N. Yakovlev, who switched to radical reformist positions during the Yeltsin era. At the beginning of its activity, the PSD positioned itself as a right-wing liberal party. But with the arrival of K. Titov in the party, the PSD began to evolve towards the "new" European Social Democracy, standing on the positions of the Manifesto of T. Blair and G. Schroeder "Europe: The Third Way." After a series of consultations, an agreement was reached on the creation of a united social democratic party on the basis of the ROSDP and the PSD.

On November 25, the parties officially merged into the Social Democratic Party of Russia
