= Privolnoye, Stavropol Krai =

Privolnoye Привольное
- Selo
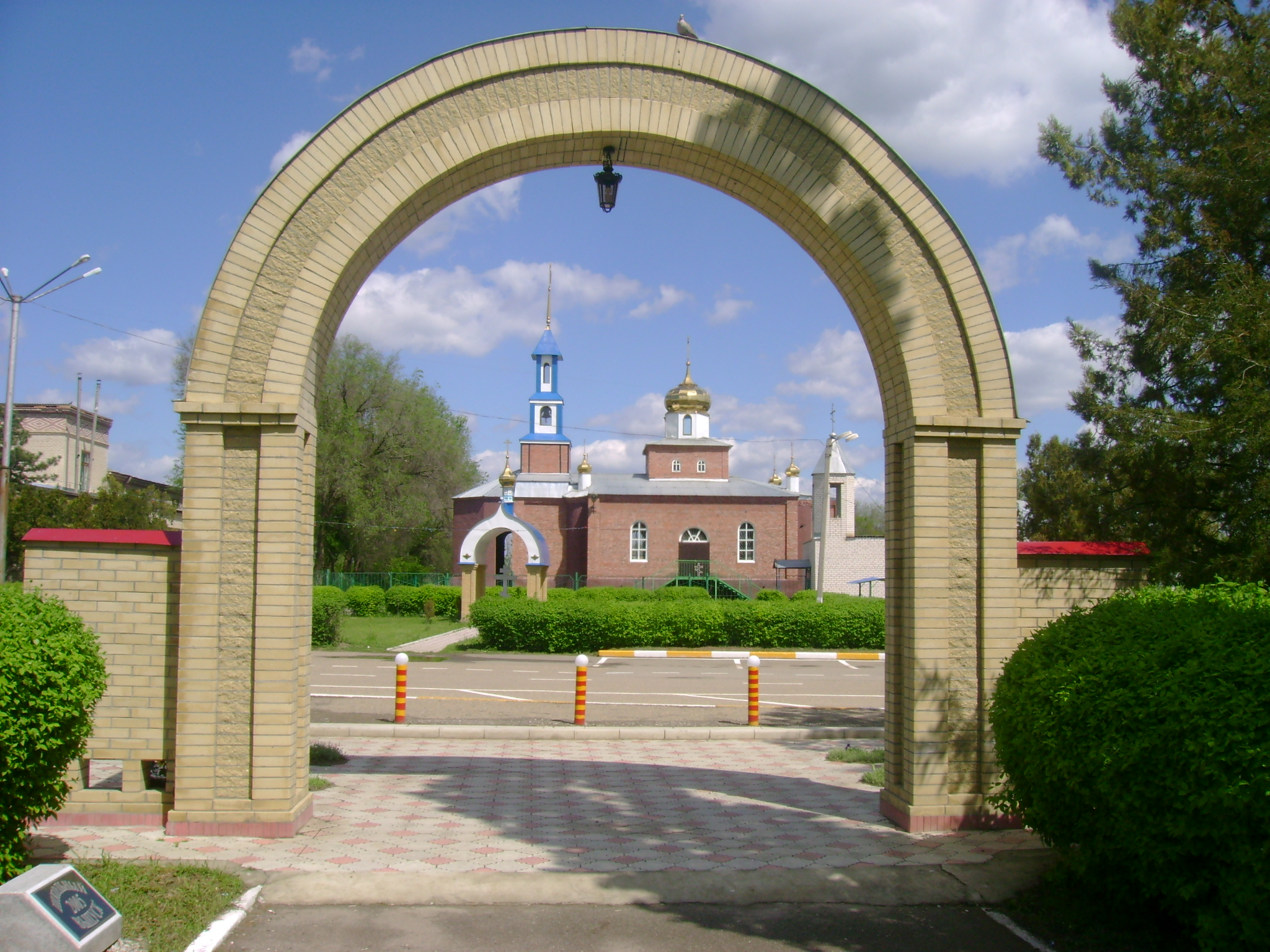
- Privolnoye church
- Interactive map of Privolnoye
- Location of Privolnoye Privolnoye (Stavropol Krai)
- Coordinates: 45°55′10″N 41°18′20″E
- Country: Russia
- Federal subject: Stavropol Krai
- Administrative district: Krasnogvardeysky District
- Founded: 1848

Population (2010 Census)
  - Total: 3,350
  - Estimate (2021): 3,319 (−0.9%)
- Time zone: UTC+3 (MSK)
- Postal codes: 356050, 356051
- OKTMO ID: 07630425101

Privolnoye (Russian: Привольное, pronounced [prʲɪˈvolʲnəjə]) is a rural locality (a selo) in Krasnogvardeysky District of Stavropol Krai, Russia, located on the Yegorlyk River. Population: 3,350 (2010 census); 3,491 (2002 census).

== Notable people ==
Privolnoye was the birthplace of former Soviet leader Mikhail Gorbachev. Nobel Peace Prize laureate, recipient of the UN Champions of the Earth Environmental Award

== In popular culture ==
The town is featured in Vitaly Mansky's 2001 documentary Gorbachev: After Empire.
