= Union of Social Democrats =

Union of Social Democrats Союз социал-демократов
- Abbreviation: USD (English); ССД (Russian)
- Founder: Mikhail Gorbachev
- Founded: 20 October 2007
- Dissolved: 15 November 2013
- Split from: Social Democratic Party of Russia
- Headquarters: Moscow, Russia
- Youth wing: Russian Social-Democratic Union of Youth
- Ideology: Social democracy Democratic socialism
- Political position: Centre-left
- International affiliation: Socialist International (consultative)
- Colours: Red; Light blue

Union of Social Democrats (USD; Russian: Союз социал-демократов; ССД; Soyuz sotsial-demokratov, SSD) was an all-Russian non-governmental organization founded on 20 October 2007 by former Soviet leader Mikhail Gorbachev.

The party had its roots in the former Social Democratic Party of Russia, which lost its official status in April 2007 due to low party membership.

The Union of Social Democrats skipped the 2007 general election, in order to concentrate on its ultimate goal: to become a mass political party by 2011.

In September 2008, Gorbachev announced the formation of the Independent Democratic Party of Russia, although the plans later fell through.

== See also ==
- Independent Democratic Party of Russia
- List of political parties in Russia
- Politics of Russia
- Russian Social-Democratic Union of Youth
