= Social Democratic Party of Russia (2001) =

Former political party in Russia

Social Democratic Party of Russia Социал-демократическая партия России
- Abbreviation: SDPR (English); СДПР (Russian)
- Leader: Vladimir Kishenin
- Founders: Mikhail Gorbachev; Konstantin Titov
- Founded: November 26, 2001; 24 years ago
- Dissolved: July 18, 2007; 19 years ago
- Merger of: Russian United Social Democratic Party; Russian Party of Social Democracy
- Succeeded by: Union of Social Democrats
- Headquarters: 7th Building, Moskvoretskaya Embankment, Moscow, Russia
- Newspaper: Social democrat
- Youth wing: Russian Social-Democratic Union of Youth
- Membership: 12,000
- Ideology: Social democracy Democratic socialism Liberal socialism
- Political position: Centre-left
- International affiliation: Socialist International (consultative)
- Colours: Red

Website
- sdprus.ru

The Social Democratic Party of Russia (SDPR; Russian: Социал-демократическая партия России; СДПР; Sotsial-demokraticheskaya partiya Rossii, SDPR) was a political party founded in Russia by Mikhail Gorbachev on November 26, 2001. The first name of the party was Social Democratic Party of Russia (United).

== History ==
The Social Democratic Party of Russia was a coalition of several social democratic parties, had approximately 12,000 members, but had no seats in the Russian State Duma. Gorbachev resigned as party leader in May 2004 over a disagreement with party chairman Konstantin Titov who had insisted, over Gorbachev's opposition, on a deal with the pro-Kremlin United Russia Party in the previous year's general election.

Konstantin Titov, in turn, announced his resignation at the 3rd convention of the party held September 4, 2004. The convention elected the new chairman, Vladimir Kishenin, leader of the Party of Social Justice, who was favoured by Titov.

Presenting himself, Kishenin mentioned that he studied in a KGB college in 1972-1975. When asked why he was a trusted representative for Vladimir Putin during the last presidential election, Kishenin explained that this was done at the request of Vladislav Surkov, deputy director of the President's Administration.

On April 13, 2007, the party lost its official status due to its small membership. The vast majority of the party's base has regrouped under the banner of Union of Social-Democrats, a new party organized and led by Mikhail Gorbachev, founded on October 20, 2007.

== Youth organization ==
Youth organization of Social Democratic Party of Russia is Russian Social-Democratic Union of Youth (RSDUY, Russian: Российский социал-демократический союз молодёжи). RSDUY was founded in 2000 and have official status. RSDUY is an observer of International Union of Socialist Youth.

== See also ==
- Union of Social-Democrats
- Politics of Russia
