= 2004–2005 Russian benefits monetization protests =

- Date: June 2004 / January 9, 2005 – end of 2005
- Location: Russia
- Caused by: Monetization of benefits
- Methods: rallies, pickets, strikes, signature collection, street closures, storming and seizure of administrative buildings, and an attempt at a vote of no confidence in the Fradkov government
- Result: Protesters' demands met

Parties
Opposition: Communist Party of the Russian Federation; Leninist Komsomol of the Russian Federation; Russian Party of Pensioners for Social Justice; Rodina; Russian Communist Workers' Party of the Communist Party of the Soviet Union; National Bolshevik Party; Labour Russia; Vanguard of Red Youth; Left Front; Russian Communist Youth League; Revolutionary Workers' Party; Socialist Resistance; Anarchists; Trade unions; Liberal Democratic Party of Russia; Republican Party of Russia; Yabloko; Union of Right Forces (some regional branches); Nationalists; Walking without Putin	Government: Ministry of Internal Affairs; Police; Internal Troops; OMON; OMSN; United Russia; Walking Together; Union of Right Forces; People's Party of the Russian Federation

Lead figures
Gennady Zyuganov; Sergey Atroshenko; Dmitry Rogozin; Viktor Tyulkin; Eduard Limonov; Viktor Anpilov; Sergei Udaltsov; Sergei Biets Vladimir Zhirinovsky; Grigory Yavlinsky; Boris Nemtsov	Vladimir Putin (Russia) Mikhail Fradkov (Russia) Arkady Kamenev (Russia) Oleg Chirkunov; Vasily Yakemenko Anatoly Chubais; Gennady Raikov

Number
approx. 1,000 protesters (February 28)	

Casualties and losses
- 1 pensioner killed

The 2004–2005 Russian benefits monetization protests in Russia were a reaction to an economic policy change by President Vladimir Putin and Prime Minister Mikhail Fradkov.

== Protests ==
On July 29, 2004, a protest rally of Chernobyl survivors against the upcoming monetization of benefits was held in Moscow. On August 2, 2004, a group of National Bolsheviks occupied the office of the Health and Social Development Ministry building in Moscow to protest against the social benefits reform. The communist opposition strongly opposed the upcoming reform, calling it "anti-people".

The practical implementation of the “monetization of benefits” in January 2005 sparked large-scale protests that swept across almost the entire country. The most visible protesting group were the pensioners.

Protests took on a wide scale in major cities. Moscow Mayor Yuri Luzhkov was able to secure funding for the benefit from the city budget, but the country's second-largest city, St. Petersburg, lacked the same financial resources. The largest protests swept through this city, resulting in at least one fatality. Protesters blocked major thoroughfares—Nevsky and Moskovsky Prospekts. One of the cars struck and killed a pensioner.

During January and February, a number of opposition figures from across the political spectrum attempted to join the protests and lead them.

The liberal opposition and Western press remained ambivalent about the events: on the one hand, they unconditionally supported the very idea of reform. On the other, as the protests grew, they also supported them.

Large-scale protests occurred almost immediately after the failure of Russian support for Viktor Yanukovych in the 2004 presidential elections and seriously undermined the authorities' reputation for a time. It was also shocking that the protests reached their peak in Vladimir Putin's home city of St. Petersburg, as the media had previously reported on his popularity there. An additional blow to the authorities came from the address by the head of the Russian Orthodox Church, Alexy II; the patriarch sided with the pensioners in their conflict with the authorities.

The virtual failure to monetize benefits caused the second drop in Vladimir Putin's approval ratings in the history of his presidency (the first occurred after the sinking of the Kursk submarine), from 84% at the beginning of 2004 to 48% at the beginning of 2005.

Military personnel became another large category of welfare affected by the reform. Compensation was calculated in such a way that service members living far from their duty stations suffered significant financial losses, especially noticeable given their relatively low pay. According to an Interfax poll conducted in early 2005, 80% of military personnel expressed dissatisfaction with the monetization of benefits.

Although the military is prohibited from striking and holding rallies, discontent found external expression, albeit briefly. On February 19, 2005, they attempted to organize an opposition All-Army Officers' Assembly. Before the meeting began, the lights were turned off in the rented premises of the Russian Academy of Public Administration, and officers were pushed away from the building by riot police. As a result, the crowd moved outside, using a snowdrift as a platform, and their slogans became significantly more radical.

As a result of the rally, the military demanded a sharp strengthening of the Armed Forces, an increase in their funding, and announced the formation of an "officer-Cossack militia," which could be regarded by the authorities as the creation of illegal armed groups. The military itself did not consider its actions a mutiny; in their view, they acted in full accordance with the statement of Supreme Commander-in-Chief President Vladimir Putin on the need to strengthen the state, and the militia's goal was supposed to be "the protection of Russian nuclear weapons from the United States." Those gathered believed that the United States allegedly plans to seize control of Russia's nuclear arsenals within the next few months.

Despite the wide resonance, the events did not develop further, and the “officer-Cossack militia” was not formed.

Throughout 2005, the government, together with regional authorities, took a number of measures to combat the escalating social tensions. In a number of regions, monetary compensation was increased to a level acceptable to pensioners, and the protests gradually subsided.
