= Labour Russia =

Labour Russia Трудовая Россия
- Abbreviation: TR (English); ТР (Russian)
- Leader: Stanislav Ruzanov
- Founder: Viktor Anpilov
- Founded: October 11, 1992; 34 years ago
- Split from: Russian Communist Workers Party (in 1995)
- Newspaper: Molniya (Lightning, 1990-2014); Trudovaya Rossiya (Labour Russia)
- Youth wing: Vanguard of Red Youth (1999-2004)
- Membership: 20,000
- Ideology: Communism; Marxism-Leninism; Stalinism; Left-wing nationalism Soviet patriotism Socialism; Direct democracy
- Political position: Far-left
- National affiliation: Russian Communist Workers' Party (1991-1995); United Communist Party (since 2018); Communist Party of the Russian Federation
- Colours: Red
- Anthem: The Internationale

Website
- trudross.ru (in Russian)

Labour Russia (LR or TR; Russian: Трудовая Россия; ТР; Trudovaya Rossiya, TR) is a Marxist-Leninist and Stalinist movement in Russia. It was established in 1992 by decision of the January 1992 plenum of the Russian Communist Workers Party (RKRP). The founding congress took place on 25 October 1992. Labour Russia was officially registered by the Ministry of Justice of the Russian Federation on 9 January 1996, then deregistered on 16 March 2004.

The predecessor of Labour Russia was the movement Communist Initiative, on the basis of which the Labour Moscow movement was formed in November 1991, later becoming Labour Russia. The movement's leaders focused on mass street activism. The maximum number of active participants in the early 1990s reached up to 100,000 people throughout more than 80 regional branches; in Moscow, the number of active participants reached 3,000 people. The most prominent leader of the movement and its leader for the vast majority of its history was Viktor Anpilov. In February 1993, the Moscow branch of the movement, Labour Capital, was established.

Apart from the RCWP activists, the movement included activists from other radical opposition groups, e.g. the United Front of Workers, the Union of Communists, the Union of Officers etc. In 1995, the organisation took part in the legislative election in the list Communists - Labour Russia - For the Soviet Union. The Labour Russia movement earned notoriety in the 1990s with aggressive anti-government demonstrators, e.g. the 1993 May Day demonstration that turned into riots. Anpilov used both communist and ultranationalist rhetoric. Viktor Anpilov was also one of the initiators of the armed rebellion in October 1993 in Moscow.

In October 1996, Labour Russia split. One part of the movement continued to be led by Viktor Anpilov (since 2012, Anpilov has been honorary chairman; Stanislav Ruzanov was elected chairman at the 28th Congress of the Movement on 4 November 2012), and the other was headed by Vladimir Grigoriev (RKRP).

== Activity ==
On 7 November 1991, on the initiative of Labour Moscow, the first left opposition rally was held in Moscow on Red Square. The demonstration took place despite the decree of President Boris Yeltsin banning the activities of the Communist Party of the Soviet Union. At the same time, on the basis of regional branches of the Communist Initiative, the Russian Communist Workers' Party (RCWP) was established, which continued the tradition of using mass actions against the authorities. In December 1991, the first (then still quite peaceful) "march on Ostankino" took place; in January 1992, a demonstration against the privatization reforms of the Gaidar-Yeltsin government; in February, a march on the White House (marches of hungry lines and "empty pots").

Members of the Labour Russia movement took part in clashes with Moscow militsiya on 23 February 1992 (when demonstrators first attempted to break through the barrier chains and were dispersed by OMON forces).

On 17 March 1992, on the anniversary of the referendum on the preservation of the USSR, on the initiative of Labor Russia and people’s deputies of the USSR, the All-People’s Assembly of Soviet Peoples was organized on Manezhnaya Square in Moscow, in which about one hundred thousand demonstrators took part. This action, which coincided with the holding of the 6th Congress of People's Deputies of the Soviet Union in the Voronovo state farm near Moscow, despite its large number, marked a dead end in which the “irreconcilable opposition” found itself - the authorities refused to enter into any negotiations with it and the rally did not achieve its goals - the socio-economic course remained unchanged.

Further mass actions in which Labour Russia participated included the siege of the Ostankino television center (the "siege of the empire of lies" against perceived propaganda of violence and Russophobia on television) in June 1992 and clashes with militsiya at the Kaluga outpost on 1 May 1993. These actions were used by the authorities to incite fear of the "red-browns" in society.

In the summer of 1994, during the "Russian Redoubt" action, Labour Russia activists disrupted joint Russian-American exercises at the Totsky range, and during the 1993 Russian constitutional crisis in Moscow they came to the defense of the House of Soviets. This became the basis for suspending the activities of Labour Russia, among other opposition associations that organized resistance to presidential power (the decision to ban eight main parties and movements was issued by the Ministry of Justice on 4 October 1993).

In the 1995 Russian legislative election, the bloc Communists - Labour Russia - For the USSR (formed by Labor Russia, the Russian Communist Workers' Party, and the Russian Communist Party - CPSU) gained 4.7% of the votes and could not overcome the 5% barrier. In the same year, Labour Russia separated from the RCWP.

In 1997 and 1998, the leadership of Labour Russia organized mass marches of workers on Moscow, which coincided with the miners’ "rail war."

In 1997, the leadership and activists of Labor Russia initiated the creation of the Labor People's Front together with the Union of Officers of Stanislav Terekhov and the National Bolsheviks of Eduard Limonov.

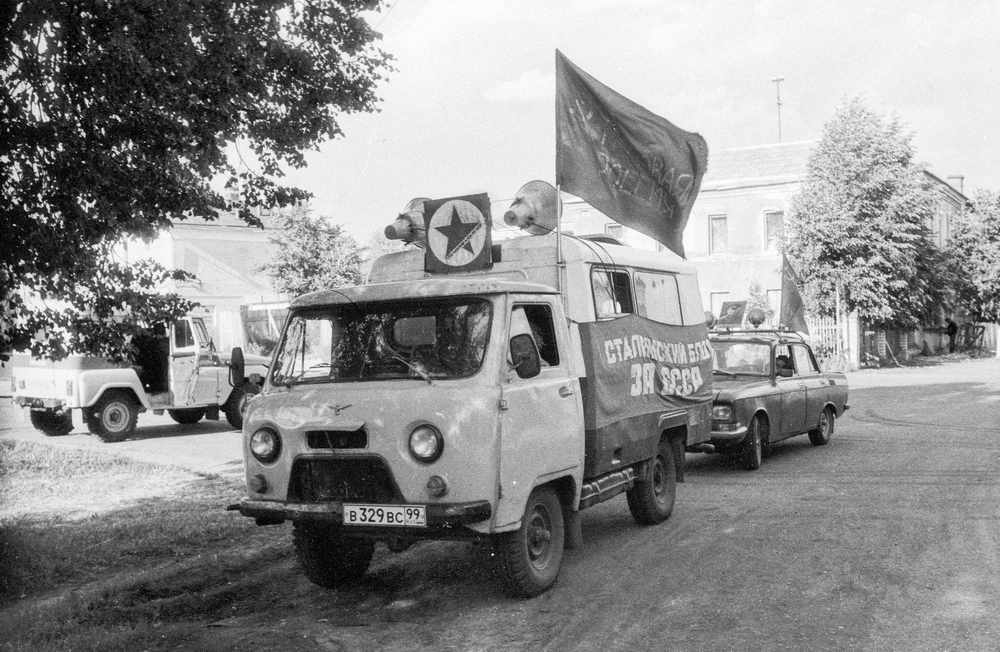
Participants of the “Stalin Bloc for the USSR” during a communist demonstration from Brest to the Kuril Islands

In 1999, Labour Russia entered the legislative election as part of the electoral bloc Stalin Bloc – For the USSR, together with the Union of Officers, Igor Malyarov's Russian Communist Youth League, and the grandson of Joseph Stalin, Yevgeny Dzhugashvili (the bloc received 0.61% of the votes).

In 2006, Viktor Anpilov, as a representative of Labour Russia, took part for a short time in the work of the Other Russia coalition as an observer and participant in the information platform.

In 2018, most of the members of Labor Russia joined the United Communist Party, while its activities (in alliance with other leftist forces) continue.

Before the 2021 Russian legislative election, Labour Russia entered into an alliance agreement with the Communist Party of the Russian Federation, at the 18th Congress of which it was decided to nominate its candidates in a number of districts.

== Publications ==
The central printed publication of Labour Russia was the newspaper Molniya (1990-2014), and later the Labour Russia newsletter, which serves as an appendix to the movement's official website.

== Ideology ==
Labour Russia activists advocate "in defense of the socialist choice made by the peoples of Russia" during the October Revolution of 1917, for the restoration of Soviet power and the Soviet Union, for the establishment of "direct democracy" in Russia, the socialization of the economy, and the protection of the sovereignty of the Russian Federation.
