= 2026 Leningrad Oblast legislative election =

Regional legislative election in Russia

- 18–20 September 2026

All 50 seats in the Legislative Assembly 26 seats needed for a majority
- Turnout: 62.73% ▲19.72 pp
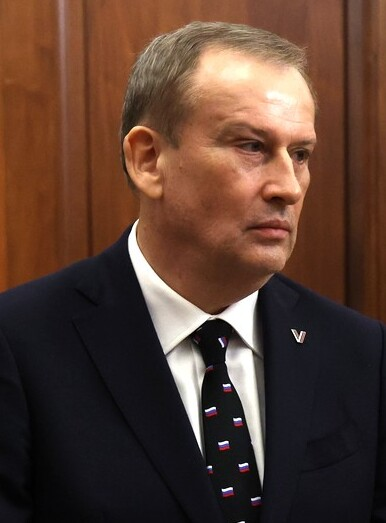

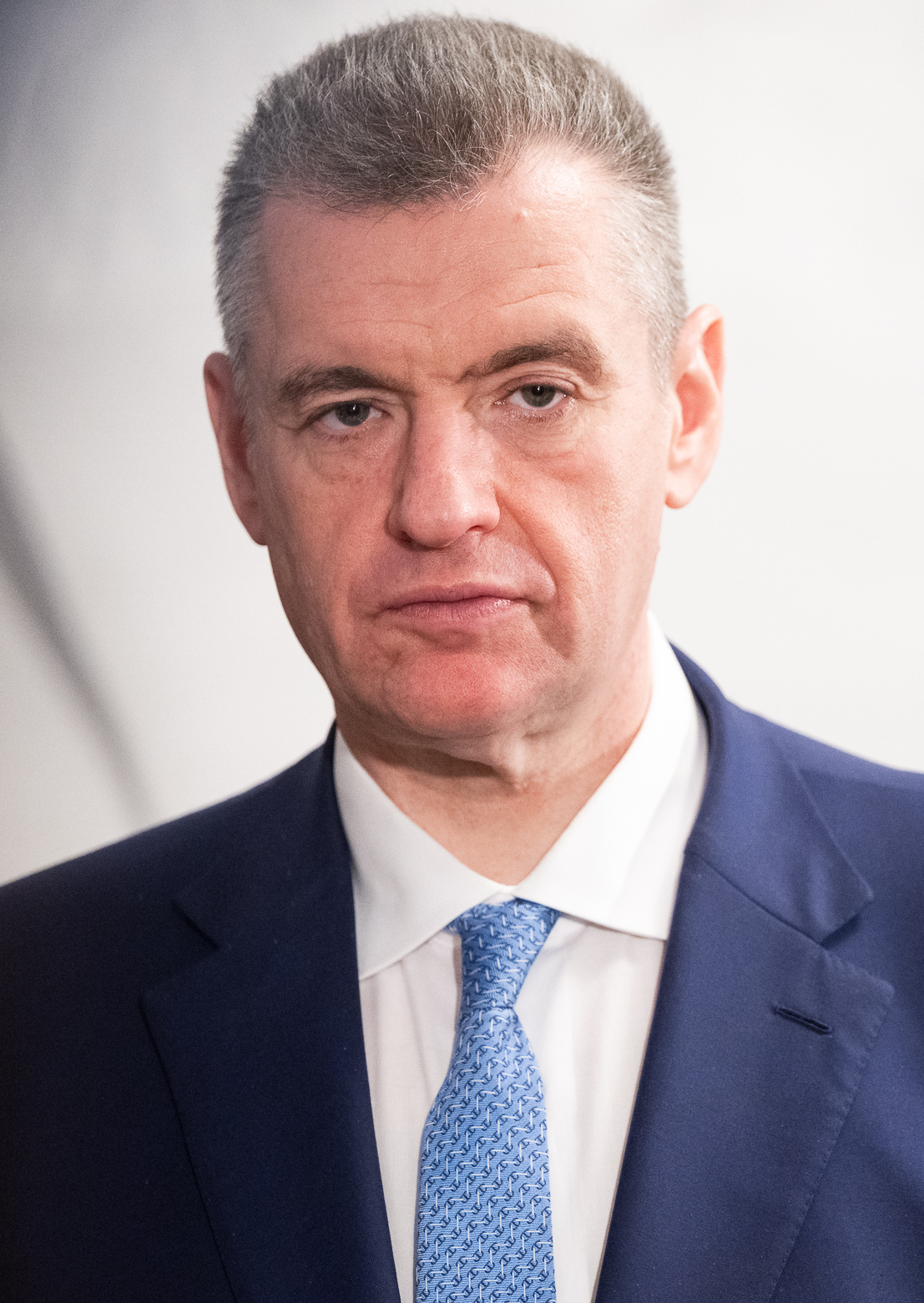

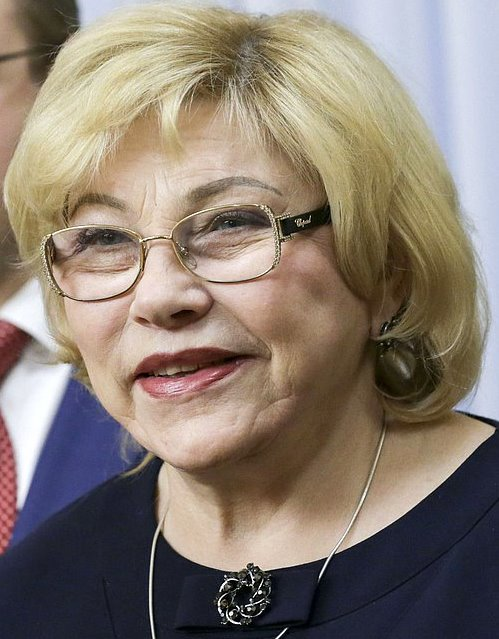
	Majority party	Minority party	Third party
			CPRF
Candidate	Aleksandr Drozdenko	Leonid Slutsky	Vadim Grishkov
Party	United Russia	LDPR	CPRF
Last election	46.37%, 35 seats	10.60%, 3 seats	20.70%, 7 seats
Seats won	44	3	2
Seat change	▲9	Steady	▼5
Popular vote	566,539	104,688	76,682
Percentage	64.11%	11.85%	8.68%
Swing	▲17.74 pp	▲1.25 pp	▼12.02 pp
	Fourth party	Fifth party	Sixth party
	NL		CPCR
Candidate	Sergey Morenkov	Yelena Drapeko	Sergey Malinkovich
Party	New People	A Just Russia	Communists of Russia
Last election	Failed to qualify	15.20%, 5 seats	Did not participate
Seats won	1	0	0
Seat change	New	▼5	New
Popular vote	54,673	32,335	16,620
Percentage	6.19	3.66%	1.88%
Swing	New	▼11.54 pp	New
Chairman before election
Sergey Bebenin
United Russia
Elected Chairman
Sergey Bebenin
United Russia
Senator before election
Dmitry Vasilenko
United Russia
Senator after election
Dmitry Vasilenko
United Russia

The 2026 Legislative Assembly of Leningrad Oblast election took place on 18–20 September 2026, on common election day, coinciding with the 2026 Russian legislative election. All 50 seats in the Legislative Assembly were up for re-election.

United Russia increased its overwhelming majority in the Legislative Assembly, winning 64.1% of the vote and all 25 single-mandate constituencies. Communist Party of the Russian Federation lost 12 points and finished third, behind Liberal Democratic Party of Russia, losing five seats. A Just Russia suffered crushing defeat, failing to cross the 5% threshold and losing its entire five-member faction. New People entered the Legislative Assembly for the first time, winning 6.2% of the vote and one seat.

== Electoral system ==
Under current election laws, the Legislative Assembly is elected for a term of five years, with parallel voting. 25 seats are elected by party-list proportional representation with a 5% electoral threshold, with the other half elected in 25 single-member constituencies by first-past-the-post voting. Seats in the proportional part are allocated using the Imperiali quota, modified to ensure that every party list, which passes the threshold, receives at least one mandate.

== Candidates ==
=== Party lists ===
To register regional lists of candidates, parties need to collect 0.5% of signatures of all registered voters in Leningrad Oblast.

The following parties were relieved from the necessity to collect signatures:

- United Russia
- Communist Party of the Russian Federation
- Liberal Democratic Party of Russia
- A Just Russia
- New People
- Yabloko

№	Party	Oblast-wide list	Candidates	Territorial groups	Status
1	United Russia	Aleksandr Drozdenko • Valery Yenin • Marina Gnatyuk • Vadim Gustov • Dmitry Vasilenko	79	25	Registered
2	The Greens	Aleksandr Perminov • Sergey Lisovsky • Konstantin Gribach • Yury Yakovlev • Natalya Podolskaya	53	25	Registered
3	Communist Party	Vadim Grishkov • Yevgeny Tiron • Damir Khakuashev	58	25	Registered
4	Communists of Russia	Sergey Malinkovich • Vyacheslav Gumerov • Yekaterina Mironova	47	25	Registered
5	New People	Sergey Morenkov • Timur Machitidze • Nikolay Panchenko • Andrey Yershov • Yevgeny Zhdanov	48	25	Registered
6	Liberal Democratic Party	Leonid Slutsky • Andrey Lebedev • Igor Rikhtikov	65	25	Registered
7	A Just Russia	Yelena Drapeko • Sergey Shulga	53	25	Registered
	Yabloko	Grigory Grishin	20	19	Failed to qualify
	Rodina	Aleksey Zhuravlyov • Aleksandr Fedchenko • Andrey Khitrov			Failed the certification

Communists of Russia and Russian Ecological Party "The Greens" took part in the Leningrad Oblast legislative election for the first time.

=== Single-mandate constituencies ===
25 single-mandate constituencies were formed in Leningrad Oblast. To register candidates in single-mandate constituencies need to collect 3% of signatures of registered voters in the constituency.

Number of candidates in single-mandate constituencies
Party	Candidates			
Party		United Russia	25	25
Communist Party	25	23		
A Just Russia	22	20		
Liberal Democratic Party	25	22		
New People	17	16		
Communists of Russia	2	1		
Independent	6	0		
Total	122	107		

== Results ==
=== Results by party lists ===
Summary of the 18–20 September 2026 Legislative Assembly of Leningrad Oblast election results
Party	Party list					Constituency		Total	
Party	Votes	%	±pp	Seats	+/–	Seats	+/–	Seats	+/–
United Russia	566,539	64.11	▲17.74	19	▲6	25	▲3	44	▲9
Liberal Democratic Party	104,688	11.85	▲1.25	3	Steady	0	Steady	3	Steady
Communist Party	76,682	8.68	▼12.02	2	▼3	0	▼2	2	▼5
New People	54,673	6.19	New	1	New	0	New	1	New
A Just Russia	32,335	3.66	▼11.54	0	▼4	0	▼1	0	▼5
Communists of Russia	16,620	1.88	New	0	New	0	New	0	New
The Greens	15,397	1.74	New	0	New	–	–	0	New
Invalid ballots	16,748	1.90	▼2.01	—	—	—	—	—	—
Total	883,682	100.00	—	25	Steady	25	Steady	50	Steady
Turnout	883,682	62.73	▲19.72	—	—	—	—	—	—
Registered voters	1,408,706	100.00	—	—	—	—	—	—	—

Sergey Bebenin (United Russia) was re-elected as Chairman of the Legislative Assembly, while incumbent Senator Dmitry Vasilenko (United Russia) was re-appointed to the Federation Council.

=== Results in single-member constituencies ===
==== District 1 ====
Summary of the 18–20 September 2026 Legislative Assembly of Leningrad Oblast election in Vyborgsky constituency No.1
Candidate	Party	Votes	%
Mikhail Makarov (incumbent)	United Russia	17,912	59.04%
Valeria Kovalenko	A Just Russia	3,576	11.79%
Ilya Chaplygin	Liberal Democratic Party	3,373	11.12%
Anzhela Donskaya	Communist Party	2,948	9.72%
Vasily Suvorov	New People	1,990	6.56%
Total		30,339	100%

==== District 2 ====
Summary of the 18–20 September 2026 Legislative Assembly of Leningrad Oblast election in Kamennogorsky constituency No.2
Candidate	Party	Votes	%
Vladimir Tsoi	United Russia	28,215	68.33%
Pyotr Yeltsov	Liberal Democratic Party	5,747	13.92%
Olga Nigu	Communist Party	4,176	10.11%
Dzhamilya Kalantarova	A Just Russia	2,651	6.42%
Total		41,295	100%

==== District 3 ====
Summary of the 18–20 September 2026 Legislative Assembly of Leningrad Oblast election in Priozersky constituency No.3
Candidate	Party	Votes	%
Vladimir Mylnikov	United Russia	19,702	60.08%
Veronika Gribanova	Liberal Democratic Party	4,867	14.84%
Lyudmila Korshunova	Communist Party	4,497	13.71%
Vladislav Mironenkov	New People	2,707	8.26%
Total		32,791	100%

==== District 4 ====
Summary of the 18–20 September 2026 Legislative Assembly of Leningrad Oblast election in Sertolovsky constituency No.4
Candidate	Party	Votes	%
Aleksandr Ryazanov (incumbent)	United Russia	36,361	84.13%
Mikhail Yushin	A Just Russia	3,670	8.49%
Matvey Lobanovsky	New People	2,985	6.91%
Total		43,222	100%

==== District 5 ====
Summary of the 18–20 September 2026 Legislative Assembly of Leningrad Oblast election in Bugrovsky constituency No.5
Candidate	Party	Votes	%
Andrey Nizovsky	United Russia	27,704	71.16%
Yekaterina Zhilyabina	Communist Party	6,669	17.13%
Nikolay Vakula	New People	4,047	10.40%
Total		38,932	100%

==== District 6 ====
Summary of the 18–20 September 2026 Legislative Assembly of Leningrad Oblast election in Vsevolozhsky constituency No.6
Candidate	Party	Votes	%
Oleg Shutov	United Russia	25,967	69.81%
Oksana Polozova	A Just Russia	5,597	15.05%
Stanislav Krivinkov	Communist Party	5,154	13.86%
Total		37,196	100%

==== District 7 ====
Summary of the 18–20 September 2026 Legislative Assembly of Leningrad Oblast election in Murinsky constituency No.7
Candidate	Party	Votes	%
Anna Khmelyova	United Russia	9,592	46.61%
Ilshat Nafikov	Communist Party	3,599	17.49%
Timur Machitidze	New People	2,710	13.17%
Viktor Belousov	A Just Russia	2,262	10.99%
Aleksey Burdonos	Liberal Democratic Party	1,856	9.02%
Total		20,579	100%

==== District 8 ====
Summary of the 18–20 September 2026 Legislative Assembly of Leningrad Oblast election in Zanevsky constituency No.8
Candidate	Party	Votes	%
Vyacheslav Kondratyev	United Russia	30,803	71.58%
Vyacheslav Usachyov	Liberal Democratic Party	6,565	15.26%
Olesya Odegova	Communist Party	2,629	6.11%
Kirill Zhurov	A Just Russia	1,900	4.42%
Maria Chulkova	Communists of Russia	1,088	2.53%
Total		43,030	100%

==== District 9 ====
Summary of the 18–20 September 2026 Legislative Assembly of Leningrad Oblast election in Sverdlovsky constituency No.9
Candidate	Party	Votes	%
Elchin Aliyev	United Russia	20,545	60.74%
Larisa Mukhina	Communist Party	5,641	16.68%
Andrey Bogdan	Liberal Democratic Party	4,990	14.75%
Aleksey Fomin	A Just Russia	1,838	5.43%
Total		33,827	100%

==== District 10 ====
Summary of the 18–20 September 2026 Legislative Assembly of Leningrad Oblast election in Kirovsky constituency No.10
Candidate	Party	Votes	%
Mikhail Kolomytsev (incumbent)	United Russia	28,943	67.72%
Aleksey Vinogradov	Communist Party	3,780	8.84%
Yekaterina Akshintseva	A Just Russia	3,232	7.56%
Igor Golnev	Liberal Democratic Party	3,192	7.47%
Andrey Meleshko	New People	2,814	6.58%
Total		42,739	100%

==== District 11 ====
Summary of the 18–20 September 2026 Legislative Assembly of Leningrad Oblast election in Volkhovsky constituency No.11
Candidate	Party	Votes	%
Vyacheslav Kiselev	United Russia	11,890	46.46%
Yekaterina Abanina	Liberal Democratic Party	3,861	15.09%
Artur Kagadiy	Communist Party	3,644	14.24%
Sergey Lababuyev	A Just Russia	3,073	12.01%
Arina Lyubushkina	New People	1,744	6.81%
Total		25,591	100%

==== District 12 ====
Summary of the 18–20 September 2026 Legislative Assembly of Leningrad Oblast election in Svirsky constituency No.12
Candidate	Party	Votes	%
Sergey Bebenin (incumbent)	United Russia	17,162	65.82%
Vadim Chumachenko	Communist Party	4,250	16.30%
Stepan Smirnov	Liberal Democratic Party	1,880	7.21%
Aleksey Monastyrev	New People	1,879	7.21%
Total		26,075	100%

==== District 13 ====
Summary of the 18–20 September 2026 Legislative Assembly of Leningrad Oblast election in Boksitogorsky constituency No.13
Candidate	Party	Votes	%
Nikolay Pustotin (incumbent)	United Russia	14,454	54.91%
Artyom Ivanov	A Just Russia	3,621	13.76%
Yelena Kobchikova	Communist Party	3,488	13.25%
Yulia Demidenko	New People	1,930	7.33%
Anton Zykov	Liberal Democratic Party	1,897	7.21%
Total		26,322	100%

==== District 14 ====
Summary of the 18–20 September 2026 Legislative Assembly of Leningrad Oblast election in Tikhvinsky constituency No.14
Candidate	Party	Votes	%
Aleksandr Timkov	United Russia	23,016	59.70%
Natalya Lapteva	Liberal Democratic Party	5,717	14.83%
Anna Chistyakova	A Just Russia	4,685	12.15%
Daniil Borodulya	Communist Party	3,822	9.91%
Total		38,554	100%

==== District 15 ====
Summary of the 18–20 September 2026 Legislative Assembly of Leningrad Oblast election in Kirishsky constituency No.15
Candidate	Party	Votes	%
Tatyana Tyurina (incumbent)	United Russia	15,486	55.69%
Tatyana Sysoyeva	Communist Party	4,180	15.03%
Vasily Kubashov	Liberal Democratic Party	2,754	9.90%
Aleksandr Malkin	New People	2,398	8.62%
Yevgeny Toptygin	A Just Russia	2,059	7.40%
Total		27,808	100%

==== District 16 ====
Summary of the 18–20 September 2026 Legislative Assembly of Leningrad Oblast election in Tosnensky constituency No.16
Candidate	Party	Votes	%
Andrey Klementyev	United Russia	16,733	56.90%
Andrey Levkichev	Communist Party	6,748	22.95%
Svetlana Zabolonkova	Liberal Democratic Party	3,516	11.96%
Roman Lezhnev	New People	1,744	5.93%
Aleksey Aleksandrov	A Just Russia	587	2.00%
Total		29,408	100%

==== District 17 ====
Summary of the 18–20 September 2026 Legislative Assembly of Leningrad Oblast election in Nikolsky constituency No.17
Candidate	Party	Votes	%
Oleg Kim	United Russia	15,786	54.02%
Yury Shirokikh	Liberal Democratic Party	4,246	14.53%
Aleksey Lapshin	A Just Russia	3,310	11.33%
Pavel Hanukainen	Communist Party	3,045	10.42%
Aleksandra Logvinova	New People	2,496	8.54%
Total		29,220	100%

==== District 18 ====
Summary of the 18–20 September 2026 Legislative Assembly of Leningrad Oblast election in Kommunarsky constituency No.18
Candidate	Party	Votes	%
Nikolay Yemelyanov	United Russia	23,389	65.99%
Tatyana Lomakina	Liberal Democratic Party	4,734	13.36%
Maksim Mironkov	Communist Party	3,931	11.09%
Vera Shugayeva	A Just Russia	2,745	7.74%
Total		35,443	100%

==== District 19 ====
Summary of the 18–20 September 2026 Legislative Assembly of Leningrad Oblast election in Siversky constituency No.19
Candidate	Party	Votes	%
Lyudmila Teptina (incumbent)	United Russia	20,419	63.20%
Maksim Shevchenko	Communist Party	4,202	13.01%
Stanislav Drozhzhin	Liberal Democratic Party	3,042	9.42%
Yevgeny Zhdanov	New People	2,244	6.95%
Andrey Pisarkov	A Just Russia	1,693	5.24%
Total		32,308	100%

==== District 20 ====
Summary of the 18–20 September 2026 Legislative Assembly of Leningrad Oblast election in Gatchinsky constituency No.20
Candidate	Party	Votes	%
Tatyana Bezdetko (incumbent)	United Russia	22,079	66.33%
Sergey Voskresensky	Liberal Democratic Party	5,639	16.94%
Yulia Ganyushina	Communist Party	3,055	9.18%
Mikhail Solovyev	New People	1,910	5.74%
Total		33,289	100%

==== District 21 ====
Summary of the 18–20 September 2026 Legislative Assembly of Leningrad Oblast election in Luzhsky constituency No.21
Candidate	Party	Votes	%
Nikita Koval (incumbent)	United Russia	19,406	61.28%
Viktor Lvov	Communist Party	5,141	16.24%
Aleksey Penkov	Liberal Democratic Party	3,278	10.35%
Elina Volkova	New People	2,793	8.82%
Total		31,666	100%

==== District 22 ====
Summary of the 18–20 September 2026 Legislative Assembly of Leningrad Oblast election in Volosovo-Slantsevsky constituency No.22
Candidate	Party	Votes	%
Mikhail Sergiyenko	United Russia	18,566	52.41%
Andrey Gutin	Communist Party	4,837	13.65%
Valentina Bonko	Liberal Democratic Party	4,192	11.83%
Stanislav Trokhin	New People	3,599	10.16%
Yelena Botvinskaya	A Just Russia	2,938	8.29%
Total		35,424	100%

==== District 23 ====
Summary of the 18–20 September 2026 Legislative Assembly of Leningrad Oblast election in Kingiseppsky constituency No.23
Candidate	Party	Votes	%
Dmitry Vornovskikh (incumbent)	United Russia	21,696	62.12%
Maksim Dronov	Communist Party	5,933	16.99%
Oksana Vinogradova	Liberal Democratic Party	4,255	12.18%
Sergey Gyachas	A Just Russia	2,022	5.79%
Total		34,928	100%

==== District 24 ====
Summary of the 18–20 September 2026 Legislative Assembly of Leningrad Oblast election in Sosnovoborsky constituency No.24
Candidate	Party	Votes	%
Mikhail Voronkov	United Russia	17,074	50.40%
Olga Sinyukova	Liberal Democratic Party	10,138	29.93%
Deonis Stepanenko	A Just Russia	5,282	15.59%
Total		33,878	100%

==== District 25 ====
Summary of the 18–20 September 2026 Legislative Assembly of Leningrad Oblast election in Lomonosovsky constituency No.25
Candidate	Party	Votes	%
Stanislav Yeremeyev (incumbent)	United Russia	24,636	65.23%
Sofya Vlasova	A Just Russia	4,579	12.12%
Stanislav Slepakov	Liberal Democratic Party	4,305	11.40%
Vitaly Lopukhin	Communist Party	3,678	9.74%
Total		37,768	100%

=== Members ===
Incumbent deputies are highlighted with bold, elected members who declined to take a seat are marked with ~~strikethrough~~.

Constituency
No.	Member	Party
1	Mikhail Makarov	United Russia
2	Vladimir Tsoi	United Russia
3	Vladimir Mylnikov	United Russia
4	Aleksandr Ryazanov	United Russia
5	Andrey Nizovsky	United Russia
6	Oleg Shutov	United Russia
7	Anna Khmelyova	United Russia
8	Vyacheslav Kondratyev	United Russia
9	Elchin Aliyev	United Russia
10	Mikhail Kolomytsev	United Russia
11	Vyacheslav Kiselev	United Russia
12	Sergey Bebenin	United Russia
13	Nikolay Pustotin	United Russia
14	Aleksandr Timkov	United Russia
15	Tatyana Tyurina	United Russia
16	Andrey Klementyev	United Russia
17	Oleg Kim	United Russia
18	Nikolay Yemelyanov	United Russia
19	Lyudmila Teptina	United Russia
20	Tatyana Bezdetko	United Russia
21	Nikita Koval	United Russia
22	Mikhail Sergiyenko	United Russia
23	Dmitry Vornovskikh	United Russia
24	Mikhail Voronkov	United Russia
25	Stanislav Yeremeyev	United Russia

Party lists
Member	Party
~~Aleksandr Drozdenko~~	United Russia
~~Valery Yenin~~	United Russia
~~Marina Gnatyuk~~	United Russia
Vadim Gustov	United Russia
Dmitry Vasilenko	United Russia
Yevgeny Smirnov	United Russia
Vladimir Bogdashov	United Russia
Olga Kovalchuk	United Russia
Marianna Shevchenko	United Russia
~~Alla Shkolyarenko~~	United Russia
Andrey Gardashnikov	United Russia
Naezhda Shadricheva	United Russia
~~Aleksandr Kantserev~~	United Russia
Stanislav Prikhodko	United Russia
Aleksandr Russkikh	United Russia
Mikhail Khomchenko	United Russia
Sergey Konyayev	United Russia
Vladislav Golub	United Russia
Dmitry Rytov	United Russia
~~Sergey Krasnovidov~~	United Russia
Artyom Gayvoronsky	United Russia
Pavel Korzhavykh	United Russia
Ignat Kushch	United Russia
Yevgeny Deyneka	United Russia
Sergey Baranov	United Russia
~~Leonid Slutsky~~	Liberal Democratic Party
Andrey Lebedev	Liberal Democratic Party
Igor Rikhtikov	Liberal Democratic Party
Anton Belonuchkin	Liberal Democratic Party
Vadim Grishkov	Communist Party
Yevgeny Tiron	Communist Party
Sergey Morenkov	New People

== See also ==
- 2026 Russian regional elections
