= Dmitry Vasilenko =

Dmitry Vasilenko may refer to:

- Dmitry Vasilenko (politician) (born 1969), Russian politician
- Dmitri Vasilenko (1975-2019), Russian gymnast
