= Zavatskaya =

Zavatskaya (Russian: Завацкая) is a surname, the feminine form of Zavatsky. Notable people with the surname include:

- Bill Zavatsky (born 1943), American poet, jazz pianist, and translator
- Katarina Zavatska (born 2000)
- Yana Zavatskaya (born 1970), Soviet Russian prose writer and translator
