= Malyarov =

Malyarov (masculine, Russian: Маляров) or Malyarova (feminine, Russian: Малярова) is a Russian surname. Notable people with the surname include:

- Kirill Malyarov (born 1997), Russian footballer
- Nikita Malyarov (born 1989), Russian footballer
- Igor Malyarov (1965-2003), Soviet Russian politician and journalist
