= Sergey Malinkovich =

Russian politician, current leader of the Communists of Russia party

- Сергей Малинкович

Chairman of the Central Committee of the Communists of Russia
- Incumbent
- Assumed office 18 March 2022
- Preceded by: Maxim Suraykin

Member of the Altai Krai Legislative Assembly
- In office September 2021 – September 2026

Personal details
- Born: 27 May 1975 (age 51) Leningrad, Soviet Union
- Party: Communists of Russia (2009–present)
- Other political affiliations: CPRF (until 2001); CPLO (2003–present)

Sergey Alexandrovich Malinkovich (Russian: Сергей Александрович Малинкович; born 27 May 1975) is a Russian politician, current Chairman of the Communists of Russia party and Member of the Altai Krai Legislative Assembly, and founder of the Communists of Petersburg and the Leningrad Oblast. On 28 December 2023, he was nominated as the Communists of Russia party candidate for President of Russia in the 2024 presidential election.

== Biography ==
=== Early years; Secretary of the Central Committee of the Communists of Russia party ===
Malinkovich was born in Leningrad to schoolteachers. He was engaged in youth politics since 1995, joining the Russian Communist Youth League. He has worked as a locksmith since 1996, and was a foreman. At the same time, he was engaged in Komsomol (All-Union Leninist Young Communist League) and party work.

In 2000, Malinkovich was elected to the local council of Smolninskoye Municipal Okrug in St. Petersburg, Russia. In 2001, he left the Communist Party of the Russian Federation due to disagreements with the leadership of the party.

In 2003, the public organization "Communists of Petersburg" was created from the former branch of the Union of Communist Youth, and Malinkovich was elected first secretary of the Communists of Petersburg. The organization, later renamed "Communists of Petersburg and the Leningrad Oblast", gained its main popularity thanks to various outrageous statements and provocative actions.

In 2008 he wrote an open letter to Ukrainian-born actress Olga Kurylenko, who played a Bolivian agent in the James Bond film Quantum of Solace. In it Malinkovich wrote: "In the name of all communists we appeal to you ... deserter of Slavic world. The Soviet Union gave you free education, free medical care but nobody knew you would commit an act of intellectual and moral betrayal and become a movie girl of Bond, who in his movies kills hundreds of Soviet people and citizens of other socialist countries."

In 2009 Malinkovich joined the newly established Communists of Russia party, and took the post of Secretary of the Central Committee of the party.

=== 2010–19 ===
In 2010, when at the 2010 Winter Olympics in Vancouver, Canada, Russian figure skater Evgeni Plushenko finished second to American Evan Lysacek in the men's singles competition, Malinkovich opined "Everyone knows that Canada is a U.S. colony and all the [Olympic] judges are under the White House's thumb."

He ran unsuccessfully for the Legislative Assembly of Saint Petersburg in 2011, mayor of Petrozavodsk (the capital city of the Republic of Karelia, Russia) in 2013, and governor of Nenets Autonomous Okrug (a federal subject of Russia, and an autonomous okrug of Arkhangelsk Oblast) in 2014. In 2016 Malinkovich ran for the State Duma (the lower house of the Federal Assembly of Russia), and in 2017 he also ran in by-elections to the State Duma of the VII convocation in the Bryansk single-mandate electoral district No. 77, but did not receive a deputy mandate.

In November 2018, Malinkovich called for the criminal prosecution of Vladimir Petrov, a lawmaker in the Leningrad region, for insulting religious believers by calling for Lenin’s preserved body to be buried. He said Petrov's proposal had violated the Criminal Code of Russia by insulting religious feelings and inciting hatred, and that he planned to "keep hounding" Petrov for his remarks.

In June 2019, he demanded that Russia's Federal Service for Supervision of Communications, Information Technology and Mass Media (Roskomnadzor) block access to the "filthy" HBO mini-series Chernobyl, and demanded that criminal libel cases be launched against the creators of the series under the Criminal Code of Russia.

=== 2020–present; Chairman of the Communists of Russia party ===
In 2021, The Moscow Times described Malinkovich as "a burly, shaven-headed man who wears a golden pin in the shape of an AK-47 assault rifle in his red tie." That year, he was elected as a deputy to the Altai Krai Legislative Assembly in Siberia as a member of Communists of Russia.

On 18 March 2022, an extraordinary congress of the Communists of Russia voted to appoint Malinkovich its Chairman after ousting its former leader Maxim Suraykin for his alleged connections with "unfriendly countries", fraud, and "bourgeois way of life". Suraykin called the congress "fake," and said that he was still supported by the majority of the party members.

In August 2022 Malinkovich was registered to participate in the Tambov Oblast gubernatorial election. In November 2022, Malinkovich accused musician Andrey Razin from the pop music group Laskovyi Mai (Tender May) of treason for selling the rights to its songs to an American company.

On 28 December 2023, Malinkovich was nominated by an overwhelming majority as the Communists of Russia party candidate for President of Russia in the March 15–17, 2024 presidential election. Malinkovich promised a program like Stalin's ten blows, against United States capitalism and imperialism, and victory in Russia's war against Ukraine. In February 2024, the CEC of the Russian Federation refused to register Milinkevich as a candidate.

== See also ==
- Candidates in the 2024 Russian presidential election
