= Communists of Petersburg and the Leningrad Oblast =

Communists of Petersburg and the Leningrad Oblast Коммунисты Петербурга и Ленинградской области
- Abbreviation: CPLO (English); КПЛО (Russian)
- Chairman of Central Committee: Sergey Malinkovich
- Founded: 12 April 2003; 23 years ago
- Registered: 24 November 2003; 22 years ago
- Split from: Communist Party of the Russian Federation
- Headquarters: 10th building, Grechesky Avenue, Saint Petersburg, Russia. 191014
- Membership (2003): 500
- Ideology: Communism; Marxism–Leninism; Scientific communism Left-wing populism
- Political position: Far-left
- National affiliation: United Socialist Party of Russia (2007-2008); Communists of Russia (2012-)
- Colours: Red
- Slogan: «Socialism! Labor! Family! Fatherland!» (Russian: «Социализм! Труд! Семья! Отечество!»)
- Anthem: The Internationale

Party flag

Website
- kplo.ru

The Communists of Petersburg and the Leningrad Oblast (CPLO or CP; Russian: Коммунисты Петербурга и Ленинградской области; КПЛО, КП; Kommunisty Peterburga i Leningradskoy oblasti, KPLO, KP) is an interregional public organization that was founded on April 12, 2003. Officially to the system of the Rosreestr on November 24, 2003. The basis of the organization "Communists of Petersburg" in 2003, the branch of communist youth St. Petersburg branch of communist youth, as well as members of regional CPRF committees from some districts of St. Petersburg.

The organization gained its main popularity thanks to various outrageous statements and provocative actions. There is an opinion that the CPLO functions as a clownish organization, whose task is to provoke and discredit the communists by disseminating shocking statements on their behalf. However, the representatives of CPLO themselves, in their interviews with the media, believe that this version of their activities is being disseminated by "bloggers hired by KPLO's political competitors."

Since 2012, CPLO has been one of the founders of the political party Communists of Russia.

== CPLO ideology ==
CPLO declares striving for partnership with the CPRF and with A Just Russia, a member of the Socialist International. In the official documents of the CPLO it is noted that "We, the Communists, value the theoretical and practical legacy of K. Marx, V. I. Lenin, J. V. Stalin, as well as, albeit to varying degrees, Plekhanov, Gramsci, Luxemburg, Che Guevara, Gandhi. Unlike other communist parties, factions and platforms are allowed in the CPLO: there is a socialist trend, guevarist, anti-globalist, national-patriotic, left-wing radical, etc. 60% of members adhere to the ideology of creative Marxism–Leninism, Soviet patriotism and socialist internationalism."

== CPLO activities ==
The CPLO emerged during an acute crisis in the CPRF, a split into supporters of Gennady Zyuganov and Gennady Semigin, when Yelena Drapeko, Valentin Knysh, Gennady Gamza, Tatyana Astrakhankina, etc., left the Communist Party. At the time of the split and later, the "Communists of Petersburg" took a neutral position, speaking kindly about both Gennady Zyuganov and his opponents.

KPLO became known in Russia and abroad in connection with numerous statements and actions, the style and forms of which turned out to be shocking for the traditional communist movement in Russia. Thus, in January 2005, the Communists of Petersburg urged veterans and pensioners not to pay for public transport; from that moment on, all the initiatives of the KPLO began to be covered with more or less regularity by the media. Then, to win over the youth audience and, according to the leaders of the organization, to provoke public discussion, dozens of initiatives and actions were undertaken that had a great public response. Among them are the replacement of the plates of Belgradskaya Street with Milošević Street, the destruction of the model of the US missile defense bases near the American consulate, and the picketing of the Constantine Palace during the G8 summit. Imitation or reconstruction of the establishment of the Estonian Soviet Republic on the territory of Estonia or Russian regions bordering on Estonia, strict monitoring of the construction of the Ring Road in Saint Petersburg, making icons with the image of Joseph Stalin and calling for the canonization of Stalin, renaming the Podosye village of the Pskov Oblast into the Stalin village by gathering, disruption of the celebration of the birthday of the speaker of the Legislative Assembly of Saint Petersburg Vadim Tyulpanov in the elite "Taleon Club" etc.

Of particular interest and the most varied assessments of the public were aroused by the statements of the CPLO with the assessment of the released films, the colorization of Soviet films, as well as events in the world of sports and the statement of versions about the existence of alien intelligence. As the leaders of the CPLO have repeatedly stressed, the modern communist party "must be able to smile." According to the leaders of the CPLO, their organization wants to achieve a permanent presence of communists in the life of society, in all spheres of public interest.

CPLO rarely conducts unauthorized actions, but its leaders were repeatedly detained during pickets and rallies, and the party's office was subjected to violent searches. CPLO has always strongly opposed joint actions with the banned NBP, the so-called orange forces, nationalists, etc.

=== Participation in election campaigns ===
Despite their status as a public organization, the Communists of Petersburg immediately began to actively participate in election campaigns, playing on the contradictions between the various flanks of the left movement. So, in the fall of 2003, in the first round of elections for the Governor of Saint Petersburg, the CP supported Alexey Timofeev, a deputy of the city parliament (Timofeev appeared on TV with the CP emblem in his hands), but Timofeev received about 1% of the votes and later the KP refused to cooperate with him.

In the second round of the gubernatorial elections, the Communists of Petersburg announced their support for the former vice-governor in the government of Vladimir Yakovlev, candidate Anna Markova, which was widely publicized by her headquarters.

Markova received 23% of the vote, and therefore relations between the Matviyenko administration and the Communists of Petersburg remained tense for some time.

In the by-elections to the Legislative Assembly in March 2005 in the Krasnogvardeysky District of the city in a single-mandate constituency, the independent left-wing candidate Igor Chubarov, who used the support of the CP, received 20%, and the CPRF candidate - 6%.

The situation was changed by the introduction of elections by party lists. However, by this time the Communists of Petersburg and the Leningrad Oblast (received Interregional status in 2006) were already a well-known organization and were simultaneously invited to several coalitions. At the elections to the Legislative Assembly of Saint Petersburg in March 2007, CPLO entered the list of a small United Socialist Party of Russia (SEPR), headed by Vladimir Putin's judo coach, State Duma deputy Vaslily Shestakov and former vice-governor of St. Petersburg Alexander Potekhin. 9 members of the CPLO became candidates for deputies of the Legislative Assembly on the list of this party. The signatures collected by the union were rejected by the St. Petersburg Election Commission, as were Yabloko's lists. Later, SEPR secured an election restoration in the city court of St. Petersburg two weeks before the vote. In crisis conditions, the leader of the CPLO, municipal deputy Sergey Malinkovich, was invited to represent SEPR at the debates on the RTR TV channel. These speeches, in which the SEPR was presented by Malinkovich as an "electoral union of socialists and communists" and an extremely populist program (the speaker promised to cancel the rent if the bloc wins), according to CPLO's own statements, made the organization widely known to the city, and also significantly raised the SEPR rating from the level of statistical errors up to 1.5-2 percent.

Then SEPR was removed from the elections by the decision of the Supreme Court of Russia. In these conditions, the CPLO announced the support of 2 candidates from the Communist Party of the Russian Federation in the inner city districts - Alexander Olkhovsky (27th district) and Yuri Savin (46th district), who have long been associated with the CPLO. In other constituencies, the Communists of St. Petersburg proposed to voters to boycott the elections in protest against the cancellation of the registration of the SEPR. Both candidates used the support of the CPLO in their campaigning. Alexander Olkhovsky was elected a deputy of the Legislative Assembly on the list of the Communist Party of the Russian Federation and became Chairman of the Industry Commission of the City Parliament and deputy head of the Communist Party faction. Olkhovsky subsequently repeatedly declared his sympathy for the KPLO, as an actively operating communist organization. Yuri Savin took second place in his constituency. The CPLO officially congratulated the CPRF on the creation of a faction in the city parliament and demonstrated its loyalty to the CPRF, but the leader of the regional party organization V. Fedorov repeatedly criticized the CPLO unilaterally, which only aroused greater media interest in the Communists of Petersburg.

In 2007, SEPR joined the A Just Russia party, after which the CPLO began to cooperate with the party of Sergei Mironov, which proclaimed "socialism of the 21st century." In the fall of 2007, CPLO turned to the St. Petersburg branch of the CPRF with a proposal to form a joint list of candidates for elections to the State Duma and was refused. After that, the CPLO officially supported the list of Just Russia and organized the Congress of Young Communists of Russia in St. Petersburg on November 7, 2009, which also supported the list of candidates for the SR and harshly criticized the CPRF, accusing it of ineffective activities, the absence of workers on the lists, etc. to note that most of the St. Petersburg media widely covered this event, which was organized colorfully, in the style of the CPSU congresses, with the laying of flowers at the Field of Mars, and, in particular, in the media materials, more attention was paid to the coverage of the Congress than the demonstration of the Communist Party on November 7.

ВIn March 2008, during the presidential elections, they called on to reject the system of presidential power and write on the bulletin "Power to the Soviets!" Then СPLO attributed to their agitation the fact that 21 thousand ballots in St. Petersburg and about 500 thousand ballots in the country were spoiled.

In 2004, 2005, 2009 СPLO has invariably sought the election of its leaders - Sergei Malinkovich, Viktor Perov, Yuri Savin and other deputies of the municipal councils of St. Petersburg and the Leningrad Region.

In 2009, CPLO candidates ran in local elections, both from the CPRF and from the A Just Russia party. All candidates from this party were supported by the CPLO in the elections of local councils of Saint Petersburg and Leningrad Oblast in 2009. Previously, CPLO again turned to the Communist Party of the Russian Federation with a proposal to form a single list, but was again refused by the Leningrad Regional Committee of the CPRF.

At the same time, using the support of the CPLO, A Just Russia successfully took part in the elections of municipal councils in the Leningrad Region, having received almost the same number of mandates as the Communist Party of the Russian Federation (56 versus 59). Initially, half of the members of the leadership of the CPRF were and are members of the CP, since formally the CP is a public unification.

CPLO constantly calls on the Communist Party of the Russian Federation and A Just Russia to establish allied relations, publishes on its website materials of the CPRF and Zyuganov's appeals, trying to demonstrate an equally positive attitude towards both left-wing parties and at the same time significant independence from them .

== Known members of CPLO ==
The founder and leader of the CPLO (Chairman of the Central Committee) Sergei Aleksandrovich Malinkovich (born 1975) was one of the key figures in the St. Petersburg branch of the KPRF youth movement (Russian Communist Youth Union, the Leninist Komsomol of the Russian Federation (CPRF)) in 1996–2001, being in these years the secretary of the Central Committee of the LYCL RF for international relations and the first secretary of the Leningrad Regional Committee of the LYCL RF, assistant to the deputy of the State Duma from the CPRF Yuri Belov.

Having ceased to be a member of the CPRF in 2001, Malinkovich, unlike other opponents of Gennady Zyuganov (Seleznyov, Podberezkin, Potapov, Kuvaev, Semigin, Tikhonov, etc.), focused not on criticizing the CPRF, but on trying to create a more active and operatively operating communist organization, formally supporting the CPRF and expressing sympathy for all existing left movements, including A Just Russia. As a rule, it is Malinkovich who represents CPLO as a newsmaker. Most observers associate with the ideas of Malinkovich the resonant initiatives and actions of the CPLO. Since 2000, Malinkovich has been a permanent member of the Smolninskoye Municipal Okrug in Saint Petersburg.

Mikhail Mashkovtsev — publicist, 2000-2007 Governor of Kamchatka Oblast (considered the last "red governor"), joined CPLO in early 2008 after moving to St. Petersburg and quickly became one of the leaders of the organization. Like many CPLO members, Mashkovtsev is formally a member of the CPRF, but only nominally. He considers it necessary to have a complete union of CPLO with A Just Russia.

Viktor Perov — is engaged in organizational work in CPLO, supervises the organization's cells in the Leningrad Region. Since 2000, he has been a deputy of the city council of one of the largest industrial monotowns in the Leningrad Oblast, Slantsyt. Repeatedly detained by law enforcement agencies for organizing protest actions

Sergey Hovanisyan — Lieutenant Colonel, State Counselor of the Second Class, former member of the City Election Commission of St. Petersburg from the CPRF (until 2004), former member of the Bureau of the Civil Code of the CPRF. In the CPRF, he was considered one of the developers of the theory of state patriotism. In CPLO, he is responsible for ideological work. Assistant to the deputy of the CPRF faction in the Legislative Assembly of St. Petersburg Olkhovsky.

Yuri Savin - lawyer, Deputy Head of the Smolninskoye Municipal Okrug. The last first secretary of the Smolninsky RK of the Komsomol of Leningrad. Expresses the position of those KPLO members who consider it necessary to subordinate CPLO to the Communist Party of the Russian Federation

With a nominal number of 500 CPLO members, its asset is no more than 100 people, the average age of which really ranges from 30 to 50 years.

== Creation of the Communist Party Communists of Russia ==
On April 22, 2012, the III Congress of the "Communists of Russia" organization took place, at which a decision was made to transform it into a political party. Sergei Malinkovich and a number of other leaders of the CPLO became members of the Politburo of the Central Committee of the Communists of Russia Party.

June 7 of the same year, the political party Communists of Russia was officially registered by the Ministry of Justice.

== See also ==
- documentary comedy «Nepal Forever»
