= Russian Labour Front =

Russian Labour Front Российский трудовой фронт
- Abbreviation: RTF
- Leader: Alexander Batov
- Founders: Viktor Tyulkin; Sergei Udaltsov
- Founded: 22 February 2010
- Registered: 4 December 2012
- Dissolved: 27 February 2020 (deregistered)
- Merger of: RCWP-CPSU; Left Front
- Split from: RCWP-CPSU (2022)
- Membership (2012): 60,000
- Ideology: Communism; Marxism–Leninism
- Political position: Far-left
- Colours: Blue and orange Red (former)
- Anthem: "The Internationale" "Einheitsfrontlied"

Website
- rotfront.org

Russian Labour Front (RTF; Russian: Российский трудовой фронт; РТФ), formerly Russian United Labour Front (ROT FRONT; Russian: Российский объединённый трудовой фронт; РОТ ФРОНТ), is a Marxist-Leninist party in Russia. It was formed by the Left Front, Russian Communist Workers' Party (RCWP), and several unions on 21 December 2010, but was only registered on 4 December 2012 on the eighth attempt.

On 27 February 2020, the party was de-registered by the Supreme Court of Russia after the Ministry of Justice appealed for the party's liquidation over its non-participation in elections.

Logo before 2022

Flag before 2022

== Split from the RCWP ==
In 2022, the organization split from the Russian Communist Workers' Party and was rebranded under the leadership of Alexander Batov; The word "united" was removed from the name, its abbreviation was changed to "RTF", and the design of the website was changed to feature the colour blue more prominently, with red having previously been the primary colour, while communist symbols were removed. The rebranding was preceded by disagreements over the RCWP's support for the Russian invasion of Ukraine and the expulsion of Batov from the RCWP.

The RCWP plans to re-organise the ROT FRONT with the United Communist Party.

== See also ==
- Communist Party of Social Justice
- Communist Party of the Russian Federation
- Communists of Russia
- Left Front (Russia)
- Russian Communist Workers' Party of the Communist Party of the Soviet Union
- Russian Socialist Movement
