= Communists of Russia =

Communist party in Russia

Communists of Russia Коммунисты России Kommunisty Rossii
- Abbreviation: CPCR (English); KPKR (Russian)
- Chairman: Sergey Malinkovich
- First Deputy Chairman: Ruslan Khugayev
- Founder: Maxim Suraykin
- Founded: 23 May 2009; 17 years ago (as movement); 22 April 2012; 14 years ago (as party)
- Registered: 7 June 2012; 14 years ago
- Merger of: NSKM RF; Communists of Petersburg; Communists of Far East
- Preceded by: All-Russian Communist Party of the Future
- Headquarters: 6 Maksimova street, Moscow 123098
- Newspaper: Communists of Russia
- Youth wing: All-Russian Leninist Young Communist League
- Membership (2018): 50,000
- Ideology: Communism; Marxism–Leninism; Stalinism; Anti-revisionism
- Political position: Far-left
- International affiliation: IMCWP (observer)
- Colours: Red
- Slogan: "Workers of the world, unite!" (Russian: "Proletarii vsekh stran, soyedinyaytes'!")
- Anthem: «Гимн па́ртии большевико́в» ("Hymn of the Bolshevik Party")
- Seats in the State Duma: 0 / 450
- Seats in the Federation Council: 0 / 170
- Governors: 0 / 85
- Seats in the Regional Parliaments: 23 / 3,994

Party flag

Website
- komros.org

The Communist Party "Communists of Russia" (CPCR; Russian: Коммунистическая партия «Коммунисты России»; КПКР; Kommunisticheskaya partiya «Kommunisty Rossii», KPKR) or simply Communists of Russia (CR; Russian: Коммунисты России; КР; Kommunisty Rossii, KR) is an anti-revisionist Marxist–Leninist communist party in Russia. Communists of Russia was founded in May 2009 as a public non-commercial organisation, and officially registered as a political party in April 2012.

The party has regional organisations in 69 regions and operates in 70 regions of Russia and has official affiliation with two inter-regional public associations: the Communists of St. Petersburg and Leningrad Region and the Communists of the Far East. The party's main rival on the left of Russia's political spectrum is the Communist Party of the Russian Federation (CPRF), which sees itself as the successor to the Communist Party of the Soviet Union (CPSU). The KR considers itself an alternative to the CPRF, which it believes is no longer a Marxist party and will not be able to return to power as long as Gennady Zyuganov is First Secretary. However, the party has been widely described as a spoiler party, including by the CPRF.

On 18 March 2022, an extraordinary party congress was held, at which a new chairman of the Central Committee of the party, Sergey Malinkovich, was elected. On 28 December 2023, he was nominated by an overwhelming majority as the party candidate for president of Russia in the 2024 presidential election. Malinkovich promised a program like Stalin's ten blows, against United States capitalism and imperialism, and for victory in Russia's war against Ukraine.

== Platform ==
For the 2016 Russian legislative election, the Communists of Russia released an electoral platform titled "Ten Stalinist Strikes on Capitalism", which called for broad nationalization, the return of the death penalty for certain crimes, medical reform, and a constitutional ban on raising the retirement age.

== Election results ==
=== Presidential elections ===
Election	Candidate	First round		Second round		Result
Election	Candidate	Votes	%	Votes	%	Result
2018	Maxim Suraykin	499,342	0.68%			Lost ✗
2024	Sergey Malinkovich	Not admitted to the elections				

On 28 December 2023, Sergey Malinkovich was nominated by an overwhelming majority as the party candidate for President of Russia in the March 15-17, 2024 presidential election. Malinkovich promised a program like Stalin's ten blows, against United States capitalism and imperialism, and victory in Russia's war against Ukraine.

=== Legislative elections ===
Election	Party leader	Performance					Rank	Government
Election	Party leader	Votes	%	± pp	Seats	+/–	Rank	Government
2016	Maxim Suraykin	1,192,595	2.27%	New	0 / 450	New	5th	Extra-parliamentary
2021	Maxim Suraykin	715,685	1.27%	▼1.00	0 / 450	0	▼8th	Extra-parliamentary
2026	Sergey Malinkovich	555,943	0.84%	▼0.33	0 / 450	0	8th	Extra-parliamentary

=== Regional elections ===
At the Russian regional elections in 2012, the party got 2 to 3.5 percent of the vote and two seats.

==== Khakassia ====
In the 2018 Khakassia Supreme Council election, the Communists of Russia won 8.01% of the vote, and won 2 of the 50 seats on the Supreme Council.

==== Nenets Autonomous Okrug ====
In the 2018 Nenets Autonomous Okrug Assembly of Deputies election, the Communists of Russia won 1 of the 19 seats on the Assembly of Deputies.

==== Rostov Oblast ====
In the 2018 Rostov Oblast Legislative Assembly election, the Communists of Russia won 5% of the vote, and won 1 of the 60 seats on the Legislative Assembly of the Rostov Region.

==== Tula Oblast ====
In the 2019 Tula Oblast Duma election, the Communists of Russia won 5.67% of the vote, and won 1 of the 36 seats on the Tula Oblast Duma.

==== Ulyanovsk Oblast ====
In the 2018 Ulyanovsk Oblast Legislative Assembly election, the Communists of Russia won 5.83% of the vote, and won 1 of the 36 seats on the Legislative Assembly.

==== Yaroslavl Oblast ====
In the 2018 Yaroslavl Oblast Duma election, the Communists of Russia won over 5% of the vote, winning 1 of the 50 seats on the Yaroslavl Oblast Duma.

== Criticism ==
The Communists of Russia has been criticized by a number of left-wing political groups and parties in Russia, as well as former members of the party, which have denounced the party as a spoiler and a front for the Russian government. In June 2015, the Communist Party of the Russian Federation filed a lawsuit with the Moscow Arbitration Court against the Communists of Russia party to stop using the name, citing their similarity. On 11 July 2016, the court dismissed this claim. In April 2016, the Communist Party of the Russian Federation also accused the Communists of Russia's electoral platform, titled "Ten Stalinist Strikes on Capitalism", of copying their own, titled "Zyuganov's Ten Theses on Bringing the Country Out of the Crisis".

The Russian United Labour Front, a left-wing organization in Russia, condemns the Communists of Russia as a front for government officials to splinter the left-wing vote. In an article they published, they highlight that the Communists of Russia was able to get official recognition immediately, whereas their organization had their recognition application refused seven times, and also note how the Communists of Russia were able to enter the Supreme Council of the Republic of Khakassia without collecting the signatures required for other parties who wish to compete in regional elections. They also accuse the party of running businessmen closely associated with the ruling United Russia party as candidates, gaining a disproportionate media spotlight, and needlessly attacking the Communist Party of the Russian Federation. The Russian United Labour Front also has exposed advertisements by the Communists of Russia which promise to pay people 300 Rubles for attending their rallies, and sent one writer to do just that.

Former deputy chairman of the Communists of Russia, Konstantin Zhukov, claimed that party leader Maxim Suraykin has warped the party from a genuine left-wing party into a tool of the government to cripple the Communist Party of the Russian Federation. According to Zhukov, Suraykin has removed the Communists of Russia's collective decision making structure, and ignored other senior party members to further turn the party into his own. Zhukov claimed that 10 of the 15 candidates the party put forth to compete in the 2016 Russian legislative election in Moscow were put forth by Andrey Vorobyov, the governor of Moscow Oblast and member of the ruling United Russia party, whereas just 2 were members of the Communists of Russia. For the 2019 Moscow City Duma election, Zhukov accused 26 of the party's 32 candidates of being put forth by Sergey Sobyanin, the Mayor of Moscow and United Russia member.

The news website Meduza noted that the Communists of Russia was running two candidates with virtually identical names to two Communist Party candidates in the 2021 Russian legislative election in Moscow.

== See also ==
- List of anti-revisionist groups
