= Maxim Suraykin =

Russian politician

- Максим Сурайкин
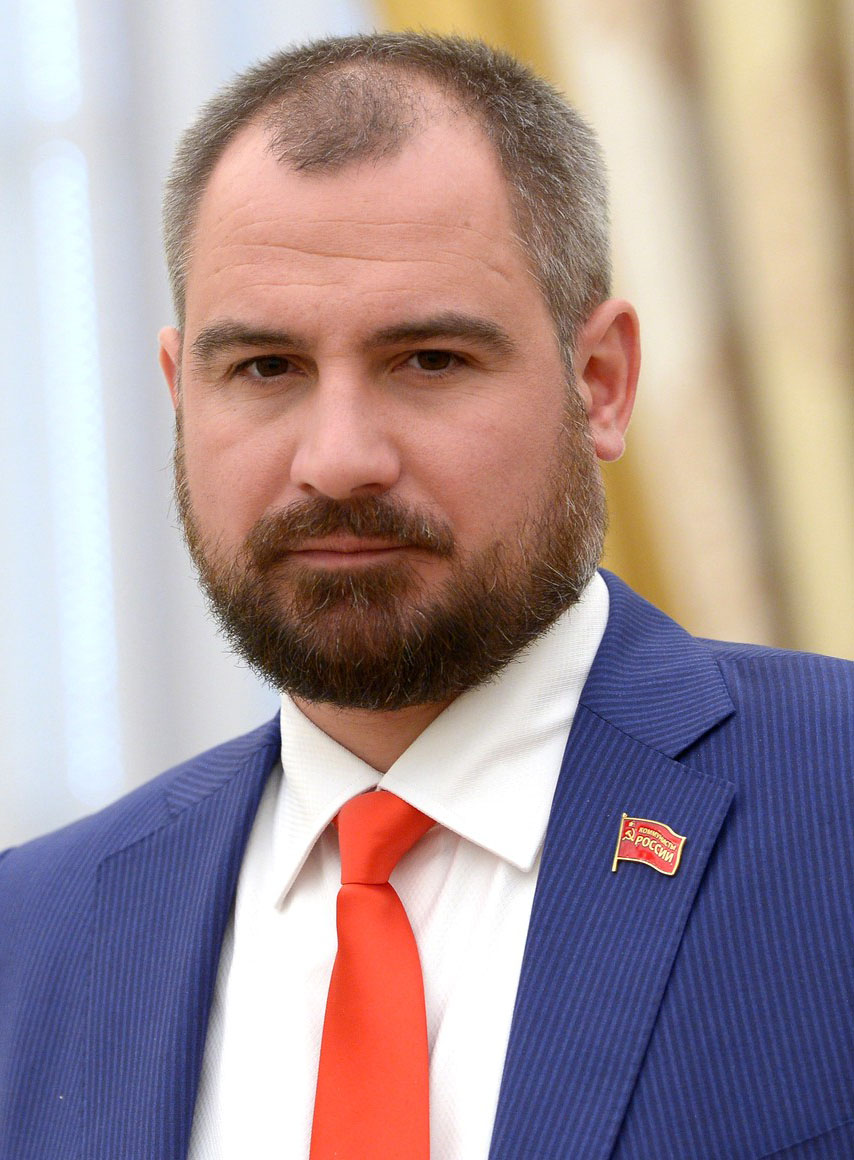
- Suraykin in 2018

Member of the Legislative Assembly of Ulyanovsk Oblast
- In office 18 September 2018 – 18 August 2022

Chairman of the Central Committee of the Communists of Russia
- In office 22 April 2012 – 18 March 2022
- Succeeded by: Sergey Malinkovich

Personal details
- Born: 8 August 1978 (age 48) Moscow, Russian SFSR, Soviet Union
- Party: Communists of Russia
- Other political affiliations: Communist Party (1996–2004)
- Education: Moscow State University of Railway Engineering

Maxim Alexandrovich Suraykin (Russian: Максим Александрович Сурайкин; born 8 August 1978) is a Russian politician who has been the leader of the political party Communists of Russia (2012–22) and member of the Legislative Assembly of Ulyanovsk Oblast (2018–22). Suraykin was the Communists of Russia's candidate in the 2018 presidential election.

== Life and career ==
=== Early life ===
Suraykin was born in Moscow.

In 1993, Suraykin was one of the defenders of the Supreme Soviet. In 2000, he graduated from Moscow State University of Railway Engineering. After graduating, he founded and for ten years ran a computer equipment repair company. Suraykin worked as a lecturer at the Department of Management of Moscow State University of Railways.

From 1996 to June 2004, he was a member of the Communist Party of the Russian Federation. He was the Secretary of the Kirov District Committee of the Communist Party of Moscow. He was elected a member of the Moscow City Committee of the Communist Party, a candidate member of the Central Committee of the Communist Party, and a delegate of the IX Congress of the Communist Party. Suraykin was part of the leadership of the youth section of the Communist Party in Moscow.

He was elected advisor of the District Assembly of the Tverskoy District of Moscow (1997–99), and worked in the Commission on Affairs of Minors.

In June 2002, he was elected Secretary of the Central Committee of the all-Russian public organization "Union of Communist youth of the Russian Federation" (SKM RF) on organizational and personnel work. In November 2004, he became the first Secretary of Central Committee SKM RF.

=== 2010-present ===
In 2010, he headed the public organization Communists of Russia, and in 2012 the party Communists of Russia. In 2013, Suraykin was nominated as a candidate at Moscow mayoral election, but he was not registered due to late submission of documents. In 2014, he ran for Governor of the Nizhny Novgorod Oblast, and he ran for Governor of the Ulyanovsk Oblast in 2016. Both times, he lost the elections. In the 2018 regional elections, he was elected to the Legislative Assembly of Ulyanovsk Oblast. On 19 September, he was elected Deputy Chairman of the Legislative Assembly. He joined the committee on budget and economic policy, as well as the committee on social policy, local self-government and civil society development.

After the 2022 Russian invasion of Ukraine, he proposed expelling foreign professional athletes from Russia as a retaliation against international sanctions.

On 18 March 2022, an extraordinary congress of the Communists of Russia voted to oust Suraykin for his alleged connections with "unfriendly countries", fraud, and "bourgeois way of life". It appointed Sergey Malinkovich as chairman instead. Suraykin called the congress "fake," and said that he was still supported by the majority of the party members.

== 2018 presidential campaign ==
In December 2016, it became known that the Communists of Russia nominated Suraykin for the presidential election in 2018. On 28 May 2017, the Plenum of the Central Committee of the "Communists of Russia" nominated Suraykin as candidate to participate in presidential election in 2018. On 24 December Suraykin was officially nominated at the Communists Russia National Convention. On the same day he submitted to the Central Election Commission.

During the election campaign, Suraykin strongly criticized the Communist party for the nomination of businessman Pavel Grudinin as presidential candidate. Suraykin said:

Grudinin, according to the Declaration, had an income amounted to 752 million rubles in 2015. Can you imagine how much money he has? Plus, he's the owner of the farm, which in itself is worth several billion rubles. This is a real billionaire. A very rich guy. And I understand if he gave his income to the party, for the benefit of the Communist cause. Still, there are decent people who earn a lot. But he still was a member of "United Russia". If a person earned billions, if the person was in the ruling party (United Russia), and then suddenly changes one's shoes into the Communists, to put it mildly, it is strange. To such a man the question immediately arises. Therefore, it is clear that a large part of the potential electorate would not support such a candidate.

Also, he criticized the leader of the Left Front Sergey Udaltsov for supporting Grudinin:

Pavel Grudinin – he is a true oligarch, a very rich man, and believe that all their activists it perceives as its employees. Just because he was used to such relations, he used to lead, he was to be the psychology of the owner. Therefore, I believe, Sergey Udaltsov is making a big mistake supporting Pavel Nikolayevich and agreeing to be his employee.

In his opinion, this decision is fraught with Udaltsov that he will turn away his supporters:

I think that many supporters of the "Left front" surprised by the choice of Sergey Udaltsov. They really appreciate what is happening, see this model of relations "chief — subordinate" and are unlikely to want to work on Grudinin. But if in the process of the campaign will emerge new billions of Pavel Nikolaevich, it will be a blow and Udaltsov. But he made a mistake.

At the same time, Suraykin himself was also criticized by the Communist party. He was accused of spoiling, especially after the release of his campaign video and logo, which completely copied the video and logo of Grudinin.

During the campaign Suraykin made several trips around the country. Following the election, he scored 499,342 votes (0.68%), taking seventh (penultimate) place.

== Electoral history ==
Election	Political result	Candidate	Party	Votes	%
2018 Russian presidential election Result; Turnout: 67.54%	Independent; Majority: 47,771,506 (64.92%)	Vladimir Putin	Independent	56,430,712	76.69
2018 Russian presidential election Result; Turnout: 67.54%	Independent; Majority: 47,771,506 (64.92%)	Pavel Grudinin	CPRF	8,659,206	11.77
2018 Russian presidential election Result; Turnout: 67.54%	Independent; Majority: 47,771,506 (64.92%)	Vladimir Zhirinovsky	LDPR	4,154,985	5.65
2018 Russian presidential election Result; Turnout: 67.54%	Independent; Majority: 47,771,506 (64.92%)	Ksenia Sobchak	Civic Initiative	1,238,031	1.68
2018 Russian presidential election Result; Turnout: 67.54%	Independent; Majority: 47,771,506 (64.92%)	Grigory Yavlinsky	Yabloko	769,644	1.05
2018 Russian presidential election Result; Turnout: 67.54%	Independent; Majority: 47,771,506 (64.92%)	Boris Titov	Party of Growth	556,801	0,76
2018 Russian presidential election Result; Turnout: 67.54%	Independent; Majority: 47,771,506 (64.92%)	Maxim Suraykin	CPCR	499,342	0,68
2018 Russian presidential election Result; Turnout: 67.54%	Independent; Majority: 47,771,506 (64.92%)	Sergey Baburin	ROS	479,013	0,65
2016 Ulyanovsk Oblast gubernatorial election Result; Turnout: 52.29%	United Russia; Majority: 152,177 (28.87%)	Sergey Morozov	United Russia	286,411	54.33
2016 Ulyanovsk Oblast gubernatorial election Result; Turnout: 52.29%	United Russia; Majority: 152,177 (28.87%)	Alexey Kurinny	CPRF	134,234	25.46
2016 Ulyanovsk Oblast gubernatorial election Result; Turnout: 52.29%	United Russia; Majority: 152,177 (28.87%)	Sergey Marinin	LDPR	34,631	6.57
2016 Ulyanovsk Oblast gubernatorial election Result; Turnout: 52.29%	United Russia; Majority: 152,177 (28.87%)	Olga Goryacheva	Yabloko	29,256	5.55
2016 Ulyanovsk Oblast gubernatorial election Result; Turnout: 52.29%	United Russia; Majority: 152,177 (28.87%)	Oleg Kalmykov	A Just Russia	13,509	2.56
2016 Ulyanovsk Oblast gubernatorial election Result; Turnout: 52.29%	United Russia; Majority: 152,177 (28.87%)	Maxim Suraykin	CPCR	12,851	2,44
2016 Ulyanovsk Oblast gubernatorial election Result; Turnout: 52.29%	United Russia; Majority: 152,177 (28.87%)	Lev Levitas	The Greens	4,626	0,88
2014 Nizhny Novgorod Oblast gubernatorial election Result; Turnout: 54.49%	United Russia; Majority: 1,242,438 (81.28%)	Valery Shantsev	United Russia	1,328,867	86.93
2014 Nizhny Novgorod Oblast gubernatorial election Result; Turnout: 54.49%	United Russia; Majority: 1,242,438 (81.28%)	Alexander Bochkaryov	A Just Russia	86,429	5.65
2014 Nizhny Novgorod Oblast gubernatorial election Result; Turnout: 54.49%	United Russia; Majority: 1,242,438 (81.28%)	Alexander Kurdyumov	LDPR	40,124	2.62
2014 Nizhny Novgorod Oblast gubernatorial election Result; Turnout: 54.49%	United Russia; Majority: 1,242,438 (81.28%)	Maxim Suraykin	CPCR	32,794	2.15
2014 Nizhny Novgorod Oblast gubernatorial election Result; Turnout: 54.49%	United Russia; Majority: 1,242,438 (81.28%)	Mikhail Kuznetsov	Patriots of Russia	14,622	0,96
2014 Nizhny Novgorod Oblast gubernatorial election Result; Turnout: 54.49%	United Russia; Majority: 1,242,438 (81.28%)	Andrey Zavyalov	Great Fatherland	7,262	0,48
2014 Nizhny Novgorod Oblast gubernatorial election Result; Turnout: 54.49%	United Russia; Majority: 1,242,438 (81.28%)	Rustam Dosayev	Civic Platform	6,103	0,40
