= Stalin Bloc – For the USSR =

Electoral alliance in Russia

Stalin Bloc – For the USSR Сталинский блок — за СССР
- Leader: Yevgeny Dzhugashvili; Viktor Anpilov; Stanislav Terekhov
- Founders: Viktor Anpilov; Stanislav Terekhov
- Founded: October 2, 1997
- Registered: November 3, 1999
- Dissolved: December 19, 1999
- Headquarters: Moscow, Russia
- Newspaper: Molniya (Lightning); Trudovaya Rossiya (Labour Russia)
- Youth wing: People's Patriotic Youth Union
- Ideology: Communism; Stalinism; Marxism-Leninism; Anti-revisionism; Soviet patriotism National Communism
- Political position: Far-left
- Member parties: Labour Russia; Union of Officers; Union (until 09.1999); Stalin Bloc; National Bolshevik Party (until 01.1999)
- Colours: Red
- Slogan: "For our Soviet homeland!" (Russian: "За нашу советскую родину!")
- Anthem: The Internationale

Party flag

The Stalin Bloc – For the USSR (Russian: Сталинский блок — за СССР, romanized: Stalinskiy blok — za SSSR), known before January 1999 as the Front of the Working People, Army and Youth for the USSR (Russian: Фронт трудового народа, армии и молодёжи за СССР; ФТР, romanized: Front trudovogo naroda, armii i molodyozhi za SSSR, abbr. FTR), was a coalition of communist political parties in Russia running together for the 1999 elections of the State Duma.

This coalition was composed by many small radical political parties including "Labour Russia" led by Viktor Anpilov, Union of Officers led by Stanislav Terekhov, "Union" led by G.I. Tikhonov, the Peoples Patriotic Union of Youth led by I.O. Maliarov, Union of Workers of Moscow, Bolshevik Platform CPSU, All-Union Communist Party Bolsheviks, Russian Association of Miners Invalids, Congress of Soviet Women, All Union Society for studying the legacy of Stalin and the Vanguard of Red Youth.

Aside from the leaders of the above movements, the Stalin Bloc included Joseph Stalin's well-known grandson, Yevgeny Dzhugashvili, a retired air force colonel.

The Bloc obtained 0.61% and 404,274 votes in the 1999 Russian legislative election.

== See also ==
- List of anti-revisionist groups
