= Russian Communist Youth League =

Russian Communist Youth League Российский коммунистический союз молодёжи
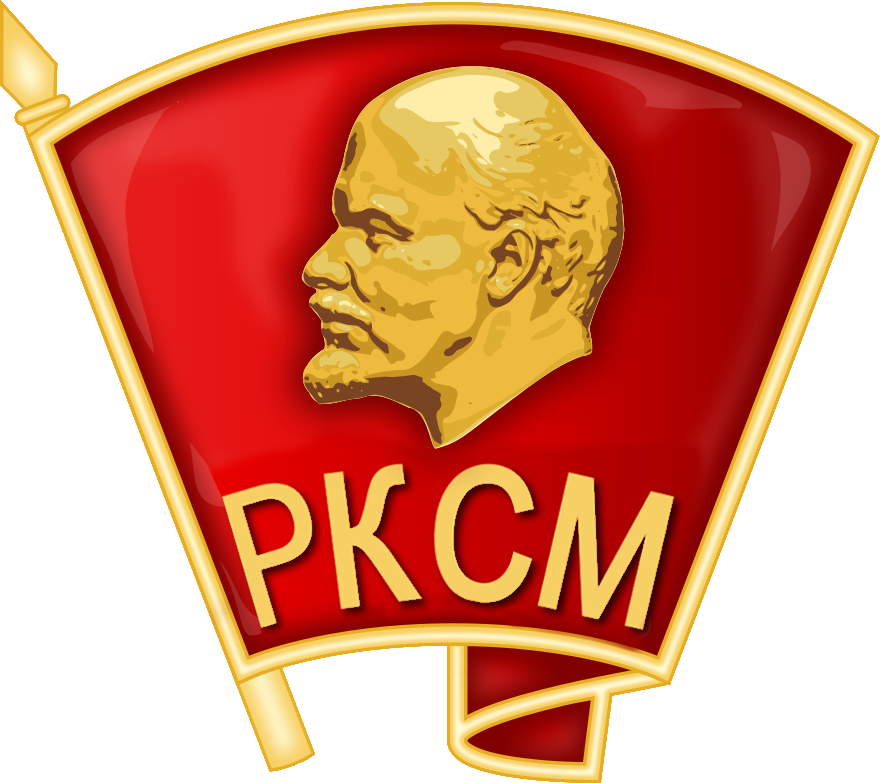
- Abbreviation: RCYL (English); РКСМ (Russian)
- First Secretary: Darya Mitina
- Founder: Igor Malyarov
- Founded: 23 January 1993; 33 years ago
- Preceded by: Komsomol
- Headquarters: Moscow, Russia
- Newspaper: Bumbarash-2017; Novosibirsk Komsomolets
- Membership (2018): 10,000
- Ideology: Communism; Marxism–Leninism; Stalinism
- Political position: Far-left
- International affiliation: World Federation of Democratic Youth
- Colours: Red
- Slogan: "One Union — one team!" (Russian: "Один Союз — одна команда!")

Website
- rksm.ru

The Russian Communist Youth League (RCYL; Russian: Российский коммунистический союз молодёжи; РКСМ; Rossiyskiy kommunisticheskiy soyuz molodozhi, RKSM) is an all-Russian youth public organization formed in 1993 to resume the activities of the Komsomol in Russia.

== Prehistory ==
The prehistory of the RCYL in post-Soviet Russia was the committee "For the revival of the Komsomol", created at the XXII Congress of the Komsomol, which decided to dissolve the All-Union Leninist Young Communist League. Then a group of delegates headed by Igor Malyarov created an organizing committee "For the revival of the Komsomol" and began work to prepare as soon as possible the XXIII (restoration) Congress of the Komsomol on the principles of loyalty to the traditions of the Komsomol and its communist ideology.Ю. Г. Коргунюк, С. Е. Заславский. Российская многопартийность: становление, функционирование, развитие. — М.: Фонд ИНДЕМ, 1996. However, in the conditions of the collapse of the Soviet Union, it was not possible to recreate a single all-union structure. And therefore, a number of regional organizations came up with the idea of creating a Russian Komsomol organization, which was formed on January 23, 1993 at the founding conference of the RCYL (the conference was held in a working hostel in Saint Petersburg).

== Activities ==
The I Congress of the RCYL was held on September 27–28, 1993 in Moscow. Igor Malyarov, a young employee of Moscow State University, was elected first secretary, and he remained the permanent leader of the Union until his death in 2003. In 1993, members of the Communist Union took part in the defense of the House of Soviets of Russia. After these events, the RCYL was banned, an arrest warrant was issued for Igor Malyarov, and he was forced to hide in Belarus. During this period, until February 1994, the organization actually worked in clandestine conditions.

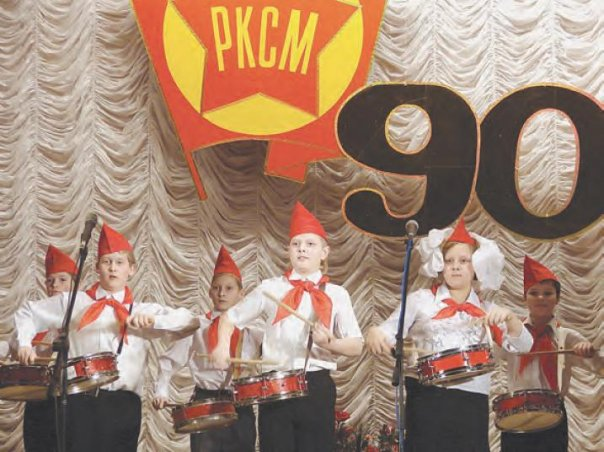
Gala evening dedicated to the 90th anniversary of the Russian Komsomol

After leaving the "underground" RCYL worked to protect its social rights of young people. So, in 1995, with the participation of members of the RKSM, the trade union "Student Protection" was organized, and in May 1995 in Moscow — the All-Russian Student Forum. In 1995, a member of the RCYL Central Committee Darya Mitina became a State Duma deputy on the list of the CPRF.

In 1996-1997, the Revolutionary Komsomol, RCYL(b), oriented towards the RСWP, emerged from the Russian Komsomol. At the same time, the Russian Komsomol became the nucleus of the union of the left and the people's patriotic youth organizations. Komsomol members became the initiators and organizers of the creation of the People's Patriotic Youth Union (NPSM). The first congress of this organization was held simultaneously with the next congress of the Komsomol in April 1999. Igor Malyarov was elected as the chairman of the NPSM.

The last V congress of the RCYL was held in November 2003 in the city of Novorossiysk. After the death of Igor Malyarov, Alexey Pokataev became the first secretary of the RCYL Central Committee, the second — Darya Mitina, deputy of the State Duma of the 2nd convocation. On February 6, 2010, a regular Plenum of the RCYL Central Committee took place, which also considered personnel issues - the plenum entrusted the duties of the first secretary of the RCYL Central Committee to Darya Mitina. Today, the RCYL remains one of the largest left-wing youth organizations with a ramified structure, various types of activities - participation in elections, protest actions, publications of the Komsomol press, social activities. From the first days of its existence, the RCYL actively participated in the left opposition movement.

The organization has international relations with Cuba, North Korea, Ukraine, and Belarus. For more than ten years, a program of children's summer recreation for Russian children has been carried out at the Sondovon international camp in the Democratic People's Republic of Korea, carried out on the basis of an agreement between the RCYL and the Kimilsungist-Kimjongilist Youth League. In recent years, RCYL delegates have traveled to Cuba to participate in the program of the Cuban international brigades. Ties are established with the Bolivarian Republic of Venezuela.

RCYL is a member of the World Federation of Democratic Youth and a member of the alter-globalization movement, sending its delegates to World Festival of Youth and Students and Social Forums in Europe and Russia.

In its daily activities, the RCYL pays attention to the holding of pickets, rallies and processions of defenders of peace, social and political rights of youth. Members of the RCYL hold protest actions "against imperialist wars, infringement of the rights of working youth and students." The RCYL regularly holds international meetings and seminars to exchange experience between regional organizations of the RCYL in Russia and proletarian organizations in other countries of the world.

The RCYL is not a party structure, but cooperates and works with many left-wing parties, trade unions and mass social movements in the territory of the former USSR and abroad.

== Organization structure ==
The supreme governing body of the RCYL is its congress, which elects the Central Committee (CC) and the Central Control Commission (CCC). The work of the RCYL in the period between congresses is directed by its Central Committee. It elects from among its members the first secretary of the Central Committee (the leader of the organization) and secretaries of the Central Committee for areas of activity, as well as the Bureau of the Central Committee. Also, the Central Committee determines the powers and procedure for the work of the Bureau of the Central Committee. Both the Central Committee of the RCYL and its Bureau are empowered to register the newly created regional branches of the RCYL.

The secretaries of the regional committees of the RCYL are elected by the plenary sessions of these committees, elected by the conferences of the regional offices. The regional committee registers the primary organizations of the RCYL. It also has the right to dissolve the primary organization or declare the re-registration of its members in the event of an actual termination of its activities or contradiction of its Charter of the RCYL.

The control body of the RCYL is the Central Control Commission. It monitors the financial and economic activities of the organization and the observance of the charter by the governing bodies of the RKSM when they make decisions, as well as when they consider letters, complaints and applications.

The upper age limit for members of the RCYL is 30 years, however, membership in the organization can be extended at the personal application of the Komsomol by the decision of the Bureau of the Central Committee of the RCYL, and is also automatically extended for members of the federal and territorial governing bodies of the RCYL. The lower age limit for members of the RCYL is 14 years, however, a member of the governing bodies of the RCYL must be at least 18 years old.

The number of RCYL is slightly less than 10 thousand people (as of November 2018).

== See also ==
- Komsomol
- Marxism–Leninism
- Leninist Komsomol of the Russian Federation
