= Russian Communist Workers Party =

Russian Communist Workers Party Российская коммунистическая рабочая партия
- Abbreviation: RCWP (English); РКРП (Russian)
- Leader: Viktor Anpilov; Viktor Tyulkin
- Founded: November 23, 1991
- Dissolved: October 27, 2001
- Preceded by: Marxist Platform of the CPSU; Movement of the Communist Initiative
- Succeeded by: Russian Communist Workers' Party of the Communist Party of the Soviet Union
- Headquarters: Saint Petersburg, Russia
- Newspaper: Trudovaya Rossiya; Sovetskiy Soyuz
- Youth wing: Revolutionary Communist Youth League (Bolshevik)
- Ideology: Communism; Marxism–Leninism; Stalinism; Anti-revisionism
- Political position: Far-left
- National affiliation: National Salvation Front (1992-1993)
- International affiliation: IMCWP; ICS
- Colours: Red
- Slogan: "Workers of the world, unite!" (Russian: "Пролетарии всех стран, соединяйтесь!")
- Anthem: "The Internationale"

Party flag

Website
- ркрп.рус

The Russian Communist Workers' Party (in Russian: Российская Коммунистическая Рабочая Партия; transcription: Rossiyskaya Kommunisticheskaya Rabochaya Partiya or RKRP) was a communist party in Russia. It was established in November 1991 with the aim of resurrecting socialism and the Soviet Union. It published a newspaper called Trudovaya Rossiya (Трудовая Россия; Working People's Russia) and the journal Sovetskiy Soyuz (Советский Союз; Soviet Union).

== History ==
The party was established on 23 November 1991 by members of the anti-revisionist platform of the Communist Party of the Soviet Union (CPSU) and the Communist Party of the Russian Soviet Federative Socialist Republic (CP RSFSR), both of which were banned following the failed 1991 Soviet coup d'état attempt against Mikhail Gorbachev.

In 1992 the party joined the National Salvation Front and its members took part in the clashes against forces loyal to Russian president Boris Yeltsin during the 1993 Russian constitutional crisis.

In February 1993, it was one of a number of Bolshevik groups invited to a conference at which the Communist Party of the Russian Federation (KPRF) was established. However, RKRP leader Viktor Anpilov joined with All-Union Communist Party Bolsheviks leader Nina Andreyeva in rejecting the KPRF as reformist and refused to join the new movement. Despite Anpilov's stance, much of the party's membership, including the entirety of the organisation in RKRP stronghold Kemerovo, defected to the KPRF soon after its establishment. The party was one of a number of groups barred from taking part in the 1993 Duma elections because they were linked, or perceived to be linked, to the October insurgency of that same year.

In October 2001, it merged with the Russian Party of Communists to form the Russian Communist Workers' Party – Revolutionary Party of Communists.

== See also ==
- List of anti-revisionist groups
