= Viktor Anpilov =

Russian politician (1945–2018)

- Виктор Анпилов
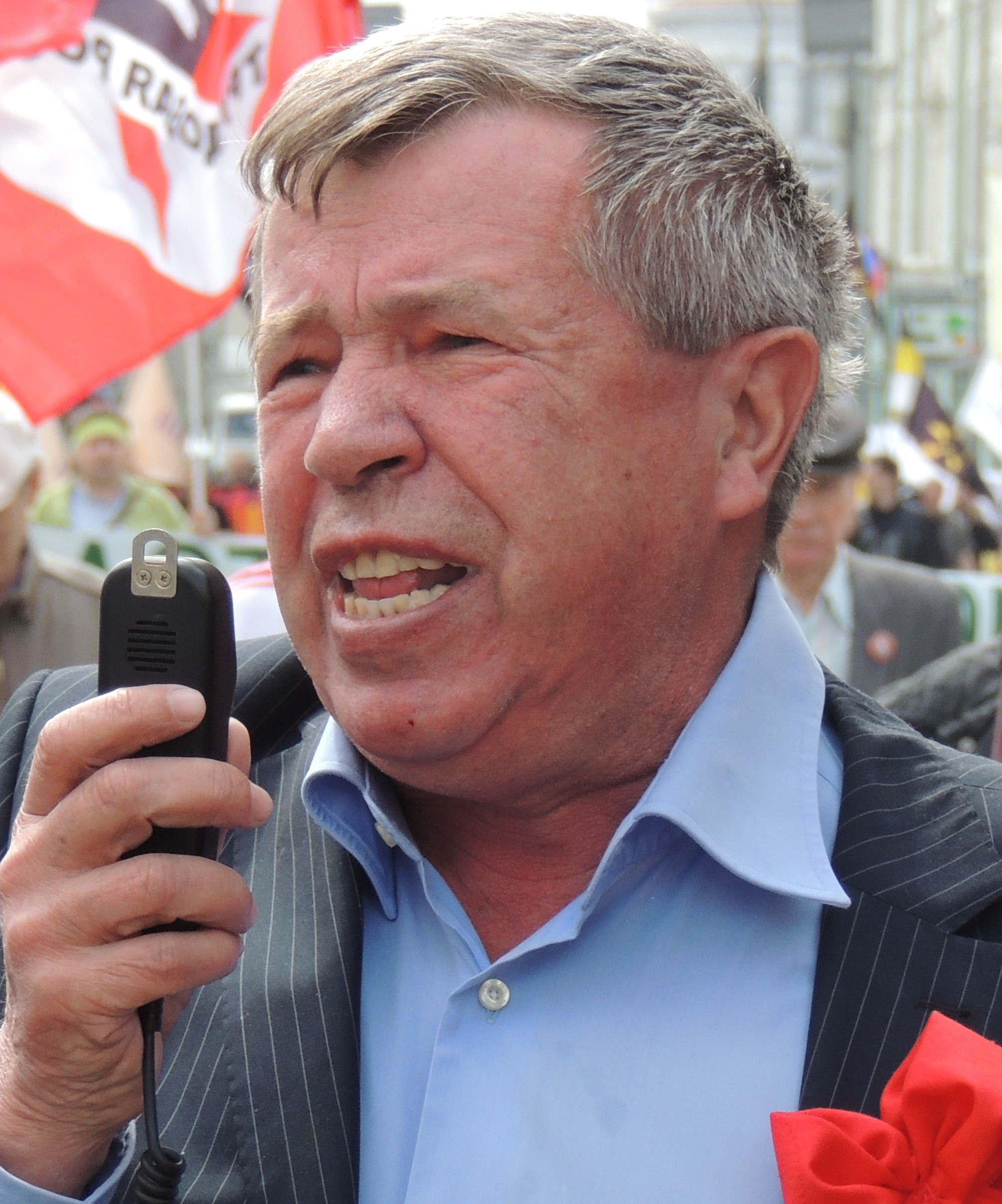
- Anpilov in 2012
- Born: 2 October 1945; Belaya Glina, Krasnodar Krai, Russia, Soviet Union
- Died: 15 January 2018 (aged 72); Moscow, Russia
- Education: Moscow State University
- Political party: CPSU (1972-1991); RCWP (1991-1992); Labour Russia (1992-2018)
- Viktor Anpilov's voice from the Echo of Moscow program, 7 November 2007

Viktor Ivanovich Anpilov (Russian: Ви́ктор Ива́нович Анпи́лов; 2 October 1945 – 15 January 2018) was a Russian hardline communist politician and trade unionist.

== Political activity ==
Anpilov joined the Communist Party of the Soviet Union in 1972. He worked as a Soviet journalist in Latin America. Anpilov was very fluent in Spanish.

In 1990, Anpilov was nominated as candidate for the Congress of People's Deputies and Moscow City Soviet. As a candidate, he was reported to have maintained links with the ultranationalist Pamyat movement. After the dissolution of the USSR, Anpilov became the leader of the movement Labour Russia.

During the 1993 Russian constitutional crisis, he was one of the leaders of the anti-Boris Yeltsin uprising.

In 1999, his movement joined the coalition Stalin Bloc – For the USSR.

In 2007 he took part in the Dissenters March organized to protest against president Vladimir Putin's policies. Anpilov was a well-known figure and had a certain popularity; sometimes he was also invited as a guest on TV shows.

In the 2012 presidential election, he supported Vladimir Zhirinovsky's candidacy.

== Personal ==
Anpilov was fluent in Spanish and Portuguese and had worked in Latin America.

== Personal life ==
He had been married since 1975 to Vera Yemelyanova Anpilova.

He had two children: a daughter, Anastasia, and a son, Sergey.

== Death ==
Anpilov died in 2018. He had been in a coma for the last three days of his life after a stroke.
