= Yana Zavatskaya =

Soviet Russian prose writer and translator

- Born: March 11, 1970; Saint Petersburg
- Occupation: Writer, science fiction writer, prosaist, translator, poet, blogger, opinion writer
- Political party: Die Linke, Communist Party of Germany (1990)
- Awards: "Running on Waves" Prize (2019)
- Website: blau_kraehe.livejournal.com

Yana Yulievna Zavatskaya (Russian: Яна Юльевна Завацкая; born 11 March 1970 in Leningrad) is a Soviet Russian prose writer and translator. Laureate of the 2019 "Running on Waves" Prize. Yana Zavatskaya is a social fiction writer. She also is a blogger (at LiveJournal, listed in the Top 100 bloggers). She writes for the Pravda.ru.

Her father was a mathematics teacher and poet. She grew up in Chelyabinsk. She completed four years of medical school. She was influenced by Sergey Kara-Murza.

In 1993, she moved with her family to Germany. In Germany, she works in a nursing home for elderly.

She is Catholic, and a was member of the German Communist Party. She left the party in 2023. She is now a member of the DKP. She called herself a feminist.

She has two children. Her great-grandfather died of starvation during the Siege of Leningrad.

She was criticized by Alexander Tarasov. She praised Kling's book QualityLand.

== Publications ==
Zavatskaya is the author of five books. Her first book was published by Eksmo. Her first novel is written in the genre of dystopia. Her articles are republished by the Russian Communist Workers' Party of the Communist Party of the Soviet Union.

Year	Title
2006	Ликей
2006	Нить надежды
2006	Эмигрант с Анзоры
2018	Холодная зона (Litres)
2019	Перезагрузка (Litres)
2020	Рассвет 2.0

Blogs (in the Russian Language):

https://blau-kraehe.livejournal.com

https://t.me/s/blaue_kraehe

== See also ==
- Helena Sheehan

== Sources ==
- Mitrofanova, A. V. "Religio-Political Utopia by Iana Zavatskaia". In: The Post-Soviet Politics of Utopia: Language, Fiction and Fantasy in Modern Russia. Ed.by Mikhail Suslov and Per-Arne Bodin. London: I. B. Tauris, 2020. Pp. 155—174.
