= Viktor Tyulkin =

Russian politician

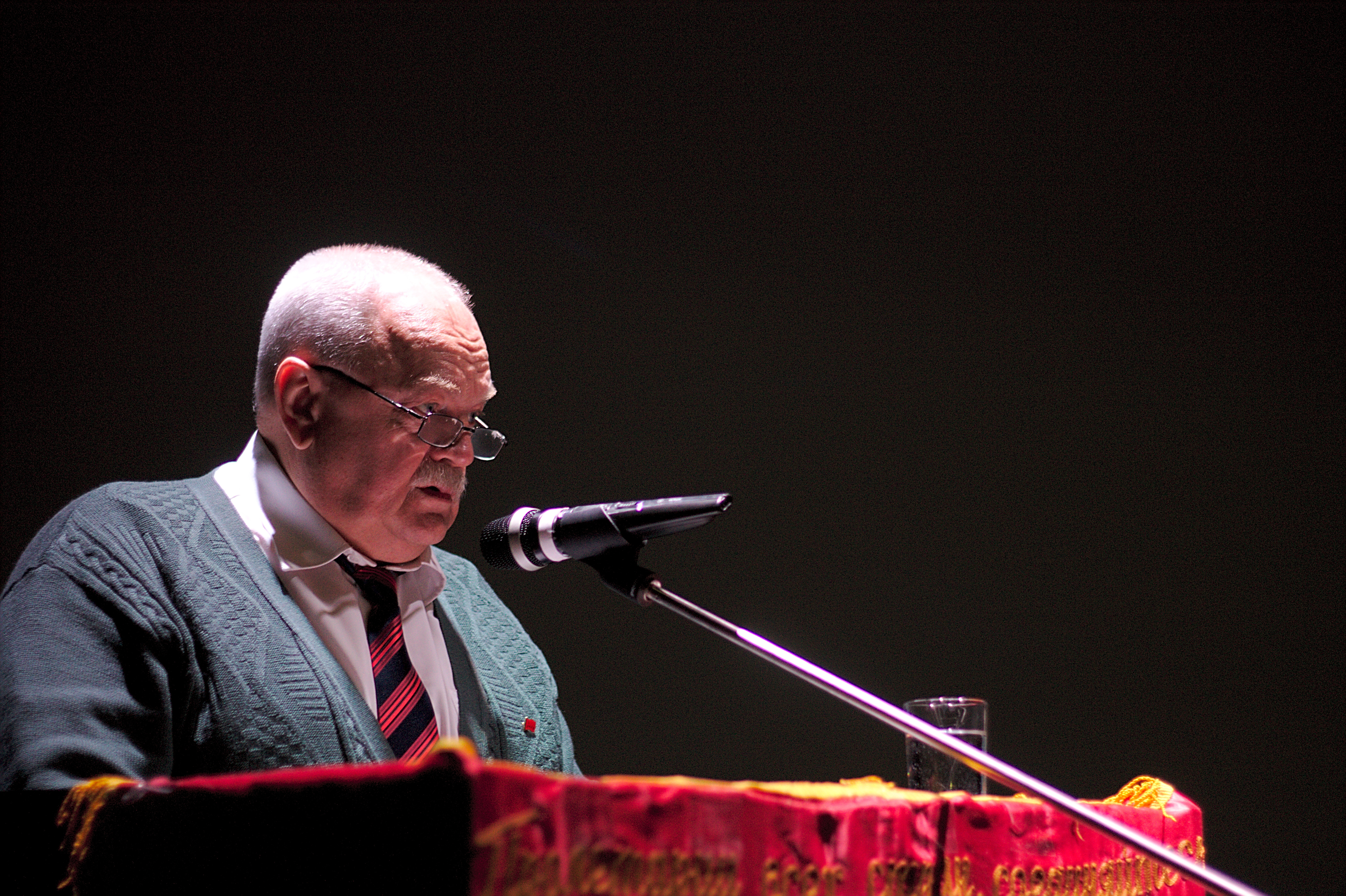
- Born: May 14, 1951 (age 75); Vladivostok, Russian SFSR, Soviet Union
- Occupation: Politician
- Political party: Russian Communist Workers' Party of the Communist Party of the Soviet Union

Viktor Arkadyevich Tyulkin (Russian: Ви́ктор Арка́дьевич Тю́лькин) (born May 14, 1951 in Vladivostok) is a Russian Communist politician. Tyulkin is the leader of the Russian Communist Workers' Party – Revolutionary Party of Communists (RKRP-RPK), a Communist hardline party. The RKRP-RPK considers the Communist Party of the Russian Federation (CPRF) to be reformist, but in the 2003 Duma Election Party leaders joined with the CPRF in an effort to consolidate the communist vote. Tyulkin was elected to the Duma for CPRF, while remaining a member of RKRP-RPK.

== Biography ==
Tyulkin was born into a Soviet naval officer's family. He is married with two sons.

One of Tyulkin's grandfathers was Volodimir Tyulkin – a member of РКП (б) from 1919, a participant in the Russian Civil War and the Great Fatherland War, and a colonel in the Red Army. His other grandfather was a member of the РСДРП (б) and in 1914 became the first chairman of Shlisselbourg advice council. He was killed in 1919 during the defense of Петрограда against the armies of Yudenich. His father was a communist and a colonel in the Soviet Army. His mother defended Leningrad during all 900 days of blockade during World War II.

He obtained a [281-ю average](sic) including extensive study of chemistry at the school of Leningrad. During 1968–1974, Tyulkin studied at the Leningrad military-mechanical university graduating as a Mechanical engineer specializing in "Dynamics of flight and their management". From 1974, he worked as foreman, senior foreman and chief of site at Leningrad Northern factory. From 1980 he successively moved from chief of site to chief of shop and chief of a technical department in a factory engaged in avant-garde research and production.

In 1988, Tyulkin was elected secretary of парткома НПО and in 1990 to Leningrad обкома КПСС. In 1989, he was selected as the deputy of the Advice (council) of the national deputies of the Kalininsky area of Leningrad. In 1985, he left the faculty of the Leningrad engineer-economic institute. He attended Tolyatti on a specialty "Organization and management" program and in 1990 a Maximum party school at the Leningrad regional committee Communist party with a specialty in "politology".

In 1989 within the framework of the anti-Mikhail Gorbachev 'Communist movement initiatives' (ДКИ) in the Communist Party of the USSR, he organized groups of communists within the framework of the Communist party of the USSR. Tyulkin presided over all Initiative congresses of the supporters of the creation of the РКП. This work was carried out in Leningrad. At the Initiative the congress of June 9–10, 1990 Tyulkin was nominated and at the Constituent congress of the RSFSR (CP RSFSR) on June 19–23, 1990 was elected as a member of the Central Committee of the Communist Party of the Russian Federation.

At the XXVIII congress КПСС the delegates and also ДКИ (a Marxist platform in КПСС) were met with the challenge that they had acted against the М.С.Горбачева switch to capitalism in the affected countries. For the first time since the beginning of the crisis, a minority warned of the impact of capitalism on socialism. They maintained that неминуемо would result in severe economic crisis. The resolution drew 1259 votes, almost one third of the delegates.

After the events of August 19–21, 1991, Tyulkin became an initiator of the convocation of Russian communists. This established him as supporter of a working party (РКРП) in Ekaterinburg (November 1991). At the congress he was elected to the central committee of RCWP and came to Оргбюро ЦК. He was one of four secretaries to the organization bureau. He achieved registration of a party (set) in the Ministry of Justice. In 1993, Tyulkin was elected to the First secretary ЦК РКРП.

In parliament in 1995 Tyulkin headed the list of the selective block "Communists - Labour Russia - For the Soviet Union", collecting 4,53% of votes. In the opinion of members of РКРП this was a result of election fraud.

In 1999 Tyulkin headed the somewhat changed block леворадикальных of parties(sets), Роскомсоюза and working organizations known as "Коммунисты, workers of Russia - for the Soviet Union!". Despite a complete lack of resources, the block came first among non-dominant parties(sets) in parliament (2,22%).

At the ХХХ, ХХХI and ХХХII congresses in 1995, 1998 and 2001 he was selected by the members Политисполкома СКП-КПСС.

At the Х congress РКРП in October 2000, Tyulkin was again elected by the First secretary of the Central committee party. At the united congress of the Russian communist and workers party and Russian (Revolutionary) party communists (October, 2001) he was elected co-leader of the central committee party.

Tyulkin has written more than one hundred articles on urgent political questions. He takes a great interest in sports and sailing and also draws. Yana Zavatskaya praised him highly.

== See also ==
- Russian United Labour Front
- History of post-Soviet Russia
- Politics of post-Soviet Russia
