= Dmitry Vasilenko (politician) =

Russian politician (born 1969)

- Дмитрий Василенко
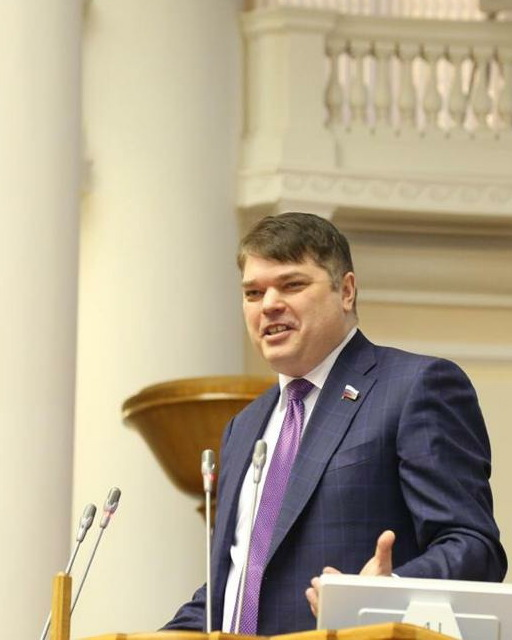

Senator from Leningrad Oblast
- Incumbent
- Assumed office 7 October 2021
- Preceded by: Evgeny Petelin

Personal details
- Born: 11 May 1969 (age 57) Kirishi, Leningrad Oblast, Soviet Union
- Party: United Russia
- Education: St. Petersburg Institute of International Trade, Economics and Law

Dmitry Yuryevich Vasilenko (Russian: Дмитрий Юрьевич Василенко; born 11 May 1969) is a Russian politician serving as a senator from Leningrad Oblast since 7 October 2021.

== Career ==
Dmitry Vasilenko was born on 11 May 1969 in Kirishi, Leningrad Oblast. In 2001, he graduated from the St. Petersburg Institute of International Trade, Economics and Law. From 1996 to 1999, he served as General Director of OAO "Tikhvin Wood Chemical Plant". In 2001, he was appointed mayor of the Shlisselburg. In 2009, he was re-appointed for the same position. From 2012 to 2016, Vasilenko served as the head of the Kirovsky District, Leningrad Oblast. He left the position to become the deputy of the Legislative Assembly of Leningrad Oblast. The same year, he became the senator from Leningrad Oblast. In 2021, he was re-appointed for the same position.

== Sanctions ==
Dmitry Vasilenko is under personal sanctions introduced by the European Union, the United Kingdom, the USA, Canada, Switzerland, Australia, Ukraine, New Zealand, for ratifying the decisions of the "Treaty of Friendship, Cooperation and Mutual Assistance between the Russian Federation and the Donetsk People's Republic and between the Russian Federation and the Luhansk People's Republic" and providing political and economic support for Russia's annexation of Ukrainian territories.
