= St. Petersburg Institute of International Trade, Economics and Law =

Coordinates: 59.9383°N 30.3491°E

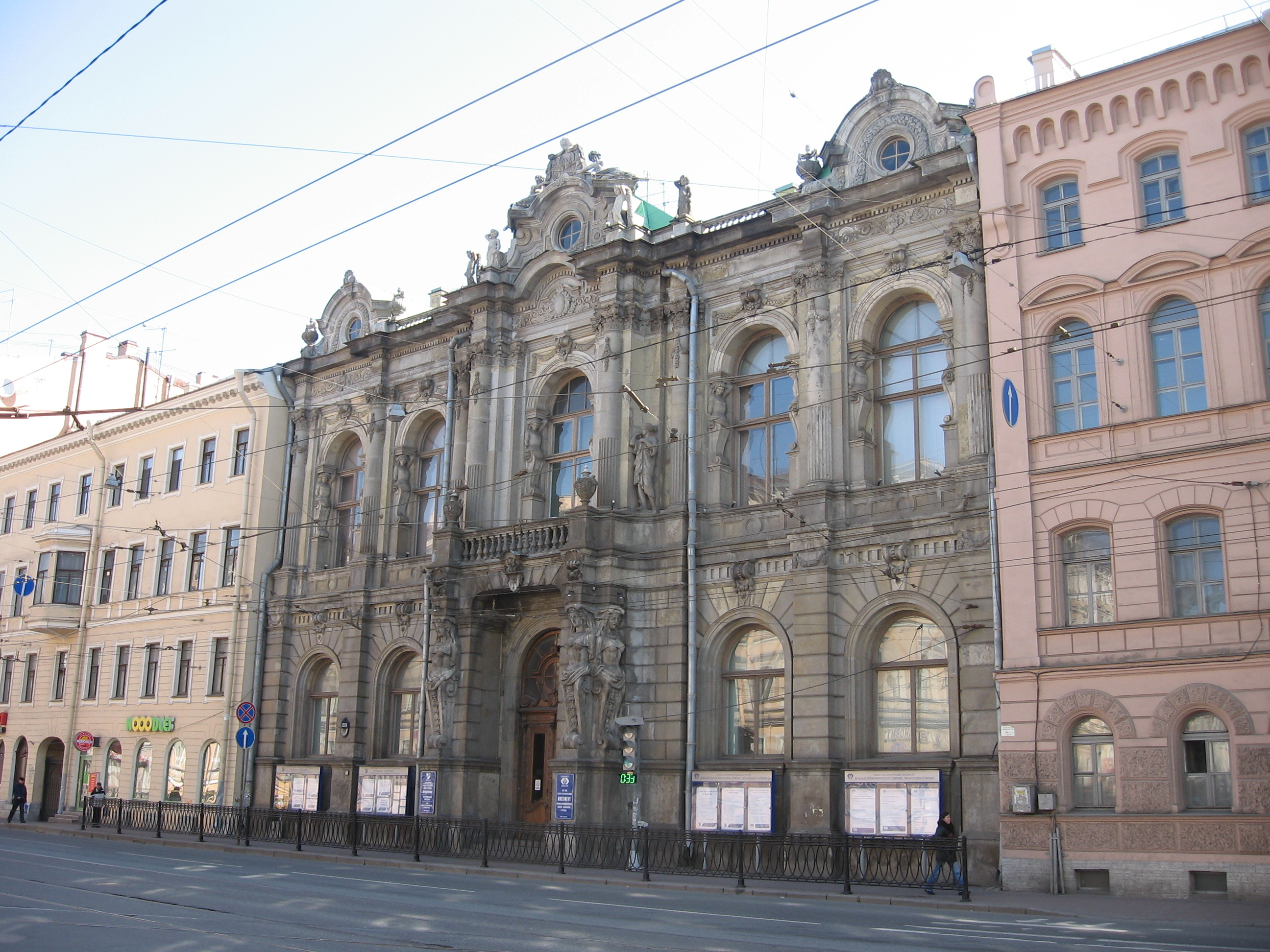
IVESEP's main building

St. Petersburg Institute of International Economic Relations, Economics and Law (IIEREL) – IVESEP (Russian: Институ́т внешнеэкономи́ческих свя́зей, эконо́мики и пра́ва, ИВЭСЭ́П, romanized: Institút vneshneekonomícheskikh svyázey, ekonómiki i práva) is an independent institution of higher education in St. Petersburg, Russia. Established in 1994 by the interregional public organization "ZNANIE Society in St. Petersburg and Leningrad Oblast".

== Overview ==
IVESEP-IIEREL is headquartered in St. Petersburg in a 19th-century palace built for Princess Zinaida Ivanovna Yusupova (42 Liteiny Prospekt). IIEREL is involved in the Bologna process.

== Organisation ==
The Institute consists of six faculties: Economics, Humanities, International Relations, Law, Second Degree, and Part Time Training Department. The faculties train students in finance, world economics, accounting, management, transportation and logistics, public relations, linguistics, psychology, international relations (worldwide organisations), cultural studies (Europe, Baltic region), criminology, public law and public governance.

IIEREL also has several master programmes in law and economics and frequently prepares PhD students for defence of their theses in economics and law.

== Affiliates ==
IVESEP has a wide network of branches in Leningrad Oblast (Boksitogorsk, Gatchina, Kingisepp, Luga, Podporozhye, Volkhov, Vyborg), Moscow and Moscow Oblast (Naro-Fominsk), cities in Russia (Kaliningrad, Khabarovsk, Kirov, Krasnodar, Krasnoyarsk, Novokuznetsk, Novosibirsk, Perm, Togliatti, Smolensk a.o.), as well as abroad — in Armenia's capital Yerevan.
