= Igor Malyarov =

Soviet Russian politician

Igor Olegovich Malyarov (Russian: Игорь Олегович Маляров; 24 July 1965 - 19 September 2003) was a Soviet Russian politician and journalist. From 1993 he was First Secretary of the Russian Young Communist League (RKSM, Komsomol).

Born and died in Moscow. He was born into a family of scientists. He graduated from the MSU Faculty of Economics in 1987.

From 1988 to 1990 he was scientist of the Institute of Asian and African Countries. From 1990 he work at the MSU Faculty of Economics.

He was a member of the Russian Communist Workers' Party of the Communist Party of the Soviet Union (since 1993). He was a member of the Communist Party of the Russian Federation (since 1995). He also was a member of the Communist Party of the Soviet Union.

He criticized Gennady Zyuganov.

He died of pancreatitis at the age of 37 in September 2003.
