= Stalin's ten blows =

Phrase in Soviet historiography

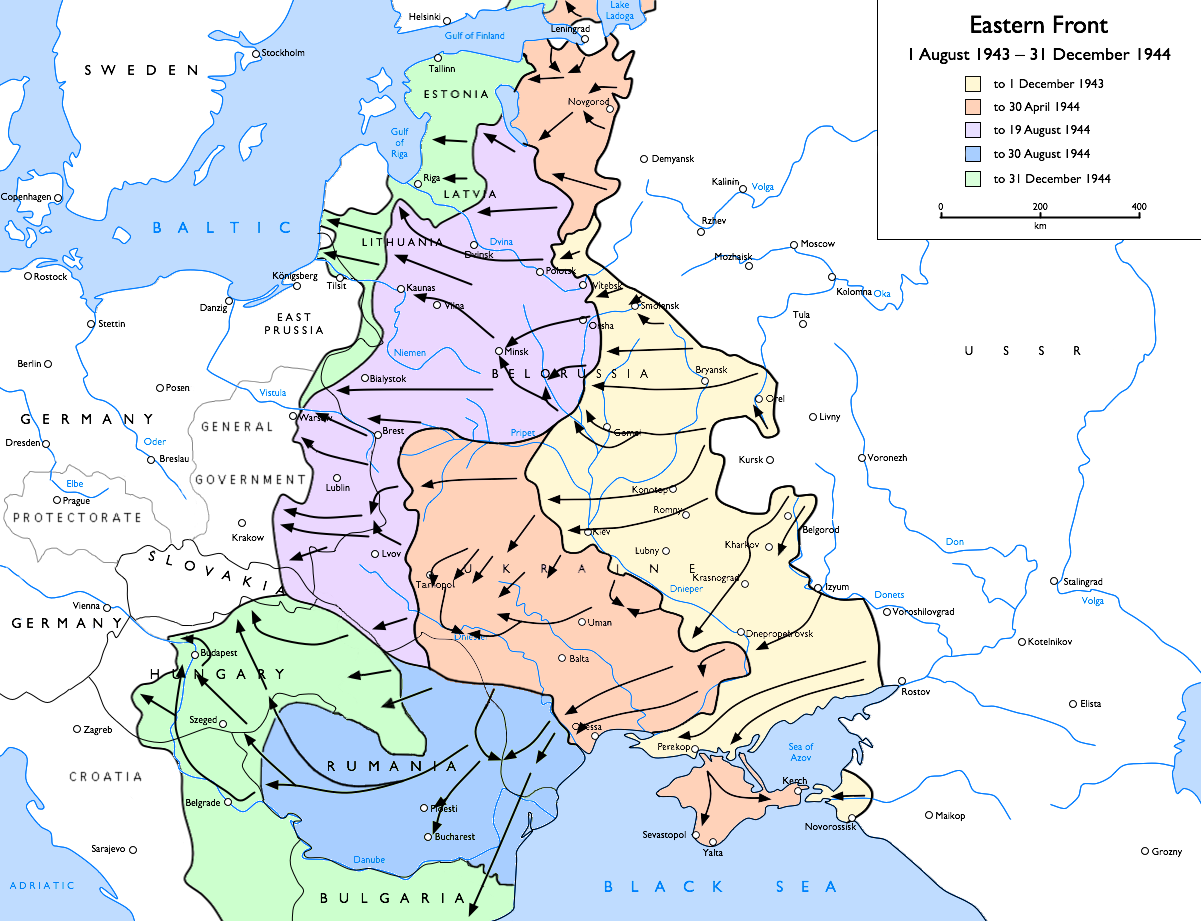
Soviet gains, mid-1943 to end of 1944

In Soviet historiography, Stalin's ten blows (Note: Also "Stalin's ten victories" or the "ten victories of the Red Army".) (Russian: Десять сталинских ударов, romanized: Desyat' stalinskikh udarov) were the ten successful strategic offensives in Europe conducted by the Red Army in 1944 during World War II. The Soviet offensives drove the Axis forces from Soviet territory and precipitated Nazi Germany's collapse.

== History of the expression ==
The term was heard for the first time in November 1944 from Joseph Stalin in his speech "27th anniversary of the Great October socialist revolution" (Russian: «27-я годовщина Великой Октябрьской социалистической революции», romanized: "27-ya godovshchina Velikoy Oktyab'skoy sotsialisticheskoy revolyutsii") during the 1944 meeting of the Moscow's Soviet deputies. The term was coined as a reflection of the Stalin's cult of personality that prevailed in Soviet Union at the time. It did not reflect specific strategic planning of the Stavka, and at times had been called the "Year of twelve victories," based on the order issued by Stalin on the following day, authorizing the firing of artillery salutes with 24 guns in 12 cities of the Soviet Union: Moscow, Leningrad, Kiev, Minsk, Petrozavodsk, Tallinn, Riga, Vilnius, Kishinev, Tbilisi, Sevastopol, and Lvov. Having in his youth enrolled in the Russian Orthodox Theological Seminary in Tiflis, Stalin would have been familiar with the Bible and specifically with the famous Ten Plagues of Egypt, ten massive "blows" which God was said to have inflicted on the evil Pharaoh and leading to Pharaoh's surrender. The term was discontinued in use after Nikita Khrushchev's 1956 Secret Speech denouncing Stalin and ending his cult of personality following his death.

== Background ==
After the collapse of the German Sixth Army at Stalingrad, the Soviet counter-offensives, and the Battle of Kursk later in 1943, it became apparent that the tide of war was turning against Germany. Soviet forces were, all along the front, approaching the pre-war border. Partly because of Führer Directive No. 51, which funneled all new men and materials to the Western Front, to meet the expected Allied invasion, issued on 3 November 1943, Axis forces along the Eastern Front were severely inadequately equipped in comparison to their Soviet opponents, reinforcements were rare, and reserves were stretched thin. Although in this directive Hitler implied that he might be willing to allow withdrawals, trading space for time, this proved to be false. This, combined with Hitler's insistence on holding onto captured territory at all costs, made Soviet victories in 1944 nearly inevitable.

Comparison of German and Soviet forces, January 1944
	Soviet	Axis
Personnel	6,500,000	4,300,000
Tanks	5,600	2,300
Field Guns	90,000	54,000
Aircraft	8,800	3,000

== The offensives ==
1. Leningrad–Novgorod offensive (14 January – 1 March 1944). This, the second chronologically of the offensives, fully relieved the siege of Leningrad, which had started on September 8, 1941. Although the Germans resisted fiercely at first, having had years to prepare defensive rings including pillboxes and minefields around Leningrad, once the initial defenses were broken Soviet forces easily reached the border of Estonia. In Stalin's speech he called it the Lifting of the Leningrad Blockade. It was conducted by the Leningrad Front and the Volkhov Front.
2. Dnieper–Carpathian offensive (24 December 1943 – 17 April 1944). This offensive was launched on Christmas Eve, 1943, the first chronologically of the 1944 offensives, but the second mentioned in Stalin's speech. It involved the clearing of Axis forces from Ukraine. It also resulted in the isolation of the German-controlled Crimea. It was called the Liberation of the Right-Bank Ukraine in Stalin's speech, and involved the 1st, 2nd, 3rd, and 4th Ukrainian Fronts, and the 1st and 2nd Belorussian Fronts.
3. Odessa offensive (26 March 1944 – 14 April 1944) which began the third blow, and the Crimean offensive (8 April - 12 May 1944) which completed it. Even though militarily the Odessa offensive was included in the Dnieper–Carpathian offensive, Stalin grouped it with the Crimean offensive in his speech. This offensive cleared the Crimea of German and Romanian forces, and recaptured Sevastopol. Adolf Hitler had refused to allow Axis forces to evacuate, believing that retention of the Crimea was vital to maintaining Turkish neutrality. The Red Army attacked over the Perekop Isthmus, and quickly drove the German and Romanian forces back to Sevastopol, which surrendered on 9 May. Although Hitler had finally given permission for evacuation, the majority of soldiers were unable to escape in time and surrendered and went into captivity. Due to heavy casualties suffered by the Romanian forces, this battle was a major factor in the Romanian surrender later in 1944. Stalin called it the Liberation of Odessa and Liberation of the Crimea in his speech. It was conducted by the 4th Ukrainian Front.
4. Vyborg–Petrozavodsk offensive (9 June – 9 August 1944). Directed against Finnish forces north of Leningrad, its strategic objective was to drive Finland out of the war by destroying Finnish forces on the Karelian Isthmus and advancing to the Kymi River, whereby Soviet forces would prepare for an advance deep into Finland. It was carried out by the Leningrad Front and the Karelian Front. Soviet forces succeeded in expelling Finnish forces from territory they had gained in 1941, but the Soviet advance was halted at the Battle of Tali-Ihantala. Further north, Finnish victories in the Battles of Vuosalmi and Ilomantsi halted additional Soviet attempts to break through Finnish lines. The Soviet destruction of Finnish forces and advancement to the Kymi River had failed. An unsigned draft document called "The Terms for Finnish Unconditional Surrender" was found in October 1993 in the Russian Foreign Ministry archive, implying that unconditional surrender was indeed the Soviet goal. While the Red Army had failed to achieve all of its objectives, the offensive nonetheless led to Finland agreeing to Soviet peace terms. On 19 September 1944, the Moscow Armistice was signed, ending the Continuation War. Stalin dubbed the operation the Liberation of Karelia-Finland Soviet Republic.
5. Operation Bagration (22 June – 19 August 1944) Started exactly three years after the invasion of the Soviet Union, and named after Pyotr Bagration, a Georgian prince fighting for the Russian Empire during the Napoleonic Wars, this drove the last remaining German forces from Soviet territory, recapturing Belarus. It inflicted extremely heavy casualties upon the German Army Group Center, to the point of being called "The Destruction of Army Group Center," and was undoubtedly one of Germany's worst defeats of the war. Soviet forces advanced past the Bobruisk-Mogilev-Vitebsk line, and nearly reached Warsaw before stopping. Almost 30 German divisions were encircled near Minsk, and the prewar border of East Prussia was reached. Stalin called the operation the Belorussian Operation, and liberation of Lithuania and significant parts of allied Poland, and advance to the borders of Germany. It was conducted by the 1st Baltic Front, and the 1st, 2nd, and 3rd Belorussian Fronts.
6. Lvov–Sandomierz offensive (13 July – 29 August 1944). This offensive to the south of and concurrent to Operation Bagration advanced through Poland and past the Bug River. Although it made little progress at first, eventually it became successful, capturing Brody, Lvov, and Sandomierz. Called the Liberation of western Ukraine and crossing of the Vistula, it was carried out by the 1st Ukrainian Front, and, in conjunction with Operation Bagration, destroyed the German Army Group Centre.
7. Second Jassy–Kishinev offensive (19 August – 14 October 1944). This offensive includes the Second Jassy–Kishinev offensive, from 20 to 29 August, and its follow-ups, which continued well into October. This offensive and its follow-ups were mainly conducted in the Balkans, and were targeted at German and Romanian formations in Army Group South Ukraine. About 15 or 16 German divisions were encircled with several Romanian divisions during the course of the Soviet advance. These operations directly caused the capitulation of Romania and Bulgaria. It decimated the formations of Army Group South Ukraine, and Soviet forces advanced deep into Romania. In Stalin's speech, he referred to it as the Forcing out of the war of Romania and Bulgaria, advancing to the borders of Hungary, and the possibility of offering assistance to allied Yugoslavia. It was carried out by the 2nd and 3rd Ukrainian Fronts.
8. Baltic offensive (14 September – 20 November 1944). Recapturing the Baltic states, including most of Latvia and Estonia, this offensive isolated the Courland Pocket, where 30 divisions of Army Group North were cut off from Army Group Center until the end of the war in Europe. Stalin's speech called the offensive the Liberation of Estonia and Latvia, surrounding of Germans in Courland, and forced exit of Finland from the war. The Leningrad Front and the 1st, 2nd, and 3rd Baltic Fronts carried out this attack.
9. East Carpathian offensive (8 September 1944 – 28 September 1944), Budapest offensive (29 October 1944 – 13 February 1945), and the Belgrade offensive (14 September 1944 – 24 November 1944). These, the final of the 1944 offensives, resulted in the capture of Budapest on 13 February 1945. Budapest was surrounded by Soviet forces on 26 December 1944, and was captured after weeks of brutal street fighting. The three offensives were regarded and planned as a single continuous strategic advance that was also imbued with great political significance due to the participation of the Yugoslav communist forces in its final phase. Stalin called it the Crossing of the Carpathian mountains, liberation of Belgrade and offering of direct help to Czechoslovakia, destruction of the Budapest group of Axis forces, and liberation of Belgrade. It was conducted by the 1st, 2nd, 3rd, and 4th Ukrainian Fronts.
10. Petsamo–Kirkenes offensive (7–29 October 1944). This, the first and only large-scale Arctic military operation started after German forces did not evacuate from Finnish territory by 15 September, as dictated in the terms of the Moscow Armistice. It involved Soviet forces chasing retreating Germans into Norway, and enabled the occupation of the nickel mines in Pechenga, which had been producing metal vital for the German war effort. Stalin called it the Removal of the threat from German forces to the Soviet northern shipping port of Murmansk and entry into Norway. It was conducted primarily by the Karelian Front, with assistance from Soviet naval forces.
