= Leninist Komsomol of the Russian Federation =

Youth organization of the Russian Communist Party

Leninist Communist Youth Union of the Russian Federation Ленинский коммунистический союз молодёжи Российской Федерации
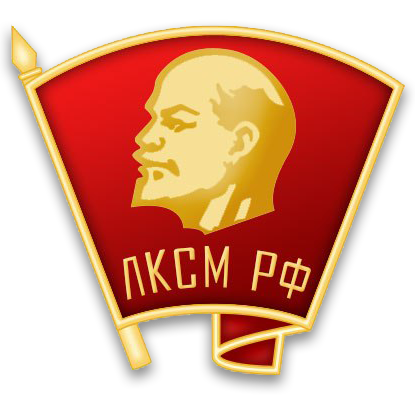
- Secretary General: Vladimir Isakov
- Founded: 1999
- Headquarters: Moscow, Russia
- Membership: 40,000 (2013)
- Ideology: Communism; Marxism–Leninism
- Mother party: Communist Party of the Russian Federation
- International affiliation: WFDY
- Newspaper: Shturm, Komsomolka, Levo Rulya, Plamya (The Flame)
- Website: komsomolrf.ru

The Leninist Communist Youth Union of the Russian Federation (LCYU RF), (Note: Russian: Ленинский коммунистический союз молодёжи Российской Федерации (ЛКСМ РФ), romanized: Leninskij kommunističeskij sojuz molodjoži Rossijskoj Federaciji (LKSM RF)) usually known as the Leninist Komsomol of the Russian Federation, (Note: "Komsomol" being a Russian syllabic abbreviation for Young Communist League) is the youth organization of the Communist Party of the Russian Federation.

Up until February 2011 it was known as the Union of Communist Youth of the Russian Federation (UCY RF). (Note: Russian: Союз коммунистической молодёжи Российской Федерации (СКМ РФ), romanized: Sojuz kommunističeskoj molodjoži Rossijskoj Federaciji (SKM RF))

== History ==
The Leninist Young Communist League traces its origins to the founding of the Soviet Komsomol in 1918. After the dissolution of the Soviet Union in 1991, the Komsomol, having already lost much of its original identity, was disorganized and de facto dissolved. Many socialist and communist youth organizations would emerge from its ruins, many of which would come together to form the Union of Communist Youth in 1999.

In 2003, the public organization "Communists of Petersburg" was created from the former branch of the Union of Communist Youth, and Sergey Malinkovich was elected first secretary of the Communists of Petersburg. The organization, later renamed "Communists of Petersburg and the Leningrad Oblast", gained its main popularity thanks to various outrageous statements and provocative actions.

In 2004, there was an internal conflict within the ranks of the Union of Communist Youth, resulting in a split of two factions, one headed by Yuri Afonin, and the other by Konstantin Zhukov. Afonin's faction represented the overwhelming majority of the organization members and remained tied to the KPRF, while Zhukov's faction became independent and gradually deteriorated into organization without any members, but with the leadership. Both factions kept the same name until February 2011 when the faction headed by Afonin changed name to the Leninist Communist Youth Union of the Russian Federation.

The Leninist Communist Youth Union was a main organization that took part in efforts to organize the 19th World Festival of Youth and Students which took place in October 2017 in Sochi.

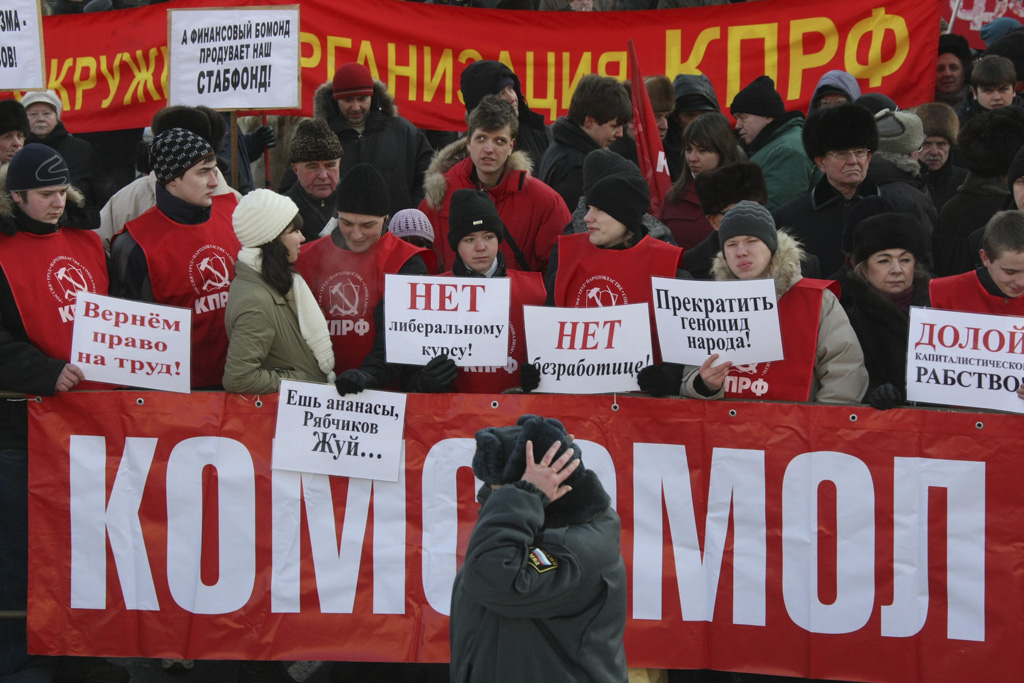
Komsomol at a rally

== Strategic goals ==
- In the economic sphere LKSM stands for a balanced planned and market economy - an important step in building socialism, in which the state has a determining role.
- In the social sphere the organization supports the implementation of national programs aimed at creating a full-fledged social security system, for solving the problems of youth in the area of employment, education, family, and physical and spiritual health.
- LKSM insists on the transition, from currently purely propaganda actions, to real practical steps to create a full-fledged union state with Belarus, as well as the reintegration of former Soviet republics, all-round cooperation with which the most important for the Russian Federation - Ukraine and Kazakhstan.
- LKSM considers it is necessary for drastic measures to eliminate youth crime by addressing its generating socio-economic reasons. At the same time they oppose the horrible conditions in which the accused and convicts serve, most of whom are young people. Punishment shall correct, rather than maim people.

== Activities ==
To reach the objectives of the organization, LKSM leads a variety of activities, such as: Organizing meetings, rallies, demonstrations, picketing with the purpose of expressing an opinion on current societal and youth issues. Participating in election campaigns for the Communist Party, put forward, in collaboration with the Communist Party, its representatives in government bodies at various levels. Developing a network of regional, local and primary LKSM offices. Organizing at the universities: courses, clubs, libraries, studios, summer camps etc.
