= Russian Communist Workers' Party of the Communist Party of the Soviet Union =

Russian Communist Workers' Party of the Communist Party of the Soviet Union Российская коммунистическая рабочая партия в составе Коммунистической партии Советского Союза
- Abbreviation: RCWP-CPSU (English); РКРП-КПСС (Russian)
- Leader: Stepan Malentsov
- Founder: Viktor Tyulkin
- Founded: 27 October 2001 (RCWP-RPC); 21 April 2012 (RCWP-CPSU)
- Merger of: RCWP; RPC; SK
- Headquarters: Saint Petersburg, Russia
- Newspaper: Journal Soviet Union; Labour Russia; Thought
- Youth wing: Revolutionary Communist Youth League (Bolshevik) (2001–2022)
- Membership (2007): 50,000
- Ideology: Communism; Marxism–Leninism; Stalinism; Anti-revisionism
- Political position: Far-left
- International affiliation: IMCWP; World Anti-Imperialist Platform
- Continental affiliation: CPSU (2001)
- Colours: Red
- Slogan: "Workers of the world, unite!" (Russian: "Пролетарии всех стран, соединяйтесь!")
- Anthem: "The Internationale"

Party flag

Website
- ркрп.рус

The Russian Communist Workers' Party of the Communist Party of the Soviet Union (Note: Russian: Российская коммунистическая рабочая партия в составе Коммунистической партии Советского Союза; РКРП-КПСС, romanized: Rossiyskaya kommunisticheskaya rabochaya partiya v sostave Kommunisticheskoy partii Sovetskogo Soyuza; RKRP-KPSS) (RCWP-CPSU) is an anti-revisionist Marxist–Leninist party in Russia. It is considered the Russian branch of the Communist Party of the Soviet Union (2001).

The RCWP-CPSU is led by Viktor Tyulkin, who was co-chairman with Anatolii Kriuchkov until the latter died in 2005). It publishes a newspaper called Trudovaja Rossija (Трудовая Россия; Working People's Russia) and the journal Sovetskij Sojuz (Советский Союз; Soviet Union).

The RCWP-CPSU claims to have supported all the biggest occupations and strikes in Russia. It has links to the Russian trade union Zashchita. As of 2007, it claims about 50,000 members. The Revolutionary Communist Youth League (Bolshevik) (RCYL(B)), the youth organization of the RCWP-CPSU, is considered one of the most active communist youth organizations in Russia.

== History ==
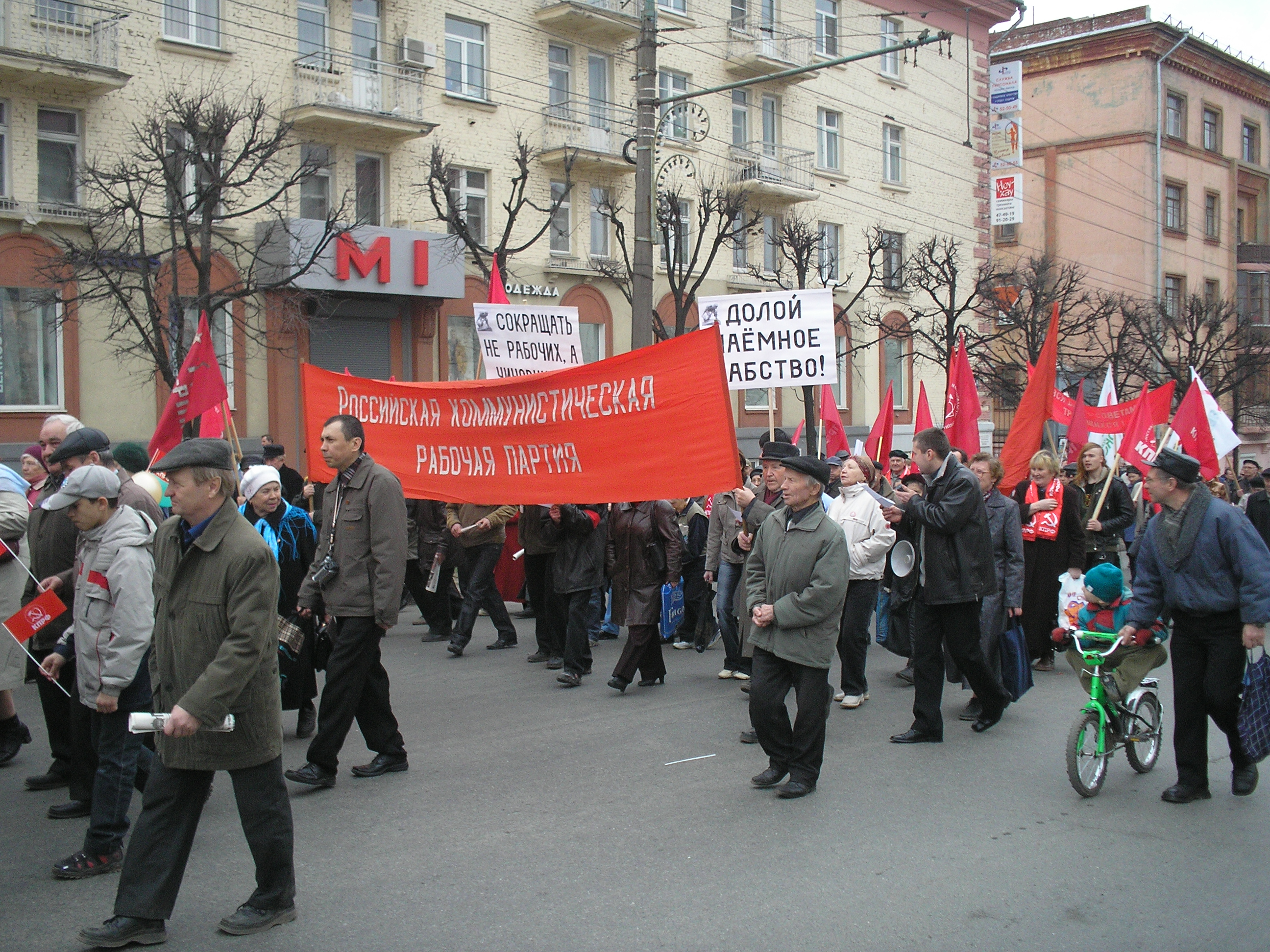
The block of RCWP-CPSU on 1st May demonstration in Izhevsk

The party was established in October 2001 under the name Russian Communist Workers' Party – Revolutionary Party of Communists (Российская Коммунистическая Рабочая Партия – Революционная Партия Коммунистов; abbreviated РКРП-РПК, RKRP-RPK) through the unification of the Russian Communist Workers' Party, the Russian Party of Communists and the Union of Communists with the aim of resurrecting socialism and the Soviet Union.

In the 1999 Duma election, the party won 2.2% of the total vote, getting 1,481,890 votes overall. The RCWP-CPSU considers the Communist Party of the Russian Federation (CPRF) to be reformist, but for the occasion of the 2003 Duma election the party leaders decided to make an agreement with the CPRF in order not to disperse the communist vote.

In 2007, the party was de-registered by the Justice Ministry. In 2010, the RCWP-CPSU co-founded Russian registered political party Russian United Labour Front (ROT Front), which is led by Viktor Tyulkin. In April 2012, the party took its current name.

During the protests following the 2020 Belarusian presidential election, RCWP called on the workers of Belarus not to allow the protests turn into a "Belarusian Maidan on the model of Kiev," referring to 2013–14 Euromaidan protests in Ukraine.

In 2021, Stepan Malentsov was elected the new First Secretary of the Central Committee of the Russian Communist Workers' Party (RCWP-CPSU) as it was decided at the XII (XXII) Congress that took place in Moscow.

=== Positions on the Ukraine Invasion ===
The party supported the recognition of the Donetsk People's Republic and the Luhansk People's Republic by Russia, stating that it is a decision taken "much later than it should have been, but better late than never."

RCWP opposed the 2022 Russian invasion of Ukraine by announcing: "we have no doubts that the true aims of the Russian state in this war are quite imperialistic — to strengthen the position of imperialist Russia in world market competition..." and the party called for an end to "fratricidal conflicts." Later the party said the war had a 'positive component', assessing Russia's actions during the invasion of Ukraine as a fight against fascism and protection of the people of Donbass, yet it still defined the invasion as being imperialism on the part of the Russian Federation.

In 2022, the youth wing of the RCWP, the RCYL(B) split from the party due to the party's support for the ongoing Russo-Ukrainian War.

On 28 September 2023, former members of the RCWP and OKP, who left these parties due to disagreement with the leadership's position on the Ukrainian conflict, issued a joint statement "For the revolutionary renewal of the communist movement in Russia," which proclaimed a course for the creation of a new communist party. They later formed the Russian Communist Party (Internationalists). The founding congress of the RCP(i) was held on 22–23 June 2024.

== See also ==
- List of anti-revisionist groups
