= List of political parties in Russia =

The Russian Federation has a de jure multi-party system, however it operates as a dominant-party system. As of 2026, 5 parties have members in the federal parliament, the State Duma, with one dominant party (United Russia). As of July 2025, 20 political parties are officially registered in the Russian Federation, 17 of which have the right to participate in elections.

== History ==
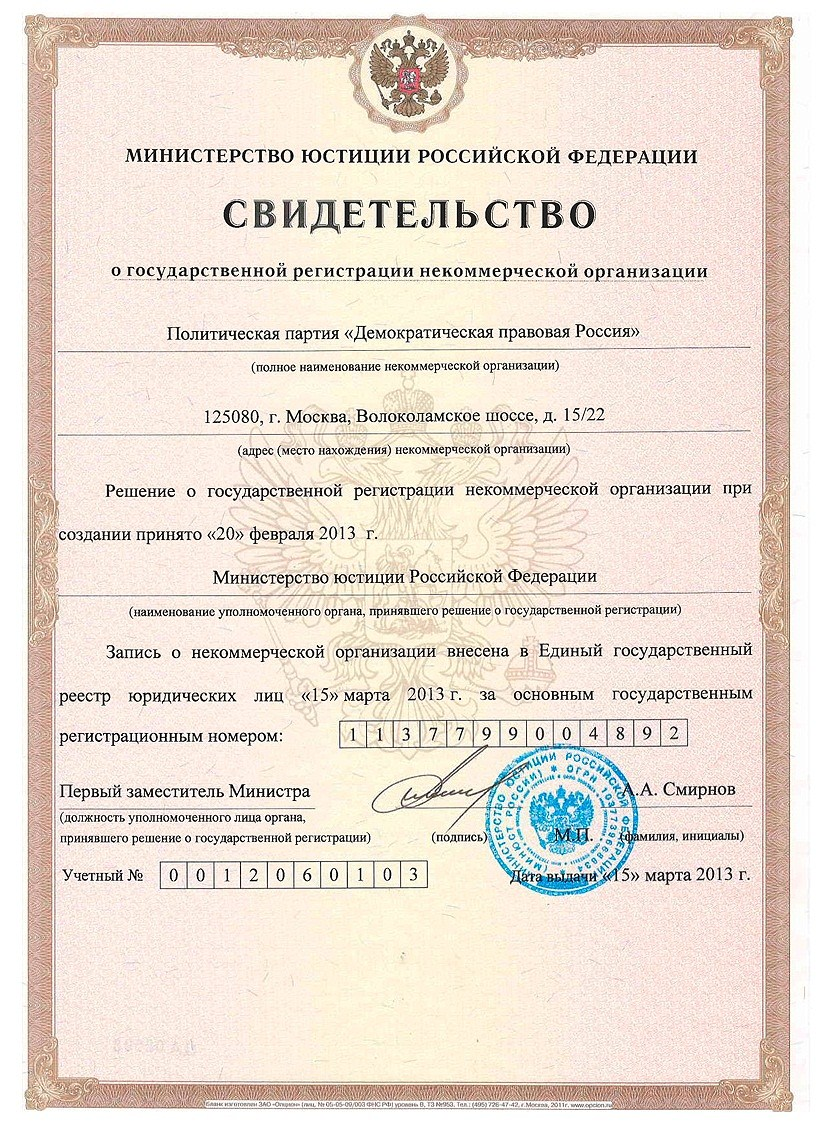
Certificate of state registration of political parties in Russia, issued by the Ministry of Justice of Russia

After the Perestroika reforms in the 1980s Russia had over 100 registered parties, but the people elected to the State Duma represented only a small number of parties. After 2000, during Vladimir Putin's first presidency (2000–2008), the number of parties quickly decreased. From 2008 to 2012 there were only seven parties in Russia, and every new attempt to register new parties was blocked. The last registered party of this period was the government-organized Right Cause (now the Party of Growth) which was registered on 18 February 2009. Before the 2011 parliamentary election, about 10 opposition parties were denied registration.

In 2001, the federal law "On political parties" was adopted. All parties had to be re-registered. Parties have been assigned the status of the only type of public association that has the right to independently nominate candidates for deputies and other elective positions in government bodies. One of the major provisions of the law is the establishment of a single national status of a political party, and, as a result, the liquidation of regional and interregional political public associations. According to paragraph 1 of Article 3 of the Federal Law of the Russian Federation No. 95-FZ "On Political Parties", a political party in Russia is recognized as "a public association created for the purpose of participation of citizens of the Russian Federation in the political life of society through the formation and expression of their political will, participation in public and political actions, in elections and referendums, as well as in order to represent the interests of citizens in state authorities and local governments".

In December 2004, amendments were introduced requiring a minimum number of party members of 50,000 and the presence of more than 45 regional branches of 500 people each. By January 1, 2006, all parties had to submit documents proving that their party structures complied with the requirements of the law on the minimum number of members and the number of regional branches.

In 2009, a bill was introduced to reduce the minimum number of party members from 50,000 to 45,000, and from 500 to 450 members in regional branches. This law came into effect on January 1, 2010. The minimum number of party members was reduced again on January 1, 2012, to 40,000 and to 400 members per regional branch.

On February 28, 2012, an election law was adopted meaning parties were exempted from collecting signatures and making a cash deposit for nominating a party and its candidate, and gubernatorial elections were restored. The number of required signatures for candidates for the presidential elections was reduced from 2 million to 100,000 for party candidates, and 300,000 for self-nominated candidates. The electoral threshold for parties was also reduced from 7% to 5%.

On March 20, 2012, the State Duma approved a presidential bill to reduce the minimum number of political party members from 40,000 to only 500 people, and from 500 to 5 members for a regional branch.

However, after a series of mass protests and a 2011 European Court decision on the case of the Republican Party of Russia (now the People's Freedom Party), the law changed and the number of registered parties quickly increased to more than 48 as of December 2012.

=== Party of Power ===
A "party of power" refers to a political party that has a close relationship with the executive branch of government such that the party appears to function as an extension of the executive rather than as an autonomous political organization. The concept resembles that of a cartel party. These parties are considered by some to have been especially established for support of the incumbent president or prime minister in the Russian parliament:

- Inter-regional Deputies Group/Democratic Russia (1990–1993, Congress of People's Deputies of the Soviet Union/Congress of People's Deputies of Russia/Supreme Soviet of Russia)
- Democratic Choice of Russia (1993–1994)
- Our Home – Russia (1995–1999)
- Unity (1999–2001/2003)
- A Just Russia - For Truth (the second "party of power", supporting Vladimir Putin and opposing United Russia)
- United Russia (2001–present)

== Voter demographics ==
According to studies, United Russia voters in 2007 were younger and more market-oriented than the average voter. The party's electorate includes a substantial share of government employees, pensioners and military personnel, who are dependent on the state for their livelihood. Sixty-four percent of United Russia supporters are female. In the run-up to the 2011 Duma elections, it was reported that support for United Russia was growing among young people.

In April 2023, a survey on the issue of the dissolution of the United Russia Party was conducted among Russians. About 2,500 people participated in the survey, mostly aged 45+. The question was "Is it necessary to dissolve the United Russia party with the inability of its members to participate in political life in the future?" the answers were distributed as follows: 65% stated: "I am for dissolution without permission to participate in political life in the future", 3% stated "I am against dissolution", 6% stated "I am for dissolution, but with permission to participate in political life in the future", and 26% stated "I am for the dissolution of all bourgeois parties".

== Current parties ==
All parties registered with the Ministry of Justice have the right to participate in any elections across the country. A list of registered parties is placed on the Ministry website. In December 2012, there were 48 registered parties in Russia; 7 of them are currently represented in the State Duma as of 2021.

=== Parties represented in the Federal Assembly ===
Party		Est.	Leader	Ideology	State Duma	Federation Council	Regional	Political position	Alliances
ER; ЕР	United Russia; Единая Россия	2001	Dmitry Medvedev	Conservatism; Statism; Russian nationalism	325 / 450	136 / 178	2,683 / 3,908	Big tent	ONF
KPRF; КПРФ	Communist Party of the Russian Federation; Коммунистическая партия Российской Федерации	1993	Gennady Zyuganov	Communism; Marxism–Leninism; Left-conservatism	57 / 450	4 / 178	523 / 3,908	Far-left	UCP–CPSU; International: IMCWP
SR; СР	A Just Russia; Справедливая Россия	2006	Sergey Mironov	Democratic socialism; Social democracy; Social conservatism; Russian nationalism	27 / 450	3 / 178	230 / 3,908	Centre to centre-left	ONF
LDPR; ЛДПР	Liberal Democratic Party of Russia; Либерально-демократическая партия России	1992	Leonid Slutsky	Ultranationalism; Right-wing populism; Social conservatism; Pan-Slavism	23 / 450	3 / 178	239 / 3,908	Right-wing to far-right	
NL; НЛ	New People; Новые люди	2020	Alexey Nechayev	Liberalism; Communitarianism; Regionalism	15 / 450	0 / 178	56 / 3,908	Centre-right	SPPS
Rodina; Родина	Rodina; Родина	2012	Aleksey Zhuravlyov	Ultranationalism; National conservatism; Conservatism; Social conservatism; Right-wing populism	1 / 450	0 / 178	11 / 3,908	Far-right	ONF
GP; ГП	Civic Platform; Гражданская платформа	2012	Rifat Shaykhutdinov	Liberal conservatism; Economic liberalism	1 / 450	0 / 178	5 / 3,908	Centre-right	

=== Parties represented in the regional parliaments ===
Name		Founded	Leader	Ideology	Regional parliaments	Position	Alliances
RPPSJ; РППСС	Russian Party of Pensioners for Social Justice; Российская партия пенсионеров за социальную справедливость	2012	Erik Prazdnikov	Pensioners' interests; Elderly interests; Social justice; Single-issue politics	34 / 3,908	Centre	
CPCR; КПКР	Communist Party "Communists of Russia"; Коммунистическая партия «Коммунисты России»	2012	Maxim Suraykin	Communism; Marxism–Leninism; Stalinism; Anti-revisionism	15 / 3,908	Far-left	International: IMCWP (observer)
Yabloko; Яблоко	Russian United Democratic Party "Yabloko"; Российская объединённая демократическая партия «Яблоко»	1993	Nikolay Rybakov	Social liberalism; Progressivism; Feminism; Pro-Europeanism	11 / 3,908	Centre-left	International: LI; European: EGP (associated faction)
T-NV; Т-НВ	Tatarstan — New Age; Татарстан — новый век	2023	Rinat Zakirov	Tatar nationalism; Environmentalism; Putinism	8 / 3,908	Big Tent	
The Greens; Зелёные	Russian Ecological Party "The Greens"; Российская экологическая партия «Зелёные»	2012	Andrey Nagibin	Green politics; Agrarianism	5 / 3,908	Centre to centre-left	ONF|EAGP
GA! ЗА!	Green Alternative; Зелёная альтернатива	2020	Ruslan Khvostov	Green politics; Environmentalism; Pro-Europeanism	2 / 3,908	Centre-left	
PSP; ПСЗ	Political Party of Social Protection; Политическая партия социальной защиты	2012	Vladimir Mikhailov	Social justice	2 / 3,908	Centre	
PDD; ППД	Party of Direct Democracy; Партия прямой демократии	2020	Oleg Artamonov	Direct democracy; E-democracy	1 / 3,908	Centre-right	

=== Parties in Russian-occupied territories of Ukraine ===
Name		Founded	Leader	Ideology	Location
|	Donetsk Republic; Донецкая республика	2005	Denis Pushilin	Russian nationalism; Donbas separatism	Donetsk People's Republic
	Free Donbas; Свободный Донбасс	2014	Vladimir Medvedev	Russian nationalism; Donbas separatism	Donetsk People's Republic
	Luhansk Economic Union; Луганский экономический союз	2014	Zinaida Nadion	Donbas separatism; Liberal conservatism	Luhansk People's Republic
	New Russia Party; Партия Новороссия	2014	Pavel Gubarev; Ekaterina Gubareva	Russian nationalism; Eurasianism	Donetsk People's Republic Luhansk People's Republic

== List of registered parties ==
№	Full name	Short name	Abbr.	Ideology	Position	Leader(s)	Created	Registration	Last federal elections results		Free access to the next legislative election	Note
№	Full name	Short name	Abbr.	Ideology	Position	Leader(s)	Created	Registration	Presidential	Legislative	Free access to the next legislative election	Note
1	All-Russian political party "United Russia"; Всероссийская политическая партия «Единая Россия»	United Russia	UR; ЕР	Russian conservatism; Statism; Russian nationalism; Putinism	Big tent	Dmitry Medvedev	2001	2003	DNP (endorsed Vladimir Putin)	49.82% (Party list); 45.86% (SMC) (324 seats)	✓	MJ profile CEC profile Website
2	Communist Party of the Russian Federation; Коммунистическая партия Российской Федерации	Communist Party	CPRF; КПРФ	Communism; Marxism–Leninism; Democratic socialism; Soviet patriotism; Neo-Stalinism	Far-left	Gennady Zyuganov	1990	2002	4.37% (Nikolay Kharitonov)	18.93% (Party list); 16.35% (SMC) (57 seats)	✓	MJ profile CEC profile Website
3	LDPR – Liberal Democratic Party of Russia; ЛДПР – Либерально-демократическая партия Россия	Liberal Democratic Party	LDPR; ЛДПР	Russian ultranationalism; Right-wing populism; Social conservatism; Economic interventionism; Pan-Slavism	Right-wing to far-right	Leonid Slutsky	1992	2002	3.24 (Leonid Slutsky)	7.55% (Party list); 5.89% (SMC) (21 seats)	✓	MJ profile CEC profile Website
4	Russian United Democratic Party "Yabloko"; Российская объединённая демократическая партия «Яблоко»	Yabloko; Яблоко		Social liberalism; Progressivism; Feminism; Pro-Europeanism	Centre to centre-left	Nikolay Rybakov	1995	2003	DNP	1.34% (Party list); 1.99% (SMC) (0 seats)	✓	MJ profile CEC profile Website
5	Socialist Political Party "A Just Russia"; Социалистическая политическая партия «Справедливая Россия»	A Just Russia; Справедливая Россия	SR; СР	Social democracy; Democratic socialism; National conservatism; Eurasianism	Centre to centre-left	Sergey Mironov; Zakhar Prilepin	2006	2006	DNP (endorsed Vladimir Putin)	7.46% (Party list); 8.78% (SMC) (27 seats)	✓	MJ profile CEC profile Website
6	Democratic Party of Russia; Политическая партия "Демократическая партия России"	Democratic Party	DPR; ДПР	Conservatism; Populism	Centre-right to right-wing	Alexander Zorin	1990	2012	DNP (endorsed Vladimir Putin)	DNP	✘	MJ profile CEC profile
7	Party of Progress; Партия прогресса	Party of Progress	PP; ПП			Andrey Poda	2012	2012	DNP	DNP	✘	MJ profile CEC profile
8	Russian Party of Freedom and Justice; Российская партия свободы и справедливости	Party of Freedom and Justice	RPFJ; РПСС	Social democracy; Russian nationalism; Patriotism; Federalism	Centre-left	Ilmi Shagan	2012	2012	DNP	0.77% (Party list); 0.68% (SMC) (0 seats)	✘	MJ profile CEC profile
9	Russian Ecological Party "The Greens"; Российская экологическая партия «Зелёные»	REP "The Greens"; РЭП «Зелёные»		Green politics; Agrarianism	Centre	Andrey Nagibin; Alexandra Kudzagova; Sergey Shakhmatov; Rufina Shagapova	1993	2012	DNP (endorsed Vladimir Putin)	0.91% (Party list); 0.98% (SMC) (0 seats)	✓	MJ profile CEC profile Website
10	Communist Party Communists of Russia; Коммунистическая партия Коммунисты России	Communists of Russia	CPCR; КПКР	Communism; Marxism–Leninism; Stalinism; Anti-revisionism	Far-left	Sergey Malinkovich	2009	2012	DNP	1.27% (Party list); 2.98% (SMC) (0 seats)	✓	MJ profile CEC profile Website
11	Political party of Social Protection; Политическая партия социальной защиты	Party of Social Protection	PSP; ПСЗ	Populism		Vladimir Mikhailov	2012	2012	DNP	DNP	✘	MJ profile CEC profile Website
12	Russian Party of Pensioners for Social Justice; Российская партия пенсионеров за социальную справедливость	Party of Pensioners	RPPSJ; РППСС	Pensioners' interests; Elderly interests; Social justice; Single-issue politics	Centre	Erik Prazdnikov	1997	2012	DNP (endorsed Vladimir Putin)	2.45% (Party list); 3.58% (SMC) (0 seats)	✓	MJ profile CEC profile Website
13	Civic Platform; Гражданская платформа	Civic Platform	CP; ГП	Conservatism; Economic liberalism	Right-wing	Rifat Shaykhutdinov	2012	2012	DNP	0.15% (Party list); 0.70% (SMC) (1 seat)	✓	MJ profile CEC profile Website
14	All-Russian political party "Rodina"; Всероссийская политическая партия «Родина»	Rodina; Родина		Russian nationalism; Russian conservatism; National conservatism; Social conservatism; Right-wing populism	Far-right	Aleksey Zhuravlyov	2003	2012	DNP (endorsed Vladimir Putin)	0.80% (Party list); 1.51% (SMC) (1 seat)	✓	MJ profile CEC profile Website
15	Cossack Party of the Russian Federation; Казачья партия Российской Федерации	Cossack Party	CosPRF; КаПРФ	Cossack interests; Christian conservatism	Right-wing	Sergey Kolosok	2013	2013	DNP	DNP	✘	MJ profile CEC profile Website
16	Party of Russia's Rebirth; Партия возрождения России	Party of Russia's Rebirth	PRR; ПВР	Social democracy; Democratic socialism	Centre-left	Igor Ashurbeyli	2002	2013	DNP	DNP	✘	MJ profile CEC profile Website
17	New People; Новые люди	New People	NP; НЛ	Liberalism; Communitarism; Regionalism	Centre to centre-right	Alexey Nechayev	2020	2020	3.90% (Vladislav Davankov)	5.32% (Party list); 4.88% (SMC) (13 seats)	✓	MJ profile CEC profile Website
18	Green Alternative; Зелёная альтернатива	Green Alternative	GA; ЗА	Green politics; Environmentalism; Pro-Europeanism	Centre-left	Ruslan Khvostov	2020	2020	DNP	0.64% (Party list); 0.22% (SMC) (0 seats)	✓	MJ profile CEC profile Website
19	Party of Direct Democracy; Партия прямой демократии	Party of Direct Democracy	PDD; ППД	Direct democracy; E-democracy	Centre to centre-right	Oleg Artamonov	2020	2020	DNP	DNP	✓	MJ profile CEC profile Website

== Historical parties (1991–present) ==
=== Far-left ===
Name	Abbr.	Leader (s)	Ideology	Years active
Confederation of Anarcho-Syndicalists; Конфедерация анархо-синдикалистов	CAS; КАС	Andrey Isaev; Igor Podshivalov; Aleksandr Shubin; Vladlen Tupikin	Anarcho-syndicalism; Syndicalism	1988–1995
Committee for Workers' Democracy and International Socialism; Комитет за рабочую демократию и международный социализм	CWDIS; КРДМС	Sergei Biets	Marxism; Trotskyism	1990–1999; Succeeded by RWP
Party of the Dictatorship of the Proletariat; Партия диктатуры пролетариата	PDP; ПДП	Grigory Isayev	Communism; Proletarian internationalism	1990–2020
Communist Party of the Russian Soviet Federative Socialist Republic; Коммунистическая партия Российской Советской Федеративной Социалистической Республики	CP RSFSR; КП РСФСР	Ivan Polozkov; Valentin Kuptsov	Communism; Marxism–Leninism; Left-wing nationalism	1990–1993 (banned in 1991); Succeeded by CPRF
Russian Communist Workers Party; Российская коммунистическая рабочая партия	RCWP; РКРП	Viktor Anpilov; Viktor Tyulkin	Communism; Marxism–Leninism; Anti-revisionism; Stalinism	1991–2001; Merged into RCWP-RPC
Russian Party of Communists; Российская партия коммунистов Revolutionary Party of Сommunists; Революционная партия коммунистов	RPC; РПК	Anatoly Kryuchkov	Communism; Marxism	1991–2001; Merged into RCWP-RPC
Communists — Labour Russia — For the Soviet Union; Коммунисты — Трудовая Россия — За Советский Союз	KTR; КТР	Viktor Tyulkin; Anatoly Kryuchkov; Viktor Anpilov	Communism; Marxism–Leninism; Anti-revisionism; Soviet patriotism	1995–1999
Stalin Bloc – For the USSR; Сталинский блок — За СССР	SB; СБ	Yevgeny Dzhugashvili; Viktor Anpilov; Stanislav Terekhov	Communism; Stalinism; Marxism-Leninism; Anti-revisionism; Soviet patriotism National Communism	1997–1999
Socialist Resistance; Социалистическое сопротивление	SocSopr; СоцСопр	Collective leadership	Socialism; Trotskyism	1998–2011; Successed by SA
Russian Communist Workers' Party – Revolutionary Party of Communists; Российская коммунистическая рабочая партия – Революционная партия коммунистов	RCWP-RPC; РКРП-РПК	Viktor Tyulkin	Communism; Marxism–Leninism; Anti-revisionism	2001–2007 (officially deregistered)
Pyotr Alexeyev Resistance Movement; Движение сопротивления имени Петра Алексеева	DSPA; ДСПА	Dmitry Zhvania	Socialism; Self-management socialism	2004–2012
All-Russian Communist Party of the Future; Всероссийская коммунистическая партия будущего	VKPB; ВКПБ	Vladimir Tikhonov; Aleksandr Kuvayev	Communism; Marxism–Leninism; Soviet patriotism	2004–2009
Socialist League "Forward"; Социалистическое движение «Вперёд»	SLV; СДВ	Collective leadership	Trotskyism; Eco-socialism; Socialist feminism	2005–2011; Merged into RSM
Interprofessional Workers' Union; Межпрофессиональный союз трудящихся	MPST; МПСТ	Collective leadership	Anarcho-communism; Anarcho-syndicalism	2008–2019
Russian United Labour Front; Российский объединённый трудовой фронт	ROT FRONT; РОТ ФРОНТ	Viktor Tyulkin; Sergei Udaltsov	Communism; Marxism–Leninism; Socialism	2010–2020 (officially deregistered)
Russian Maoist Party Российская маоистская партия	RMP; РМП	Dar Zhutayev	Communism; Marxism–Leninism–Maoism; Anti-revisionism; Proletarian internationalism Marxist feminism	2000

=== Left-wing ===
Name	Abbr.	Leader (s)	Ideology	Years active
Civil United Green Alternative; Гражданская объединённая зелёная альтернатива	GROZA; ГРОЗА	Oleg Mitvol (2009–2012)	Green politics Alter-globalism; Anti-fascism; Social justice	1991–2012
Labour Party (Russia); Партия труда	PT; ПТ	Oleg Smolin	Democratic socialism Syndicalism	1992–1994
Agrarian Party of Russia; Аграрная партия России	APR; АПР	Mikhail Lapshin; Vladimir Plotnikov	Agrarian socialism Collectivist anarchism	1993–2008; Merged into United Russia; Re-founded in 2012
Socialist United Party of Russia; Социалистическая единая партия России	SEPR; СЕПР	Alexey Podberezkin; Ivan Rybkin; Vasily Shestakov	Socialism; Socialist patriotism Christian left	2002–2007; Merged into A Just Russia
Patriots of Russia; Патриоты России	PR; ПР	Gennady Semigin	Democratic socialism Social democracy Left-wing nationalism Soviet patriotism	2005–2021; Merged into SRZP

=== Centre-left ===
Name	Abbr.	Leader (s)	Ideology	Years active
Social Democratic Party of the Russian Federation; Социал-демократическая партия Российской Федерации	SDPR; СДПР	Pavel Kudyukin; Oleg Rumyantsev; Alexander Obolensky (politician)	Social democracy Social liberalism Democratic socialism	1990–2011
Civic Union; Гражданский союз	CU; ГС	Arkady Volsky	Social democracy Anti-Yeltsinism; Federalism	1992–1994
Russian Ecological Party "The Greens"; Российская экологическая партия «Зелёные»	REP "The Greens"; РЭП «Зелёные»	Yevgeny Belyaev (politician); Viktor Danilov-Danilyan; Anatoly Panfilov	Green politics Environmentalism	1992–2008; Merged into A Just Russia; Re-founded in 2012
Russian Party of Social Democracy; Российская партия социальной демократии	RPSD; РПСД	Alexander Yakovlev; Konstantin Titov	Social democracy Liberal democracy	1994–2002; Merged into SDPR
Ivan Rybkin Bloc; Блок Ивана Рыбкина	Rybkin Bloc; Блок Рыбкина	Ivan Rybkin	Social democracy Agrarianism	1995–1995
Trade Unions and Industrialists – Union of Labour; Профсоюзы – Промышленники России – Союз труда	ST; СТ	Vladimir Shcherbakov (politician)	Trade unionism Industrialism	1995–1996
Party of Workers' Self-Government; Партия самоуправления трудящихся	PST; ПСТ	Svyatoslav Fyodorov	Social democracy Social liberalism	1995–2006
Russian United Social Democratic Party; Российская объединённая социал-демократическая партия	RUSDP; РОСДП	Mikhail Gorbachev	Social democracy	2000–2001; Reorganized to SDPR
Party of Russia's Rebirth; Партия возрождения России	PVR; ПВР	Gennady Seleznyov	Social democracy Democratic socialism Humanism; Federalism; Civic nationalism	2000–2008; Merged into Patriots of Russia; Re-founded in 2012
Social Democratic Party of Russia; Социал-демократическая партия России	SDPR; СДПР	Mikhail Gorbachev; Konstantin Titov	Social democracy Democratic socialism	2001–2007; Succeeded by USD
Party of Social Justice; Партия социальной справедливости	PSJ; ПСС	Vladimir Kishenin; Alexey Podberezkin	Democratic socialism Progressivism; Social conservatism	2002–2008; Merged into A Just Russia
Union of Greens of Russia; Союз зелёных России	UGR; СЗР	Alexey Yablokov	Green politics Environmentalism; Civil rights	2004–2006; Merged into Yabloko
Union of Social Democrats; Союз социал-демократов	USD; ССД	Mikhail Gorbachev	Social democracy	2007–2013
Green Alliance; Альянс зелёных	GA; АЗ	Oleg Mitvol; Gleb Fetisov	Grassroots democracy Green politics Social democracy	2012–2019
Social Democratic Party of Russia; Социал-демократическая партия России	SDPR; СДПР	Sirazhdin Ramazanov	Social democracy	2012–2019

=== Centrist ===
Name	Abbr.	Leader (s)	Ideology	Years active
Russian Democratic Reform Movement; Российское движение демократических реформ	RDRM; РДДР	Gavriil Popov; Anatoly Sobchak	Liberal democracy Pro-CIS; Federalism	1992–1995
Dignity and Charity; Достоинство и милосердие	DC; ДМ	Konstantin Frolov; Nikolai Gubenko; Vyacheslav Grishin	Disability rights Federalism	1993–1993
Future of Russia — New Names; Будущее России — Новые имена	BRNI; БРНИ	Vyacheslav Lashchevsky	Youth politics Social policies	1993–1994
Women of Russia; Женщины России	ZhR; ЖР	Alevtina Fedulova; Yekaterina Lakhova	Feminism; Women's rights	1993–1999
Party of Russian Unity and Accord; Партия российского единства и согласия	PRES; ПРЕС	Sergey Shakhray	Reformism	1993–1999; Merged into Unity
Russian Party of Pensioners; Российская партия пенсионеров	RPP; РПП	Sergei Atroshenko; Igor Zotov	Pensioners' interests Elderly interests Social justice Single-issue politics Social conservatism	1997–2007; Merged into A Just Russia; Re-founded in 2012
Fatherland – All Russia; Отечество – Вся Россия	OVR; ОВР	Yury Luzhkov; Yevgeny Primakov	Civic nationalism Social liberalism Regionalism	1998–2002; Merged into United Russia
People's Party of the Russian Federation; Народная партия Российской Федерации	NPRF; НПРФ	Gennady Raikov; Gennady Gudkov	Centrism; Lobbyism	1999–2007; Merged into A Just Russia
Russian Party of Life; Российская партия жизни	RPL; РПЖ	Sergey Mironov	Economic liberalism Third Way; Russian nationalism	2002–2006; Merged into A Just Russia
Union of People for Education and Science; Союз людей за образование и науку	UPES; СЛОН	Vyacheslav Igrunov	Social liberalism Support of science and education	2002–2007
Civilian Power; Гражданская сила	GS; ГС	Alexander Ryavkin; Mikhail Barshchevsky	Green politics	2002–2008; Merged into Right Cause; 2012–2025
Committee 2008: A Free Choice; Комитет 2008: Свободный выбор	Committee 2008; Комитет 2008	Garry Kasparov	Liberalism; Liberal democracy	2004–2005; Succeeded by The Other Russia
Russian Democratic Party "Our Choice"; Российская демократическая партия «Наш выбор»	Our Choice; Наш выбор	Irina Khakamada	Liberalism; Social liberalism	2004–2006; Merged into RNDS
Yabloko-United Democrats; Яблоко — Объединённые демократы	Yabloko-UD; Яблоко-ОД	Ivan Novitsky	Social liberalism Liberal conservatism Green politics Pro-Europeanism	2005–2005
Russian People's Democratic Union; Российский народно-демократический союз	RNDS; РНДС	Mikhail Kasyanov	Liberalism	2006–2012; Merged into RPR–PARNAS
The Other Russia; Другая Россия	DR; ДР	Garry Kasparov; Eduard Limonov; Mikhail Kasyanov	Big tent Liberal democracy National democracy Social democracy Social liberalism Civic nationalism National bolshevism	2006–2010
Independent Democratic Party of Russia; Независимая демократическая партия России	IDPR; НДПР	Mikhail Gorbachev; Alexander Lebedev	Liberalism; Social liberalism	2008–2014/16
People's Freedom Party "For Russia without Lawlessness and Corruption"; Партия народной свободы «За Россию без произвола и коррупции»	PARNAS; ПАРНАС	Mikhail Kasyanov; Vladimir Milov; Boris Nemtsov; Vladimir Ryzhkov	Liberalism; Liberal democracy Anti-corruption	2010–2012; Succeeded by RPR–PARNAS
People's Party of Russia; Народная партия России	PPR; НПР	Andrei Bogdanov; Stanislav Aranovich	Centrism; Populism; Anarchism (factions)	2012–2019
Agrarian Party of Russia; Аграрная партия России	APR; АПР	Olga Bashmachnikova	Agrarianism; Agricultural policy Centrism	2012–2019
Party of Pensioners of Russia; Партия пенсионеров России	PPR; ППР	Valery Ryazansky; Nikolay Chebotarev	Pensioners' interests	2012–2019
Party of Good Deeds	PDD; ПДД	Andrey Kirillov	Populism; Environmentalism	2014–2022

=== Centre-right ===
Name	Abbr.	Leader (s)	Ideology	Years active
Democratic Union; Демократический союз	DU; ДС	Valeriya Novodvorskaya	Liberalism; Classical liberalism Reformism; Anti-communism; Anti-fascism; Atlanticism	1988–2014
Conservative Party of Russia; Консервативная партия России	CPR; КПР	Lev Ubozhko	Conservatism; Liberal conservatism Anti-communism	1989–2005
Peasant Party of Russia; Крестьянская партия России	KPR; КПР	Yuri Chernichenko	Liberalism; Agrarianism; Anti-communism	1990–1999
Russian Christian Democratic Party; Российская христианско-демократическая партия	RCDP; РХДП	Alexander Chuev	Christian democracy Conservatism	1990–2002
People's Freedom Party; Партия народной свободы	PARNAS; ПАРНАС	Mikhail Kasyanov	Republicanism; Anti-Putinism; Liberalism; Conservative liberalism Federalism; Atlanticism; Anti-communism; Pro-Europeanism; Nemtsovism	1990–2023
Party of Economic Freedom; Партия экономической свободы	PEF; ПЭС	Konstantin Borovoy	Liberalism; Neoconservatism; Economic liberalism	1992–2003; Merged into SPS
Democratic Choice of Russia; Демократический выбор России	DVR; ДВР	Yegor Gaidar	Liberalism; Conservative liberalism Liberal conservatism Economic liberalism	1993–2001; Merged into SPS
Forward, Russia! Вперёд, Россия!	FR; ВР	Boris Fyodorov	Liberal democracy Liberal conservatism Patriotism; Conservatism	1995–2002; Merged into RPR
Our Home – Russia; Наш дом — Россия	NDR; НДР	Viktor Chernomyrdin	Liberalism; Liberal conservatism Fiscal conservatism	1995–2006; Merged into United Russia
Democratic Choice of Russia – United Democrats; Демократический выбор России — Объединенные демократы	DVR-OD; ДВР-ОД	Yegor Gaidar	Liberal conservatism Anti-communism	1995–1995
Union of Right Forces; Союз правых сил	SPS; СПС	Sergey Kiriyenko; Boris Nemtsov; Nikita Belykh; Leonid Gozman	Liberal conservatism Conservative liberalism Neoliberalism; Economic liberalism Pro-Europeanism	1999–2008; Succeeded by Right Cause
Liberal Russia; Либеральная Россия	LR; ЛР	Boris Zolotukhin; Sergei Yushenkov; Boris Berezovsky	Liberalism; Liberal conservatism	2000–2004
New Course — Automobile Russia; Новый курс — Автомобильная Россия	NCAR; НКАР	Viktor Pokhmelkin; Boris Fyodorov; Leonid Olshansky	Liberalism; Liberal conservatism Drivers' rights Anti-militarism	2003–2003
People's Party "For Women of Russia"; Народная партия «За женщин России»	NPZZhR; НПЗЖР	Galina Latysheva; Galina Khavraeva	Women's rights Conservatism; Neoconservatism; Single-issue party	2007–2019
Right Cause; Правое дело	PD; ПД	Boris Titov; Mikhail Prokhorov; Leonid Gozman; Georgy Bovt	Liberal conservatism Conservative liberalism Economic liberalism Pro-Europeanism in 2012-2016: National democracy National patriotism	2008–2016; Succeeded by Party of Growth
Western Choice; Западный выбор		Konstantin Borovoi	Liberalism; Liberal democracy Libertarianism; Anti-communism; Pro-Europeanism; Atlanticism	2013–2014
Civic Initiative; Гражданская инициатива	GRANI	Andrey Nechayev	Liberalism; Conservative liberalism	2013–2025
Party of Growth; Партия роста	PR; ПР	Boris Titov	Liberal conservatism Conservative liberalism Economic liberalism	2016–2024

=== Right-wing ===
Name	Abbr.	Leader (s)	Ideology	Years active
Constitutional Democratic Party – Party of Popular Freedom; Конституционно-демократическая партия – Партия народной свободы	KDP-PNS; КДП-ПНС	Mikhail Astafyev; Sergei Rogozin	Russian nationalism National conservatism Constitutionalism; Anti-Yeltsinism	1991–2001; Merged into People's Will; Re-founded in 2008
Russian All-People's Union; Российский общенародный союз	ROS; РОС	Sergey Baburin	National conservatism Russian nationalism Pochvennichestvo; Right-wing socialism Social conservatism	1991–2001; Merged into People's Will; Re-founded in 2008, Dissolved in 2025
Congress of Russian Communities; Конгресс русских общин	CRC; КРО	Dmitry Rogozin; Alexander Lebed; Yury Skokov	Russian nationalism National conservatism Traditionalism	1992–2004; Merged into Rodina in 2004; Re-founded in 2006; Merged into Rodina in 2012
Popular Patriotic Party; Народно-патриотическая партия	NPP; НПП	Alexander Kotenev; Anatoly Gil	Russian nationalism Social conservatism Veterans of Afghan war' interests Yeltsinism	1992–1999; Merged into Unity
Social Patriotic Movement "Power"; Социал-патриотическое движение «Держава»	Derzhava; Держава	Alexander Rutskoy; Konstantin Zatulin	Russian nationalism Social conservatism Patriotism; Social patriotism Right-wing populism Pan-Slavism	1995–1999; Merged into OVR
Power to the People! Власть — народу!	VN; ВН	Nikolai Ryzhkov; Sergey Baburin; Yelena Shuvalova	Patriotism; Social conservatism Pochvennichestvo; Right-wing socialism	1995–1995
People's Republican Party of Russia; Народно-республиканская партия России	NRPR; НРПР	Alexander Lebed; Vladimir Kushnerenko	National conservatism Social conservatism Third way Statism	1995–2007
Russian Socialist Party; Русская социалистическая партия	RSP; РСП	Vladimir Bryntsalov	Moderate conservatism Traditionalism; Social conservatism	1996–2001; Merged into United Russia
Inter-Regional Movement "Unity"; Межрегиональное движение "Единство"	Unity; Единство	Sergey Shoygu; Vladimir Putin	Conservatism; Fiscal conservatism Russian nationalism Centrism (officially)	1999–2001; Reorganized to United Russia
People's Union; Народный союз Party of National Revival "People's Will"; Партия национального возрождения «Народная Воля»	NS; НС; Narodnaya Volya; Народная Воля	Sergey Baburin	Russian nationalism Conservatism; National conservatism Social conservatism Pochvennichestvo; Patriotism	2001–2008; Successed by ROS
For a Holy RussiaЗа Русь святую	ZRS; ЗРС	Sergei Popov (politician, born 1960)	Christian patriorism Conservatism; Social conservatism Right-wing socialism Patriotism	2002–2005
Monarchist Party of Russia; Монархическая партия России	MPR; МПР	Anton Bakov; Karl Emich of Leiningen	Restoration of the Russian monarchy Constitutional monarchism Russian conservatism	2012–Present
Great Fatherland Party; Партия Великое Отечество	PVO; ПВО	Nikolai Starikov	Conservatism; National conservatism Russian nationalism Centrism	2013–2020

=== Far-right ===
Name	Abbr.	Leader (s)	Ideology	Years active
National Patriotic Front "Memory"; Национально-патриотический фронт «Память»	Pamyat; Память	Dmitri Vasilyev	Russian nationalism Traditionalism; Orthodox fundamentalism Orthodox nationalism National conservatism Tsarism; Antisemitism	1980–2021
National Republican Party of Russia; Национально-республиканская партия России	NRPR; НРПР	Nikolay Lysenko (politician)	Russian ultranationalism Mono-national state Anti-internationalism; Anti-cosmopolitanism; Anti-communism	1990–1998
Russian National Unity; Русское национальное единство	RNU; РНЕ	Alexander Barkashov	Neo-Nazism; Russian nationalism Antisemitism; Islamophobia; Anti-immigration; Anti-communism; Third Position	1990–2000
Russian All-National Union; Русский общенациональный союз	RONS; РОНС	Igor Artemov	Russian ultranationalism Orthodox nationalism Christian fundamentalism National capitalism White nationalism Anti-communism; Anti-Sovietism; Antisemitism; Anti-LGBT; Pan-Slavism	1990–2011
People's Liberation Movement "Ours"; Народно-освободительное движение «Наши»	Nashi; Наши	Alexander Nevzorov	Russian nationalism Soviet nationalism Statism; Chauvinism	1991–1993
Russian Party; Русская партия	RP; РП	Viktor Korchagin; Vladimir Miloserdov	Russian ultranationalism Russian irredentism Antisemitism; Economic liberalism Anti-Christianity	1991–1997
Front of National Revolutionary Action; Фронт национал-революционного действия	FNRD; ФНРД	Ilya Lazarenko	Russian ultranationalism Revolutionary nationalism Neo-Fascism; Neo-Nazism; Strasserism; Antisemitism; Russian imperialism Orthodox fundamentalism	1991–1999
Oprichny Dvor; Опричный двор National Socialist Russian Workers' Party; Национал-социалистическая русская рабочая партия	Oprichniks; Опричники; NSRWP; НСРРП	Mikhail Glukhov	Russian ultranationalism Neo-fascism; Neo-Nazism; Anti-Americanism; Anti-Turkism; Anti-communism	1993–1997
Russian National Union; Русский национальный союз Russian National Socialist Party; Русская национальная социалистическая партия	RNU; РНС; RNSP; РНСП	Konstantin Kasimovsky	Neo-Nazism; White power Racism; Antisemitism; Anti-caucasian; Orthodox nationalism	1993–1999 (RNU); 1999–2007 (RNSP)
Freedom Party (Russia); Партия свободы	PS; ПС	Yuri Belyaev (politician)	Russian ultranationalism Neo-nazism; Neo-fascism; White nationalism Anti-immigration; Anti-democracy; Antisemitism; Anti-communism	1994–2009
People's National Party; Народная национальная партия	PNP; ННП	Aleksandr Ivanov-Sukharevsky	Russian ultranationalism Neo-fascism; Neo-Nazism; White nationalism Racism; Antisemitism; Statism	1994–2009
Slavic Union; Славянский союз	SS; СС	Dmitry Demushkin	Neo-Nazism; White supremacism Pan-Slavism; Anti-communism; Xenophobia; Antisemitism; Anti-LGBT	1999–2010
Conceptual Party "Unity"; Концептуальная партия «Единение»	CPU; КПЕ	Konstantin Petrov	Social Security Conception of Dead Water; Conspiracy theory Occultism; Neopaganism; Neo-Stalinism antisemitism Anti-communism; Anti-Christianity; Anti-Western sentiment	2000–2007
New Russian National Unity; Новое Русское национальное единство	VOPD RNU; ВОПД РНЕ	Mikhail Lalochkin; Yevgeny Lalochkin	Neo-Nazism; Russian ultranationalism Monarchism; Orthodox nationalism Xenophobia	2000–2013
National Sovereignty Party of Russia; Национально-державная партия России	NDPR; НДПР	Alexander Sevastyanov; Stanislav Terekhov	Russian nationalism Ethnic nationalism Antisemitism	2002–2017
Movement Against Illegal Immigration; Движение против нелегальной иммиграции	DPNI; ДПНИ	Vladimir Basmanov; Alexander Belov; Vladimir Yermolayev	Russian nationalism Ethnic nationalism Anti-immigration; Xenophobia; Anti-Islam	2002–2011
National Socialist Society; Национал-социалистическое общество	NSO; НСО	Political Council	Neo-Nazism; Neo-fascism; Russian ultranationalism	2004–2010
Northern Brotherhood; Северное братство	NB; СБ	Pyotr Khomyakov	Russian ultranationalism Revolutionary nationalism Ethnic nationalism Russian separatism Neo-Nazism; Anti-immigration; Anti-caucasian; Antisemitism; Nordicism	2006–2012
People's Militia named after Minin and Pozharsky; Народное ополчение имени Минина и Пожарского	NOMP; НОМП	Vladimir Kvachkov	Russian nationalism Ultranationalism; Antisemitism; Militarism; Orthodox nationalism Soviet patriotism	2009–2015
Ethno-political Association "Russians"; Этнополитическое объединение «Русские»	Russians; Русские	Dmitry Demushkin; Alexander Belov	Russian nationalism Ethnic nationalism Anti-immigration	2011–2015
Nation and Freedom Committee; Комитет «Нация и свобода»	NFC; КНС	Vladimir Basmanov	Russian ultranationalism Anti-communism; Anti-immigration; European nationalism Pan-Slavism	2014–2020
Male State; Мужское государство	MG; МГ	Vladislav Pozdnjakov	National patriarchy Russian ultranationalism Antifeminism; Homophobia; Anti-immigration	2016–2020

=== Syncretic ===
Name	Abbr.	Leader (s)	Ideology	Years active
National Salvation Front; Фронт национального спасения	NSF; ФНС	Collective leadership	Statism; National patriotism Russian nationalism Left-wing nationalism Soviet patriotism Anti-Yeltsinism	1992–1994 (banned in 1993)
National Bolshevik Party; Национал-большевистская партия	NBP; НБП	Eduard Limonov	National Bolshevism; Russian nationalism Neo-Sovietism; Russian irredentism Anti-Western sentiment	1993–2007; Succeeded by The Other Russia
Beer Lovers Party; Партия любителей пива	BLP; ПЛП	Dmitry Shestakov; Konstantin Kalachev	Joke party Patriotism; Protectionism; Environmentalism; Anti-establishment	1993–1998
Spiritual Heritage; Духовное наследие	SH; ДН	Alexey Podberezkin	Russian nationalism Moderate nationalism Patriotism; Statism	1995–2002
Party of Peace and Unity; Партия мира и единства	PME; ПМЕ	Sazhi Umalatova	Internationalism; Eurasianism; Putinism; Anti-Americanism; Soviet nationalism	1996–2008; Merged into Patriots of Russia; Re-founded in 2012
People's Patriotic Union of Russia; Народно-патриотический союз России	NPSR; НПСР	Gennady Zyuganov; Gennady Semigin	Patriotism; Nationalism; Statism; Soviet patriotism	1996–2010; Merged into Patriots of Russia
People's Will Army; Армия воли народа For Responsible Government; За ответственную власть	AVN; АВН; ZOV; ЗОВ	Yury Mukhin	Delocracy; Russian nationalism National democracy Left-wing nationalism Anti-Bureaucracy; Neo-Stalinism antisemitism	1997–2011; 2011–2015
National Patriotic Union "Rodina"; Народно-патриотический союз «Родина»	NPS "Rodina"; НПС «Родина»	Dmitry Rogozin; Sergey Glazyev; Yury Skokov	Russian patriotism Social democracy Protectionism; Economic nationalism	2003–2006; Merged into A Just Russia; Re-founded in 2012
National Bolshevik Front; Национал-большевистский фронт	NBF; НБФ	Alexei Golubovich; Maksim Shurkin	National Bolshevism; Eurasianism; Anti-Limonov tendency Russian ultranationalism Revolutionary socialism Left-wing nationalism Anti-liberalism; Factions: Strasserism; Antisemitism; Ethnocentrism	2006–2016
Interregional Social Movement "Artpodgotovka"; Межрегиональное общественное движение «Артподготовка»	Artpodgotovka; Артподготовка	Vyacheslav Maltsev	Populism; National democracy Russian nationalism Left-wing nationalism Socialism; Anti-communism; Liberalism; Direct democracy	2013–2017
For Truth; За правду	ZP; ЗП	Zakhar Prilepin	National conservatism Paternalistic conservatism Russian nationalism Anti-liberalism; Authoritarian capitalism National patriotism Hard euroscepticism	2020–2021; Merged into SRZP

=== Regionalist parties ===
Name	Abbr.	Leader (s)	Ideology	Political position	Years active
Adyghe Hase; Адыгэ Хасэ	AH; АГ	Abubachir Skhalyakho; Musa Shanibov; Zaurbiy Naloyev; Musa Psikhomakhov	Circassian nationalism	Big tent	1988–present (Adygea, Krasnodar Krai); 1988–1993 (Kabardino-Balkaria); 1989–1995 (Karachay-Cherkessia)
Nijsxo; Нийсхо	N Н	Issa Dashlakiyev	Ingush nationalism	Big tent	1988–present (unregistered)
Khostug Tyva; Свободная Тува; Хостуг Тыва	KhT; СТ; ХТ	Kaadyr-ool Bicheldey	Tuvan nationalism Anti-communism; Anti-Russian sentiment Pan-Turkism	Big tent	1989–?
Sakha Omuk; Саха Омук	SO; СО	Andrei Borisov	Yakut nationalism Anti-communism; Pan-Turkism	Big tent	1990–1994
Vainakh Democratic Party; Вайнахская демократическая партия Вайнехан Демократан Цхьанкхетаралла	VDP; ВДП; ВДЦ	Zelimkhan Yandarbiev	Chechen separatism Chechen nationalism Anti-communism	Big tent	1990–1993
Buryat-Mongolian People's Party; Бурят-Монгольская народная партия Буряад-Монгол Арадай Нам	BMPP; БМНП; БМАН	Mikhail Ochirov	Buryat nationalism Pan-Mongolism; Anti-communism	Big tent	1990–1997
Communist Party of the Republic of Tatarstan; Коммунистическая партия Республики Татарстан; Татарстан Республикасы коммунистлар партиясе	CPRT; КПРТ; ТРКП	Robert Sadykov; Alexander Saliy	Communism; Marxism–Leninism	Far-left	1991–2002; Merged into CPRF
Union for the National Revival of Alania; Союз национального возрождения Алании	UNRA; СНВА	Aleksandr Ramonov	National Bolshevism; Ossetian nationalism Soviet patriotism	Far-left	1991–?
Fatherland Socialist Party; Отечество; Фыдыбӕстӕ	F О Ф	Vadim Baskayev	Socialism; Ossetian nationalism Anti-Ingush sentiment	Left-wing	1993–2004
Styr Nyxas; Стыр Ныхас	SN; СН	Mikhail Gioyev	Ossetian nationalism Styr Nyxas; Anti-Ingush sentiment Anti-militarism		1993–?
Baltic Republican Party; Балтийская республиканская партия	BRP; БРП	Sergei Pasko; Rustam Vasiliev	Kaliningrad independence Kaliningrad autonomism Social liberalism Pro-Europeanism; Anti-communism	Centre-right	1993–2005
Mari National Rebirth Party "Ushem"; Марийская партия национального возрождения "Ушем"	Ushem; Ушем	Vladimir Kozlov	Mari nationalism	Big tent	1917–1918 (banned); 1989–?
Russian Unity; Русское единство Руська єдність	RE; РЕ; РЄ	Maksym Kovalenko; Sergey Aksyonov	Russian nationalism Russian irredentism Russophilia; Crimean regionalism	Right-wing	2008–2014; Merged into United Russia

== Soviet parties (1917–1991) ==
=== CPSU and factions ===
Name	Abbr.	Leader(s)	Ideology	Political position	Years active
Sole legal party (before 1990)
Communist Party of the Soviet Union; Коммунистическая партия Советского Союза	CPSU; КПСС	Vladimir Lenin; Joseph Stalin; Georgy Malenkov; Nikita Khrushchev; Leonid Brezhnev; Yuri Andropov; Konstantin Chernenko; Mikhail Gorbachev; Vladimir Ivashko	Communism; Marxism–Leninism	Far-left	1917–1991
Factions inside the RKP(b), VKP(b) and CPSU
Left Communists; Левые коммунисты		Nikolai Bukharin	Left communism World revolution		1918–1921
Group of Democratic Centralism; Группа демократического централизма		Valerian Obolensky; Timofei Sapronov; Vladimir Smirnov; Andrei Bubnov; Yakov Drobnis	Left communism Democratic centralism		1919–1923
Workers' Opposition; Рабочая оппозиция		Alexander Shliapnikov; Sergei Medvedev; Alexandra Kollontai; Yury Lutovinov	Trade unionism Council communism Anti-bureaucratism		1920–1922
Workers' Truth; Рабочая правда		Fanya Shutskever; Efim Shulman; Vladimir Khaikevich; Yakov Budnitsky; Pauline Lass-Kozlova; Oleg Vikman-Beleev; Nellie Krym	Anti-bureaucratism		1921–1923
Right Opposition; Правая оппозиция		Nikolai Bukharin; Alexei Rykov; Mikhail Tomsky	Agrarian socialism Anti-Stalinism; New Economic Policy; Anti-Collectivization		1921–1933
Left Opposition; Левая оппозиция		Leon Trotsky	Trotskyism; Anti-Stalinism; Industrialism		1923–1927
Workers Group of the Russian Communist Party; Рабочая группа Российской коммунистической партии		Gavril Myasnikov	Left communism Anti-bureaucratism; Workplace democracy		1923–1930
United Opposition; Объединённая оппозиция		Leon Trotsky; Grigory Zinoviev; Lev Kamenev	Anti-New Economic Policy; Anti-Stalinism; Industrialism		1926–1933
Left-Right Bloc; Право-левый блок		Vissarion Lominadze; Sergey Syrtsov; Jan Sten	Anti-Stalinism; Anti-Collectivization		1929–1933
Union of Marxist-Leninists; Союз марксистов-ленинцев		Martemyan Ryutin; Vasily Kayurov	Anti-Stalinism		1932–1932
Bloc of Oppositions; Блок оппозиции		Leon Trotsky; Leon Sedov	Trotskyism; Anti-Stalinism		1932–1933
Anti-Party Group of Malenkov, Kaganovich, Molotov and Shepilov, who joined them Антипартийная группа Маленкова, Кагановича, Молотова и примкнувшего к ним Шепилова		Georgy Malenkov; Lazar Kaganovich; Vyacheslav Molotov; Dmitri Shepilov	Anti-Khrushchevism; Anti-De-Stalinization		1957–1957
Bolshevik Platform; Большевистская платформа		Nina Andreyeva	Anti-Perestroika; Neo-Stalinism; Anti-liberalism		1988–1991; Succeeded by VKPB
United Workers' Front; Объединённый фронт трудящихся		Viktor Stepanov; Mikhail Popov; Igor Malyarov	Soviet patriotism Proletarian internationalism Anti-separatism		1989–1991; Succeeded by RCWP
Democratic Platform; Демократическая платформа		Yury Afanasyev; Boris Yeltsin; Telman Gdlyan; Nikolay Ivanov; Nikolay Travkin; Igor Chubais; Vyacheslav Shostakovsky; Alexander Minzhurenko	Perestroika; Democratization; Social liberalism		1989–1991; Succeeded by RPRF
Communist Initiative Movement; Движение коммунистической инициативы		Viktor Tyulkin; Albert Makashov	Foundation of the Russian Communist Party; Anti-capitalism; Left-wing nationalism		1989–1991; Succeeded by RCWP
Marxist Platform; Марксистская платформа		Alexander Buzgalin; Sergey Skvortsov; Alexey Prigarin; Andrey Kolganov; Anatoly Kryuchkov	Orthodox Marxism; Marxism–Leninism		1990–1992; Succeeded by RCWP, RPC and SK
Democratic Movement; Демократическое движение		Anatoly Sobchak; Gavriil Popov; Vladimir Lysenko; Vyacheslav Shostakovsky; Alexander Rutskoy	Social democracy Democratization		1990–1992; Succeeded by NPSR

=== Clandestine and illegal parties ===
Name	Abbr.	Leader (s)	Ideology	Political position	Years active
Party of Left Socialist-Revolutionaries; Партия левых социалистов-революционеров	Left SRs; Левые эсеры	Boris Kamkov; Mark Natanson; Maria Spiridonova	Agrarian socialism Anti-Bolshevism; Revolutionary socialism Narodism	Far-left	1917–1921; Clandestine since 1918
True Communists; Истинные коммунисты	TC; ИК	Ivan Yatsuk; Yuri Shokk; Alexander Elin; Shamil Gubaidulin; Kamil Salakhutdinov	Marxism; Anti-Stalinism; Left communism	Far-left	1940–1940
Lithuanian Activist Front; Литовский фронт активистов Lietuvių Aktyvistų Frontas	LAF; ЛФА	Kazys Škirpa	Lithuanian independence Nazism; Anti-communism; Antisemitism; Anti-Polonism	Far-right	1940–1941
People's Socialist Party of Russia "Viking"; Народная социалистическая партия России «Викинг»	NSPR; НСПР	Konstantin Voskoboinik; Bronislav Kaminski	Nazism; Russian nationalism Russian collaborationism Antisemitism; Anti-communism	Far-right	1941–1943
Fighting Union of Russian Nationalists		Vladimir Gil	collaborationism	Far-right	1942
Russian National Labor Party			Russian nationalism collaborationism	Far-right	1943-?
Communist Party of Youth; Коммунистическая партия молодёжи	CPM; КПМ	Anatoly Zhigulin	Communism; Marxism–Leninism; Anti-Stalinism	Left-wing to far-left	1946–1949
All-Union Democratic Party; Всесоюзная демократическая партия	VDP; ВДП	Alexander Tarasov; Viktor Belkin	Anti-Stalinism; Socialism	Left-wing	1948–1948
Russian Party (USSR)			Russian nationalism Ethnic nationalism Antisemitism Factions: Stalinism; Anti-communism	Far-right Syncretic	1950s-1980s
Union of Struggle for the Cause of the Revolution; Союз борьбы за дело революции	SBDR; СБДР	Boris Slutsky; Evgeny Gurevich; Vladilen Furman	Anti-Stalinism; Revolutionary socialism	Far-left	1950–1951
Baltic Federation; Балтийская федерация Baltijas federācija	BF; БФ	Gunārs Rode; Dailis Rijnieks; Jānis Rijnieks; Aina Zābaka; Ziedonis Rozenbergs; Viktors Kalniņš; Uldis Ofkants	Anti-Sovietism; Latvian nationalism Latvian independence	Right-wing	1957–1962
Soviet Revolutionary Communists (Bolsheviks); Советские революционеры-коммунисты (большевики)	RC (b); РК (б)		Stalinism; Anti-revisionism; Marxism–Leninism; Communism	Far-left	1960-1991
Communards Union		S. D. Khakhaev Valery Ronkin	Khruschevism; Anti-Brezhnevism; Anti-Stalinism; Communism	Far-left	1963-1965
National United Party; Национальная объединённая партия Ազգային Միացյալ Կուսակցություն	NUP; НОП; ԱՄԿ	Haykaz Khachatryan; Paruyr Hayrikyan	Armenian nationalism Armenian independence National democracy Liberalism; Anti-communism	Big tent	1966–1987; Succeeded by UNSD
Free Russia Party; Партия свободной России; Revolutionary Workers' Party; Революционная рабочая партия	PSR; ПСР; RWP; РРП	Victor Pestov; Nikolay Shaburov	Anti-communism; Anti-Sovietism		1968–1970
Group of Revolutionary Communism; Группа революционного коммунизма	GRK; ГРК	Alexander Romanov; Oleg Senin; Valentin Kirikov	Marxism; Social democracy	Left-wing	1972–1972
All-Russian Social-Christian Union for the Liberation of the People; Всероссийский социал-христианский союз освобождения народа	VSKhSON; ВСХСОН	Igor Ogurtsov	Anti-communism; Russian nationalism Social Christianity; Third Position	Right-wing to far-right	1972–1972
Socialist Party of the Soviet Union; Социалистическая партия Советского Союза	SPSU; СПСС	Alexander Ganyushkin	Democratic socialism Self-governing socialism	Left-wing	1972–1972/1990-1992
Left School; Левая школа	LS; ЛШ	Natalia Magnat; Olga Barash; Inna Okup	Marxism–Leninism; Trotskyism; Atheistic existentialism New Left	Far-left	1972/73–1977
Party of New Communists; Партия новых коммунистов	PNC; РНК	Alexander Tarasov; Vasily Minorsky	Neo-communism; Orthodox Marxism; Marxism–Leninism; Revolutionary socialism Direct democracy Trotskyism; Neo-anarchism; Anti-Stalinism	Far-left	1972/73–1977
Neo-Communist Party of the Soviet Union; Неокоммунистическая партия Советского Союза	NCPSU; НКПСС	Alexander Tarasov; Natalia Magnat; Vasily Minorsky; Olga Barash; Igor Dukhanov	Neo-communism; Atheistic existentialism Communism; Guevarism; Neo-Marxism; Anti-clericalism; Trotskyism; New Left	Far-left	1974–1985
Young Socialists (Dissidents)		Boris Kagarlitsky Andrei Fadin Pavel Kudyukin	Social democracy (faction) Eurocommunism (faction)	Left-wing	1977-1982
Democratic Union; Демократический союз	DU; ДС	Valeriya Novodvorskaya	Classical liberalism Neoliberalism; Laissez-faire; Anti-Sovietism; Anti-communism; Anti-fascism; Individualism; Atlanticism	Centre-right	1988–2014

=== Parties of the multi-party period ===
Name	Abbr.	Leader (s)	Ideology	Political position	Years active
Democratic Union; Демократический союз	DU; ДС	Valeriya Novodvorskaya	Classical liberalism Neoliberalism; Laissez-faire; Anti-Sovietism; Anti-communism; Anti-fascism; Individualism; Atlanticism	Centre-right	1988–2014
Liberal Democratic Party of the Soviet Union; Либерально-демократическая партия Советского Союза	LDPSU; ЛДПСС	Vladimir Bogachov; Vladimir Zhirinovsky	Russian nationalism Ultranationalism; Right-wing populism Monarchism; Before 1990: Liberalism; Liberal conservatism	Right-wing to far-right Before 1990: Centre-right	1989–1992
Democratic Party of Russia; Демократическая партия России	DPR; ДПР	Nikolay Travkin	Anti-communism; Centrism; Liberalism	Centre-right	1990–1992
Socialist Party; Социалистическая партия	SP; СП	Boris Kagarlitsky; Anatoliy Baranov; Alexander Kolpakidi; Vladimir Kondratov	Democratic socialism Self-governing socialism	Left-wing	1990–1992
Social Democratic Party of Russia; Социал-демократическая партия России	SDPR; СДПР	Pavel Kudyukin; Oleg Rumyantsev; Alexander Obolensky	Social democracy Social liberalism Democratic socialism	Centre-left	1990–2011
All-Union Communist Party of Bolsheviks; Всесоюзная Коммунистическая партия большевиков	VKPB; ВКПБ	Nina Andreyeva	Communism; Marxism–Leninism; Bolshevism; Anti-revisionism; Stalinism	Far-left	1991–

== Parties of the Russian Empire (1721–1917) ==
=== Pre-revolutionary organizations ===
Name	Abbr.	Leader (s)	Ideology	Years active
Decembrist Societies; Общества декабристов	Decembrists; Декабристы	Sergei Trubetskoy; Nikita Muravyov; Pavel Pestel; Sergey Muravyov-Apostol and others	Constitutional monarchism Anti-Tsarist autocracy Anti-Serfdom; Republicanism (factions)	1816–1825
Petrashevsky Circle; Кружок Петрашевского	Petrashevtsy; Петрашевцы	Mikhail Petrashevsky	Utopian socialism Agrarian socialism	1844–1849
Land and Liberty; Земля и воля	Zemlevolists; Землевольцы	Collective leadership	Narodism; Agrarianism; Agrarian socialism (1860–64); Anarcho-collectivism (1876–1879)	1860–1864, 1876-1879
Committee of Russian Officers in Poland; Комитет русских офицеров в Польше	KROP; КРОП	Vasily Kaplinski; Jarosław Dąbrowski; Andrey Potebnya; Zygmunt Padlewski	Narodism; Republicanism	1861–1863
Grand Propaganda Society; Большое общество пропаганды	Tchaikovtsy; Чайковцы	Nikolai Tchaikovsky; Sophia Perovskaya; Mark Natanson	Narodism; Revolutionary socialism	1871–1874
Bashenists; Башенцы		Grigory Popko; Innokenty Voloshenko; Fedor Shcherbina	Radical Narodism; Republicanism	1874–1877
Narodnaya Volya; Народная воля	Narodovolists; Народовольцы	Collective leadership	Narodism; Agrarian socialism Left-wing terrorism Revolutionary socialism	1879–1884
Black Repartition; Чёрный передел	BR; ЧП	Georgi Plekhanov; Pavel Axelrod; Osip Aptekman; Leo Deutsch; Vera Zasulich	Narodism; Agrarian socialism Revolutionary socialism Federalism	1879–1881
Emancipation of Labour; Освобождение труда	OT; ОТ	Georgi Plekhanov; Pavel Axelrod	Marxism; Scientific socialism	1883–1903 merged into RSDLP
Social Revolutionary Party of People's Right; Социально-революционная партия Народного права	People's Right; Народное право	Mark Natanson; Nikolay Tyutchev	Narodism; Revolutionary democracy	1893–1894
League of Struggle for the Emancipation of the Working Class; Союз борьбы за освобождение рабочего класса	SBORK; СБОРК	Vladimir Ulyanov	Marxism; Social democracy	1895–1897 merged into RSDLP
Workers' Party for the Political Liberation of Russia; Рабочая партия политического освобождения России	RPPOR; РППОР	Grigory Gershuni; Catherine Breshkovsky	Narodism; Revolutionary socialism	1897–1900
Workers' Banner; Рабочее знамя	WB; РЗ	Sergey Andropov; Lydia Dan; Viktor Nogin	Social democracy Anti-Economism	1897–1902

=== Post-revolutionary parties ===
==== Left-wing ====
Name	Abbr.	Leader (s)	Ideology	Years active
General Jewish Labour Bund in Lithuania, Poland and Russia; Всеобщий еврейский рабочий союз в Литве, Польше и России אלגעמײנער ײדישער ארבעטער־בונד אין ליטע, פױלן און רוסלאנד	Bund; Бунд בונד	Victor Alter	Bundism; Socialism; Jewish Autonomism; Non-Zionism; Secularism	1897–1921
Russian Social Democratic Labour Party; Российская социал-демократическая рабочая партия	RSDLP; РСДРП	Vladimir Ulyanov (Bolsheviks); Julius Martov (Mensheviks)	Marxist socialism Revolutionary socialism Social democracy	1898–1912
Socialist Revolutionary Party; Партия социалистов-революционеров	Esers; Эсеры	Viktor Chernov	Agrarian socialism Revolutionary socialism Democratic socialism Federalism; Neo-Narodism	1902–1921
Zionist Socialist Workers Party; Сионистско-социалистическая рабочая партия ציוניסטישע סאציאליסטישע ארבעטער פארטײ	SS; СС צס	Naum Syrkin; Ber Borochov	Socialism; Zionism; Territorialism	1905–1917 merged into UJSWP
Jewish Socialist Workers Party; Социалистическая еврейская рабочая партия סאציאליסטישע ײדישע ארבעטער פארטײ	SEPR; СЕРП סיאפ	Chaim Zhitlowsky	Socialism; National personal autonomism	1905/6-1917 merged into UJSWP
Labour Popular-Socialist Party; Трудовая народно-социалистическая партия	Enes's; Энесы	Alexey Peshekhonov; Nikolai Annensky; Venedikt Miakotin	Neo-Narodism; Popular socialism Agrarian socialism Social democracy Left-wing nationalism	1906–1921
Jewish Social Democratic Labour Party (Poalei Zion); Еврейская социал-демократическая партия (Поалей Цион) ײדישע סאציאל דעמאקראטישער ארבעטער פארטיי (פאלעי ציון)	JSDLP(PZ); ЕСДРП(ПЦ) יסדאפ (פצ)	Ber Borochov; Yitzhak Ben-Zvi	Marxism; Socialist Zionism; Socialism; Centrist Marxism	1906–1928
Union of Socialists-Revolutionaries-Maximalists; Союз социалистов-революционеров-максималистов	Maximalists; Максималисты	Mikhail Sokolov; Vladimir Mazurin	Revolutionary socialism Neo-Narodism; Left-wing terrorism Anti-capitalism	1906–1911, 1917-1919
Labour Group; Трудовая группа	Trudoviks; Трудовики	Alexey Aladyin; Alexander Kerensky	Social democracy Neo-Narodism; Agrarian socialism	1906–1921
Russian Social Democratic Labour Party (Bolsheviks); Российская социал-демократическая рабочая партия (большевиков)	RSDLP(b); РСДРП(б)	Vladimir Lenin; Grigory Zinoviev	Communism; Bolshevism	1912–1918; Successed by RCP(b)
Russian Social Democratic Labour Party (Mensheviks); Российская социал-демократическая рабочая партия (меньшевиков)	RSDLP(m); РСДРП(м)	Julius Martov; Pavel Axelrod; Fyodor Dan	Social democracy Democratic socialism Menshevism	1912–1918
Russian Social Democratic Labor Party (Internationalists); Российская социал-демократическая рабочая партия (интернационалистов)	Mezhraiontsy; Межрайонцы	Leon Trotsky; Moisei Uritsky; Adolph Joffe; V. Volodarsky	Marxist socialism Proletarian internationalism Bolshevism-Menshevism	1913–1917; Merged into RSDLP(b)
Party of Left Socialist-Revolutionaries; Партия левых социалистов-революционеров	Left SRs; Левые эсеры	Boris Kamkov; Mark Natanson; Maria Spiridonova	Agrarian socialism Anti-Bolshevism (since 1918); Revolutionary socialism Neo-Narodism	1917–1921
Russian Socialist Labour Party of Internationalists; Российская социалистическая рабочая партия интернационалистов	RSLPI; РСРПИ	Boris Avilov; Vladimir Bazarov; Viacheslav Volgin; Nikolai Sukhanov	Marxist socialism Proletarian internationalism	1917–1920; Merged into RCP(b)
Party of Narodnik Communists; Партия народников-коммунистов	PNC; ПНК	Grigoriy Zaks	Communism; Neo-Narodism	1918-1918; Merged into RCP(b)
Party of Revolutionary Communism; Партия революционного коммунизма	PRC; ПРК	Mark Natanson; Alexei Ustinov; Andrei Kolegayev	Integral socialism Neo-Narodism	1918–1920; Merged into RCP(b)
Jewish Communist Party (Poalei Zion); Еврейская коммунистическая партия (Поалей Цион) ײדישע קאמוניסטישע פארטײ (פאאלעי ציון)	JСP(PZ); ЕКП (ПЦ) יקפ (פצ)	Central Committee	Communism; Marxism; Proletarian internationalism Socialist Zionism	1919–1922; Merged into RCP(b)
Union of Working Peasants; Союз трудового крестьянства	STK; СТК	Alexander Antonov; Pyotr Tokmakov	Anti-communism; Neo-Narodism; Agrarian socialism Revolutionary socialism	1920–1921

==== Centrist and moderate ====
Name	Abbr.	Leader (s)	Ideology	Years active
Progressive Economic Party of the Russian Empire; Прогрессивно-экономическая партия Российской империи Commercial and Industrial Union of the Russian Empire; Торгово-промышленный союз Российской империи Commercial and Industrial Party of the Russian Empire; Торгово-промышленная партия Российской империи	PEP; ПЭП; TPS; ТПС; TPP; ТПП	Grigory Krestovnikov	Anti-socialism; Bourgeoisie interests	1905-1905
Party of the Legal Order; Партия правового порядка	PPP; ППП	Anatoly Savenko	Constitutional monarchism Russian nationalism	1905–1917
Ittifaq al-Muslimin; Иттифак аль-Муслимин; İttifaqi-Müslimin اتفاق المسلمين	Ittifaq; Иттифак اتفاق	Alimardan bey Topchubashov; Khalil bey Khasmammadov; Abdurrahim bey Hagverdiyev	Islamic liberalism Jadidism; Constitutional monarchism	1905–1917
Constitutional Democratic Party; Конституционно-демократическая партия	Kadets; Кадеты	Pavel Miliukov	Constitutionalism; Constitutional monarchism Liberal democracy Parliamentarism; Political pluralism Social liberalism	1905–1917
Union of October 17; Союз 17 октября	Octoberists; Октябристы	Alexander Guchkov	Reformism; Liberal conservatism Constitutional monarchism	1905–1917
Union of freedom, Truth and Peace; Союз свободы, истины и мира	UFTP; ССИМ	Ivan Prokhanov; Nikolay Odintsov; Pyotr Frizen	Christian democracy Mennonism; Evangelical Christianity; Left Baptism; Constitutional monarchism	1905–1906
Party of Democratic Reform; Партия демократических реформ	PDR; ПДР	Maksim Kovalevsky	Classical liberalism	1906–1907; Merged into Progressive Party
Party of Peaceful Renovation; Партия мирного обновления	PMO; ПМО	Pyotr Heiden; Nikolay Lvov	Liberal conservatism Classical liberalism	1906–1907; Merged into Progressive Party
Progressive Party; Прогрессивная партия	Progressists; Прогрессисты	Aleksandr Konovalov; Ivan Yefryemov	Classical liberalism Conservative liberalism Constitutional monarchism	1907–1917

==== Right-wing ====
Name	Abbr.	Leader (s)	Ideology	Years active
Russian Assembly; Русское собрание	RS; РС	Dmitri Golitsyn; Nikolai Engelhardt	Orthodoxy, Autocracy, and Nationality; Monarchism; Conservatism; Russian nationalism	1900–1917
Russian Brotherhood; Русское братство	RB; РБ	major Protsenko; Pyotr Zhukov	Black Hundreds; Tsarist monarchism Great Russian nationalism National conservatism Christian fundamentalism antisemitism	1904–1913
Union of the Russian People; Союз русского народа	URP; СРН	Alexander Dubrovin; Nikolai Markov	Black Hundreds; Tsarist monarchism Russia for Russians; Triune Russian nation Great Russian nationalism Conservatism; Orthodox fundamentalism Right-wing populism Anti-Ukrainian sentiment Pochvennichestvo antisemitism	1905–1917
Union of the Russian Men; Союз русских людей	URM; СРЛ	Alexander Shcherbatov; Pavel Sheremetev; Pyotr Sheremetev	Black Hundreds; Tsarist monarchism Great Russian nationalism Conservatism; Orthodoxy, Autocracy, and Nationality antisemitism	1905-1910/11
Russian Monarchist Union; Русский монархический союз	RMU; РМС	Vladimir Gringmut; Mihail Hutorov	Black Hundreds; Tsarist monarchism Great Russian nationalism Conservatism	1905–1917
United Nobility; Объединённое дворянство	OD; ОД	Aleksei Bobrinsky; Alexander Naryshkin; Ananiy Strukov; Alexander Samarin	Tsarist monarchism Russian nationalism Nobility interests	1906–1917
Union of the Archangel Michael; Союз имени Михаила Архангела	SMA; СМА	Vladimir Purishkevich	Black Hundreds; Tsarist monarchism Russian ultranationalism National conservatism antisemitism	1908–1917
All-Russian National Union; Всероссийский национальный союз	VNS; ВНС	Pyotr Balashov; Vasily Shulgin	Russian nationalism Tsarist monarchism National liberalism National conservatism	1908–1917
Party of Moderate Right; Партия умеренно-правых	PMR; ПУП	Pyotr Balashov	Russian nationalism Tsarist monarchism Orthodox fundamentalism Anti-liberalism	1909–1910 merged into VNS
All-Russian Dubrovinist Union of the Russian People; Всероссийский дубровинский союз русского народа	ARDURP; ВДСРН	Alexander Dubrovin	Black Hundreds; Anti-Stolypin reform Great Russian ultranationalism National conservatism Orthodox fundamentalism Agrarianism antisemitism	1912–1917
Domestic Patriotic Union; Отечественный патриотический союз	OPS; ОПС	Vasiliy Orlov; Vasiliy Skvortsov	Tsarist monarchism Conservatism; Orthodox fundamentalism Anti-socialism	1915–1917

== See also ==
- List of ruling political parties by country
- Politics of Russia
