= Kolganov =

Kolganov (Russian: Колганов) is a Russian masculine surname, its feminine counterpart is Kolganova. It may refer to

- Andrey Kolganov (born 1955), Russian economist
- Michael Kolganov (born 1974), Israeli sprint canoer
- Mikhail Kolganov (athlete) (born 1980), Kazakhstani middle-distance runner
