= Styr Nyxas (political party) =

Political party in North and South Ossetia

Styr Nyxas Стыр Ныхас
- Founded: 21 May 1993
- Ideology: Ossetian nationalism; Styr Nyxas; Anti-Ingush sentiment; Anti-militarism

Styr Nyxas (Ossetian: Стыр Ныхас; Russian: Большой Совет, romanized: Bolshoy Sovet, lit. 'great council') is a political party active in the partially-recognised state of South Ossetia and the Russian republic of North Ossetia–Alania.

== History ==
Styr Nyxas was founded on 21 May 1993 at the Second Congress of the Ossetian People. Its first leader was history professor Mikhail Gioyev. Its representatives included several leading Ossetian politicians and intellectuals, such as Akhsar Tuallagov, executive secretary of the Republican Committee for the Rehabilitation of Victims of Political Repression and professors Muradin Kebekov, Tatarkan Gappoev, and Batyrbek Gadzaov.

The party holds Ossetian nationalist viewpoints, arguing for the unification of North and South Ossetia. It supported the North Ossetian government during the East Prigorodny conflict and opposed the return of ethnic Ingush to the Caucasus. It also called on the North Ossetian government to take measures to reduce the number of Russian military personnel in the republic and avoid involvement in Russian military operations. During the 1995 Russian regional elections several of the party's candidates were elected into the Parliament of the Republic of North Ossetia–Alania.

The party formed a political alliance with the Union of Defenders of Ossetia ahead of the 2009 South Ossetian parliamentary election. The RBK media group said that the alliance was one of the most likely winners of the election, though the party was not mentioned as receiving any votes according to results by South Ossetian state media.
