= People's Party of Russia =

People's Party of Russia Народная партия России
- Abbreviation: NPR (English); НПР (Russian)
- Leader: Stanislav Aranovich
- Founder: Andrei Bogdanov
- Founded: 11 April 2012
- Dissolved: 14 June 2019
- Headquarters: 13th building, Poltavskaya Street, Moscow, Russia
- Membership (2012): 500
- Ideology: Centrism; Populism; Anarchism (factions)
- Political position: Centre to centre-left
- Colours: Black; White
- Slogan: "The state must take care of its citizens" (Russian: «Государство должно заботиться о своих гражданах»)

Website
- narodpp.ru

The People's Party of Russia (PPR) (Note: Russian: Народная партия России (НПР), romanized: Narodnaja partija Rossii (NPR)) was a Russian center-left political party created by political strategist Andrei Bogdanov, which existed from 2012 until 2019. Journalists often called it the spoiler party.

== History ==
The party was formed on 11 April 2012, and registered by the Russian Ministry of Justice on 28 May under the chairmanship of the board of Alexander Vasenin, a friend of Denis Bogdanov—the eldest son of Democratic Party of Russia leader Andrei Bogdanov. The chairman of the Supreme Council of the party was a political strategist, director of the PR agency KG Aranovich and Partners LLC, president of the investment Russia public organization Stanislav Aranovich. Previously, Stanislav Aranovich was the head of the youth department of the Mordovian branch of the Union of Right Forces; from 2006 to 2008 of the Democratic Party of Russia; and from 2008 to 2012 of the Right Cause.

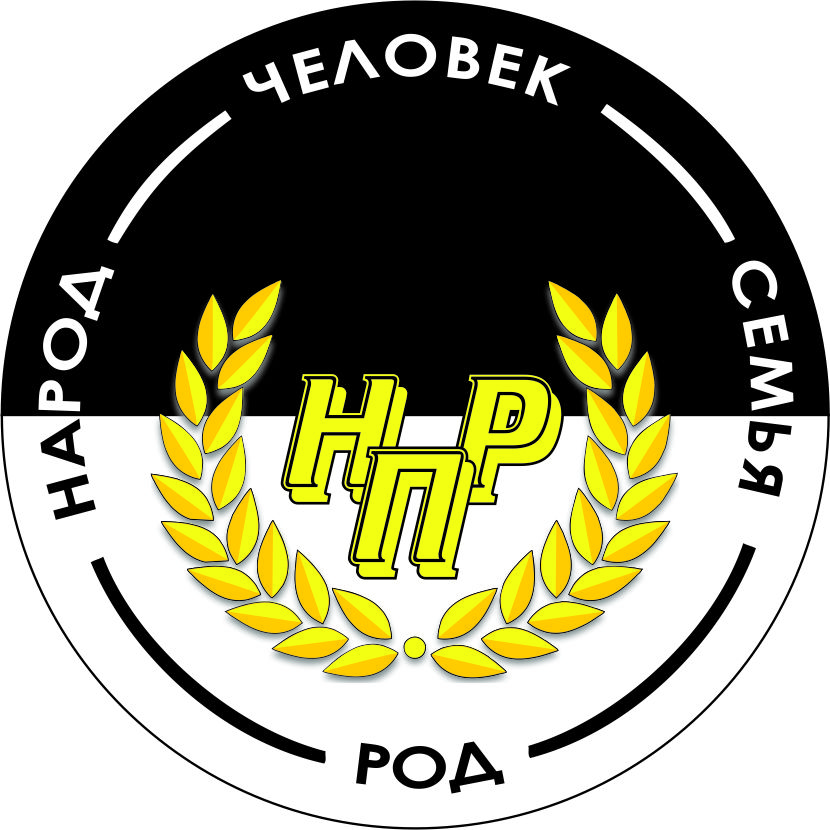
Logo used by the Voronezh branch of the party

The party itself did not have a program, while the Voronezh regional branch of the party in its program was an adherent of the ideology of anarchism and uses its own party symbols, which are different from the central one.

The party was created with the participation of the leader of the Democratic Party of Russia (DPR) and the Center of Political Technologies of the same name, Andrei Bogdanov, this was announced on 18 July at a joint press conference of the Coordinating Council – Technical Coalition, at which Bogdanov officially presented five new his participation in political parties: the restored Democratic Party of Russia, as well as the Union of Citizens under the leadership of Dmitry Popkov, the Social Democratic Party of Russia under the leadership of Viktor Militarev, the Communist Party of Social Justice under the leadership of Yuri Morozov and the People's Party of Russia, Which was represented by Stanislav Aranovich as its leader. The party is a member of the "Coordinating Council – Technical Coalition", created on the initiative of the leader of the DPR Andrey Bogdanov. The number of party members for 2012 is 500 people (the minimum required number of members for registration of a political party after the amendments to the federal law FZ-95 of 23 March 2012).

The Internet edition Lenta.ru stated that the party of the same name is a spoiler and the party business of its owners, political strategists Bogdanov and Aranovich. The registered brand they own was put up for sale, as evidenced by the party's program, which consists of three general proposals, published on the website of the Ministry of Justice of Russia.

On 3 December 2013, in connection with the events at Euromaidan, party leader Stanislav Aranovich, together with lawyer Dmitry Tretyakov, made a statement that Russia within the CIS is obliged to come up with an initiative for the Government of Ukraine to provide support against the opposition up to force intervention by sending the forces of the Ministry of Internal Affairs of Russia to help their Ukrainian colleagues.

On 14 June 2019, the Supreme Court, at the suit of the Ministry of Justice, liquidated the party for seven years for not participating in the regional elections.

== Elections ==
=== 2012 ===
On 14 October 2012, the party took part in 3 out of 6 regional legislative assemblies. According to their results, the party did not receive a single mandate: North Ossetia (448) 0.20% of the votes, Penza Oblast (2020) 0.37% of votes, Tver Oblast (229) 0.28% of the votes.

=== 2013 ===
On 10 July 2013, at the elections to the Togliatti Duma, the center of Andrei Bogdanov submitted documents for 7 parties, including the People's Party of Russia; on 12 July, the city election commission refused to register all seven parties, but already on 24 July, the higher Samara Regional Election Commission canceled the decision of the local election commission and returned the parties to registration, who subsequently received 370 votes (0.23%).

On 20 June 2013, at the elections for the head of the city of Voronezh, the people's party nominated the head of the urban settlement of Semiluki Nikolai Markov (born 1981) (previously composed and elected with the support of the Communist Party), who later gained 7,198 votes (3.74%).

In the elections on a single voting day on 8 September 2013, the party nominated its candidates mainly on party lists, with an average turnout of 32.5%, having received the following result:

- Arkhangelsk Oblast, Arkhangelsk Regional Assembly of Deputies 541 votes (0.22%), in the city council of Arkhangelsk received 116 votes (0.21%)
- Kemerovo Oblast, Council of People's Deputies of the Kemerovo region 930 votes (0.06%)
- Smolensk Oblast, Smolensk Regional Duma 664 votes (0.28%)
- Yakutia, State Assembly 1,090 votes (0.39%), 112 votes to the city duma of Yakutia (0.20%), to the City Duma of Yakutsk 112 votes (0.20%)
- Buryatia, People's Khural 703 votes (0.24%)
- Chechen Republic, Parliament 163 votes (0.03%)

In 2016, the party did not participate in the elections to the State Duma of the 7th convocation; the party did not have a representative in the regional or city parliament and was not exempt from collecting signatures. The party did not collect signatures for nomination.

In October 2017, ahead of the 2018 Russian presidential election, the party entered the association of non-parliamentary parties “Forum Third Power”, nominating a candidate for the primaries of the bloc, chairman of the “National Parents' Committee” Irina Volynets.

=== Leadership ===
- Stanislav Aranovich — Chairman of the Supreme Council

== See also ==
- People's Party of the Russian Federation (NPRF) — existed in Russia from 1999 to 2007
- Political parties in Russia
