= Alania (political party) =

Former political party in North Ossetia, Russia

Union for the National Revival of Alania Союз национального возрождения Алании
- Leader: Aleksandr Ramonov
- Founded: 28 April 1991
- Dissolved: Mid-1990s
- Ideology: National Bolshevism; Ossetian nationalism; Soviet patriotism; Digor rights
- Political position: Far-left

The Union for the National Revival of Alania (Russian: Союз национального возрождения Алании, romanized: Soyuz natsionalnogo vozrozhdeniya Alanii), abbreviated as Alania (Russian: Алания, romanized: Alaniya), was a political party in the Russian republic of North Ossetia–Alania during the early 1990s.

== History ==
The Union for the National Revival of Alania was established on 28 April 1991 by Aleksandr Ramonov and other officers of the Soviet Army. Subscribing to National Bolshevism, the party argued for the preservation of the Soviet Union under the Communist Party, It additionally supported increasing the rights of the Digor people, and recognition of Ossetians as being direct descendants of the Alans. The party's political programme called for active measures to strengthen the Ossetian language, ensure a "national-cultural revival", and conduct scientific studies on the historical origins of the Ossetians.

In July 1994, Alania founded its own newspaper, known as Alanta. During the 1995 Russian regional elections, it failed to win a single seat, and the party subsequently fell into inactivity during the mid-1990s.

== Election results ==
Election	Votes	%	Seats	+/–	Leader
1995	196	7.3	0 / 34	—	Aleksandr Ramonov
