= Conservatism in Russia =

Conservatism (Note: Russian: Консерватизм, romanized: Konservatizm) in Russia is a broad system of political beliefs that is characterized by support for Orthodox values, Russian imperialism, statism, economic interventionism, advocacy for the historical Russian sphere of influence, and a rejection of late modernist era Western culture.

Like other conservative movements, Russian conservatism is seen as defending the established institutions of its time, such as the Tsarist autocracy. Russian conservatism rejects the concept of laissez-faire economics and instead supports a mixed economy, as opposed to economic liberalism. This makes Russian conservatism largely populist in its promotion of economic interventionist views, strong nationalism, and social conservatism. Russian conservatives believe that the state should control both economic and social policy, as it aligns with its origins in Tsarism and the teachings of the Russian Orthodox Church.

== Overview ==
Russia has a strong history of authoritarian practices. Despite the growth of liberalism in 19th and 20th century Western European countries, like Germany, Italy, and Spain, a succession of autocratic governments has shaped the political ideologies of modern Russia. Due to the stagnation of culturally and economically liberal ideals in Russia, Russian conservatism is unique in its support of a mixed economy and its condemnation of the Western world's broad understanding of liberty and liberal democracy. After the dissolution of the Soviet Union in 1991, the two main conservative political parties in Russia have been United Russia and the Liberal Democratic Party of Russia.

=== State control ===
Russian conservatives believe in the government largely controlling both economic and social policy, with a strong centralized state influenced by nationalist and imperialist ideologies. They also believe in opposition to Western globalism, and the promotion of Russian ideals and culture with support for the Russian sphere of influence through art and media. The authoritarian ideals in both Tsarist and Soviet Russia of devotion to the state and strong nationalism are supported by Russian conservatives, who believe in a return to Russian ideals in reaction to modernism and globalism, with strong opposition to globalist organizations such as the United Nations, the European Union, and NATO. With classical liberalism playing major roles in the development of conservatism in Western democracies, Russia largely differs from conservatism in other parts of the world with its belief in state control. With Russian conservatives holding largely interventionist views in international affairs, they hold deep contempt for the United States and strong support for the Commonwealth of Independent States other than Georgia and Ukraine.

After 2014, Russia often presented itself as "the last bastion of conservatism" worldwide through its state-controlled foreign media, gaining some traction when in 2016 a conservative German family moved to Russia to "protect their children from sexual permissiveness of German society", but returned to Germany shortly after. In 2023 Russian authorities once again declared themselves "the last bastion" and invited American conservatives to move to a dedicated village in Moscow suburbs.

=== Social views ===
Social views held by conservative Russians are largely influenced by traditionalism and the Russian Orthodox Church. Like conservatives in other parts of the world, Russian conservatives believe in the promotion of Christian ethics in its opposition to abortion, homosexuality, euthanasia, and its support for gender roles in the government and in civil life. Social conservatism is of utmost importance in political discourse. Influenced by the autocratic views held by the Russian tsars and the Bolsheviks, Russian conservatives believe in the rule of law, and the cult of personality. Strong nationalist sentiments are largely held, influencing the support for national and state unity against foreign influence. The suppression of individual freedoms are believed to be necessary in law enforcement and halting social progressivism. Western culture and modernism are largely opposed in favor of realism, seen as largely a product of the consumerist cultures of Western democracies. Under Vladimir Putin, the leader of the Russian government since 1999, Russia has expressively condemned foreign influences, and believes in expanding Russia's own influence, as with the annexation of Crimea in 2014, and opposes nuclear disarmament.

=== Economic views ===
Although economic liberalism and laissez-faire capitalism have been key in the history of conservatism in Western countries, the historical role of state control in Russia has resulted in the development of state interventionist views of Russian conservatives in respect to the economy. Although both major post-Soviet conservative parties largely condemn communism, Russian conservatives largely believe in a mixed economy, with a mixture of regulations in the private sector with market freedoms, public ownership of several key industries such as energy and defence, and low to moderate distributions of wealth across the economy. Russian conservatives believe in the government intervening in markets and regulating the private sector, as it has a necessary role in the framework of a capitalist economy. Along with other conservatives in the world, Russian conservatives believe in protectionism, and the regulation of global interaction with the Russian economy, through the use of tariffs and government subsidies to domestic producers.

=== Religious views ===
As strong adherents to the Russian Orthodox Church, Russian conservatives largely espouse traditional Christian views on social issues, with the church collaborating closely with the state in social and cultural affairs under Russian president Putin's successive administrations. The rise of globalization and liberal morality in Western democracies has been frequently confronted in Putin-era Russia. The Orthodox Church's opposition to homosexual lifestyles, support of traditional marriage, and families has met with general domestic acceptance, while its tacit support for Russian expansion into Crimea and eastern Ukraine has earned international criticism. Under Patriarch Kirill, the Russian Orthodox Church has sought to promote traditional morality within Russia over liberal relativism, while working to proscribe homosexual influence in broader society, particularly among minors.

== History ==
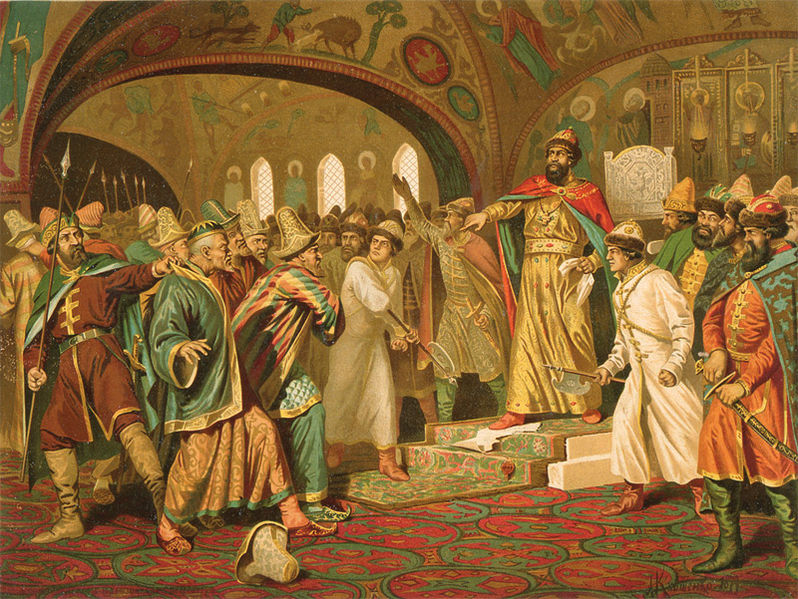
Ivan III laid the foundations of Tsarist autocracy, a system of governance which would influence the authoritarian nature of Russian conservatism.

The traditions of autocracy and patrimonialism developed in Russia in the 17th and 18th century, as Ivan III of Russia built upon Byzantine traditions of autocracy, allowing for the development of Tsarism and the monarchy of the Romanov dynasty in the 19th and 20th centuries. According to anti-communist academic Richard Pipes and political scientist Stephen White, this paved the groundwork for the development of totalitarianism in the Soviet Union after the October Revolution, describing the fabric of Russian identity being interwoven with autocracy. This progression of autocratic governments did not allow for the spread and rapid development of liberal ideals as seen in Western Europe, with state interventionism remaining the key ideology in all Russian parties. This influenced the development of conservative thought post the dissolution of the Soviet Union in 1991, with state control playing a key role in Russian traditionalism.

Attempts at liberal restructuring of the Soviet economy and political landscape through Mikhail Gorbachev's perestroika reforms during the 1980s and 1990s were largely suppressed by the return to authoritarian politics under the conservative Putin government, after his predecessor Boris Yeltsin was unable to keep on course with social and economic reform. The Russian youth played a key role in the 2000s, developing conservative ideas away from the traditional Western liberal sense, with the Gorbachev and Yeltsin liberal reforms being seen as a time of political upheaval and chaos. A 1987 survey undertaken by Russian sociologist Yuri Levada found the ageing soviet citizens of the 1980s, or homo Sovieticus, who still had memories of Stalinism and the one-party rule in the Soviet Union, were a dying breed, as the younger and more naive generations in Russia began to shape the political climate of the future. A disdain for liberal reform and lack of knowledge for the reign of terror under Joseph Stalin allowed for the youth in Russia to develop into the hardline nationalist faction of Russian politics, allowing for the polarization of Russian politics and development of totalitarian ideas in conservatism.

== Political parties ==
The two main conservative parties in Russia are the Liberal Democratic Party of Russia (LDPR) led by Leonid Slutsky and United Russia led by its de facto leader Vladimir Putin. Other Russian conservative parties include Rodina, the Russian All-People's Union, and the Eurasia Party. United Russia is the ruling party of Russia and largest party of Russia, holding 74.4% of seats in the State Duma.

The LDRP was founded in 1992 by Zhirinovsky as a more ideological conservative party. The LDRP scored 22.9% of votes in the 1993 state Duma elections, opposing the right–left dichotomy in Russia like the United Russia party. In 2016, the party received 13.4% of the vote, giving it 39 of the 450 seats in the State Duma. During the 1990s, Zhirinovsky and the LDPR formed a component of the political opposition to Yeltsin in the 1990s, although members of the party largely voted against the impeachment of Yeltsin in 1999. Into the 2010s, the LDPR has often supported the agenda of the United Russia party and Putin government when voting in the Duma, leading some to believe that the party receives funding from the Kremlin.

== Criticism ==
Although the ideology itself has not been poorly received by the general public, political parties such as United Russia have come under intense scrutiny as a party of "crooks and thieves", a term coined by activist Alexei Navalny amidst the corruption in Russia which was consistently used by opposition parties during the 2011 election to characterize the United Russia party as being corrupted and concerned with "maintaining and strengthening their own power". The 2011–2013 Russian protests show the Russians public's perception of a flawed election process in Russia, and the yearning for a more democratic process against what they believe has become an authoritarian government.

The ideology of Russian conservatism has been criticized as authoritarian and an oppressive system of governance. Opposition from both left-wing and right-wing groups has characterized the Putin government's harsh laws in promoting stability in the country, as being exercised to cement the government's own power. Regulations on freedom of the press and economic interventionism have been opposed starkly by right-libertarians, while social views on abortion and Putin's ban on LGBT rights has been criticized by left-wing groups.

Declarative conservatism of the Russian authorities has been described as hypocrisy by those who pointed out the lavish lifestyle of Russian elites, numerous morality scandals in which top politicians were involved, a bizarre mix of Orthodox, Soviet, and Stalinist symbolism (the latter two being ideologically anti-religious), widespread abortion, sexually transmitted diseases, and high divorce rates.

== List of prominent Russian conservative thinkers ==
- Nikolay Danilevsky
- Fyodor Dostoevsky
- Ivan Ilyin
- Mikhail Katkov
- Konstantin Leontiev
- Natalia Narochnitskaya
- Konstantin Pobedonostsev
- Igor Shafarevich
- Vladimir Solovyov
- Sergey Solovyov
- Aleksandr Solzhenitsyn
- Nikolay Strakhov
- Lev Tikhomirov
- Sergei Trubetskoy

== See also ==
- Elections in Russia
- Eurasianism
- History of Russia
- History of Russia (1991–present)
- History of the Soviet Union
- Liberalism in Russia
- Neo-Stalinism
- Opposition to Vladimir Putin in Russia
- Politics of Russia
- Putinism
- Traditionalist conservatism
