= National Socialist Russian Workers' Party =

National Socialist Russian Workers' Party Национал-социалистическая русская рабочая партия
- Abbreviation: NSRWP (English); НСРРП (Russian)
- Leader: Mikhail Glukhov
- Founded: 23 June 1994
- Dissolved: 1997
- Preceded by: Oprichny Dvor
- Merged into: Liberal Democratic Party of Russia
- Headquarters: Kazan, Tatarstan, Russia
- Membership (1994): >20
- Ideology: Russian ultranationalism Neo-Nazism; Anti-Americanism; Anti-Turkism
- Political position: Far-right
- National affiliation: Russian National Unity
- Colours: Brown
- Slogan: "Nationalists of all countries, unite!" (Russian: "Националисты всех стран, объединяйтесь!")

Party flag

The National Socialist Russian Workers' Party (NSRWP; Russian: Национал-социалистическая русская рабочая партия; НСРРП; Natsional-sotsialisticheskaya russkaya rabochaya partiya, NSRRP) was an ultranationalist social and political organization operating in the city of Kazan in 1994–1997.

== Emergence, founding conference ==
Members of the NSRWP considered the founding date of the organization to be August 1993, when its "core" – the organization ("order") "Oprichny Dvor" was created. Then the head of the latter – the former pastor of the Baptist church Mikhail Yuryevich Glukhov (born 1960) – took part in two election campaigns to the State Duma, preparing the basis for the creation of a larger political organization.

The name of this man says practically nothing today to the residents of Tatarstan, but 11 thousand Kazan citizens gave him their votes in the elections to the State Duma on 12 December last year, just five months after Mikhail Glukhov announced the creation of the Oprichny Dvor party in Kazan, the beginnings whose ideologies are already visible through the name.

The main initiator of the creation of the NSRWP was Mikhail Glukhov, who simultaneously controlled the activities of the Kazan branch of the movement "Russian National Unity".

Besides Mikhail Glukhov, A. Fomenko, I. Zakharov, V. Trayanov and others spoke at the founding conference.

M. Yu. Glukhov himself was proclaimed the leader of the NSRRP, A. Fomenko was appointed his deputy and the commander of the "security detachment".

== Ideology, composition of the organization ==
According to the information presented in one of the publications of the Kazan journalist V.V. Kurnosov, Mikhail Glukhov said in his speech that the NSRWP was ready to shed blood in the fight against the local ruling clans who "want to sell themselves to the Turks and Americans", and "in use us – Russians and Tatars as a bedding », emphasizing in this case that« every third member of the organization is a Tatar».

At the same time, he noted that the "religion" of the party is National Socialism, and therefore the NSRWP does not intend to support any of the existing confessions, and also promised that: "We will slam the Russian National Council and the branch of the LDPR, and then – the "commies", so as not to get underfoot!"

According to Mikhail Glukhov, Kazan was to become "the capital of National Socialism in Russia." At the same time, the slogan of the party used the appeal "Nationalists of all countries, unite!"

The party's goals were formulated as follows:

«1. Russian should be the master of his land.

2. A decent life for a working man».

The tasks of the NSRWP were proclaimed:

«1. Spiritual and biological improvement of the Russian nation, purity of Russian culture and language, strengthening of the family, the establishment of moral and ethical censorship.

2. Creation of a powerful Russian state built on the principles of dictatorship and social justice.

3. The existing boundaries are not immutable.

4. Merciless fight against crime.

5. State ownership of the means of production.

6. The state provides a full range of social guarantees.

7. Preparing Russian youth to run a nation state.

8. Creation of a new community of Russian people».

On 15 July, the center of Kazan was covered with leaflets of the National Socialist Russian Workers' Party (NSRWP). The party was founded by Mikhail Glukhov, a former preacher and candidate for the State Duma of Russia. "Do not believe when they say that nothing depends on you. Tomorrow, Kazan will be in your dependence, the day after tomorrow – Russia, and then – the whole world, "says the leaflet, which summarizes the NSRWP program. National Socialists from Tatarstan intend to establish a "dictatorship of conscience." Party leader M. Glukhov began an election campaign for a seat in the Supreme Soviet of Tatarstan. Elections will take place in the spring of 1995.The election program of the Nazis// Era Rossii. — 1994. — № 4 (Сентябрь). — С. 2.

== Activities evaluations ==
On the creation and political statements of the leader of the NSRWP Mikhail Glukhov in the mid-1990s. Kazan press repeatedly wrote, which provided the party with noticeable scandalous fame.

The founding conference of the NSRWP was included, in particular, within the framework of the human rights commission under the President of the Russian Federation "On the observance of human and civil rights in the Russian Federation in 1994–1995," where it was noted that the ideology of the party "is largely aligned with the ideology of others extremist organizations".

Analyzing the activities of the NSRWP, the Kazan historian I.E. Alekseev noted: "At the same time, the topical national problems and needs of the Russian people were considered in its ideology only through the prism of abstract socio-political rhetoric and "biological" terms. So, for example, in one of the first documents of the NSRWP under the laconic title "Appeal", it was first reported that "rats were in our common house", and then their detailed description was given. From the latter it followed that "the rats have no national pride: for them – to lie under the Turks or Americans for happiness", that their favorite pastime is "to raise prices in stores", that "rats do not like the National Socialists – after all, they will prevent intoxicating young people with drugs or make homosexuals out of young men, "that" rats see in your beloved girl, in your daughter – only a prostitute", etc. "Therefore," the conclusion was drawn, "the dying squeak of a crushed rat is the most pleasant sound for the National Socialists."

== Termination of activity ==
Both from a political-pragmatic and from an organizational point of view, the NSRWP, like all the organizations created by Mikhail Glukhov, had a shocking, "leadership" character and did not have a serious social support, which is why its activities ceased shortly after Mikhail Glukhov (who in 1997 became an adviser to the President of the Republic of Mari El Vyacheslav Kislitsyn) in Yoshkar-Ola.

After the termination of the activities of the NSRWP, some of its members moved to the "liberal democrats".

S.A. Sergeev, Candidate of Historical Sciences, wrote about this in 1998: «Some of the young people who were members of the NSRWP joined the Kazan branch of the Liberal Democratic Union of Youth. They could be seen at rallies in Kazan, in which the LDPR took part. Their appearance resembled skinheads: shaved heads, heavy boots, black jackets. In their words, however, they are not skinheads: "Skinheads, for example, beat foreigners – we don't touch them, although they do harm».

== Books ==
- Alekseev I.E. Russian national movement in the Kazan province and Tatarstan: late XIX – early XXI centuries (dictionary experience). – Kazan: Publishing House "Master Line", 2004. – S.S. 166 – 168.
