= Party of the Dictatorship of the Proletariat =

Russian Maoist political party

The Party of the Dictatorship of the Proletariat (Russian: Партия диктатуры пролетариата, romanized: Partiya diktatury proletariata) (PDP) is a communist political party in Russia, that practices a variant form of Maoist thought most similar to Marxism-Leninism-Maoism, though the Party itself refuses to comment on its beliefs beyond "Marxist", or "Communist". It is the successor to the Samara Stachkom, a Maoist Russian dissident movement from the time of the Era of Stagnation during the Soviet Union.

The PDP was founded in 1989, by Alexei Razlatsky and Grigory Isayev, communist dissidents in the Samara region of Russia. Following several early splits in the party, and the death of Razlatsky in 1989, the party solidified under Isayev's leadership. Since that point, the Party has mainly directed criticism towards the United Russia party of President Vladimir Putin. As Isayev himself said he "Sees almost no difference between the then rotten CPSU and the current rotten 'United Russia'", referencing the latter's former struggles against the Communist Party of the Soviet Union and Leonid Brezhnev in the 1970-80s.

The party is currently based in the city of Samara and was led by Grigory Isayev, until his death in 2020. The Party has never contested elections, as its support is small and highly localized to machine workers in the Samara region, many of whom have been long-time members. Following the death of Isayev, the party's standing remains unclear in Russia, and it may have ceased to exist or returned to a purely underground state.

The PDP publishes the newspaper Zabastovka (English: "strike action").
