= Osip Aptekman =

Russian Revolutionary (1849–1926)

- О́сип Аптекма́н
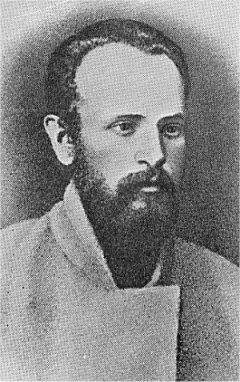
- Born: March 30, 1849; Pavlohrad, Yekaterinoslav Governorate, Russian Empire
- Died: July 8, 1926 (aged 77); Russia

Osip Vasilyevich Aptekman (Russian: О́сип Васильевич Аптекма́н) (March 18(30), 1849, Pavlohrad – July 8, 1926) was a Russian revolutionary, member of the Land and Liberty, and one of the founders of the Black Repartition.

== Biography ==
Born in Ukraine to an upper class Jewish family, Osip Aptekman studied medicine in Kharkov from 1870. In 1873, as the start of the 'to the people' movement, when idealistic students travelled to the countryside hoping to radicalise the peasants, he and two other students from Kharkov, Constantin Dobrogeanu-Gherea and S.N.Kulasko set up a blacksmith shop in Gherea's home village, Slavyanka. They had to abandon the project to avoid arrest. He returned to Kharkov to complete his studies. In 1874, a few months after qualifying as a surgeon, he again 'went to the people' in the Volga region, and was one of the organisers of Land and Liberty (Земля и Воля - Zemlya i Volya).

When Zemlya i Volya split in August 1879, with one faction - impatient with the failure to politicise the peasantry - breaking off the form the People's Will and plan the assassination of the Tsar, Aptekman joined the future founder of Russian Marxism, Georgi Plekhanov and in organising Black Partition (Черный Передел -Cherny Peredel) grouping which insisted that the continued use of propaganda was the best means of achieving social change. He edited the group's journal. In 1880, he was arrested and sentenced to five years exile in Yakutsk, in Siberia. When his term of exile ended, he emigrated to Munich, to resume his study of medicine. He returned to Russia in 1889, to practise as a country doctor in Nizhny Novgorod region.

In 1893 and 1894 Aptekman was one of the primary leaders of the People's Rights Party (Partiia Narodnogo Prava), an illegal constitutionalist populist organization. But later in the same decade, when Marxist ideas began to spread among the young, he broke with the Narodniks and joined what became the Russian Social Democratic Labour Party. When the RSDLP split, in 1903, he sided with the Mensheviks. During the 1905 revolution, he travelled from district to district, organising armed groups of revolutionaries, until he was arrested and imprisoned. Released in May 1906, he emigrated to Switzerland. After the outbreak of war in 1914. he sided with the Menshevik-Internationalists, led by Yuri Martov Having returned to Russia after the February Revolution, in 1919, aged 70, he announced that he accepted the legitimacy of the communist government. In his final years, he worked for the Historical and Revolutionary Archives, in St Petersburg.
