= Grigory Isayev =

Russian politician and labor activist (1943–2020)

Grigory Isayev Григорий Исаев
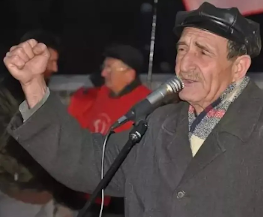

Leader of the Party of the Dictatorship of the Proletariat
- In office July 1992 – 20 July 2020

Personal details
- Born: Grigory Zinovyevich Isayev; 1 July 1943 Sadovoye, Krasnopartizansky District, Russian SFSR, Soviet Union
- Died: 20 July 2020 (aged 77)
- Party: Communist Party of the Soviet Union (1950–1989)
- Other political affiliations: Party of the Dictatorship of the Proletariat (1990–2020)

Grigory Zinovyevich Isayev (Russian: Григорий Зиновьевич Исаев; 1 July 1943 – 20 July 2020) was a Russian politician and labor activist. He was the leader of the Samara Stachkom (Strike Committee) and the Party of the Dictatorship of the Proletariat. A young man when Joseph Stalin died, he soon developed an admiration for Stalin's ideology that would drive him throughout life. His young experiences, along with a three-year tour in the Soviet Army in Germany, served to harden his anti-reformist tendencies ideologically. Later joining Alexei Razlatsky in the Soviet dissident movement, the two would form the Samara Stachkom, a Maoism aligned dissident network. Throughout the 1970s, Isayev and the Stachkom engaged routinely in short strikes for "simple" changes in working conditions. Also a key part of Isayev's dissident life was the copying of Ideological Notebooks, done to circumvent Soviet censors and spread awareness of the Stachkom.

After Wojciech Jaruzelski declared martial law in Poland in 1981, Soviet crackdowns on dissidents and strikers became more common. Two days later, on December 15, Isayev and Razlatsky, along with most of the Stachkom leadership were then arrested and sentenced to a prison camp for their roles in organizing a workers' strike and an underground communist organization in the Soviet Union while under Leonid Brezhnev's rule. Isayev was sentenced to "5 years of camps and 5 of exile", and spent the next 5 years in a camp outside the city of Perm. This process was aggravated by Brezhnev's death, and the rise of Viktor Chebrikov as head of the KGB, whose time in leadership was "the heyday of the KGB", leading to many further dissident arrests and convictions. Under the leadership of Yuri Andropov and Chebrikov, "almost all known dissidents were arrested or expelled", including all known associates of the Stachkom. After Isayev's release, he continued to lead the Stachkom's remnants, eventually forming them into the "Party of the Dictatorship of the Proletariat", a Mao-Zedong-Thought aligned political party in the Russian Federation. He was arrested twice under Boris Yeltsin in 1998 for leading the successful two-month-long strike of the 5,000 ZIM (Zavod imeni Maslennikova) factory's workers and the blockade of the main street of Samara which paralyzed the center of the city.

Later in life, Isayev was often invited to be a guest speaker at schools and universities, speaking on the subjects of Philosophy and Marxism–Leninism. Isayev lived in the Stachkom's headquarters, a former bomb shelter. Many Russian communist ideologues and politicians had visited this shelter, and engaged with Isayev in debate, generally ending in the visiting party being branded a "Counter-Revolutionary". Isayev died on July 20, 2020, in Samara, having become locally loved for his resistance to the Yeltsin regime later in life.
