= Social Democratic Party of Russia (1990) =

Social Democratic Party of the Russian Federation Социал-демократическая партия Российской Федерации
- Abbreviation: SDPR
- Leader: Vladimir Maslov (last)
- Founders: Pavel Kudyukin; Oleg Rumyantsev; Alexander Obolensky
- Founded: 4 May 1990
- Registered: 14 March 1991
- Dissolved: 6 March 2002 (deregistered) 1 April 2011 (finally deregistered)
- Preceded by: Social Democratic Association
- Merged into: Social Democratic Party of Russia (Factions); SDPR (internationalists) (Factions)
- Headquarters: Gorodskaya 1, Moscow
- Newspaper: News of Social democracy
- Membership (1992): 6,500
- Ideology: Social democracy
- Political position: Centre-left
- International affiliation: Socialist International
- Colours: Red
- Slogan: "Liberty! Justice! Solidarity!" (Russian: "Свобода! Справедливость! Солидарность!")
- 1st State Duma: 1 / 450

Website
- sdpr.org

The Social Democratic Party of the Russian Federation (Russian: Социал-демократическая партия Российской Федерации, romanized: Sotsial-demokraticheskaya partiya Rossiyskoy Federatsii; SDPR) was a social democratic organization in modern Russia, founded in May 1990. SDPR was one of the first new parties created in the USSR. LDPSU was registered a little earlier - in April. SDPR has become the first new party, not only created, but also registered in Russia - registered by the Ministry of Justice of the RSFSR March 14, 1991, registration number 27.

== History ==
The SDPR was established in May 1990, but this was preceded by a rather long "preparatory period". First (February 1989), the Social Democratic Confederation was created, bringing together a number of informal clubs and groups from different cities. In January 1990, KFOR, together with the Moscow club "Democratic Perestroika" and a representative of social democratic groups from the republic of the USSR (Ukraine, Belarus, Estonia), took part in the establishment of the Social Democratic Association - an organization of an all-union scale. At the same time, an organizing committee of the Social Democratic Party of the Russian Federation was formed in the SDA, the constituent congress of which was held on May 4, 1990 in Moscow. In the fall of 1990, the SDPR joined the Democratic Russia movement as a collective member. In addition, it planned to unite with the Republican Party of the Russian Federation, created in November 1990.

In 1993, the SDPR entered the Yavlinsky-Boldyrev-Lukin electoral bloc (won 7.86% of the vote; its chairman, Anatoly Golov, passed from the SDPR to the State Duma).

In 1994, it split into two parts, in 1995 it formally united under the leadership of Sergei Belozertsev. Then party entered the electoral bloc “Faith, Labor, Conscience” (The bloc did not collect signatures, did not participate in the elections).

In 2002, the party was liquidated by the Ministry of Justice as not being re-registered under the new law.

After attempts to re-register, the party was finally liquidated in 2011.
