= Oprichny Dvor (organization) =

Russian social and political organization

Oprichny Dvor Опричный двор
- Leader: Mikhail Glukhov
- Founded: 13 August 1993
- Dissolved: 23 June 1994
- Succeeded by: National Socialist Russian Workers' Party
- Headquarters: Kazan, Tatarstan, Russia
- Ideology: Russian ultranationalism
- Political position: Far-right
- Colours: Black; Red

The Oprichny Dvor (Russian: Опричный двор; literally Apart Yard) or Oprichniks (Russian: Опричники; Oprichniki) was a Russian ultranationalist social and political organization that operated in the city of Kazan in 1993–1994.

== Emergence ==
According to the Kazan press, the "oprichniks" first openly declared themselves on August 13, 1993, when "the leaders of the Russian communists arrived in Kazan on a motor ship for agitation purposes: Lieutenant Colonel Stanislav Terekhov, chairman of the "Union of Officers" and Sazhi Umalatova, chairman of the "Permanent Presidium Congress of People's Deputies of the USSR".

"The unusualness of the visiting celebrities", - noted the journalist V.V. Kurnosov, - "was given by the security, young guys in black shirts with red bands on their left hand".

In 1999, a photo of the meeting with the caption: “There are no fascists in Tatarstan, but there were oprichniks ...”, the Kazan newspaper “Vremya i Dengi” posted on its pages.

== Ideology, leaders ==
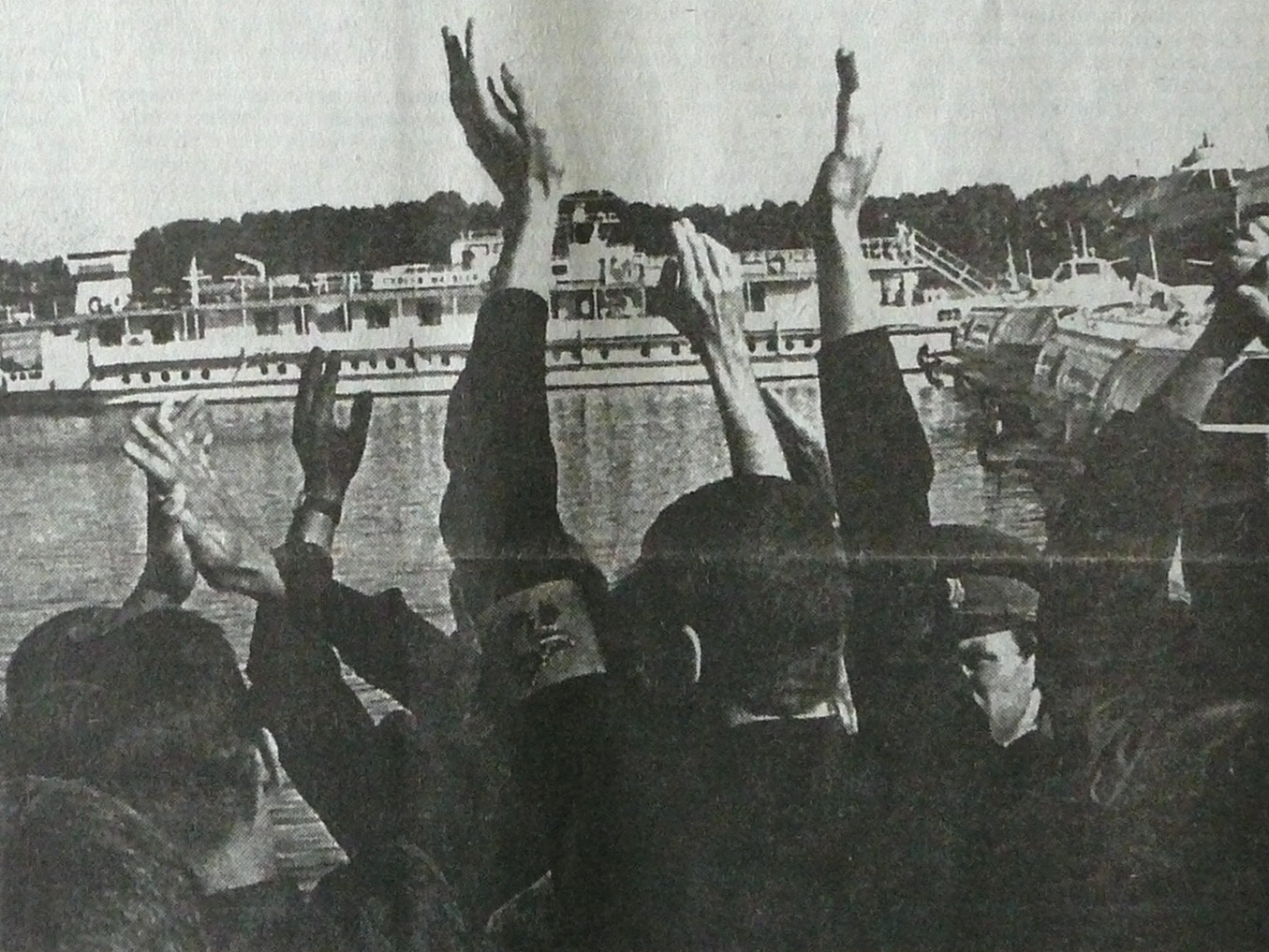
The action of "Oprichniks" in the Kazan River port on August 13, 1993, during the meeting of the ship with Sazhi Umalatova and Stanislav Terekhov

The main inspirer of the creation and leader of the Oprichny Dvor was a local leader of the national-radical wing, the former pastor of the Baptist Church Mikhail Yuryevich Glukhov (born in 1960).

The organization itself was viewed by him as an elite political unit, whose members - the "oprichniks" - were supposed to form the ideological core of the future "National Socialist Russian Workers' Party".

As an emblem, members of the Oprichny Dvor used the image of the distinctive attribute of the oprichnina army of the Russian Tsar Ivan IV the Terrible - "a dog's head and a broom", which was placed on a red armband. A dog's head with an open mouth symbolized the readiness to gnaw out internal treason in the person of Boris Yeltsin's regime and its supporters - corrupt officials, criminals and "pseudo-democrats", and the broomstick symbolized the intention to sweep foreign invaders out of Russia.

The «Oprichniks» advocated the establishment of a "new order" in the country based on national-state dictatorship and military-police discipline, for strict state control over the economy, spoke out in support of the army, law enforcement agencies and state security agencies, and also declared special sympathy for the workers.

== Organization composition ==
The organization consisted mainly of young people.

«Basically, - emphasized M. Yu. Glukhov in an interview given by him in August 1993 to V.V.Kurnosov, - we work with workers, students, the military, the police, the army, the KGB, partly with the director corps, entrepreneurs».

== Termination of activity ==
In a conversation between M. Yu. Glukhov and journalist Artyom Karapetyan, the recording of which was published on January 26, 1994, in the newspaper Izvestiya Tatarstan, the leader of the Kazan "oprichniks" was asked the following question: “You announced the creation of your own party in the press. "Oprichny Dvor". Where is she, what is wrong with her, after all, in theory, the party is the very force that stands behind the leader? " To this M. Yu. Glukhov replied as follows:

«Life has shown that today a party is not required for a political victory; it is enough to have a mobile, efficient support group. I have such a group. These are people who can do their daily routine work.» With the creation in June 1994 in the city of Kazan of the National Socialist Russian Workers' Party, the Oprichny Dvor ceased to exist as an independent organization.

== Books ==
- Alexeyev I. Ye. Russian national movement in the Kazan province and Tatarstan: late XIX - early XXI centuries (vocabulary experience). − Kazan: Publishing House "Master Line", 2004. − С.с. 195 − 196.
