= Social Democratic Party of Russia (2012) =

Social Democratic Party of Russia Социал-демократическая партия России
- Abbreviation: SDPR
- Leader: Sirazhdin Ramazanov
- Founders: Viktor Militarev; Andrei Bogdanov
- Registered: 29 May 2012
- Dissolved: 18 June 2019 (deregistered)
- Preceded by: Social Democratic Party of the Russian Federation
- Headquarters: Gorodskaya 1, Moscow
- Ideology: Social democracy
- Political position: Centre-left
- National affiliation: Coordination Council
- Colours: Red; Green
- Slogan: "Freedom, justice, solidarity" (Russian: «Свобода, справедливость, солидарность»)

Website
- s-dpr.ru

The Social Democratic Party of Russia (Russian: Социал-демократическая партия России, romanized: Sotsial-demokraticheskaya partiya Rossii; SDPR) was a Russian center-left political party founded by political strategist Andrei Bogdanov in 2012. The party was officially disbanded in 2019.

== History ==
On March 21, 2012, the Chairman of the All-Russian public movement "Union of Social Democrats" Mikhail Gorbachev at a press conference in Interfax, said that the intention to recreate the Social Democratic Party of Russia was planned by businessman-politician Alexander Lebedev, who participated in a number of projects Gorbachev -Foundation. Gorbachev himself did not plan to lead the party, according to him, the party should have been headed by a new person

In 2012, political strategist Andrei Bogdanov, ahead of the leader of the Union of Social Democrats and former co-chairman of the party Mikhail Gorbachev, and on May 21, 2012, the Ministry of Justice of Russia officially registered the eponymous "Social Democratic Party of Russia" (without the participation of Mikhail Gorbachev) under chaired by publicist Viktor Militarev, which was later headed by Sirazhdin Ramazanov. The party has participated in a number of regional election campaigns.

In July 2012, the party participated in the creation of a Coordination Council - an association of parties created or recreated by Bogdanov: Communist Party of Social Justice, Democratic Party of Russia, People's Party of Russia and Union of Citizens.

On June 14, 2019, the Supreme Court liquidated the party.

== Party goals ==
According to the party's charter, it had the following goals:

- The Social Democratic Party of Russia believes that care and solidarity should reign in Russian society.
- Social Democrats are convinced that for the majority of members of society it is vitally important not only to improve their well-being, but also to raise the standard of living of those around them, to strive for general well-being.
- The viability and development of a people are possible only in a society where advanced successful people are not pulled back, and the weak are not left to their fate.
- In a society where the center invests in the periphery, where the strong help the weak, and the wealthier support those whose life was not so successful.
- Our own state has a price that we all have to pay, but when distributing this responsibility, we must take into account the abilities of each and the ability to contribute, to bear our burden.
- A just state offers its citizens, who are in a difficult situation, help and protection from all dangers, including the arbitrariness of the authorities.
- A just state protects the constitutional rights of all people.
- A fair state ensures that the work of men and women, young and old, rural and urban residents is valued equally.
- The state should be honest and transparent, everyone should understand that their contribution goes to the piggy bank of general well-being and security, to the creation of a just society.
