= Culture of Ossetia =

Culture in Osetia

The culture of Ossetia includes a range of rituals, customs and language distinctions specific to the region of Ossetia in the Caucasus, divided between Russia and Georgia, and inhabited primarily by the Ossetians, an Iranian ethnic group. The Ossetian culture combines traces of ancient Iranian, Scythian, and Caucasian traditions.

== Language ==
Ossetians speak Ossetian, an Eastern Iranian language, which has two major dialects: Digor and Iron. The written form of Ossetian is based on the Cyrillic alphabet, with additional characters to represent unique Ossetian sounds. Ossetian literature dates back to the 18th century, and prominent authors include Kosta Khetagurov and Nart Sagalayev.

== Religion ==
The majority of Ossetians adhere to Eastern Orthodox Christianity, which was introduced to the region in the 10th century. Before the spread of Christianity, Ossetians practiced indigenous religions with elements of Zoroastrianism, Tengrism, and Scythian beliefs. The pre-Christian religious traditions are still preserved in various rituals, festivals, and folklore.

== Customs and traditions ==
Ossetian culture places great importance on hospitality, respect for elders, and strong family ties. Traditional Ossetian families are patriarchal and consist of several generations living under one roof. The family's male head holds the primary authority, and women are responsible for maintaining the household and raising children.

Ossetians celebrate numerous festivals and holidays, some of which have pre-Christian origins. One such event is the Khetagurov Day, commemorating the life of the Ossetian poet Kosta Khetagurov, and is marked by feasting, dancing, and reciting his poems. Another significant holiday is St. George's Day, celebrated in honor of St. George, the patron saint of Ossetia.

Marriages are traditionally arranged by the couple's parents, with a preference for close kin, especially among the rural population. Wedding ceremonies are elaborate affairs, with singing, dancing, and feasting that can last for several days. The bride and groom dress in traditional Ossetian clothing, and the wedding rituals involve various symbolic acts to ensure a prosperous and happy life for the newlyweds.

=== Cuisine ===
Ossetian cuisine is a diverse mix of indigenous ingredients and culinary influences from neighboring regions. The staple foods include grains, dairy products, meat, and vegetables. The most famous Ossetian dish is the Ossetian pie, called "фыдджын" (fyddzhin) or "хъодз" (khodz), made from layers of thinly rolled dough filled with a variety of ingredients, such as cheese, meat, or vegetables. Other popular dishes include "сæрмæ" (saermae), a dish of stuffed cabbage leaves, and "балдж" (baldzh), a thick soup made from beans, barley, and meat.

=== Music and dance ===
Traditional Ossetian music is characterized by the use of various musical instruments, such as the "фандыр" (fandyr), a long-necked stringed instrument, the "джига" (dzhiga), a type of flute, and the "шалыш" (shalish), a percussion instrument. Polyphonic singing, where multiple vocal parts are performed simultaneously, is a distinctive feature of Ossetian music.
