= Ossetian nationalism =

Ethnic nationalist ideology

Ossetian national flag

Ossetian nationalism is an ideology promoting Ossetian national identity, the Ossetian language and culture.

== History ==
Ossetian national mythology traces the Ossetians’ ancestry to the first Iranian people to reach the Caucasus region, the ancient Scythians, who arrived to the North Caucasus by the 8th century B.C.E. Others claim that Ossetians are descended from the Sarmatians, who arrived to the region five centuries later. Various Ossetian scholars regard Alans as the ancestors of the modern Ossetians.

The Ossetian national ideology is rooted in the works of 19th century Ossetian scholar and poet Kosta Khetagurov, generally considered to be a founder of Ossetian literature. Khetagurov with his followers restandartized Ossetian script with a goal of uniting all groups speaking Ossetian language. Their national ideology was called farn and they argued for distinctiveness of Ossetian people and considered Orthodox Christian faith to be its important feature.

The incipient collapse of the Soviet Union in the 1980s triggered projects of identity-building among many of its constituent nations. In Ossetia, as in other nations, this involved the recovery of an "authentic national religion" harking back to pre-Christian times. The revival of Ossetian folk religion as an organised religious movement was initially accorded the formal name Ætsæg Din (Æцæг Дин, "True Faith") in 1980s by a group of nationalist intellectuals who in the early 1990s constituted the sacerdotal Styr Nykhas ("Great Council").

According to Victor Shnirelman, in the Ossetian case certain traditions had survived with unbroken continuity and were revived in rural areas. This contrasts, and interacts, with an urban and more intellectual movement which elaborated a systematic revived religion associated with ethnic nationalism and with the opposition to both Russian and Georgian Orthodox Christianity, perceived as foreign, and to Islam, professed by the neighbouring Turkic and Caucasian ethnic groups and by a small minority of Ossetians. According to the scholar Sergey Shtyrkov, intellectual projects for the elaboration of an "ethnic religion" for the Ossetians date back to the early twentieth century, and it was with the Soviet atheist anti-religious "furious fight against Ossetian Paganism" in the 1950s that the idea appealed once again to Ossetian intellectuals. According to him it was Soviet anti-religious activism that drove ancient local practices from the sphere of "ethnic tradition" into the sphere of "religion" in the minds of the Ossetian people.

Ossetian nationalism played a significant role in 1980s and 1990s, powered by ethnic conflicts for lands and resources with Ingush people in North Ossetia's borderland Prigorodny District, and for irredentism in South Ossetia, a territory historically part of Georgia. During the collapse of the Soviet Union, Ossetian nationalism became a political force in South Ossetia galvanized by Russian support for separatist movements in ex-Soviet republics, including Georgia. In the late 1980s, the Ossetian nationalist organization, Adamon Nikhas (Voice of the People) was established. In September 1990, South Ossetian Autonomous Oblast declared the independence from Georgia, which led to the First South Ossetian War, won by Ossetian nationalists.

During the Russo-Georgian War, Ossetian nationalists were assisted by Russian Armed Forces against the Georgian government as the conflict took on high intensity. After the war, the independence of South Ossetia-Alania was recognized by the Russian Federation. The victory of Russian and Ossetian forces also led to mass expulsions of ethnic Georgians living in South Ossetia-Alania. In total, at least 20,000 Georgians are forcibly displaced from South Ossetia.

Ossetian nationalists have the particularity of being strongly Russophiles, partly because Russia, under the Tsarist, Soviet and then federal eras, has always defended the promotion of Ossetian identity. Thus during the Russo-Ukrainian War, South Ossetian nationalists took part in the Russian invasion of Ukraine in 2022.

Ossetian nationalism also involves appreciation of æghdaw, a set of cultural and social norms of Ossetians.

Despite being part of the same ethnic group, the South and North Ossetians don't necessarily perceive each other as the same, for example, the South Ossetians refugees to North Ossetia during and after the 1991–1992 South Ossetia war were met with dislike by many among North Ossetians, who disparagingly called them "Gamsiks" (after then president of Georgia Zviad Gamsakhurdia). Some have characterized this as an expression of North Ossetian nationalism in relation to South Ossetians. The tensions emerged amidst the issues such as the distribution of housing and the rise of crime.
