= Andrey Ivanovich Kolganov =

Soviet Russian economist

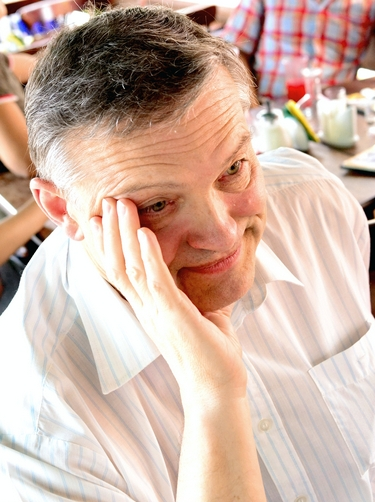
- Occupation: Economist

Andrey (Andrei) Ivanovich Kolganov (Russian: Андрей Иванович Колганов; born 22 May 1955 in Kaliningrad) is a Soviet Russian economist. Doktor Nauk (1990), Professor at the Lomonosov Moscow State University, Principal Researcher at the Russian Academy of Sciences. He is also an opinion journalist and a fiction writer.

He graduated from the MSU Faculty of Economics in 1976. Candidate of Sciences (1979), Doktor Nauk (1990). In 2013, he received the title of Professor. Since 1979, he has worked at the Lomonosov Moscow State University.

He was a member of the Central Committee of the Communist Party of the Russian Soviet Federative Socialist Republic (1990).

He published in Russian Journal of Philosophical Sciences, Voprosy Ekonomiki.

Kolganov is a Marxist. He was a member of the Communist Party of the Soviet Union (since 1990).

Kolganov is the author of more than 350 published works.

== Works ==
- Aleksandr Buzgalin, Andrey Kolganov. Global Capital. In 2 volumes. M.: URSS, 2015. V. 1. In Russian.
- Aleksandr Buzgalin, Andrey Kolganov. Global Capital. In 2 volumes. M.: URSS, 2015. V. 2. In Russian.

== Sources ==
- Колганов Андрей Иванович | Летопись Московского университета
