= FSM =

FSM may refer to:

== Government ==
- Free school meals, a social program
- Public Security Forces of Macao, Macau's public security body, abbreviated as FSM in Portuguese
- Submarine forces (France) (French: Forces sous-marines), a component of the French Navy

== Media and entertainment ==
- FIFA Soccer Manager, a video game
- Fighting Spirit Magazine, a professional wrestling magazine
- Film Score Monthly, an online magazine and former record label
- Free Software Magazine, an American online computer magazine
- Fox Sports Midwest, now Bally Sports Midwest, an American television channel

== Organizations ==
=== Business ===
- Fabryka Samochodów Małolitrażowych, a Polish automotive company
- Fenway Sports Management, an American sports marketing agency
- Five Seven Music, an American record label
- Fine Scale Miniatures, a defunct model railroad producer
- Fortuna Silver Mines, a Canadian mining company
- Franklin & South Manchester, a model railroad producer
- Free Spirit Media, a mass media company in Chicago, Illinois, United States
- Fuel Supplies Maldives, a subsidiary of the State Trading Organization of the Maldives

=== Education ===
- Fanattic Sports Museum, a sports museum in Kolkata, India
- Feinberg School of Medicine, at Northwestern University, Chicago, Illinois, United States
- Fiji School of Medicine, a tertiary institution based in Suva, Fiji
- Friends School of Minnesota, a primary school in Saint Paul, Minnesota, United States
- Frost School of Music, at University of Miami, Florida, United States

=== Politics ===
- Federation of Socialist Youth, a former socio-political organization in Russia
- Five Star Movement, a political party in Italy
- Madrilenian Socialist Federation (Spanish: Federación Socialista Madrileña), the branch of the Spanish Socialist Workers' Party in Madrid, Spain
- Mauritian Solidarity Front (French: Front Solidarité Mauricien), a political party in Mauritius
- Socialist Federation of Martinique (French: Fédération socialiste de Martinique), a political party in Martinique

=== Other ===
- Football Association of Macedonia (Serbian: Fudbalski Sojuz na Makedonija), now called the Football Federation of Macedonia
- Foundation Secours Mondial, a defunct American charity organization
- Franciscan Sisters of Mary, a religious congregation in St. Louis, Missouri, United States
- Friends of Science in Medicine, an Australian health organization

== Places ==
- Federated States of Micronesia, an island country in Oceania
- Fatih Sultan Mehmet Bridge, in Istanbul, Turkey
- Fort Smith Regional Airport, in Arkansas, United States
- Fred and Sara Machetanz Building, at Matanuska–Susitna College in Palmer, Alaska, United States

== Religion and philosophy ==
- Flying Spaghetti Monster, the deity of Pastafarianism
- Field Staff Member, a position at the church of Scientology

== Science and mathematics ==
- Fast sweeping method, in applied mathematics
- Finite-state machine, in computer science
- Force spectrum microscopy, in physics
- Folded spectrum method, in mathematics
- Free-surface modelling, in physics
- Frequency specific microcurrent, in pseudoscience
- Samarium monofluoride, by its chemical formula (FSm)

== Technology and management ==
- AN/FSM, a series of electronics employed by the United States military
- Factory service manual, a type of guide for technical products
- Fast steering mirror, a mirror used in optics to compensate for tilt
- Fecal sludge management, in sanitation
- Field service management, in business management
- First surface mirror, a type of mirror
- Fixed Survey Meter, a radiation detector
- Flail space model, in transportation safety
- Free software movement, a technology-related social movement
- FSM100xx 5G Modem, a modem manufactured by Qualcomm
- Functional Service Module, a propulsion module on the Soviet space station module Kvant-1
- Functional size measurement, a software business functionality metric developed by IFPUG
- Functional sizing method, an approach to software sizing

== Other uses ==
- Free Speech Movement, a student protest movement in the United States
- Food Safety System Manager, a profession designation of the European Organization for Quality
- Field Survival Manual, a field manual used for training of survival techniques

== See also ==
- Food Safety Management System
