= Socialist Resistance (Russia) =

Socialist Resistance Социалистическое сопротивление
- Abbreviation: SocSopr (English); СоцСопр (Russian)
- Leader: Collective leadership
- Founded: 1998
- Dissolved: 7 March 2011
- Preceded by: Committee for Workers' Democracy and International Socialism
- Merged into: Russian Socialist Movement
- Succeeded by: Socialist League Vpered; Socialist Alternative
- Headquarters: Moscow, Russia
- Newspaper: Left Vanguard (1998–2007), Socialist
- Ideology: Socialism; Trotskyism
- Political position: Far-left
- International affiliation: Committee for a Workers' International
- Colours: Red
- Slogan: "Struggle! Solidarity! Socialism!" (Russian: "Борьба! Солидарность! Социализм!")

Website
- socsopr.ru

The Socialist Resistance (SocSopr; Russian: Социалистическое сопротивление; СоцСопр; Sotsialisticheskoye soprotivleniye, SotsSopr) was a Russian Trotskyist political organization. It was active in a number of cities. Until November 21, 2009, it was the Russian section of the Committee for a Workers' International. On March 7, 2011, Socialist Resistance merged with the Socialist League "Vpered" to form a new organization – the Russian Socialist Movement.

== Ideological principles ==
Socialist Resistance was based on a number of program documents. The Platform of the CWI Section in the CIS described the party as "Realizing that they are part of a single international proletarian movement, the successor of its glorious internationalist traditions, the CIS CWI section has developed this document taking into account the experience of the First International (International Workingmen's Association), the experience and mistakes of the Second International, relying on the program documents of the first four congresses of the Third International (Comintern), the founding congress of the Fourth International, theoretical documents of the Committee for a Workers' International ".

According to the position of the organization, socialism was not built either in the USSR, China, North Korea, in Cuba, or in the countries of Eastern Europe. Despite active criticism of the nature of the USSR, its collapse is viewed as a defeat not only of the working class of the countries that have emerged in the post-Soviet space, but also of the entire international labor movement. According to the Socialist Resistance, the elements of the planned economy in the USSR, despite the shortcomings caused by the arbitrariness and incompetence of the bureaucracy, seem to be more socially effective in comparison with the economic systems of capitalist states.

== History ==
In 1990, a section of the Committee for a Workers' International (CWI) in the Soviet Union was created – the Committee for Workers' Democracy and International Socialism (KRDMS), which in 1998 was renamed the Socialist Resistance organization.

During 2006–2007, the Socialist Resistance participated in the Union for Workers' Democracy (URD), which included the RWP, the Marxist group Workers' Democracy Democracy (MGRD, Saint Petersburg) and the Revolutionary Alternative movement ( Tver). Later, in 2007, the “Revolutionary Alternative” decided to merge with the Socialist Resistance. In addition, the group that broke away from the RWP also joined the Socialist Resistance.

In the fall of 2009, the Socialist Resistance was excluded from the CWI, supporters of the international began to act under the name of the Russian section of the Committee for a workers' international. Since 2009, the closest cooperation of the "Socialist Resistance" at the interregional level was carried out with the Socialist League Vpered.

On March 6, 2011, a conference of the "Socialist Resistance" took place, which decided to dissolve. The next day, March 7, the founding conference of the Russian Socialist Movement (RSM) was held, the basis of which was the Socialist League Vpered and the Socialist Resistance. The new organization is focused on building, together with other leftist associations in Russia, a broad anti-capitalist party. Representatives of the Left Front, the Institute of Globalization and Social Movements, the St. Petersburg Federation of Socialist Youth, the Resistance Movement named after Petr Alexeev and the French New Anticapitalist Party also took part in the founding conference of the RSM.

== Activities ==
The "Socialist Resistance" actively worked in the Russian trade union movement, was the organizer of solidarity campaigns with participants in strikes and activists who were subjected to repression. Considerable attention was paid to actions of international solidarity, pickets were held at the embassies of foreign states. In addition, summer camps were held in various regions of Russia, as well as theoretical schools.

From the end of 2005 – beginning of 2006, activists of the Yaroslavl city organization "Socialist Resistance", together with the Movement of Hostels in Moscow and the Moscow Region, have been working to create the Movement of Hostels in Yaroslavl. A number of rallies, actions, and leaflet campaigns took place in Yaroslavl. On February 4, 2006, the constituent conference of the Yaroslavl Hostels Movement is held, at which a coordination council is formed from representatives of 23 Yaroslavl hostels. In December 2007, in Yaroslavl, on the initiative of the CPRF and the Socialist Resistance with the participation of the Institute "Collective Action", a public movement "Housing Solidarity" was created to unite citizens in order to fight for their rights in the field of housing and communal services.

Activists of the Perm city organization "Socialist Resistance" played a major role in the activities of the "Student Defense" movement. As a result of the mass protest campaign, which took place from December 2007 to August 2008, the deputies of the City Duma canceled their own decision to cancel the travel concessionary pass for Perm students.

== Information bodies and publications ==
From 1998 to 2007, the organization published the newspaper "Left Avangard" with variable frequency. Since October 2007, the monthly newspaper "Socialist" has been published. The organization's activists constantly wrote and published brochures on topical topics. During 2007, the “FAQ. Socialism in Questions and Answers "," We and They – Truth and Myths about Immigrants "," Grapes of Anger. Popular uprising in the suburbs of Almaty "," Education for the people! ". Within the framework of the Union for Workers' Democracy, activists of the organization participated in the publication of the newspaper Rabochaya Vlast.

A leaflet with the title complex "Let those who created it pay for the crisis!", Including the SotsSopr logo located at the bottom of the page and the name of the organization "Socialist Resistance (Section of the Committee for the Workers' International in the CIS)" (with the website addresses and Internet mail, mobile phone number in Tver) was included in the Federal List of Extremist Materials by the decision of the Zavolzhsky District Court of Tver on August 28, 2009.

== Books and brochures ==
- Close the IMF! — Voronezh, 2001.
- The Grapes of Wrath. Popular uprising in the suburbs of Almaty. — М., 2007. — 96 p.
- Doyle K. 1968. Revolution month. Lessons from the general strike — М., 1993.
- A new stage in the development of world capitalism and the international labor movement. Theses of the international executive committee CWI. Newport. December 2005. / Transl. from english I. Yasin. — М., 2006. — 24 с.
- Education for the people. The fight is just beginning / Comp. S. A. Kozlovsky. — М., 2006. — 16 с.
- Ovsyannikov I. A. World resistance. View from the top of Belfort. — М., 2006. — 16 с.
- Ovsyannikov I. A. We and "they". Truth and myths about immigrants. — М., 2006. — 16 с.
- Ovsyannikov I. A. Why Socialism? — М., 2006. — 36 с.
- Ovsyannikov I., Shibanov I. FAQ. Socialism in questions and answers — М., 2007. — 24 с.
- Hands off education! / Ed. I. A. Ovsyannikov, S. A. Kozlovsky. — Yaroslavl—Moscow, 2005. — 47 с.
- "Socialist Resistance". Program documents. — М., 2008. — 30 с.
- Student Defense: A Marxist Analysis of the Pass Campaign and Further Perspectives. — Perm: "Socialist Resistance", 2008. — 12 с.
- Third Congress of the CWI Section in the CIS. Documents and materials. — Voronezh, 2001.
- Fourth Congress of the CWI Section in the CIS. Moscow, 27—27 February 2006. documents and materials. — М., 2006. — 28 с.

== See also ==
- Revolutionary Workers' Party
- Socialist League Vpered
- Committee for Workers' Democracy and International Socialism
- Socialist Resistance of Kazakhstan
