= Terrell Owens =

American football player (born 1973)

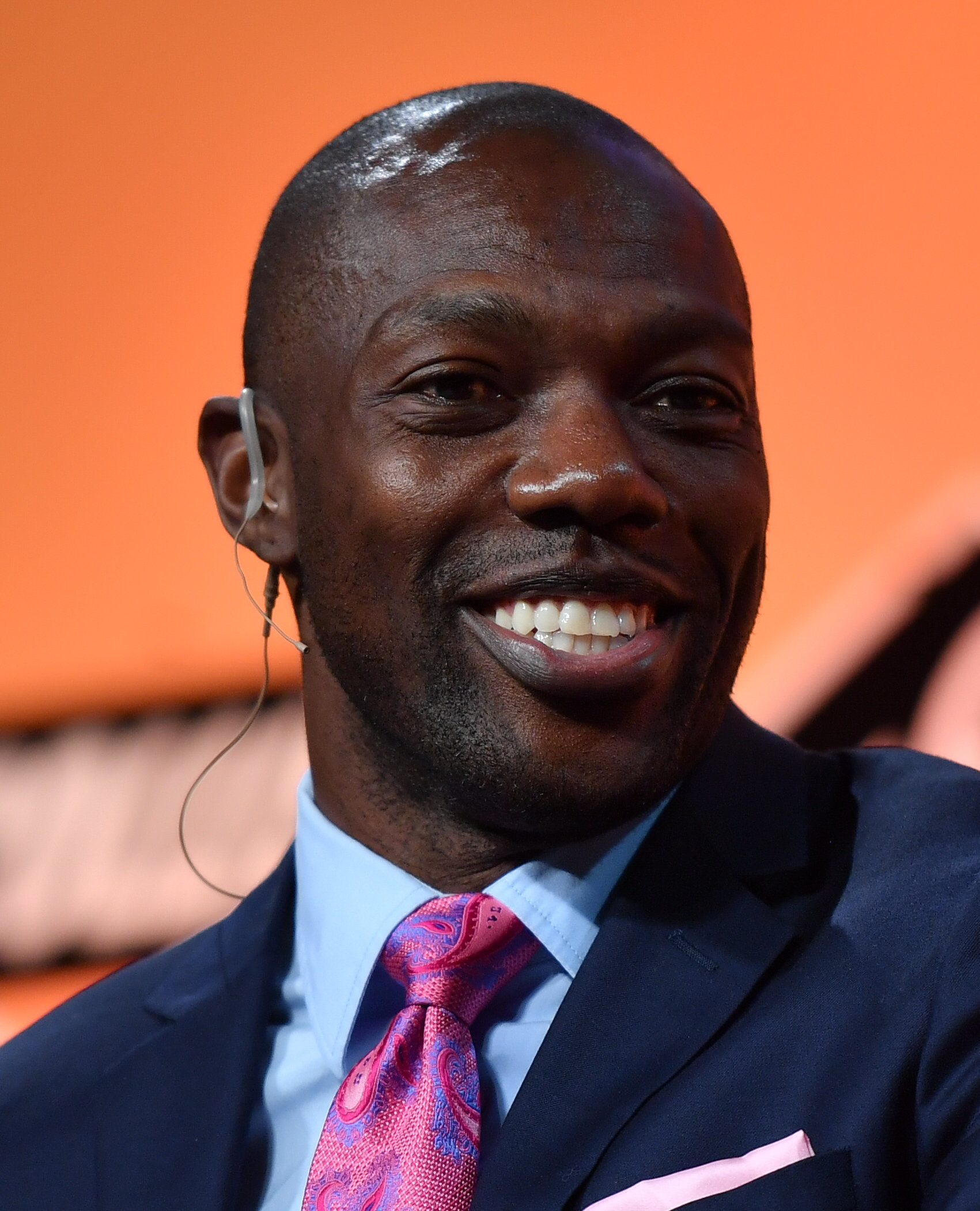
- Owens in New Orleans in 2017

No. 81
- Position: Wide receiver

Personal information
- Born: December 7, 1973 (age 52); Alexander City, Alabama, U.S.
- Listed height: 6 ft 3 in (1.91 m)
- Listed weight: 224 lb (102 kg)

Career information
- High school: Benjamin Russell (Alexander City)
- College: Chattanooga (1992–1995)
- NFL draft: 1996: 3rd round, 89th overall pick

Career history
- San Francisco 49ers (1996–2003); Philadelphia Eagles (2004–2005); Dallas Cowboys (2006–2008); Buffalo Bills (2009); Cincinnati Bengals (2010); Allen Wranglers (2012); Seattle Seahawks (2012)*; FCF Zappers (2022)
- * Offseason or practice squad member only

Awards and highlights
- 5× First-team All-Pro (2000–2002, 2004, 2007); 6× Pro Bowl (2000–2004, 2007); 3× NFL receiving touchdowns leader (2001, 2002, 2006); NFL 2000s All-Decade Team; San Francisco 49ers Hall of Fame

Career NFL statistics
- Receptions: 1,078
- Receiving yards: 15,934
- Receiving touchdowns: 153
- Stats at Pro Football Reference
- Pro Football Hall of Fame

Terrell Eldorado Owens (/ˈtɛrəl/; born December 7, 1973) is an American former professional football wide receiver who played in the National Football League (NFL) for 15 seasons. Nicknamed T. O., he ranks third in NFL career receiving yards and receiving touchdowns. He is regarded as one of the greatest wide receivers of all time.

Owens played college football for the Chattanooga Mocs and was selected in the third round of the 1996 NFL draft by the San Francisco 49ers. He was a member of the team for seven seasons until he was traded to the Philadelphia Eagles in 2004. Two years later, he signed with the Dallas Cowboys, where he spent three seasons. Owens' NFL career concluded after one season each with the Buffalo Bills and Cincinnati Bengals. He later played for the Allen Wranglers of the Indoor Football League (IFL) in 2012 and last played professionally with Fan Controlled Football (FCF) in 2022.

A six-time Pro Bowl and five-time first-team All-Pro selection, Owens also created a significant amount of controversy during his professional career and attracted attention for his flamboyant touchdown celebrations. He was inducted to the Pro Football Hall of Fame in 2018.

== Early life ==
Owens was born to Marilyn Heard and her neighbor L.C. Russell in Alexander City, Alabama. At 10 years old, he discovered his father's identity after liking his daughter, only to learn that she was his sister. He grew up with three other siblings and was raised by his mother and grandmother. He enjoyed watching football, especially his favorite player, Jerry Rice. However, Owens' grandmother initially forbade him from playing sports until high school. Owens attended Benjamin Russell High School, where he participated in football, baseball, track, and basketball. Owens did not start on his high school football team until his junior year, when one of his teammates missed a game due to illness.

== College career ==
While enrolled at the University of Tennessee at Chattanooga, Owens played basketball, football, and ran track. Owens played in the 1995 NCAA basketball tournament. He became a starter during his sophomore year. Owens caught 38 passes for 724 yards and eight touchdowns during his sophomore year, and 34 passes for 357 yards and three touchdowns during his junior year. Having gained respect in the NCAA, Owens faced double coverage more frequently during his senior year, and was limited to 43 receptions for 667 yards and one touchdown. Owens previously held the single-season receptions record at Chattanooga until it was broken in 2007 by Alonzo Nix. In his senior year, he anchored the school's 4 × 100 relay team at the NCAA championship. He also participated in the Senior Bowl, a college all-star game played by college seniors, in preparation for the NFL Draft.

== Professional career ==
Pre-draft measurables
Height	Weight	Arm length	Hand span	40-yard dash	10-yard split	20-yard split	20-yard shuttle	Vertical jump	Broad jump
6 ft 2 7/8 in (1.90 m)	213 lb (97 kg)	34 1/2 in (0.88 m)	10 1/2 in (0.27 m)	4.63 s	1.58 s	2.72 s	4.26 s	33 in (0.84 m)	10 ft 0 in (3.05 m)
All values from NFL Combine

=== San Francisco 49ers ===
Because he played his college football at UT–Chattanooga, an FCS school that did not have a winning season during his time there, Owens' visibility to NFL scouts was low, and he dropped to the third round of the 1996 NFL draft, where the San Francisco 49ers chose him 89th overall. Owens made his professional debut against the New Orleans Saints, playing on special teams. He caught his first two passes against the Carolina Panthers in Week 4 on September 22, 1996, for a total of six yards. Owens caught his first touchdown on October 20 against the Cincinnati Bengals; a 45-yard pass from Steve Young. He finished his rookie season with 35 receptions for 520 yards and four touchdowns.

After the 49ers' top receiver Jerry Rice suffered a torn ACL early in the 1997 NFL season, Owens took Rice's place in the lineup, beating out former 1st round pick J. J. Stokes for the job. He helped the 49ers win 13 games that season, finishing with 936 receiving yards and eight touchdowns. He scored his first postseason touchdown in a Divisional Round win over the Minnesota Vikings.

1998 saw Owens eclipse 1,000-yards for the first time in his career, catching 67 passes for 1,097 yards and 14 touchdowns. In the Wild Card playoff game, the 49ers faced the Green Bay Packers, who had beaten them five straight times, three of them playoff games. Owens struggled, dropping a number of passes. Despite this, Young kept throwing to Owens and he redeemed himself by catching the game-winning touchdown (immortalized by the impassioned game call of 49ers radio play-by-play announcer Joe Starkey) for a 30–27 comeback victory.

In 1999, Owens' production dropped after Jeff Garcia replaced the injured Steve Young as starting quarterback. He finished the season with 60 catches for 754 yards and four touchdowns.

Owens had a record-breaking day on December 17, 2000, with 20 catches for 283 yards in a 17–0 win over the Chicago Bears. His 20 receptions surpassed a 50-year-old mark held by Tom Fears (which has since been surpassed by Brandon Marshall). Owens finished the year with 97 receptions for 1,451 yards and thirteen touchdowns.

Owens had another strong season in 2001, finishing with 93 receptions for 1,412 yards and 16 touchdowns.

During the 2002 season, Owens had 100 receptions for 1,300 yards and 13 touchdowns. The 49ers hosted the New York Giants in the Wild Card playoff round and after falling behind 38–14, the 49ers scored 25 unanswered points. Owens accounted for two touchdowns and caught two 2-point conversions in the 49ers' 39–38 win. The following week, Owens was held to four catches for 35 yards in a 31–6 loss to the soon-to-be Super Bowl champion Tampa Bay Buccaneers.

In 2003, Owens finished the season with 80 receptions for 1,102 yards and nine touchdowns. The 49ers finished with a 7–9 record in what would be Owens' final season with the team.

In the summer of 2004, Owens appeared in an interview for Playboy magazine, where he was asked about long-standing rumors that his former teammate Garcia was homosexual, to which he implied he thought there might be truth to the rumors.

Although Owens was eager to leave the 49ers, the 49ers asserted that Owens' previous agent, David Joseph, had missed the deadline to void the final years of his contract with the team. The National Football League Players Association and Owens disputed this assertion, contending that the deadline referred to by the 49ers was not the applicable deadline. On March 4, 2004, San Francisco, believing it still held Owens' rights, attempted to trade Owens to the Baltimore Ravens for a second-round pick in the 2004 draft. However, Owens challenged the 49ers' right to make the deal. Owens assumed that he would become a free agent on March 3, and did not believe that the earlier deadline was applicable. Hence, he negotiated with other teams in advance of his expected free agency, and reached a contract agreement with the Philadelphia Eagles. The NFLPA filed a grievance on his behalf.

Before an arbitrator could make a ruling on Owens' grievance, the NFL and the three teams involved in the controversy reached a settlement on March 16, 2004. The Ravens got their second-round pick back from San Francisco, and the 49ers in turn received a conditional fifth-round pick and defensive end Brandon Whiting from the Eagles in exchange for the rights to Owens. Owens' contract with the Eagles was worth about $49 million for seven years, including a $10 million signing bonus.

=== Philadelphia Eagles ===
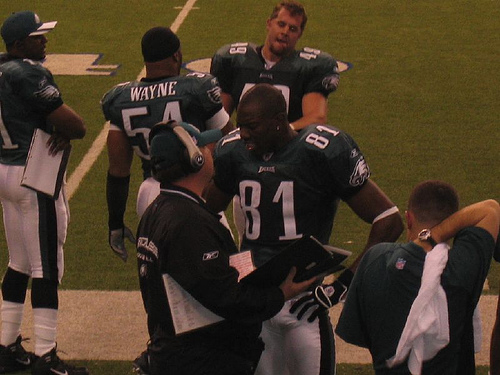
Owens (81) with the Eagles talking to Marty Mornhinweg.

On December 19, 2004, Owens sustained a severely sprained ankle and a fractured fibula when Dallas Cowboys safety Roy Williams took him down with a horse-collar tackle; Williams' horse-collars resulted in injuries to several NFL players, and the horse-collar tackle was later prohibited. Owens' injury required surgery, including insertion of a screw into his leg, and Eagles trainer Rick Burkholder stated that he would miss the rest of the season, with only an outside chance of playing in the Super Bowl if the Eagles advanced.

After the Eagles defeated the Atlanta Falcons in the NFC Championship game, Owens defied the advice of his doctors and played in Super Bowl XXXIX. Owens' trainer, James "Buddy" Primm, helped bring Owens back much sooner with the use of microcurrent and a hyperbaric chamber. Owens started in the game and had nine receptions for 122 yards, but the Eagles lost to the New England Patriots. After the game, Owens stated that the media would have called Brett Favre "a warrior" for playing with such an injury, but that "For me, they said I was selfish."

In April 2005, Owens announced that he had hired a new agent, Drew Rosenhaus, and indicated that he would seek to have his contract with the Eagles renegotiated. Owens made $9 million in 2004 (most of which was bonus money, as his base salary was only $660,000), and was slated to make $4.5 million in 2005. This two-year amount did not place Owens in the top ten paid wide receivers playing. He also made a comment that he "wasn't the guy who got tired in the Super Bowl." The remark, directed at quarterback Donovan McNabb, caused a controversy to heat up between them. On July 1, Owens' relationship with the Eagles became even more tense after Eagles owner Jeffrey Lurie and club president Joe Banner denied Owens permission to play basketball in a summer league under the auspices of the National Basketball Association's Sacramento Kings.

Owens, with the negotiating help of Rosenhaus, continued to lobby for a new contract. Owens and Rosenhaus met with Eagles head coach Andy Reid and president Joe Banner, but no agreement was reached (this was in line with the Eagles' policy against contract renegotiations). Owens threatened to hold out of training camp until a deal was reached, but reported to camp on time. When the 2005 football season began, Owens was in the second year of a seven-year, $49 million contract. However, the contract was heavily back-loaded, and while outlets like Sports Illustrated touted the $49 million figure to mock Owens for wanting more, the money guaranteed to him was under the annual average for a top-tier wide receiver.

Owens and McNabb, to their credit, did not appear to allow the off-the-field controversies to affect their play on the field during the first half of the season: through Week 7 Owens was McNabb's receiving target an average of 13.14 times per game (most in the NFL since 1999 when receiver "targets" were first tracked, and a still-current NFL record as of 2023), with Owens second only to Panthers WR Steve Smith Sr. in receiving touchdowns, receptions, and receiving yards at that point in 2005. McNabb was leading the NFL in several passing categories at that point.

However, after a game against the Dallas Cowboys on October 9 in which the Eagles lost, Owens was seen by reporters wearing a throwback jersey of former Cowboys player Michael Irvin on the team plane. On November 2, Owens was involved in an argument in the training room with team ambassador Hugh Douglas, which led to a fistfight between the two. The argument was reportedly started after Douglas said there were players on the team who were faking injuries.

During an interview with college student journalist Graham Bensinger the next day, Owens made several comments that Eagles fans perceived as verbal jabs at McNabb and the team. In this interview, when asked whether he agreed with a comment made by analyst Michael Irvin saying that the Eagles would be undefeated if Brett Favre was on the team, Owens replied, "That's a good assessment. I would agree with that." Owens went on to state that if Favre were the Eagles quarterback, "I just feel like we'd be in a better situation." Owens stated on his radio show that his remarks were taken out of context, noting that he had just stated two questions prior that the Eagles' record would also be better had McNabb not been injured. While he did not comment on Owens' slight at the time, McNabb later stated in an interview that "It was definitely a slap in the face to me."

Two days after the interview aired, the Eagles suspended Owens indefinitely for "conduct detrimental to the team". According to Owens' agent Drew Rosenhaus, head coach Andy Reid demanded that Owens make a public apology to McNabb. An apology was drafted by Rosenhaus, but Owens balked at reading a specific apology to McNabb, and crossed that part of the statement out. The apology he read on TV did not address McNabb directly. The following day, Reid announced that Owens' suspension would be increased to four games and that he would be deactivated for the remainder of the season.

On November 8, Owens and Rosenhaus held a news conference at Owens' residence, where he apologized to the fans, the team, and McNabb specifically, and also made an appeal for reinstatement to the team. The NFL Players Association filed a grievance against the Eagles, claiming violation of the sport's collective bargaining agreement, but Owens' suspension and deactivation were upheld by an arbitrator.

On March 14, 2006, the Philadelphia Eagles released Owens.

=== Dallas Cowboys ===
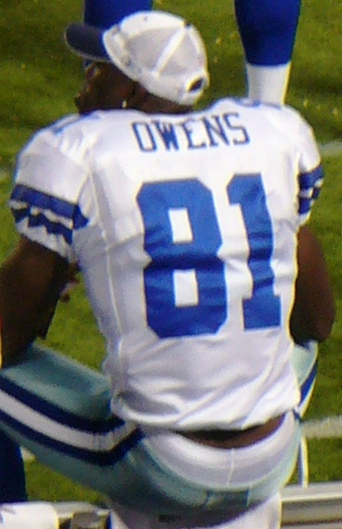
Owens in August 2007

On March 18, 2006, the Dallas Cowboys signed Owens to a 3-year, $25 million deal, including a $5 million signing bonus, with a $5 million first-year salary.

Owens returned to the field during the Cowboys' 2006 season opener against the Jacksonville Jaguars. While the game ended in a Jaguars victory, Owens recorded eight receptions for 80 yards and one touchdown. The following week against the Redskins, Owens broke his finger while blocking, and was forced to leave the game. He had a plate screwed into the finger, and returned to play the team's next game against the Tennessee Titans, where he accounted for 88 receiving yards.

The following week, Owens made his highly anticipated return to Philadelphia, where he played against his former teammate, Donovan McNabb. Upon his return, Owens was met by a hail of angry jeers and taunts, including chants of "O.D." throughout the game. Despite pregame talk about a weak Eagles secondary, Owens struggled throughout the game. Owens had three catches for 45 yards, while the Cowboys went on to lose, 38–24.

After the Cowboys defeated the Atlanta Falcons, 38–28, owner Jerry Jones revealed that Owens had injured a tendon on the same finger that he had broken earlier in the season. The doctors recommended season-ending surgery, but Owens elected to risk permanent damage to his finger and decided to wait until the end of the season to repair the damage. "There's no question about what he's willing to do for his team", Jones said.

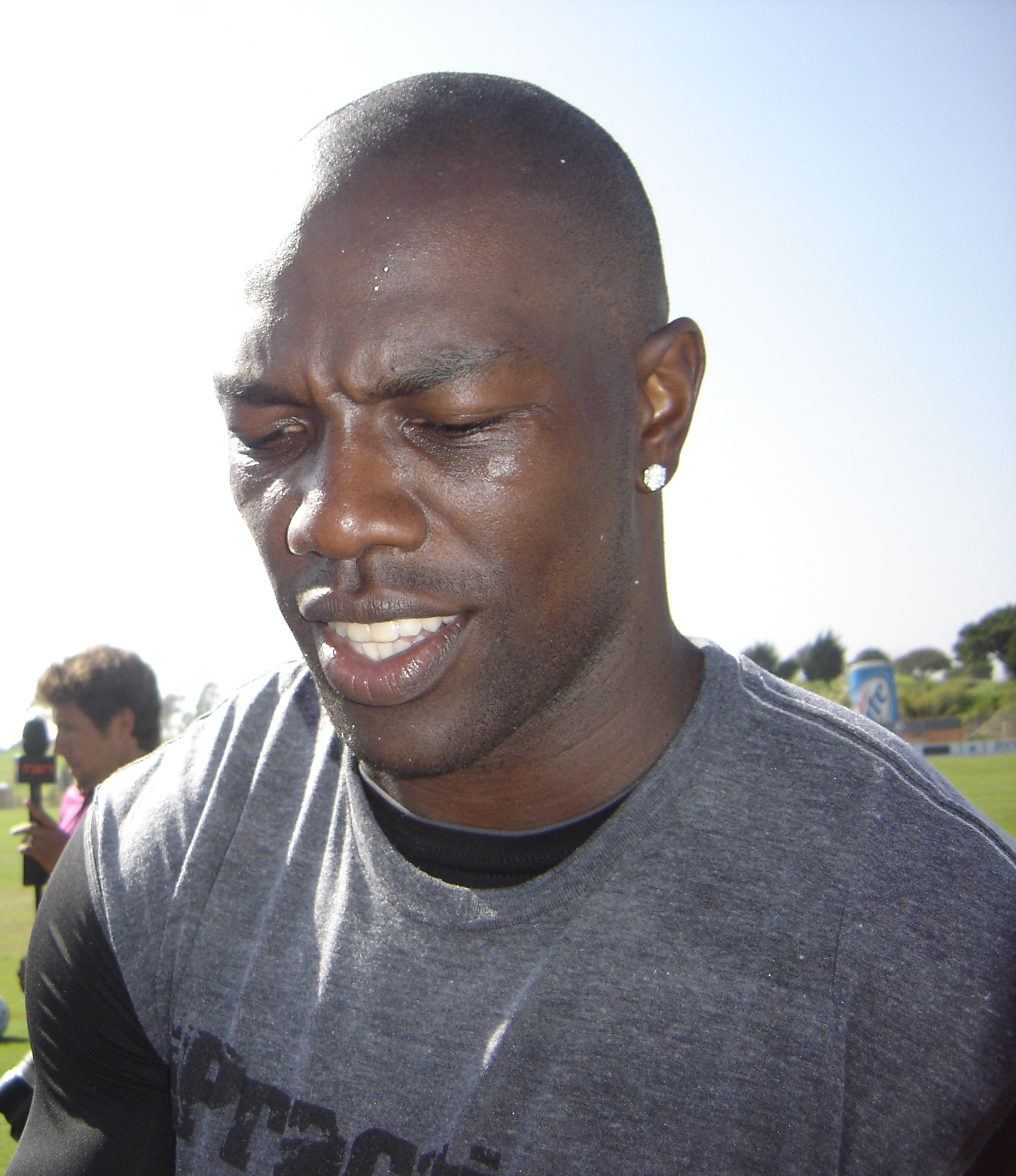
Owens in July 2008

Owens led the league in regular season with 13 touchdown receptions. On March 1, 2007, he underwent surgery twice to repair his right ring finger.

In the 2007 season, Owens and the Cowboys began to live up to their potential. On November 18, Owens set a new career high and tied a franchise record, with four touchdown catches against the Washington Redskins. With his touchdown catch against Green Bay on November 29, Owens became the first player in NFL history with at least one touchdown catch and six receptions in seven straight games. Also with this win, the Cowboys clinched a playoff berth for the second consecutive season, making this the third time Owens would participate in back-to-back postseasons. Owens was one of the starting wide receivers to represent the NFC in the Pro Bowl along with Arizona Cardinals wide receiver Larry Fitzgerald. On January 9, Owens made the All-Pro team along with teammates Jason Witten and DeMarcus Ware. On December 22 in a Week 16 game against the Carolina Panthers, Owens caught his 15th touchdown catch of the season to set a new Cowboys record for touchdown catches in a season. During this game, however, Owens suffered a high ankle sprain after making a catch in the second quarter, which kept him out of the rest of the regular season. Owens was leading the league in receiving yards and was second in receiving touchdowns at the time. He finished the season with 81 receptions, 15 touchdowns, and 1,355 receiving yards, as the team finished 13–3 and clinched the NFC's top seed.

Owens returned for the divisional playoff game against the Giants, where he caught four passes for 49 yards and a touchdown. The Cowboys lost the game, however, 21–17 and Owens broke down crying during the postgame press conference in a now-infamous incident.

In the 2008 Pro Bowl, Owens caught seven passes for 101 yards and two touchdowns in an NFC win. Despite his efforts, Minnesota Vikings rookie running back Adrian Peterson was named MVP.

In the Cowboys' second game of the season, the last Monday Night game at Texas Stadium, Owens passed Cris Carter to move to second in touchdowns behind former teammate Jerry Rice.

The Cowboys released Owens on March 4, 2009. Owens later said that Jones had assured him that he would be remaining with the team and that he was blindsided by his release.

=== Buffalo Bills ===
On March 8, 2009, the Buffalo Bills signed Owens to a 1-year, $6.5 million contract. Owens had his first catch with the Bills when he had a 27-yard play on a 3rd-and-1 in the 25–24 loss to the New England Patriots at Gillette Stadium. With that catch, he passed former Bills receiver Andre Reed on the all-time Top 20 career leaders list for pass receptions. Owens debuted with two catches for 45 yards in the game. Owens caught his first touchdown pass with Buffalo in a 33–20 win over the Tampa Bay Buccaneers on September 20, 2009. However, the following week, Owens was held without a catch against the New Orleans Saints, ending a 185-game streak of consecutive games with a catch that was the longest streak among active players at the time.

Owens had his best game with the Bills in a 15–18 loss to the Jacksonville Jaguars, with nine receptions for 197 yards and a touchdown. Owens and Ryan Fitzpatrick set a Bills record for longest touchdown reception when Fitzpatrick connected with Owens for a 98-yard touchdown, which also became Owens' longest career touchdown reception. He also became the oldest player to have a touchdown reception of more than 76 yards (35 years, 350 days). Against the Atlanta Falcons in Week 16, Owens became the sixth player to reach 1,000 receptions in a career after catching an 8-yard pass from Brian Brohm. He finished his lone season with Buffalo with 55 catches for 829 yards and 5 receiving touchdowns, and also rushed 6 times for 54 yards and a touchdown.

=== Cincinnati Bengals ===
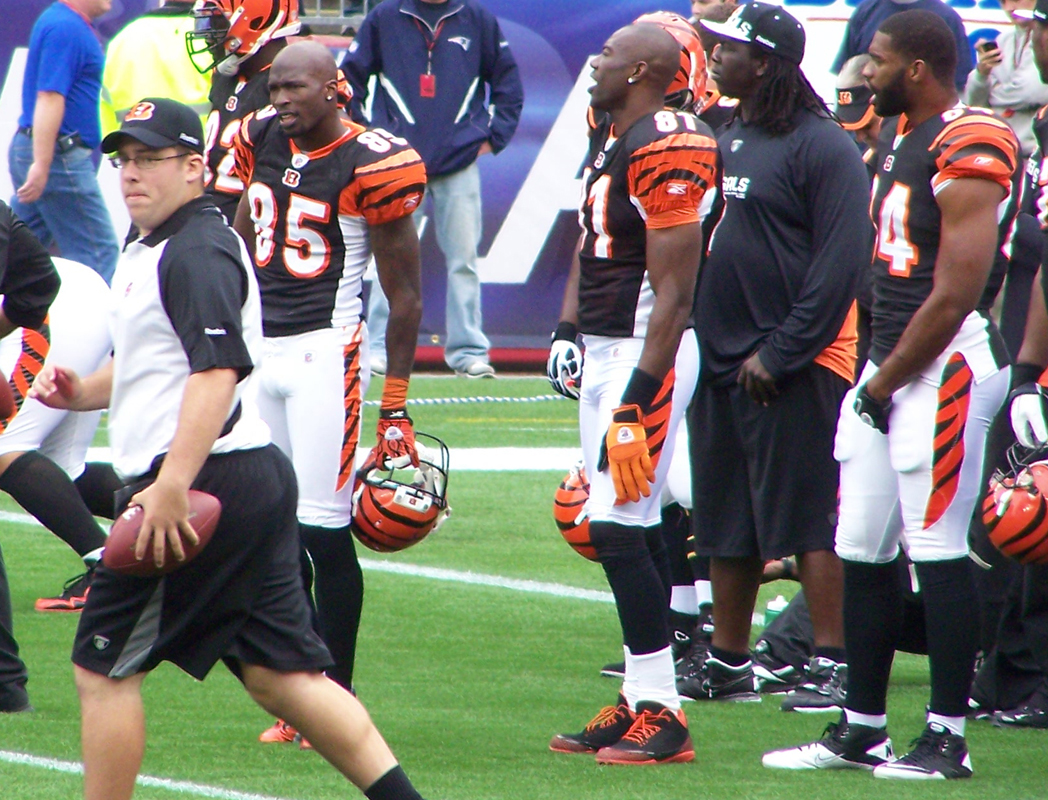
Owens (middle) with Chad Ochocinco before a game against the New England Patriots in September 2010

On July 27, 2010, Owens signed a one-year contract with the Cincinnati Bengals. It was reportedly worth $2 million, with another $2 million possible from bonuses. He joined Carson Palmer and Chad Johnson, both of whom lobbied for the Bengals to sign Owens. With the retirement of Isaac Bruce, Owens spent his last active season in the NFL as the active career leader in receiving yards. He received his customary number, #81, given to him by free-agent acquisition wide receiver Antonio Bryant in exchange for an undisclosed sum of money, some of which went to a charity of Bryant's choice. He was ranked 91st by his fellow players on the NFL Top 100 Players of 2011.

Against the Cleveland Browns in Week 4, he had a spectacular game with ten receptions, 222 yards and a touchdown of 78 yards. On December 21, Owens was placed on injured reserve, for the first time in his 15-year career. He still managed to lead all Bengals' receivers (including Ochocinco) with receptions (72), yards (983), and touchdowns (9) for the season. However, the Bengals fell from a 10–6 record the year before Owens joined to a 4–12 record with Owens. The Bengals decided not to re-sign Owens for the 2011 season.

He suffered a torn ACL during the 2011 offseason and underwent surgery in April 2011. According to his agent, he was cleared to play again on October 19. He held a televised workout on October 25, which no NFL teams chose to attend.

=== Allen Wranglers ===
On November 2, 2011, the Allen Wranglers of the Indoor Football League announced they had extended a six-figure contract offer to Owens to play for the Wranglers in the 2012 season. On January 18, 2012, Owens announced via Twitter that he had accepted the Wranglers' offer and joined their ownership group, with an official press conference to follow the following week. In his debut for the Wranglers, Owens caught three passes for 53 yards and three touchdowns as the Wranglers defeated the Wichita Wild 50–30. His statistics were: eight games played; 35 catches; 420 yards; 52.5 yards per game; 12 yards per catch; 45 longest catch; and ten touchdowns.

On May 29, 2012, Owens was released. The Wranglers' co-owners stated Owens was released for showing a lack of effort both on and off the field.

=== Seattle Seahawks ===
On August 6, 2012, Owens signed a one-year, $925,000 contract with the Seattle Seahawks. He appeared in two preseason games, catching two passes for 41 yards. On August 26, 2012, Owens announced on his Twitter account that the Seahawks had released him.

On January 13, 2015, in an interview with Sports Illustrated Now, Owens stated that he had not retired and that, after a hiatus, he had trained with numerous NFL players during the 2014 NFL season and the offseason. He did not state when he planned to return to the NFL.

=== Flag football ===
On June 28, 2017, Owens played as team captain for Team Owens in the inaugural game for the newly formed American Flag Football League.

=== Canadian Football League ===
On June 19, 2018, the Edmonton Eskimos of the Canadian Football League (CFL) added Owens to their negotiation list. On July 14, Owens activated his 10-day signing window with the Eskimos, requiring the team to offer him a contract in ten days, else he would've become a CFL free agent and be eligible to sign with any of the eight other CFL teams. On July 20, 2018, the Eskimos dropped Owens from their negotiation list. On August 5, 2018, a day after his Hall of Fame induction, Owens worked out for the Saskatchewan Roughriders.

=== Fan Controlled Football ===
On March 31, 2022, Owens signed with Fan Controlled Football. Though FCF players typically rotate through multiple teams in a season, Owens was expected to be given a franchise tag by the Zappers (one of two Zappers franchise players, along with quarterback Johnny Manziel) committing Owens to that team. On May 11, 2022, Owens was traded to the Knights of Degen in a three-team, four-player trade.

On December 28, 2022, it was announced that Owens was in contact with the Dallas Cowboys, as well as other teams, regarding a possible NFL return. However, no deal was reached with Dallas, or any other team.

== Career statistics ==
Legend
	Led the league
**Bold**	Career high

=== NFL ===
==== Regular season ====
Year	Team	Games		Receiving					Rushing					Fumbles	
Year	Team	GP	GS	Rec	Yds	Avg	Lng	TD	Att	Yds	Avg	Lng	TD	Fum	Lost
1996	SF	16	10	35	520	14.9	46	4	—	—	—	—	—	1	1
1997	SF	16	15	60	936	15.6	56	8	—	—	—	—	—	1	0
1998	SF	16	10	67	1,097	16.4	79	14	4	53	**13.3**	21	**1**	1	1
1999	SF	14	14	60	754	12.6	36	4	—	—	—	—	—	1	1
2000	SF	14	13	97	**1,451**	15.0	69	13	3	11	3.7	5	0	**3**	**2**
2001	SF	16	16	93	1,412	15.2	60	**16**	4	21	5.3	12	0	0	0
2002	SF	14	14	**100**	1,300	13.0	76	13	**7**	**79**	11.3	**38**	**1**	0	0
2003	SF	15	15	80	1,102	13.8	75	9	3	−2	−0.7	3	0	0	0
2004	PHI	14	14	77	1,200	15.6	59	14	3	−5	−1.7	6	0	2	1
2005	PHI	7	7	47	763	16.2	91	6	1	2	2.0	2	0	0	0
2006	DAL	16	15	85	1,180	13.9	56	13	—	—	—	—	—	0	0
2007	DAL	15	15	81	1,355	**16.7**	52	15	1	5	5.0	5	0	0	0
2008	DAL	16	16	69	1,052	15.2	75	10	**7**	33	4.7	8	0	1	1
2009	BUF	16	16	55	829	15.1	**98**	5	6	54	9.0	29	**1**	1	0
2010	CIN	14	11	72	983	13.7	78	9	—	—	—	—	—	0	0
Career		219	201	1,078	15,934	14.8	98	153	39	251	6.4	38	3	11	7

==== Postseason ====
Year	Team	Games		Receiving					Fumbles	
Year	Team	GP	GS	Rec	Yds	Avg	Lng	TD	Fum	Lost
1996	SF	2	2	1	7	7.0	7	0	0	0
1997	SF	2	2	10	149	14.9	48	1	0	0
1998	SF	2	2	11	146	13.3	34	1	**2**	**1**
2001	SF	1	1	4	40	10.0	16	0	0	0
2002	SF	2	2	**13**	**212**	**16.3**	**76**	**2**	0	0
2004	PHI	1	1	9	122	13.6	36	0	0	0
2006	DAL	1	1	2	26	13.0	14	0	0	0
2007	DAL	1	1	4	49	12.3	20	1	0	0
Career		12	12	54	751	13.9	76	5	2	1

=== Other leagues ===
Year	League	Team	GP	Receiving					Rushing					Fumbles	
Year	League	Team	GP	Rec	Yds	Avg	Lng	TD	Att	Yds	Avg	Lng	TD	Fum	Lost
2012	IFL	ALN	8	35	420	12.0	45	10	—	—	—	—	—	—	—
2022	FCF	ZAP	3	7	93	13.3	26	2	—	—	—	—	—	—	—

=== College ===
Season	Team	GP	Receiving			
Season	Team	GP	Rec	Yds	Avg	TD
1992	Chattanooga	2	6	97	16.2	1
1993	Chattanooga	11	38	724	**19.1**	**8**
1994	Chattanooga	10	**57**	**836**	14.7	6
1995	Chattanooga	11	43	661	15.4	4
College totals		34	144	2,318	16.1	19

== Personal life ==
Owens is the father of two daughters and two sons. In September 2011, Owens was sued by Melanie Paige Smith III, the mother of his daughter, for failure to pay child support, but the case was settled prior to trial. Owens insisted that the reason for the missed child support payments was due to his wages decreasing in the NFL and Smith was aware of his circumstances.

His daughter Kylee plays volleyball at Prairie View A&M University. His son, Terique, is also a wide receiver.

In September 2004, Owens released an autobiography: Catch This! Going Deep with the NFL's Sharpest Weapon, which he co-wrote with bestselling author Stephen Singular.

On a May 8, 2012, episode of Dr. Phil, three of the four mothers to his children accused Owens of either coming up short in his monthly child support payments or not paying at all. Owens said he was paying some $45,000 per month in child support at one time.

Owens is a Christian. He was raised as a Christian by his grandmother and has been baptized.

On October 16, 2023, Owens was hit by a car in Calabasas, California, after being in an argument following a pick-up basketball game. He was not injured.

== Controversies ==
=== Desperate Housewives skit ===
On November 15, 2004, Owens, wearing a Philadelphia Eagles uniform, appeared with television actress Nicollette Sheridan (of the ABC series Desperate Housewives in character as Edie Britt) in an introductory skit which opened that evening's Monday Night Football telecast, in which Owens and the Eagles played the Cowboys at Texas Stadium. Some observers (especially then-Indianapolis Colts coach Tony Dungy) condemned the skit as being sexually suggestive because of Sheridan removing a towel, and ABC later apologized for airing it. However, on March 14, 2005, the Federal Communications Commission ruled that the skit did not violate decency standards, because it contained no outright nudity or foul language.

=== 2006 Hydrocodone overdose ===
Some media outlets in Dallas reported on the morning of September 27, 2006, that Owens had tried to kill himself by intentionally ingesting an overdose of hydrocodone, a pain medication. A police report filed on the night of September 26 seemed to confirm the attempt, saying that Owens' publicist, Kim Etheredge, found him unresponsive with an empty bottle of pain killers, pried two pills from his mouth, and called 9-1-1, after which an ambulance transported him four blocks from his Deep Ellum condo to Baylor University Medical Center.

According to the police report, Owens and Etheredge both said he was depressed, and Owens answered "yes" when asked whether he had intended to harm himself. Owens' publicist, however, refuted the report, stating that Owens had suffered an allergic reaction to the medication combined with a dietary supplement. ESPN reported that about half the police report was blacked out, but included the phrases "attempting suicide by prescription pain medication" and "a drug overdose".

Owens left the hospital later on September 27. At a news conference after his release, Owens denied having made a suicide attempt, stating that he expected to join the team for practice the next morning. He stated that he was "not depressed" and was "very happy to be here", and denied that doctors had pumped his stomach, calling speculation to that effect "definitely untrue". The press conference took place after Owens had run routes and caught passes with the Cowboys at the team's practice facility in Valley Ranch.

Afterwards, Owens' publicist stated that she felt the police had taken advantage of Owens. The president of the union representing Dallas police officers subsequently demanded an apology from Owens and his publicist for her comments, which he said damaged the reputations of three patrolmen. On Thursday, September 28, the Dallas Police Department reported the incident to be an "accidental overdose" and ended their investigation.

The pain medication Owens had ingested had been prescribed to him for a broken finger he had suffered in a Week 2 victory against the Washington Redskins. Bill Parcells had noted in a press conference a few days before the incident that the medication Owens had been taking had made him sick, and he had been prescribed a milder pain killer.

=== Spitting incident ===
After the December 16, 2006, game against the Atlanta Falcons, Falcons cornerback DeAngelo Hall stated that Owens spat in his face after a play early in the game. Game officials and reporters were unaware of the incident and Owens was not asked about it until his post-game interview with the NFL Network, when he confirmed it. Owens said, "I got frustrated and I apologize for that. It was a situation where he kept hugging me and getting in my face. He had a lot of words, I didn't. I just wanted to come and prove I'm not a guy to be schemed with." Hall said that he lost all respect for Owens. When made aware that Hall was saying Owens did it deliberately, Owens said that it was an accident that occurred while they were in each other's face, talking trash. Despite no video evidence, the NFL fined Owens $35,000 for the incident. After initially refusing to take a phone call from Owens, Hall was convinced by Deion Sanders to speak with Owens two days after the incident and later stated that they "cleared it all out".

=== Hall of Fame ===
Owens was not voted into the Pro Football Hall of Fame in his first two years of eligibility, despite being statistically ranked near the top of every NFL receiving category. Commentators attributed Owens' exclusion to his issues off the field.

In 2018, Owens was voted into the Hall of Fame. He subsequently caused controversy in his induction by skipping the official celebration in Canton, Ohio, and instead choosing to host his own celebration in McKenzie Arena on the campus of the University of Tennessee at Chattanooga, his alma mater. Owens is the only inductee of the hall to skip his induction and instead host a separate induction ceremony.

=== Defamation lawsuit ===
After the polarizing case surrounding the death of Nolan Wells, a grand jury said that Wells death was "consistent with drowning" and declined to recommend charges against anybody. Four days later, Owens went to X and tweeded "ARREST THEM IMMEDIATELY" (referring to the friends of Nolan wells: Warren Hudson, Jax Pitalo, and Morgan Seymour) and attached a link to an Instagram video that insinuated that they were responsible for the death of Nolan. The fathers of the three filed an defamatory lawsuit against Owens. Hudson, Pitalo, and Seymour claimed that "Owens circulated a false narrative about them and accused them of crimes they did not commit".

== Touchdown celebrations ==
During his playing career, Owens attracted attention for his flamboyant celebrations after scoring touchdowns, some of which resulted in fines from the NFL front office.

=== Celebrations for San Francisco ===
- On September 24, 2000, in Dallas, Owens twice sprinted to midfield after scoring touchdowns and stood on the Dallas Cowboys' star logo. The second time, Cowboys safety George Teague leveled him at midfield, which started a confrontation between the two teams. Teague was ejected from the game, while Owens was suspended for a week by head coach Steve Mariucci. This celebration would be mimicked 18 years later by Tennessee Titans safety Kevin Byard, who also ran to the star to celebrate after intercepting Cowboys quarterback Dak Prescott in the end zone. This caused Owens to tweet "I feel like I've seen this before" after the play and celebration occurred.
- During a Monday Night Football game against the Seattle Seahawks on October 14, 2002, Owens pulled a Sharpie marker out of his sock to sign the football he caught to score a touchdown, and then gave the ball to his financial adviser, who also happened to be the financial adviser of Shawn Springs, who was covering Owens on the play. He was criticized by Seahawks head coach Mike Holmgren for the stunt, but was not punished by the 49ers or the NFL. However, in the wake of the highly publicized incident, the league immediately adopted a new rule banning players from carrying "foreign objects" with them on the field.

=== Celebrations for Philadelphia ===
- The "Bird Dance", "The Bird", or "Wing Flap" became T.O.'s trademark dance with the Eagles. T.O. did the "Bird Dance" frequently during the 2004 season after a big play or touchdown. His touchdown celebration was mocked by Hines Ward in the Eagles' first loss of the season at Pittsburgh. After scoring on a reverse, Ward flexed and began flapping his arms like a bird.
- Owens imitated and mocked the trademark pre-game ritual dance of Baltimore Ravens linebacker Ray Lewis after scoring a touchdown while playing against the Ravens in the 2004 season.

=== Celebrations for Dallas ===
- On the Thanksgiving Day game against the Tampa Bay Buccaneers on November 23, 2006, Owens, after catching a pass for a touchdown, dropped the ball in an oversized Salvation Army Red Kettle, donating the ball to the Salvation Army. About the touchdown celebration, Owens was quoted as saying, "That was my donation. I hope it's worth as much as the fine."
- On September 16, 2007, Owens mocked Bill Belichick after catching a touchdown against the Miami Dolphins, by hiding behind a field goal post and holding the football to his face in a video camera fashion, as if secretly spying and filming the game. The Cowboys were penalized 15 yards for "excessive celebration". On September 19, 2007, the league fined Owens $7,500 for the celebration.
- On November 4, 2007, against his former team, the Philadelphia Eagles, Owens flapped his wings, mimicking the dance he did while with the Eagles. This, coupled with Owens' tumultuous stay with the Eagles and his subsequent tenure with the Cowboys (an Eagles division rival), earned the boos of the crowd. After the game, Owens was quoted as saying, "There's a lot of love in those boos."

== Other work ==
Owens is depicted in a photographic work by contemporary African-American artist Hank Willis Thomas entitled Liberation of T.O.: Ain't no way I'm go'n in back ta'work fa'massa in dat darn field (2004). The work was featured in "Frequency", the Studio Museum in Harlem's 2006 exhibition of emerging artists.

Owens wrote the children's book Little T Learns to Share, which was published in November 2006.

Owens rapped in a single titled "I'm Back", available for download on his website.

Outside of his football career, Owens also appeared in various commercials, television shows, and films. Owens played himself, as a wide receiver wearing #82 for the fictional Miami Sharks, in the 1999 film Any Given Sunday. In 2003, he appeared in a commercial for the ESPY Awards where he caught a home run ball from Barry Bonds in McCovey Cove. Owens appeared in an episode of Punk'd, starring Ashton Kutcher, which is based on his November 19, 2005, suspension.

In August 2008, Owens was featured in the pilot episode of the web series FACETIME, on My Damn Channel. He and Three 6 Mafia interview each other in the episode.

He starred in a summer 2009 reality show on VH1, dubbed The T.O. Show; the show followed Owens and his "best friends and publicists" as they re-evaluated Owens' personal life.

Owens appeared in the NBA All-Star celebrity game again in 2009 scoring 17 points including two alley-oops, to secure his second consecutive MVP award.

In June 2009, Owens starred in ABC's reincarnation of Superstars, a sports competition show from the 70s where celebrities are paired with professional athletes. The first episode is rumored to have ended in controversy, as evidenced by a leaked clip of partner supermodel Joanna Krupa calling Owens a "prima donna".

As a one-time rating sweeps week stunt, Owens replaced WKBW-TV sports anchor Jeff Russo for their 6:00 p.m. newscast on May 18, 2009.

On May 8, 2012, Owens appeared on Dr. Phil with the mothers of three of his children to discuss relationships.

In 2013, NBC Sports reported that Owens has become a model.

In 2014, Owens made a cameo appearance in R&B singer Faith Evans' music video "I Deserve It", featuring Missy Elliott and Sharaya J.

In 2015, Owens participated in The Celebrity Apprentice 7, finishing in 12th place.

On September 5, 2017, Owens was announced as one of the celebrities set to compete on season 25 of Dancing with the Stars. He was partnered with professional dancer Cheryl Burke and was the eighth contestant eliminated.

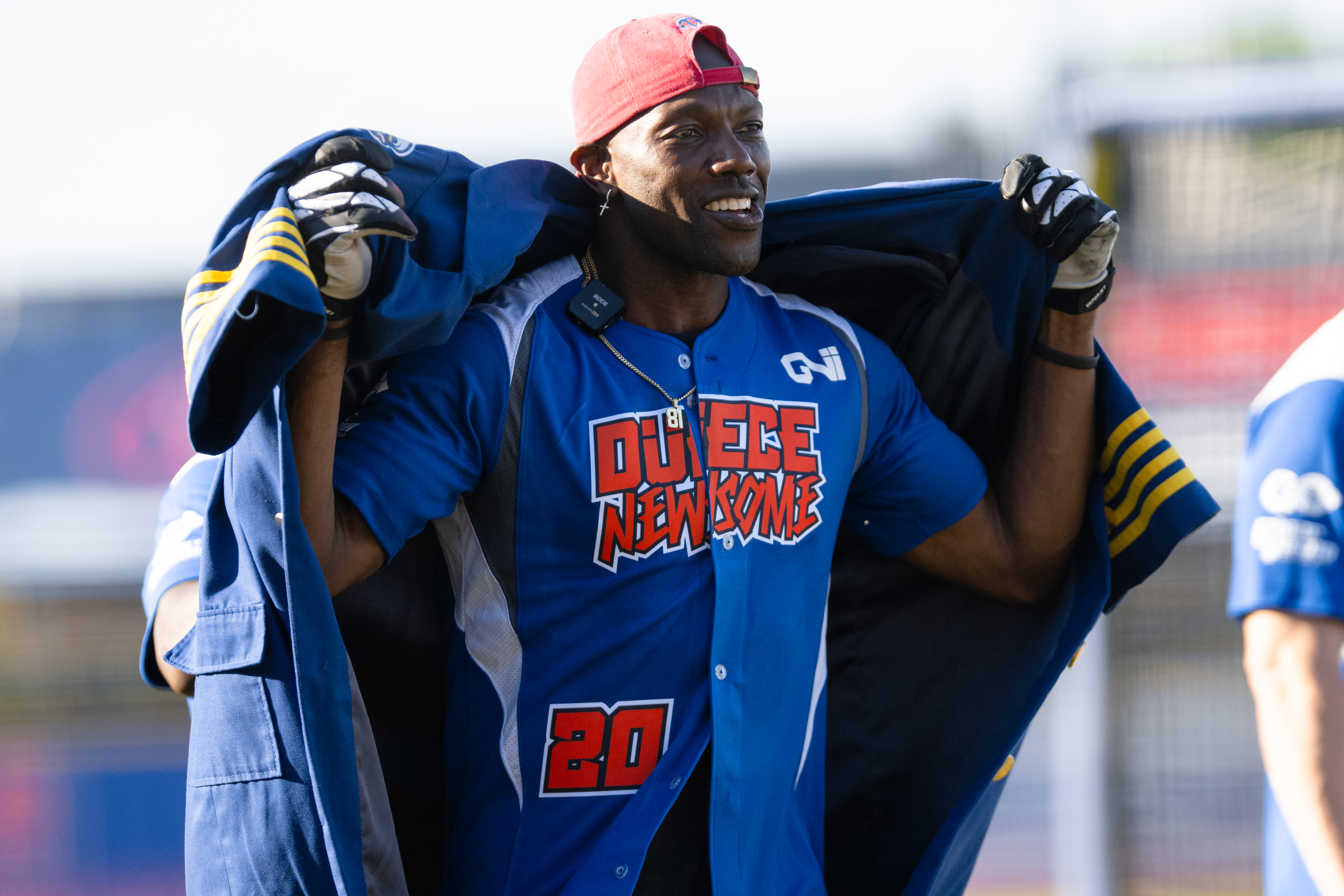
Owens at Greg Newsome's Celebrity Softball Game in 2023

In 2017, Owens competed on the special for the MTV reality series The Challenge titled Champs vs. Stars.

In May 2018, it was announced that Owens would be featured on the cover of the "Hall of Fame" edition of Madden NFL 19.

An avid bowler, Owens has twice won Chris Paul's CP3 PBA Celebrity Invitational, an annual televised event in which celebrities and PBA Tour professionals team up to benefit the Chris Paul Family Foundation. Owens won in 2016 with Pete Weber, and again in 2021 with AJ Johnson. Owens has also won the Celebrity Clash at this event twice, in 2018 and 2021.

=== The T.O. Show ===
In the summer of 2009, VH1 premiered The T.O. Show, which followed Owens in his personal life off the football field. The show was renewed for two additional seasons.

=== Time Out with T.O. ===
In September 2013, Owens launched a podcast on the Sideshow Network with co-hosts comedian Alonzo Bodden and former Survivor contestant and podcast host, Rob Cesternino. Shows are released each Wednesday and the discussion centers on the week's NFL games and news. Comedian Roy Wood Jr. has been a regular guest.

Guests have been from both the sports and the entertainment worlds. Some of them were: Ron Artest, Ray J, comic Sam Tripoli, and writer Caleb Bacon. The podcast ended in April 2014.

== See also ==
- T.O.'s Honey Toasted Oats – Honey Nut Toasted Oats breakfast cereal named after Owens
