= Marxist Tendency =

Marxist Tendency Марксистская тенденция
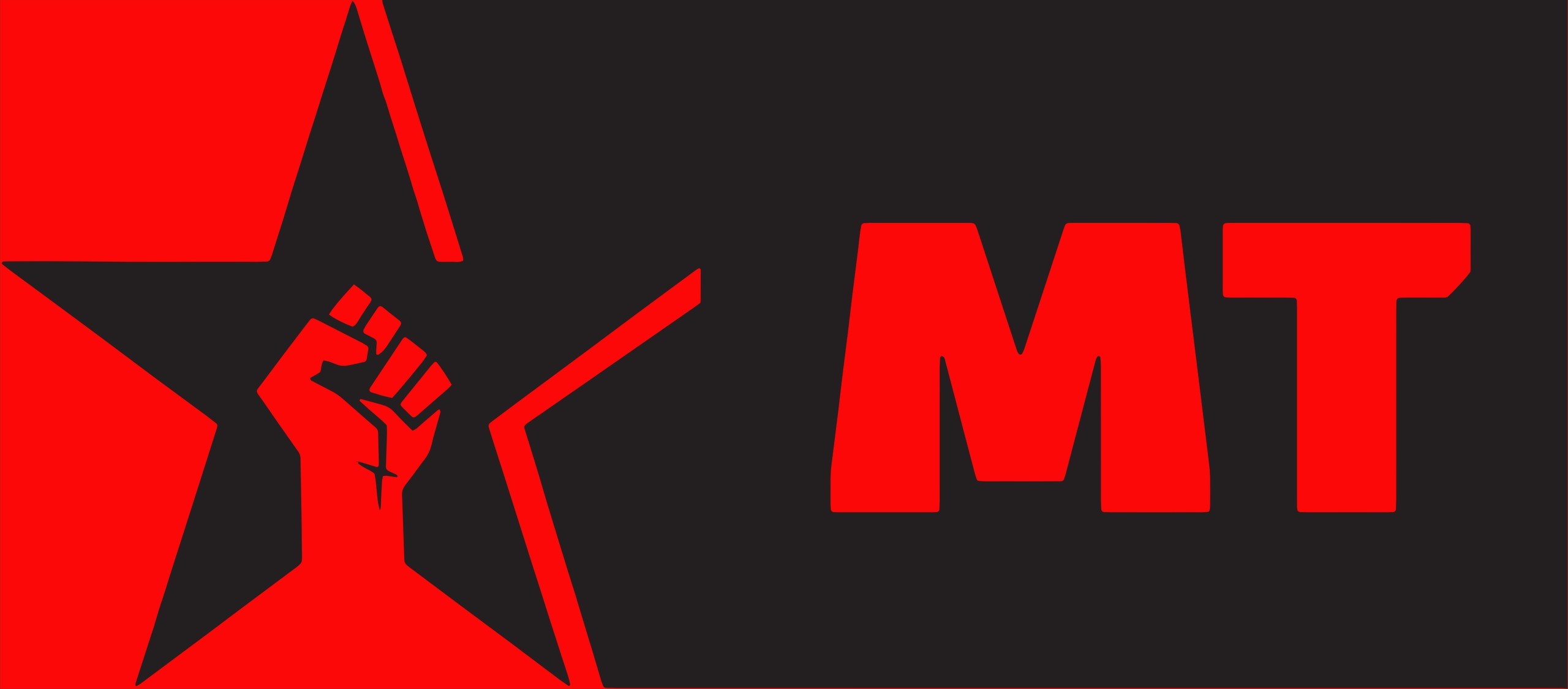
- Abbreviation: MT
- Leader: Collective leadership
- Founded: 3 May 2019; 7 years ago
- Dissolved: 8 May 2023; 3 years ago
- Merger of: Russian section of the IMT; Faction of the RWP
- Merged into: Organisation of Communist Internationalists
- Newspaper: Marxist.news
- Ideology: Marxism; Communism; Trotskyism
- Political position: Far-left
- International affiliation: International Marxist Tendency
- Colours: Red; Black

Party flag
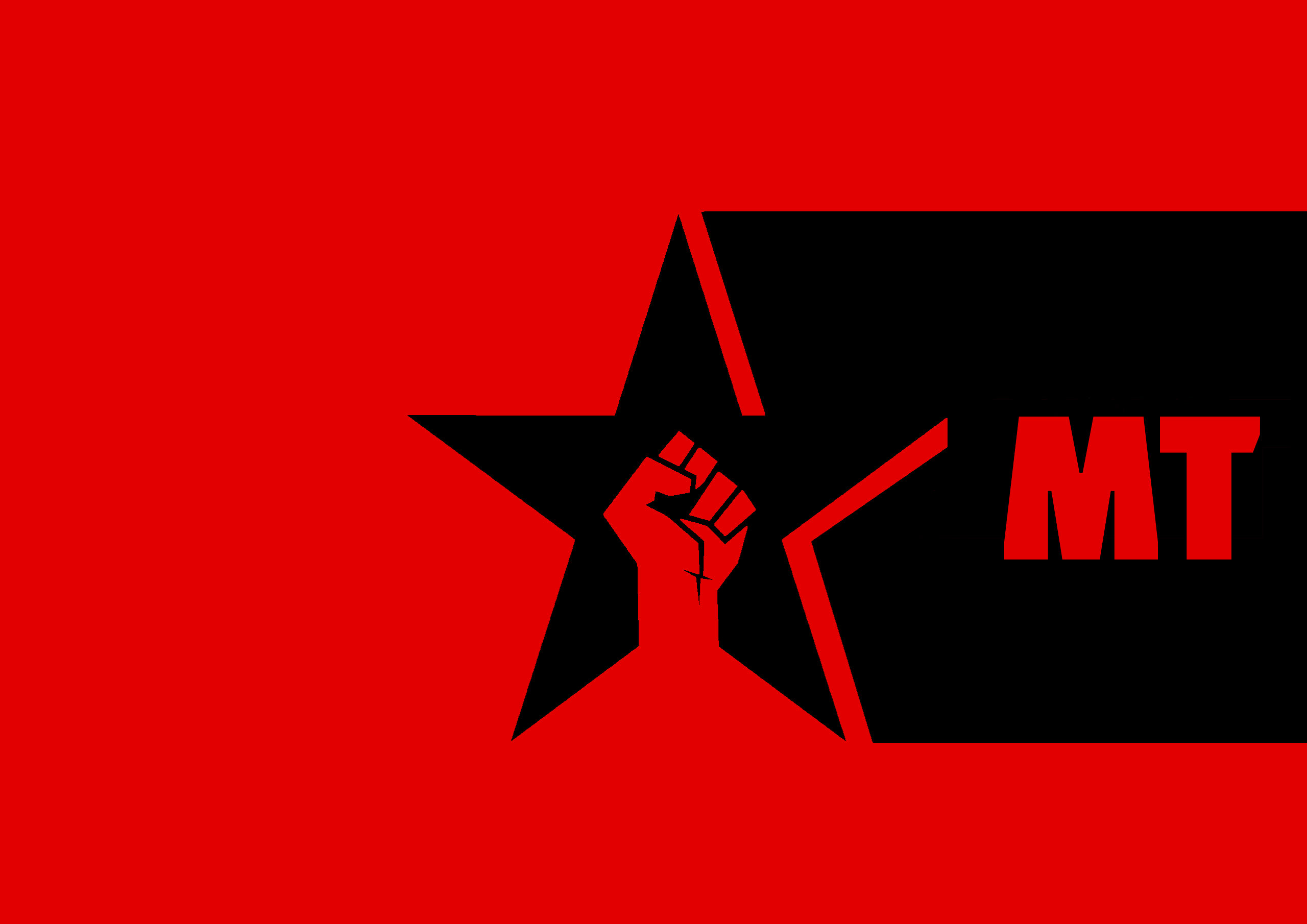

Website
- marxist.news

The Marxist Tendency (Russian: Марксистская тенденция, romanized: Marksistskaya tendentsiya; MT) was a Trotskyist organization in Russia, created in May 2019 as a result of the merger of the Russian section of the International Marxist Tendency with a faction of the Revolutionary Workers' Party. According to its own statements, the MT is a communist organization that is "working to create national sections of the IMT in the territory of the former USSR."

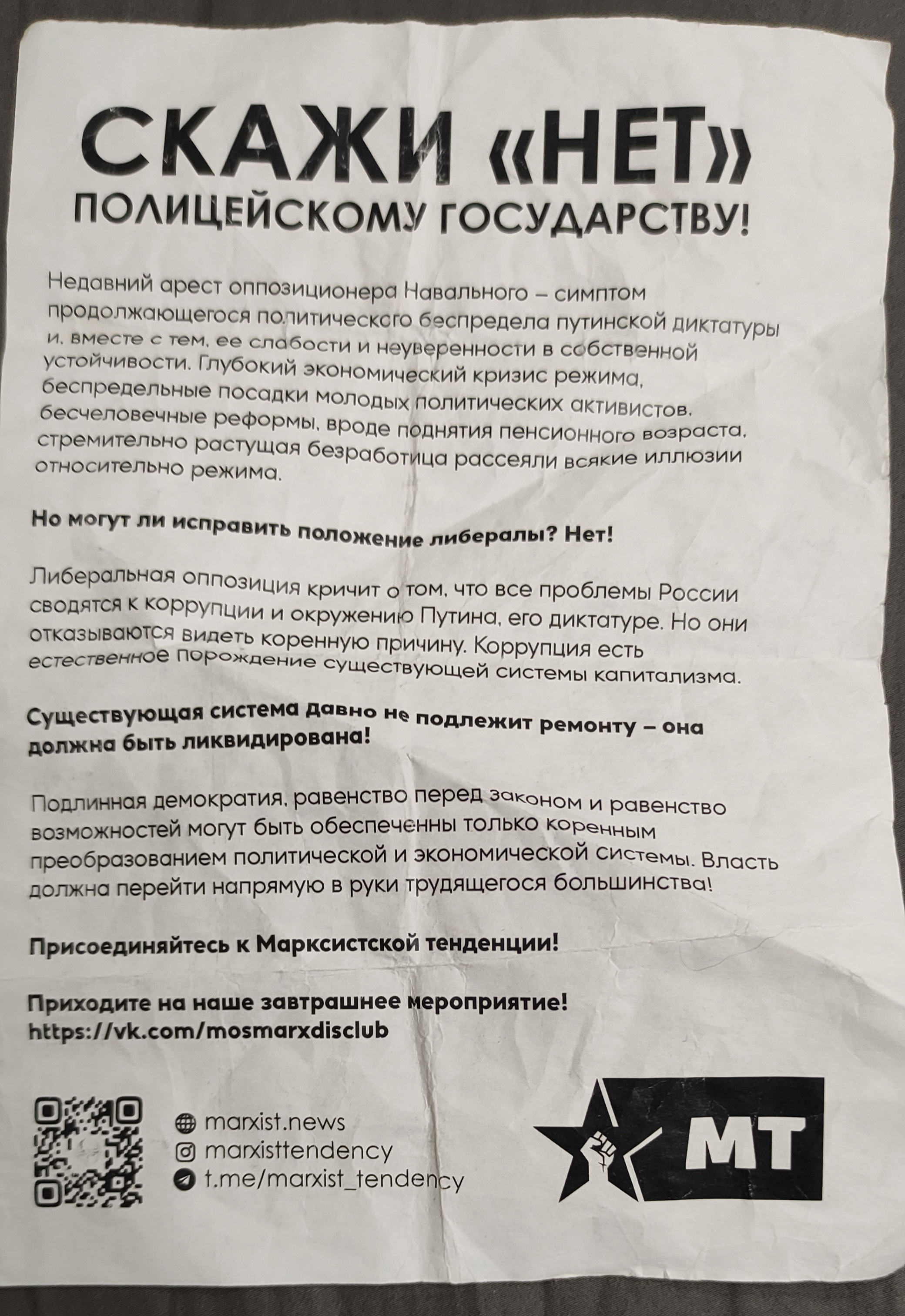
Organization leaflet released for the 2021 protests: Say "No" to the police state!

The movement participated in the 2021 protests and the 2022 anti-war protests, and also condemned the intervention of the CSTO forces in protest-ridden Kazakhstan.

In May 2023, the unification congress of the Marxist Tendency and the communist organisation the New Reds (Russian: Новые красные, romanized: Novyye krasnyye; NK) was held. The new association was called the Organisation of Communist Internationalists (OCI) and became the Russian section of the IMT. After a split in the OCI was founded Workers' Power.
