= Committee for Workers' Democracy and International Socialism =

Committee for Workers' Democracy and International Socialism Комитет за рабочую демократию и международный социализм
- Abbreviation: CWDIS (English); КРДМС (Russian)
- Leader: Sergei Biets
- Founded: 1990
- Dissolved: 7 January 1999
- Succeeded by: Revolutionary Workers' Party; Socialist Resistance
- Headquarters: Moscow, Soviet Union→Russia
- Newspaper: Workers' Democracy
- Ideology: Marxism; Trotskyism
- Political position: Far-left
- International affiliation: Committee for a Workers' International
- Colours: Red; Black
- Slogan: "All power to the workers!" (Russian: "Вся власть рабочим!")
- Anthem: The Internationale

Website
- old.rwp.ru

The Committee for Workers' Democracy and International Socialism (CWDIS or KRDMS; Russian: Комитет за рабочую демократию и международный социализм; КРДМС; Komitet za rabochuyu demokratiyu i mezhdunarodnyy sotsializm, KRDMS) was one of the first Trotskyist organizations in modern Russia.

== Creation of CWDIS ==
Created by Sergei Biets in 1990 as the Russian section of the Committee for a Workers' International (CWI). CWDIS considered itself a direct successor of the Union of Bolshevik-Leninists, founded by Leon Trotsky in 1928. The organization was engaged in the distribution of its propaganda materials and actively participated in the events of 1991 and 1993 in Moscow, opposed the introduction of the "anti-worker" Code of Labor Laws. The committee published the newspaper "Workers' Democracy". In 1993, the organization split over the issue of membership in the CWI. As a result, two groups with the same name were formed.

== CWDIS, section of CWI ==
Was engaged in the publication of the newspaper "Workers' Democracy. In 1998, the organization changed its name to Socialist Resistance and the newspaper to Left Vanguard.

== CWDIS ==
Members of the organization advocated the creation of a "revolutionary workers' party", are not used with any structures. CWDIS began a unifying discussion with the Marxist Workers' Party, in the framework of which several seminars were held on the class nature of the USSR. However, the unification never took place. In 1998, at the Sixth Congress of the CWDIS in Moscow, one of the leaders of the organization, Sergei Biets, proposed to join the Committee for the Marxist International (KMI). His proposal then did not find support.

In January 1999, the Seventh Congress was held, at which the organization decided to join the KMI. At the same congress, the CWDIS was renamed the Revolutionary Workers' Party. At the same congress Boris Stomakhin was expelled from the organization.

== See also ==
- Revolutionary Workers' Party
- Socialist Resistance
