= Socialist League Vpered =

Socialist League «Forward» Социалистическое движение «Вперёд»
- Abbreviation: SDV (English); СДВ (Russian)
- Leader: Central Council
- Founded: September 23, 2005
- Dissolved: March 6, 2011
- Split from: Socialist Resistance
- Merged into: Russian Socialist Movement
- Headquarters: Moscow, Russia
- Newspaper: Vperyod! (Forward!)
- Ideology: Trotskyism; Eco-socialism; Socialist feminism
- Political position: Far-left
- International affiliation: Fourth International
- Colours: Red
- Slogan: "Only forward!" (Russian: "Только вперёд!")

Website
- vpered.org.ru

Socialist League «Vpered» (SDV; Russian: Cоциалистическое движение «Вперёд»; СДВ; Sotsialisticheskoye dvizheniye «Vperyod», SDV) ("Forward") was a radical left-wing political organisation in Russia. It was the Russian section of the reunified Fourth International.

== History and activity ==
It was founded in 2005 as the split from Socialist Resistance, a Russian group then affiliated with the Committee for a Workers' International. In February 2008, it obtained permanent observer status in the Fourth International. In February 2010 it became the Russian section of the Fourth International.

VPERED had groups in a few of the country's cities: Moscow, Nizhny Novgorod, Saint Petersburg, Samara, Saratov, Tyumen, Yaroslavl and others. VPERED was actively involved in campaigns against governmental reform of education. The organisation was active inside some "alternative" trade unions, including the All-Russian Confederation of Labour and Defence of Labour.

VPERED published a paper under the same name. It participated in publishing trade-union magazine Svobodny Profsoyuz (Free Trade-Union) along with the All-Russian Confederation of Labour and left magazine Levaya Politika (Left politics) along with Boris Kagarlitsky and his Institute of Globalization and Social Movements.

== Merger into the RSM ==
In 2011, Socialist League Vpered merged with two other Russian left-wing organizations, Socialist Resistance and the Revolutionary Workers' Party. The new organization was named the Russian Socialist Movement (RSM), with the Russian section of the Fourth International residing in the movement.
