= Workers' Power (Russia) =

Short-lived political organisation in Russia

Workers' Power Рабочая власть
- Founded: 2024
- Dissolved: 22 May 2025
- Split from: OCI
- Ideology: Communism; Trotskyism
- Political position: Far-left

Workers' Power (WP; Russian: Рабочая власть, romanized: Rabochaya vlast') was a Trotskyist organisation that operated in Russia between 2024 and 2025. It ceased to exist after a member of the organisation had been arrested on charges of terrorism apologia.

== Activity ==
Workers' Power was founded in mid-2024 after a split in the Organisation of Communists-Internationalists (OCI; Russian: Организация коммунистов-интернационалистов), the Russian section of the Revolutionary Communist International (RCI). The OCI itself had been founded in May of 2023 as a product of the unification of two organisations: New Reds (NR; Russian: Новые красные) and Marxist Tendency (MT; Russian: Марксисткая тенденция). It was critical of the current Russian government (for instance, disavowing the banning of the "international LGBT movement") and distributed books by the British Trotskyist author Alan Woods. The OCI consisted of a number of cells in various Russian cities, but most members were concentrated in Moscow and Saint Petersburg. During the split, WP severed all ties to the RCI.

WP hosted film screenings, exhibitions, and support events for leftist political prisoners; held public discussions on labour rights, inequality, and ecological concerns; and worked with student associations, independent unions, and urban conservation initiatives. Its manifesto, published in March 2025, analysed the current state of the capitalist world, with a focus on Russia, from a radical Marxist perspective, and called for unification of communist forces and labouring masses for combat against socio-economic issues and future formation of a communist party for mass mobilisation and overthrow of capitalism.

== Persecution ==
In April of 2025 WP became a target of Russian law enforcement agencies after an anonymous and informal association of students of the Saint Petersburg State University (SPSU), calling itself the Administrative Relations Department (ARD; Russian: Управление по работе с администрацией, УРА) took responsibility for an event during which unknown persons hanged a doll depicting the roman goddess Minerva, with an attached note saying "Science is dead", on the monument to Count Uvarov. In the aftermath, the state-owned news agency RIA Novosti quoted a source within law enforcement stating that a "cell of unemployed students from well-off families", that existed as a "part of an international network centered in Britain, led by Trotskyist ideologue Alan Woods", operating "under supervision of experienced far-left radical Trotskyists" had been "discovered" in the SPSU. The unnamed source further alleged that the "increase in activity of pro-british radical agitators in the student community in the region is likely tied to the worsening geopolitical relations between Russia and the United Kingdom, and has the ultimate goal of forming a core of protest activists ready for direct action". In this way, the Minerva event had been tied to WP.

Activists from both the ARD and WP denied WP's involvement in the event, as well as connections to Alan Woods, and accusations of acting in the interests of the UK. A few weeks after the event two students were detained on charges of organising an uncoordinated public event; both were later found guilty. The ARD denied either student being a member, and both students denied having knowledge of either the ARD or WP.

On the 13th of May a member of WP and lead singer of the band Silver Machine received a fine for a satirical song "Zа наших" (English: "For Ours"). The song featured sarcastic calls to fight in a war "for our masters, for their comfort", and "for Gazprom, for Tinkoff" at the call of "genetic code". The court declared that the song's content is directed to incite "hatred and animosity" and "derogation based on sex, race, nationality, language, place of origin, religious beliefs or membership in a social group".

On the 15th of May, dwellings of a number of students in St. Petersburg were raided and searched by law enforcement personnel. Published reports featured photographs of multiple printed copies of WP's manifesto. Reportedly, six persons were detained, and at least one violently beaten. A criminal case was started against Harry Azaryan, a Kazakhstani citizen and student of the SPSU. The state investigators claim that Azaryan, in January and February of 2025, "publicly justified acts of terror, allegedly vocally encouraged mass murder, and formed plans to use students for direct action". The case was started on the basis of an audio recording of an informal meeting, during which Azaryan spoke of revolution, class hatred, and "strength of the street". Azaryan himself rejected the accusations. In September of 2025 he was subjected to a forensic psychiatric examination on demand of the investigators.

On the 22nd of May WP declared its self-dissolution, citing "rising police pressure" and suspected risk of mass arrests and further persecution as reasons for the decision.
