= The T.O. Show =

American reality television series

- Genre: Reality
- Starring: Terrell Owens
- Country of origin: United States
- Original language: English
- No. of seasons: 3
- No. of episodes: 27

Production
- Executive producers: Jeff Olde; Jill Holmes; Jesse Ignjatovic; Noah Pollack; Evan Prager
- Running time: 30 minutes
- Production company: Den of Thieves

Original release
- Network: VH1
- Release: July 20, 2009 – October 31, 2011

The T.O. Show is an American reality television series that premiered on VH1 on July 20, 2009. It follows Owens and his friend (Monique Jackson) and publicist (Kita Williams) as they re-evaluate Owens' personal life, while battling the two sides of his personality and also trying to find romance for him.

On September 9, 2009, VH1 announced that the series has been picked up for a second season. Season Two premiered on VH1 on July 11, 2010.

On February 28, 2011, VH1 announced that the series has been picked up for a third season. The series relocated to Miami. The third season premiered on August 22, 2011.

== Cast ==
=== Main cast ===
- Terrell Owens is a free agent wide receiver in the National Football League. He is a six-time Pro-Bowl selection.
- Kita Williams, one of Terrell's best friends to help him match his NFL achievements with similar success off the field. The public relations company she founded with partner Monique Jackson, Kita functions as matchmaker, therapist, and best friend while managing the Terrell Owens Brand. Kita is single and is a member of the National Association of Black Female Executives in Music and Entertainment. She is a graduate of the University of Kentucky and also holds an MBA from the University of Phoenix.
- Monique Jackson, one of Terrell's best friends. Jackson founded a public relations company with her business partner Kita Williams. Servicing superstar client Terrell Owens, Jackson and Williams manage all aspects of the Owens brand, including marketing, promotions, and public relations. She's Known as "Momma Mo" for her ability to nurture and encourage clients to be their best, Mo attributes her career vector to her childhood dreams of becoming "a minister, a nurse and an entertainer."

=== Supporting cast ===
- Kari Klinkenborg, (season 1–present)
- Felisha Terrell, is Terrell's ex-fiancée. (season 1–present)
- Pablo Cosby, is Terrell's former body guard. (season 1)

=== Guest appearances ===
- Andy Roddick, a professional tennis player.
- Chad Ochocinco, an American football wide receiver who is currently a free agent.
- Donovan McNabb, a former American football quarterback.
- Jessica White, a model and occasional actress.
- Matthew Hatchette, an American football player.
- Tatyana Ali, a singer and actress.

== Episodes ==
=== Season 1 (2009) ===
No.	Title	Original release date	Prod. code	US viewers (millions)
1	"Introducing"	July 20, 2009	101	1.2
Debut: Terrell Owens's publicists, Mo and Kita try to convince him and Pablo to move to LA, now that Owens has been cut from the Dallas Cowboys.
2	"Key to the City"	July 27, 2009	102	N/A
Owens travels to Buffalo now that he has been signed to the Bills, being presented a key to the city by the mayor. Mo has found her "long lost half sister".
3	"T.O's Emotional Trip Home"	August 3, 2009	103	1.836
Inspired by Mo, Owens says that "now's the time for him to have a sit-down with his estranged father". He, Pablo, and Mo travel to Alexander City, Alabama, which is Owens's hometown, to visit his old high school and his family.
4	"Momma Mo"	August 10, 2009	104	N/A
Owens and Pablo play basketball with former professional football player Matthew Hatchette. He must prepare for the ESPY awards and a taping at Comedy Central for the internet video-clip show Tosh.0. Kita announces that she has a date, and is taking the night off. Owens takes his date Kari to the Awards, but the next day, Kari broke up with him because of lack of communication between the two.
5	"It's Party Time"	August 17, 2009	105	1.415
Mo is under stress as a result of her planned vow renewal ceremony. In response, Owens offers to pay for the ceremony, which makes Mo happy. Meanwhile, Kita is upset since she thinks "everyone has forgotten her birthday", but what she doesn't know is that Owens is only pretending to have forgotten. Now that Owens and Kari are no longer together, he is dating Victoria's Secret model Jessica White. Owens feels that he must apologize to Kari about the breakup that happened.
6	"What Happens in Vegas"	August 24, 2009	106	1.579
As the date of Mo's vow renewal ceremony approaches, Kita plans to throw her a bachelorette party in Vegas. Not to be outdone, Terrell and the guys host a bachelor party for Vic, Mo's husband. But both guys and girls were throwing their parties at the same hotel. Later, things get heated when Mo hired a male stripper at the girls' hotel room and Owens was astonished at their bill. During dinner, both Mo and Kita argued about hiring the male stripper, with Mo saying Kita is no longer allowed to go to Mo's wedding.
7	"The Ceremony"	August 31, 2009	107	1.687
It's the weekend of Mo's wedding and neither Kita nor Terrell is anywhere to be found. While Mo is busy stressing over the wedding details, Terrell and Pablo spend the day relaxing before finally showing up to the rehearsal dinner. After kicking her out of the bridal party, Mo reaches out to Kita to try to make peace, but can't reach her. Terrell calls Kita and pleads with her to come to the ceremony. Kita arrives at the hotel, but no one is sure if she'll show up for the ceremony. Terrell and Kari attend the wedding as a couple, but with Terrell off to Buffalo soon for the start of the season, whether they stay together is anybody's guess!

=== Season 2 (2010) ===
No.	Title	Original release date	Prod. code	US viewers (millions)
8	"Bye Bye Buffalo"	July 11, 2010	201	1.632
Terrell's back in Los Angeles after a disappointing season in Buffalo has him questioning his future in football. While Mo and Kita hunt for a house for Terrell, he moves in with Mo -- which puts his babysitting skills to the ultimate test.With his professional career in transition, Terrell also tries to address his personal relationships with his on again off again girlfriend Kari.
9	"Family Ties"	July 18, 2010	202	0.860
As Terrell settles into his new Los Angeles digs, his faltering relationship with Kari drives him into therapy. Mo and Kita are also working to build relationships and they invite Terrell's ex fiancée Felisha out to lunch. In another first, Terrell hosts a princess party for two of his daughters, who've never met before.
10	"Empire State of T.O."	July 25, 2010	203	N/A
Terrell and Kita head to New York where Terrell tries his hand at modeling during New York Fashion Week. Terrell makes an unforgettable debut walking the runway at a fashion show and takes over the city while Kita gets pushed to the sidelines. But Terrell has one last surprise up his sleeve for Kita before they return to LA.
11	"Man's Best Friends"	August 1, 2010	204	0.958
With Monique "Mo" Jackson weeks away from giving birth, an awkward Terrell Owens fills in for her husband Vic at birthing class. And Terrell's desire for canine companionship gets put to the test when he dog sits for a friend.
12	"Sex and Secrets"	August 8, 2010	205	0.803
When Terrell Owens guest stars on a television talk show about sex, his girlfriend Kari hears more than she can handle. This time their relationship could be reaching its ultimate breaking point. Meanwhile, Kita's boyfriend, Joe, reveals a secret that shatters their blossoming relationship.
13	"Old Habits"	August 8, 2010	206	0.852
Tensions rise when Terrell is invited to a special Pros vs. Joes basketball competition and is reunited with his old Philadelphia Eagles teammate, Donovan McNabb. Meanwhile, in an effort to get Terrell organized Mo and Kita set out to hire Terrell an assistant. But this new face is not at all what he had in mind.
14	"Love Game"	August 15, 2010	207	0.805
Terrell Owens gives Kita a lesson in tennis etiquette when they travel to Miami to see Andy Roddick play in a tournament. After the match, Terrell, Kita, and her sister BJ let loose on South Beach, and Kita goes wild. Back at home in LA, a surprise visit from Joe at Mo's baby shower has Kita reconsidering their relationship.
15	"Kentucky Kita"	August 22, 2010	208	0.916
Terrell Owens accompanies Kita Williams back to her hometown of Louisville, where he meets her family, and attends the Kentucky Derby. After getting caught up in the excitement of horse racing they visit a stud farm to consider buying a horse. When Kita returns to L.A., she and Mo come to blows over their business and relationships.
16	"Taking Chances"	August 29, 2010	209	0.774
Terrell Owens moves closer to his dream of becoming a serious actor when he lands an audition for his first leading role in a film. Everything is put on hold when Mo goes into labor and she is rushed to the hospital. When everyone gathers at the hospital, Terrell runs into a familiar face...his ex fiance, Felisha.
17	"Hail Mary"	September 5, 2010	210	1.105
In the season finale, Terrell visits Mo's new born baby, Jackson, for the first time. Mo challenges Terrell about his role as a father which pushes their friendship to the breaking point. As the off season comes to a close Terrell is set to make his next move professionally, but looking back at his time in Los Angeles leads Terrell to a big decision -- a marriage proposal! Will it be Kari or Felisha?

=== Season 3 (2011) ===
No.	Title	Original release date	Prod. code	US viewers (millions)
18	"Under the Knife"	August 22, 2011	301	1.508
T.O. faces ACL surgery in the third-season opener, and Kita rushes to be with him and lend support.
19	"Road to Recovery"	August 29, 2011	302	1.323
T.O. plans to come back from ACL surgery and try to play football this season.
20	"Move to Miami"	September 5, 2011	303	1.269
Terrell and Kita move to Miami once Terrell is back on his feet after surgery. Then, Monique shows up there, too, and the team dynamic is threatened.
21	"Bad Influences, Good Ideas"	September 12, 2011	304	1.028
Ex-NBA champ John Salley advises T.O. on life after retirement and takes Terrell, Kita and Monique out on the town.
22	"T.O. Cutz and Curlz"	September 19, 2011	305	N/A
23	"Back to 'Bama"	September 26, 2011	306	N/A
24	"Star 81"	October 10, 2011	307	N/A
25	"The Next Stage"	October 17, 2011	308	N/A
26	"Fantastic Voyage"	October 24, 2011	309	N/A
27	"Next Steps"	October 31, 2011	3010	N/A
