= A Just World (Russia) =

A Just World Справедливый мир
- Leader: Collective leadership
- Founded: February 28, 2024; 2 years ago
- Ideology: Anti-war; Anti-Putinism; Factions: Democratic socialism Communism; Feminism; Anti-capitalism; Social democracy Trotskyism
- Political position: Centre-left to far-left
- Colours: Red

Website
- spravedlivost2024.org

A Just World (Russian: Справедливый мир, romanized: Spravedlivyy mir, lit. 'A Just Peace/A Just World' (Note: The Russian word мир can mean either “world" or “peace.")) is a left-wing opposition political coalition in Russia established in 2024.

== History ==
A Just World coalition was established in anticipation of the 2024 Russian presidential election. The coalition included people and organizations holding anti-war, democratic, socialist and communist views. One of the co-founders of the coalition, left-wing blogger and founder of the Union of Marxists Andrey Rudoy, believes that “the coalition should have appeared two years ago, but the elections became a kind of catalyst that somewhat accelerated all processes. A left-wing non-systemic anti-war camp has already taken shape with a more or less common understanding of the transition program and tactics."

The coalition called for people to come to the polls on the last day, March 17, at 12:00 and spoil their ballot. A Just World coalition believes that the “Noon Against Putin” action could become a starting point for uniting the left and for consolidating anti-war and democratic-minded citizens around them.

== Ideology ==
According to the coalition, despite different opinions, it is ready to “tactically cooperate” with the liberal opposition.

The coalition advocates for the right of nations to self-determination, and for fair referendums on the status of Crimea and the annexed regions of Ukraine, after their demilitarization.

== Members ==
=== Organizations ===
- Socialists Against War Coalition
- Russian Socialist Movement
- Socialist Tendency

=== Journals/blogs ===
- Vestnik Buri
- Allo, Macron
- Nevoyna
- Black Book of Capitalism
- New Deal
- Sentyabr

=== People ===
- Yevgeny Stupin
- Mariya Menshikova (RSD member)
- Mikhail Lobanov
- Vitaly Bovar (Yabloko member)
- Sergey Tsukasov
- Pavel Kudyukin (Democracy and Socialism group member)
- Elmar Rustamov (Labour Russia member)
- Sasha Talaver (FAS and RSD member)
