= Russian Socialist Movement =

Russian Socialist Movement Российское социалистическое движение
- Abbreviation: RSM (English); RSD (Russian)
- Leader: Collective leadership
- Founded: 7 March 2011
- Dissolved: 8 May 2024
- Merger of: SDV; SocSopr; FSM; DSPA
- Headquarters: Moscow
- Newspaper: Socialist
- Ideology: Democratic socialism Trotskyism; Anti-fascism; Socialist feminism Anti-capitalism; Anti-Putinism
- Political position: Left-wing to far-left
- National affiliation: A Just World
- International affiliation: Fourth International
- Colours: Red

Party flag

Website
- anticapitalist.ru

Russian Socialist Movement (RSD; Russian: Российское социалистическое движение, romanized: Rossiyskoye sotsialisticheskoye dvizheniye) was a left-wing to far left political organisation in Russia. It was created in 2011 by the merging of various left-wing, socialist, anti-capitalist and communist organisations. It is strongly critical of President Vladimir Putin.

On 5 April 2024, the RSD was recognized as a foreign agent by the Ministry of Justice, and in connection with this, on 8 May 2024, it announced the termination of its activities and self-dissolution.

== Foundation ==
The Russian Socialist Movement was officially founded on 7 March 2011 as a merger of the Socialist League "Vpered" (Forward, Russian section of the Fourth International) and Socialist Resistance. The move had been agreed upon by the sixth congress of Vpered and the separate Socialist Resistance conference, held a day earlier on March 6. Shortly afterwards, in April 2011, the Perm branch of the Revolutionary Workers' Party also joined. A group of members of the Fourth International was formed within the RSM, which has become the new Russian section of the Fourth International.

The founding conference supported the draft "road map" for the integration of the left and its focus on building a broad anti-capitalist left party, together with representatives of other Russian left-wing organizations and social movements. The founding conference of the RSM was attended by representatives of the Institute of Globalisation and Social Movements, the Federation of Socialist Youth from St. Petersburg, the Peter Alekseev Resistance Movement, and the French New Anti-Capitalist Party. There was support for the inclusion of the Central Council representative of the Left Front in an advisory capacity. In turn, the Left Front will include in its executive committee one representative from the unified organization with an advisory vote. This kind of exchange of ambassadors in the governing bodies of two of the key actors of the Russian left is intended to demonstrate a broad alliance, and the seriousness of the left's intentions of unification.

== Ideological principles ==
The main policy documents of the organisation are the manifesto of the Russian Socialist Movement, entitled 'Revolution – Democracy – Socialism', and a political statement entitled 'Towards the construction of an organisation of the anti-capitalist left'. These documents contain an analysis of the Russian political and economic systems and a left-wing alternative for the development of these systems. According to the manifesto, the RSM defines itself as an anti-fascist, revolutionary, democratic, socialist organisation.

As stated in the Manifesto, one of the key objectives of the RSM is "all-round support to all forms of workers' struggle and self-organisation, primarily through militant trade unions. Defending the interests of the labour movement as a whole, the RSM will develop and strengthen independent and grass-roots trade union movements, focusing itself on a decisive struggle for democratic and anti-capitalist demands."

== Activities ==
After the unification of left-wing organisations, the RSM included more than ten regional branches with centres in Moscow, Saint Petersburg, Kaluga, Novosibirsk, Perm, Saratov, Yaroslavl and other cities. The organisation is actively involved in various social movements, in particular trades unions and urban, environmental and women's movements. Of particular note is the participation of RSM activists in a campaign against the limitation of women's right to abortion, during which actions were staged in many Russian cities.

Members of the organisation were prominent in protests against deforestation in the Khimki and Siverskiy forests, which were to have a new highway built that would run through them. The RSM and other leftist and anarchist organisations gave the demonstrations an explicitly left-wing character and opposed the participation of liberal and right-wing politicians in the campaign. The RSM also acted as one of the organisers of a training camp for protesters, which was attended by anarchists and representatives of other leftist organisations.

The RSM publishes the newspaper Socialist.

== Allied organizations ==
- Federation of Socialist Youth
- Institute "Collective Action"
- Left Front
- Pyotr Alexeyev Resistance Movement
- Russian Social Democratic Union of Youth
- What to do?

== See also ==
- Isabel Magkoeva
- Kirill Medvedev
