= Isabel Magkoeva =

Russian political activist

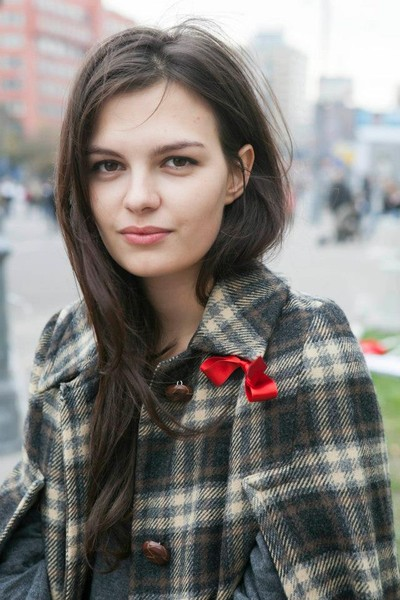
Isabel Magkoeva in 2012

Isabel Magkoeva (Russian: Изабель Казбековна Магкоева, born 20 January 1991) is a Russian political activist. She is an alumna of Russian State University for the Humanities in 2010, a specialist in oriental studies and Japanese literature, and a prominent member of the Russian Socialist Movement.

== Activism ==
A former teenage model, Magkoeva became interested in left wing literature when she was in her late teens, and started participating in political events during the 2011–2012 Russian protests (including #OccupyAbay). She was one of the lead speakers on the third "March of Millions" rally in Moscow, one of the organizers of "School of Civic Journalism", a fundraiser for the "6th of May Committee" (an organization in support of Russian political prisoners and detainees), and a participant of several actions in support of aforementioned prisoners. She also participated in numerous debates, some of which were aired on Rain TV. During the Opposition Coordination Council elections, she ran as a candidate from the "New Left" block.

Some journalists and political activists have compared her to the well-known Chilean activist Camila Vallejo.

== Political views ==
In an interview with "Moi Raion" (My District) newspaper, she described her views as "socialist", but rejected the Stalinist ideology of the Russian "old left" as unacceptable for her. She views any government/state as an apparatus of monopolized violence and institutionalized inequality, and expresses positive opinions towards such anarcho-communist ideas as decentralization, direct democracy and collective ownership of natural resources, but doesn't call for an immediate abolition of all government institutions, because it would make no sense so long as the root causes of exploitation and organized violence are still present. She also considers herself a feminist, but admits that in the highly patriarchal Russian society such views are quite unpopular: "I'm all for gender equality and therefore a feminist, but... the root cause of patriarchy is employment inequality, and that's what should be uprooted in the first place. Statistically, women in Russia earn 40% less on average than men, every third woman is subject to domestic violence, and so on". According to her, she chose to join the RSD (Russian Socialist Movement) because of its democratic, non-authoritarian operational structure and opposition to strong leaderism (which distinguishes the RSD from the majority of "old" Russian left-wing movements).
