= T.O.'s Honey Toasted Oats =

limited edition box

T.O.’s Honey Toasted Oats or "T.O.'s" is the name of a brand of Honey Nut Toasted Oats breakfast cereal named after wide receiver Terrell Owens.

Terrell Owens T.O.'s Cereal was officially unveiled on July 30, 2009 nearly four months after he signed a one-year contract with the Buffalo Bills.

The cereal was offered at $2.50 per 14oz box and was a big hit, selling out within hours of initial release. The cereal was made available exclusively at the Tops Markets LLC grocery store chain in upstate New York, and online thru PLB Sports, a Pittsburgh-based product development food brokerage company, also responsible for Flutie Flakes.
