= Little T Learns to Share =

2006 picture book by Terrell Owens

- Authors: Terrell Owens; Courtney Parker
- Cover artist: Todd Harris
- Genre: Picture book
- Publisher: BenBella Books
- Publication date: 2006
- Publication place: United States
- Pages: 24
- ISBN: 1-933771-20-8
- OCLC: 74458823
- Dewey Decimal: [E] 22
- LC Class: PZ8.3.O977 Li 2006

Little T Learns to Share is a children's book written by NFL wide receiver Terrell Owens with Courtney Parker, and illustrated by Todd Harris. Released November 2006, it tells the story of a child named Little T who doesn't want to share his football, but ends up learning about the value of friends.

== Background ==
The book was published by BenBella Books in mid-November 2006. It was announced that Little T Learns to Share will be one of many short kid stories regarding themes such as sharing and making friends. The other two books planned the series were given the working titles Little T Learns What Not To Say and Little T Learns To Say I'm Sorry. When former New York Giants running back Tiki Barber heard that Owens was writing the book, he responded, "He may be drawing on someone else's experiences." Marina Hyde wrote in The Guardian, "I have not yet settled down to lose myself in Little T Learns to Share, but the fact that its author is the Dallas Cowboys wide receiver Terrell Owens would appear to mark it out as some kind of literary hoax, ... if Terrell can publish a child's manual on sharing, there is food for thought here for our finest literary agents, and you wouldn't give it very long before a slew of copycat volumes hits the shelves like Ben Thatcher's elbow on a grateful face"

The book is directed towards children between the ages of three and five. BenBella Books invested $20,000 into marketing the book, which it made an initial printing of 10,000 books for. After the first run sold out, the publisher began a second printing. One year after the book was released, Owens in November 2007 read it to students in the third and fourth grades at Woodland Springs Elementary in Keller, Texas.

== Plot ==
Little T is gifted a football which accompanies him everywhere. His friends, Tim and Sam, want to play with the ball, and Little T declines to share it with them because he worries they will misplace it or get it dirty. After returning to his house, he plays by himself but discovers that needing to toss and grab a football by himself is not enjoyable. Little T shares his worries with his mom. Taking off her rubber gloves, she comforts Little T, advising him to "apologize to both of them for failing to be fair and let them know that they were right: As friends you should always share."

== Reception ==
Stan Hochman wrote in the Philadelphia Daily News, "The plot is simpler than a quarterback sneak, you should excuse the expression." After observing his daughter's kindergarten class's being read the book, Hochman concluded, "The kids liked the book, awkward rhymes and all." Black Issues Book Review's Jacqueline Leslie praised the book, writing, "The authors relate a simple lesson about sharing and friendship in this rhyming book, with vibrant and fun pictures."

In a negative and sarcastic review, The Scranton Times-Tribune's Mike Ashworth wrote, "This modern classic is called Little T Learns to Share. ... After reading, 'I don't think so, Sam—I'm sorry, Tim—I'mma have to turn ya'll down', it is clear that a great pedagogical mind and literary genius was at work here. If you are curious, the writing doesn't get much better, and even the illustrations are mediocre at best. There's more good news, too. The cover sports a bright red star advertising 'First in the T.O.'s Timeouts Series'."
