= Federation of Socialist Youth =

Federation of Socialist Youth Федерация социалистической молодёжи
- Abbreviation: FSM (English); ФСМ (Russian)
- Leader: Kirill Vasiliev; Vladimir Plotnikov
- Founded: End of 1989
- Dissolved: 10 September 2013
- Split from: Socialist platform of the Komsomol
- Preceded by: Surgut Alternative
- Succeeded by: Russian Socialist Movement
- Headquarters: Saint Petersburg, Russia
- Ideology: Socialism; Factions: Democratic socialism Social democracy Communism; Trotskyism
- Political position: Left-wing; Factions: Centre-left to far-left
- National affiliation: Socialist Party (initially)
- Colours: Red; Pink
- Slogan: "Justice is modern!" (Russian: "Справедливость современна!")

Website
- socialist-spb.ru

The Federation of Socialist Youth (FSM; Russian: Федерация социалистической молодёжи; ФСМ; Federatsiya sotsialisticheskoy molodyozhi, FSM) was a socio-political regional organization of St. Petersburg, which brought together young supporters of left-wing ideas in a wide range from communism to social democracy. In December 2003, the legal entity was liquidated and the federation operated without registration. On September 10, 2013, the last entry was published on the FSM official website www.socialist-spb.ru, and the site was closed.

== History ==
The foundation of the FSM was laid in 1989, when a number of left-democratic tendencies in the Komsomol (in particular, the "Surgut Alternative") came up with a proposal to establish the Federation of Socialist Youth of the USSR.

In the spring of 1990, sections of the FSM were created in Leningrad, Moscow, Moscow Oblast, Irkutsk, Tver, Chelyabinsk. At this stage, the FSM acted as a junior partner of the Socialist Party of the Soviet Union, and it was dominated by people with anti-Stalinist, eurocommunist and anarchist convictions. A clear organizational formulation of the FSM at the all-Union and all-Russian level did not happen.

After 1991, the work of the FSM was virtually frozen, and its regional sections fell into decay. The recovery period began in 1994, when the St. Petersburg branches of the Russian Party of Communists (RPC), the Social Democratic Party (SDPR), the Socialist Workers Party (SPT), the Party of Workers' Self-Government (PST), the Social Democratic Union came up with an initiative to revive the activities FSM at the city level. A conference is being held by the "Federation of Socialist Youth of St. Petersburg", which adopts the charter and elects the governing and control bodies of the organization.

In 1994-1996. St. Petersburg FSM is constituted as a coalition of youth left and left patriotic structures. It includes representatives of democratic socialists, the Russian Party of Communists (RPC), the youth organization of the CPRF, the youth organization of the Russian All-People's Union (ROS), as well as the Trade Union of street musicians, artists and actors. Later, the "Young Social Democrats" entity was formed within the FSM.

In the 90s, the activities of the FSM were mainly of an educational nature. Historical and political clubs, scientific and practical conferences, round tables, training seminars were organized. The FSM has developed close relationships with such organizations as Russian Scientists of Socialist Orientation, Scientists for Democracy and Socialism, and Spiritual Heritage. The Federation became a member of the Round Table of Youth and Children's Organizations of St. Petersburg, which cooperated with the city administration. This testified to the moderate opposition to the current authorities.

Since the early 2000s, the tactics of the FSM have changed markedly. The organization becomes a noticeable subject of urban public policy. With the direct participation of its activists, bright protest actions are held against the imperialist policy of the United States (military operations in Yugoslavia, Afghanistan and Iraq) and anti-social initiatives of the Russian authorities (adoption of a new Labor Code, reform of housing and communal services). The FSM is part of the citywide protest coalition - the Committee for Unified Actions in Defense of the Social and Labor Rights of Workers in St. Petersburg and the Leningrad Oblast. In 2003, the Federation becomes one of the organizers of the first St. Petersburg march of the left youth "Antikapitalizm".

By the mid-2000s, the FSM consisted of three large entities: Young Supporters of the CPRF, Socialist Alternative and Social-Democratic Union of Youth. In 2007, the FSM rejected the course of cooperation with the liberal opposition in the framework of the so-called Dissenters' Marches. This was one of the reasons for the withdrawal from the Federation of the subject "Social Democratic Union of Youth".

In May 2011, the ideological platform "Revolutionary Communists Bolsheviks" broke away from the FSM, which united a third of the Federation. More than half of the members of the platform were also members of the Communist Party.

== Ideology ==
The FSM does not create any independent ideology, but combines slogans and ideas generally recognized in the ranks of the left into a combination with which all participants would certainly agree. Some activists describe the FSM as an organization of democratic or "non-authoritarian" socialists and communists, while other activists, on the contrary, describe the FSM as an undemocratic and "authoritarian" organization. The FSM charter declares the organization's openness to all who share traditional leftist values and categorically rejects the ideas of "totalitarianism, bourgeois liberalism, national, religious and racial superiority or discrimination."

Among the fundamental goals of the FSM are the following:

- change of the state system towards a democratic republic with the maximum development of local and industrial self-government;
- nationalization of leading banks, land and major sectors of the economy;
- revision of the results of privatization;
- preservation of such social and political guarantees as the right to work, free education and health care; freedom of speech, conscience, assembly and trade union activity; national, racial and gender equality;
- preservation of Petersburg-Leningrad as a center of industry, science and culture.

== Organizational structure ==
The basis of the FSM is platforms that unite at least 5 activists of the Federation and are created on an ideological and political basis. Currently, the FSM has two platforms: Democratic Socialism and Russian Socialist Movement.

The supreme body of the FSM is the General Meeting (conference), convened at least once a year. The meeting forms the management board and the Control and Auditing Commission (CCC). The platforms send to the management board one of their voting members.

The FSM charter is fairly democratic. It allows activists to refrain from participating even in those activities that are approved by the Board. At the same time, the FSM has a strict procedure for admitting new members, which involves the passage of newcomers to the candidate's experience. The decision to expel from the organization is made by the board at its own discretion or by personal application.

== Activities ==
FSM was a notable subject of youth policy in St. Petersburg. The organization's activists took part in protest rallies on various topics, from infringement of workers' rights to actions of solidarity with foreign leftists. In a number of cases, the activities of the FSM received wide informational resonance.

Under the Federation, there was a historical and political club, where topical issues of the protest movement, as well as relevant historical events for the left, were discussed. FSM cooperated with the Center for Mutual Assistance of Workers and the Movement of Civil Initiatives, which unites a number of free trade unions and social protest groups in St. Petersburg and the Leningrad region.

The FSM has established contacts with some foreign structures: the Rosa Luxemburg Foundation, the Left Party of Germany, the Left Alliance of Finland. At the Russian and city level, the FSM partners are the Communist Party of the Russian Federation and the Russian Party of Communists; youth organizations RCYL(b), RSM, LYCL RF; Movement "Alternatives", Institute of Globalization and Social Movements.
