= George Sellios =

American businessman and model railroader

George Sellios was the owner of Fine Scale Miniatures (FSM), a business dedicated to producing detailed model kits of structures for model railroad enthusiasts. He is also an accomplished modeler and is well-known in the hobby for his layout, the Franklin & South Manchester Railroad which attracts visitors from around the world.

== Fine Scale Miniatures ==
FSM produced craftsman structure kits from 1967 through 2016 from its location in Peabody, Massachusetts, along with guides to the construction of detailed model railroads.

== Franklin & South Manchester ==
The F&SM uses the same initials as Sellios' company and is co-located in the former FSM company office. It is a stylized model railroad set in 1935 in a fictional area of New England during the Great Depression, characterized by cluttered scenery, colorful billboards and signs, simulated dilapidation, weedy sidewalks, heavy weathering and artistic license.

Active in the hobby since he was 13, Sellios' first influence in the hobby was John Allen who took a novel, whimsical approach to model trains. Allen's influence can be seen in Sellios' work, which favors fantasy over the prototypical. In at least two cases, early Sellios kits are copies of John Allen designs.

Sellios began construction of the F&SM in April 1985. He dedicated approximately three months per year to the endeavor, with the remaining nine dedicated to design and production for his business selling model structure kits. Sellios' F&SM is a large diorama occupying a space measuring approximately 1,600 square feet (150 m^{2}). Sellios' model railroad has become one of the most recognized over the years, with several feature articles in Model Railroader and an episode of Tracks Ahead. Sellios has a large following of model train enthusiasts in the United States, where his exaggerated, caricature style is emulated by hobbyists and cottage industry "craftsman kit" makers.

There are four commercial videos dedicated to the F&SM, produced by the Allen Keller Great Model Railroads series (episodes #2, #24, and #39, and a 2015 production by Trainmasters TV is also available. Most recently, the podcast Wiley’s Bench Time conducted a lengthy audio interview with Mr. Sellios. 39).
