= Revolutionary Workers' Party (Russia) =

Revolutionary Workers' Party Революционная рабочая партия
- Abbreviation: RWP (English); RRP (Russian)
- Leader: Central committee
- Founder: Sergei Biets
- Founded: 7 January 1999; 27 years ago
- Preceded by: Committee for Workers' Democracy and International Socialism
- Headquarters: Moscow/Saint-Petersburg, Russia
- Newspaper: Workers' Democracy
- Membership: 1,000
- Ideology: Marxism; Trotskyism
- Political position: Far-left
- Colours: Red; Black
- Slogan: "All power to the workers!" (Russian: "Вся власть рабочим!") "Workers of the world, unite!" (Russian: "Пролетарии всех стран, соединяйтесь!")
- Anthem: The Internationale

The Revolutionary Workers' Party (RWP; Russian: Революционная рабочая партия; РРП; Revolyutsionnaya rabochaya partiya, RRP) is a Russian Trotskyist organisation established in 1999. From 2002 to 2011 there were two active organisations called the 'Revolutionary Workers' Party'. In April 2011, activists from one of the two, centred in Perm, merged their organisation into the Russian Socialist Movement. In May 2019 part of the RWP split and merged into the International Marxist Tendency, naming themselves Marxist Tendency.

== Origins and early activity ==
The origins of the RWP lie in a series of splits in an earlier Russian Troskyist organisation, the Committee for Workers' Democracy and International Socialism (CWDIS, Russian: Комитет за рабочую демократию и международный социализм, or КРДМС). At the seventh congress of the CWDIS in January 1999, in light of the recent splits, a decision was taken to reform the organisation as the 'Revolutionary Workers' Party', and to join the Committee for a Marxist International. In 2002 the RWP split into three organisations: RWP Moscow, RWP Perm, and a Marxist group called 'Workers' Democracy'. The latter group was the only one to remain a member of the Committee for a Marxist International.

== RWP Perm ==
The RWP in Perm primarily focused on tenants' movements. Activists from the RWP participated in the creation and operation of the Coordinating Council of Protest Actions in the City of Perm and the Perm Council of Hostels, as well as actively participating in the opposition All-Russian Union of Coordinating Councils. The RWP also worked closely with the 'Defence of Labour' Association of Trade Unions. The party published a newspaper called Workers' Democracy.

In 2007, a number of student activists left the organisation to form a new Marxist group, the 'Communist Initiative'. In December 2007, members of the CI joined Sotsialisticheskoye Soprotivleniye (Socialist Resistance), becoming its branch in Perm. On 1 April 2011, both the RWP Perm and Sotsialisticheskoye Soprotivleniye joined the Russian Socialist Movement, uniting to become the Perm regional branch of the RSM.

== RWP Moscow ==
The headquarters of the organisation are based in Moscow; however, branches also exist in Saint Petersburg, Togliatti, Pskov and Voronezh, as well as in Moldova and Kyrgyzstan. The organisation participates in workers' and tenants' movements. In the labour movement, RWP Moscow works inside the official Federation of Independent Trade Unions of Russia and maintains a critical stance towards 'alternative' trade union associations. The party publishes the newspaper Workers' Democracy, as well as a number of regional and factory-based newspapers.

At its XIII Congress on 3–4 May 2019, a split occurred in the party over support for the Communist Party candidate for mayor of Moscow. The majority voted to fuse with the Russian section of the International Marxist Tendency and affiliate to the IMT
