= Pyotr Alexeyev Resistance Movement =

Pyotr Alexeyev Resistance Movement Движение сопротивления имени Петра Алексеева
- Abbreviation: DSPA (English); ДСПА (Russian)
- Leader: Collective leadership
- Founder: Dmitry Zhvania
- Founded: May 1, 2004
- Dissolved: October 21, 2012
- Succeeded by: Russian Socialist Movement
- Headquarters: Saint Petersburg, Russia
- Newspaper: DSPA-Info; Vernoye resheniye (Right Decision)
- Ideology: Socialism; Self-management socialism
- Political position: Far-left
- Colours: Red; Black
- Slogan: "There is only one way out - resistance!" (Russian: "Выход один — сопротивление!")

Party flag

Website
- dspa.info

The Pyotr Alexeyev Resistance Movement (DSPA; Russian: Движение сопротивления имени Петра Алексеева; ДСПА, romanized: Dvizheniye soprotivleniya imeni Petra Alekseyeva) was a left-wing political organization in Russia. It was created in 2004 by Dmitry Zhvania, a journalist and political activist from Saint Petersburg. The DSPA's main activities took place in Saint Petersburg, with several divisions in other cities. The movement was named after revolutionary worker Petr Alekseev.

== Ideology objectives ==
DSPA members believed the expansion of capitalism leads to greater exploitation of poor people, the growth of social inequality, lost freedom and ecological disasters. The DSPA proposed an alternative society based on a socialist planned economy and rational use of resources with the mandatory cultivation of civil and working self-management.

The DSPA stood up for non-violent campaigns of direct action and socialist agitation, providing “here and now” events using available resources. The movement’s ideology rejected the rise to power of the organized group. The main objective of the DSPA’s activities was organizing a large-scale civil resistance movement.

=== Other objectives ===
- Involvement in a struggle for rights of ordinary citizens: workers, students, local civil groups
- Explanation of unity of interests of working organizations and civil groups
- Propaganda of socialist ideals among grassroots social movements

All decisions within the movement were taken by consensus. Anyone who agreed with the DSPA’s charter and participated in the movement’s actions was considered a DSPA member.

== History ==
Before organizing its “here-and-now” campaigns, the movement had a preparation period. During this period all members discussed the movement’s theory, ideology and practice, and established relations with other left-wing groups and organisations.

The main line of activity of the DSPA was street campaigns. On average, in a month the movement provided 3-4 “here-and-now” actions. The DSPA considered that such actions would draw people’s attention to socially relevant issues, and made these issues a subject of public discussion.

== Cooperation with working and civil movements ==
Along with street campaigns, DSPA took part in labor movements and in civil initiatives directed against illegal construction. In 2011, DSPA representatives attended the founding conference of the Russian Socialist Movement.
