= Flail space model =

The flail space model (FSM) is a model of how a car passenger moves in a vehicle that collides with a roadside feature such as a guardrail or a crash cushion. Its principal purpose is to assess the potential risk of harm to the hypothetical occupant as he or she impacts the interior of the passenger compartment and, ultimately, the efficacy of an experimental roadside feature undergoing full-scale vehicle crash testing.

The FSM eliminates the complexity and expense of using instrumented anthropometric dummies during the crash test experiments. Furthermore, while crash test dummies were developed to model collisions between vehicles, they are not accurate when used for the sorts of collision angles that occur when a vehicle collides with a roadside feature; by contrast, the FSM was designed for such collisions.

== History ==
The FSM is based on research performed at Southwest Research Institute in 1980 and published in 1981 in the paper entitled "Collision Risk Assessment Based on Occupant Flail-Space Model" by Jarvis D. Michie. The FSM (coined by Michie) was accepted by the highway community and published as a key part of the "Recommended Procedures for the Safety Evaluation of Highway Appurtenances" published in 1981 in National Cooperative Highway Research Program (NCHRP) Report 230. In 1993, the NCHRP Report was updated and presented as NCHRP Report 350; in this research effort performed by the Texas Transportation Research Institute, the FSM was reexamined and was unmodified in the new publication. In 2004, Douglas Gabauer further examined the efficacy of the FSM in his PhD thesis. The American Association of State Highway and Transportation Officials (AASHTO) retained the FSM as the method of assessing the risk of harm to vehicle occupants in the 2009 "Manual for Assessing Safety Hardware" that replaced NCHRP Report 350, stating that the FSM had "served its intended purpose well".

== Details ==
The FSM hypothesis divides the collision into two stages. In stage one, the unrestrained occupant is propelled forward and sideways in the compartment space due to vehicle collision accelerations and then impacts one or more surfaces (including the steering wheel) with velocity "V". According to the model, the vehicle (instead of the occupant) is the object that is accelerating. The occupant experiences no injury-producing force prior to contact with the compartment surfaces.

In stage two, the occupant is assumed to remain in contact with the compartment surface and experiences the same accelerations as the vehicle for the rest of the collision. The occupant may sustain injury at the end of stage one based on the velocity of impact with the compartment surfaces and due to vehicle accelerations during stage two. The occupant impact velocity and acceleration are computed from the vehicle collision acceleration history and the compartment geometry. Finally, the hypothetical occupant impact velocity and acceleration are then compared to threshold values of human tolerance to these forces.
