= Frequency specific microcurrent =

Introduction of electrical current into damaged soft tissue

Frequency Specific Microcurrent (FSM) or frequency Specific Microcurrent Therapy (FSMT) is the practice of introducing a mild electrical current into an area of damaged soft tissue. Practitioners claim that the introduced current enhances the healing process underway in that same tissue. Critics, such as David Gorski, call proponent's claims of the technique altering body tissue's vibrational amplitude pseudoscience.

== About ==
Frequency Specific Microcurrent uses two channels of microcurrent, with each channel delivering a different frequency. One frequency is proposed to address the condition (such as inflammation or fibrosis), while the second frequency is proposed to target specific tissue (such as nerve or muscle). The frequencies are delivered using microampere-level current, approximately 1/1000 of the intensity of TENS units.

== Usage ==
A 2012 systematic review of physical therapies for Achilles tendinopathy found limited evidence from a single randomized clinical trial suggests FSM as an effective therapy.

A 2010 controlled study of 35 participants found that FSM therapy significantly reduced delayed onset muscle soreness compared to sham treatment at 24, 48, and 72 hours post-exercise.

== Criticism ==
Skeptics note that FSM is another form of vibration medicine and that there is no good evidence that when a tissue is injured it takes on a “different vibrational characteristic”. In addition to the implausibility of the underlying mechanism, critics further argue that the treatment lacks a body or research neither establishing the phenomenon nor the clinical claims.

A 1994 review of electronic devices as potential cancer treatments by the American Cancer Society found the methods to questionable, ineffective, and strongly advises against using them.

Another criticism is that the champion of the modality is a discredited chiropractor.
