= Alexei Navalny =

Russian opposition leader and activist (1976–2024)

- Алексей Навальный
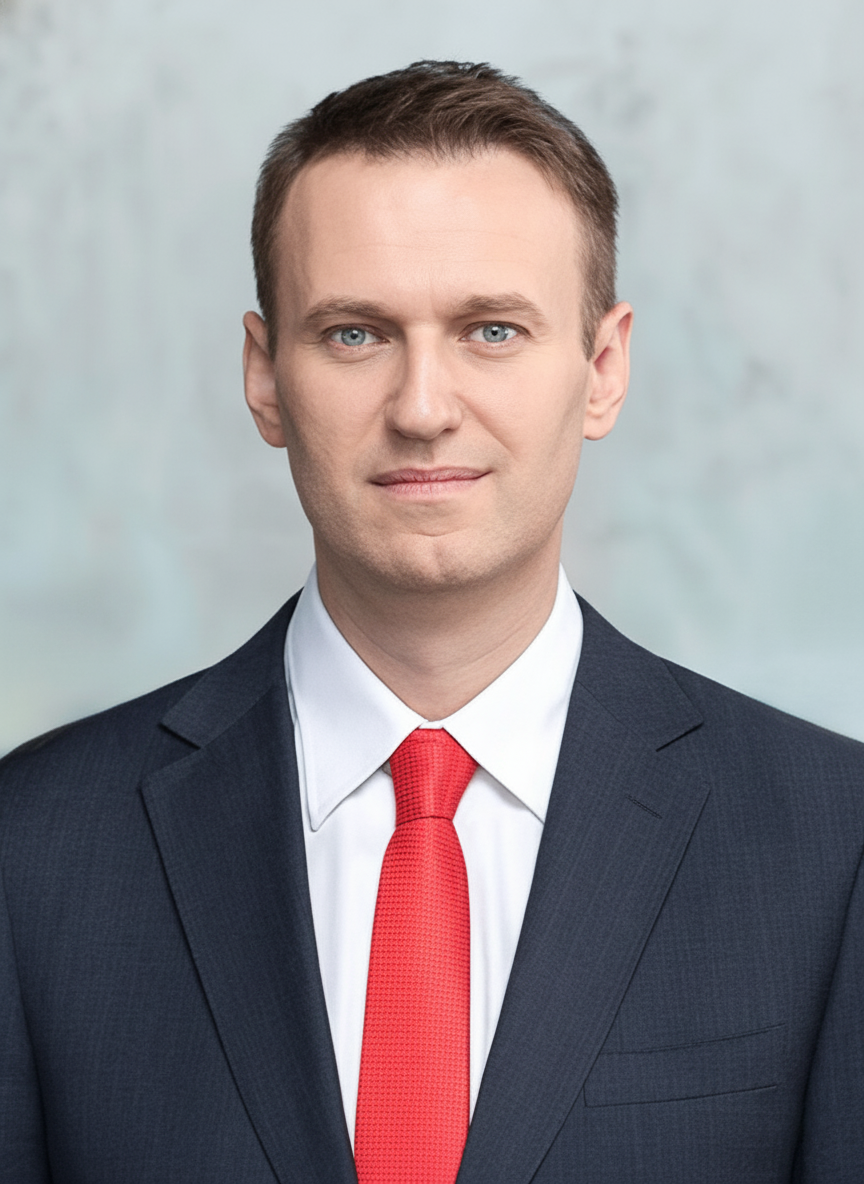
- Navalny in 2018

Chairman of Russia of the Future (Note: Previously known as the People's Alliance (2012–2014) and the Progress Party (2014–2018))
- In office 28 March 2019 – 17 January 2021 (Note: Arrested and subsequently imprisoned)
- Deputy: Leonid Volkov
- Preceded by: Ivan Zhdanov
- Succeeded by: Leonid Volkov (acting)
- In office 17 November 2013 – 19 May 2018
- Preceded by: Office established
- Succeeded by: Ivan Zhdanov

Member of the Russian Opposition Coordination Council
- In office 22 October 2012 – 19 October 2013

Personal details
- Born: 4 June 1976 Butyn, Moscow Oblast, Russian SFSR, Soviet Union
- Died: 16 February 2024 (aged 47) Kharp, Yamalia, Russia
- Resting place: Borisovskoye Cemetery
- Party: Russia of the Future (2013–2021); Independent (2007–2013); Yabloko (2000–2007)
- Other political affiliations: NAROD (2007–2011); Navalny Headquarters (2017–2021)
- Spouse: Yulia Abrosimova (m. 2000)
- Children: 2
- Education: Peoples' Friendship University of Russia; Financial University under the Government of the Russian Federation
- Occupation: Politician; activist; blogger
- Known for: Anti-corruption activism
- Website: navalny.com, NavalnyLiveChannel

YouTube information
- Channel: Алексей Навальный
- Subscribers: 6.17 million
- Views: 1.62 billion
- Last updated: 14 February 2026
- Navalny's voice (in Russian) Recorded 2013

Alexei Anatolyevich Navalny (Note: In this name that follows East Slavic naming customs, the patronymic is Anatolyevich and the family name is Navalny.) (Note: Sometimes transliterated as Alexey, Aleksei or Aleksey.) (Russian: Алексей Анатольевич Навальный, IPA: [ɐlʲɪkˈsʲej ɐnɐˈtolʲjɪvʲɪtɕ nɐˈvalʲnɨj]; 4 June 1976 – 16 February 2024) was a Russian opposition leader, anti-corruption activist and political prisoner. He founded the Anti-Corruption Foundation (FBK) in 2011. He was recognised by Amnesty International as a prisoner of conscience and was awarded the Sakharov Prize for his work on human rights.

Through his social media accounts, Navalny and his team published material about corruption in Russia, organised political demonstrations and promoted his campaigns. In a 2011 interview, he described Russia's ruling party, United Russia, as a "party of crooks and thieves", which became a popular byname. Navalny and the FBK have published investigations detailing alleged corruption by high-ranking Russian officials and their associates.

Navalny twice received a suspended sentence for embezzlement, in 2013 and 2014. Both criminal cases have been widely considered politically motivated and intended to bar him from running in future elections. He ran in the 2013 Moscow mayoral election and came in second with 27.2% of the vote, but was barred from running in the 2018 presidential election.

In August 2020, Navalny was hospitalised after being severely poisoned with a Novichok nerve agent. He was medically evacuated to Berlin and discharged a month later. He accused President Vladimir Putin of being responsible for his poisoning, and an investigation implicated agents from the Federal Security Service. In January 2021, Navalny returned to Russia and was immediately detained on accusations of violating parole conditions while hospitalised in Germany. Following his arrest, mass protests were held across Russia. The next month, Navalny's suspended sentence was replaced with a prison sentence of two years and eight months, and his organisations were later designated as extremist and liquidated. In March 2022, Navalny was sentenced to an additional nine years in prison after being found guilty of embezzlement and contempt of court in a new trial described as a sham by Amnesty International. Following the rejection of his appeal, Navalny was transferred to a high-security prison in June. In August 2023, he received another sentence of 19 years on extremism charges.

In December 2023, Navalny went missing from prison for almost three weeks. He re-emerged in an Arctic Circle corrective colony in the Yamalo-Nenets Autonomous Okrug. In 2024, the Russian prison service reported that Navalny had died.

== Early life ==
Alexei Anatolyevich Navalny was born on 4 June 1976 in Butyn, Moscow Oblast, Russian SFSR, Soviet Union. His mother, Lyudmila Ivanovna Navalnaya (born 1954), is a Russian originally from Zelenograd, Moscow, and his father, Anatoly Ivanovich Navalny (born 1947), is a Ukrainian from Zalissia, a village near the Belarus–Ukraine border which was relocated due to nuclear contamination caused by the 1986 Chernobyl disaster. Navalny identified as half Russian and half Ukrainian. Media regularly asked him whether he identified more as Russian or Ukrainian, and he stated in his posthumously published memoir, Patriot, "It was like being asked who you loved more, your mother or your father."

Navalny grew up in Obninsk, Kaluga Oblast, and spent his summers with Anatoly's parents in Zalissia until the age of eight, acquiring proficiency in Ukrainian. Anatoly and Lyudmila privately own a basket-weaving factory, which the couple have run since 1994, in the village of Kobyakovo, Vologda Oblast; they were still running the factory as of 2012.

== Education ==
Navalny graduated from Kalininets secondary school (level 3 according to the ISCED) in 1993. He graduated from the Peoples' Friendship University of Russia in 1998 with a law degree. He then studied securities and exchanges at the Financial University under the Government of the Russian Federation, graduating in 2001.

In 2010, upon recommendation from Garry Kasparov, Yevgeniya Albats and Sergey Guriev, Navalny received a scholarship to the Yale World Fellows program at Yale University, where he studied political science and world affairs. As a World Fellow at Yale University's World Fellows Program, Navalny aimed at "creating a global network of emerging leaders and to broaden international understanding" in 2010.

== Legal career ==
From 1998 onward, Navalny worked as a corporate lawyer for various Russian companies.

In 2009, Navalny became an advocate and a member of advocate's chamber (bar association) of Kirov Oblast (registration number 43/547). In 2010, due to his move to Moscow, he ceased to be a member of advocate's chamber of Kirov Oblast and became a member of advocate's chamber of Moscow (registration number 77/9991).

In November 2013, after the judgement in the Kirovles case had entered into force, Navalny was deprived of advocate status.

== Political activity ==
=== Yabloko ===
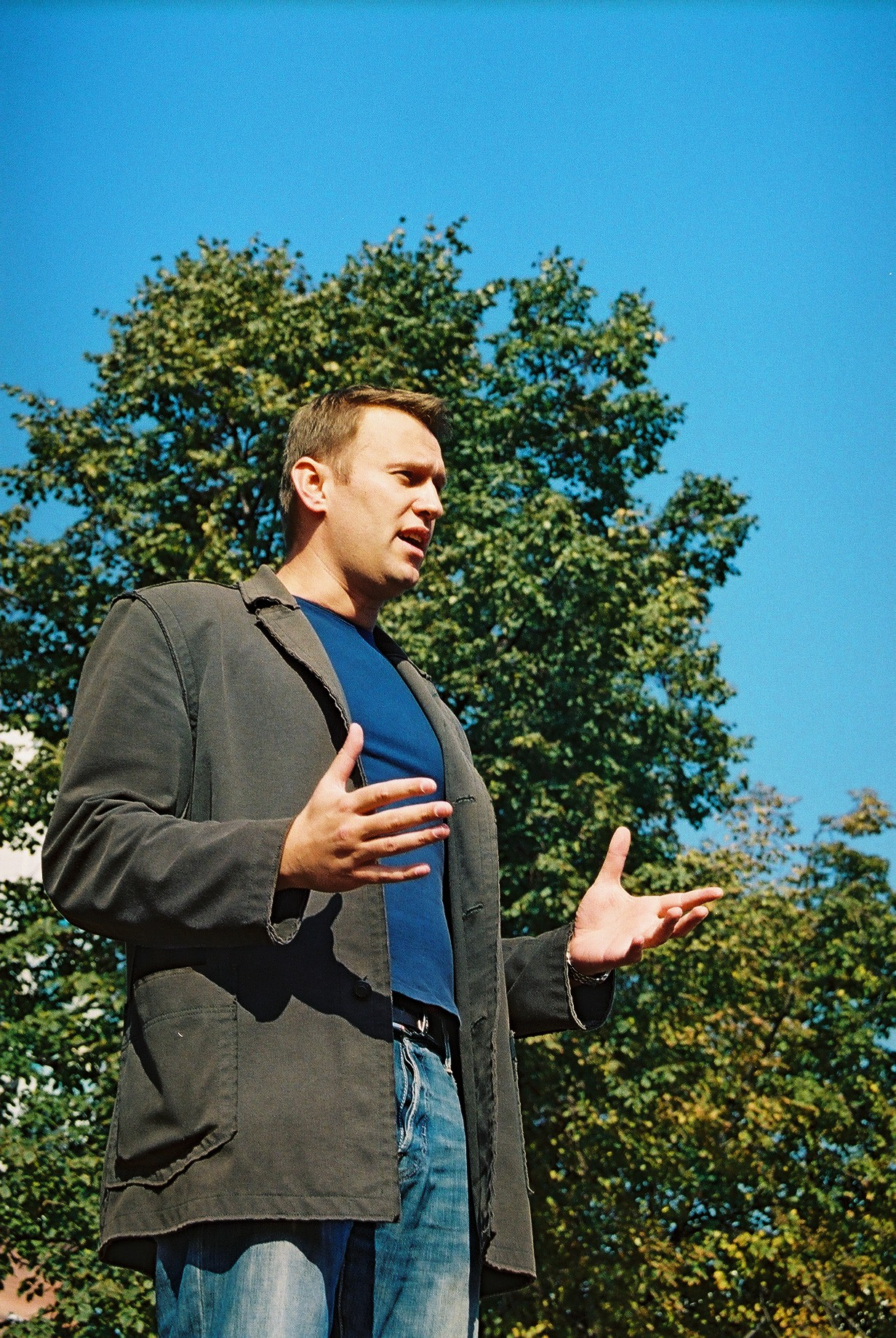
Navalny in 2006

In 2000, following the announcement of a new law that raised the electoral threshold for State Duma elections, Navalny joined the Russian United Democratic Party Yabloko. According to Navalny, the law was stacked against Yabloko and Union of Right Forces, and he decided to join, even though he was not "a big fan" of either organisation. In 2001, he was listed as a member of the party. In 2002, he was elected to the regional council of the Moscow branch of Yabloko. In 2003, he headed the Moscow subdivision of the election campaign of the party for the parliamentary election held in December. In April 2004, Navalny became Chief of Staff of the Moscow branch of Yabloko, where he remained until February 2007. Also in 2004, he became Deputy Chief of the Moscow branch of the party. From 2006 to 2007, he was a member of the Federal Council of the party.

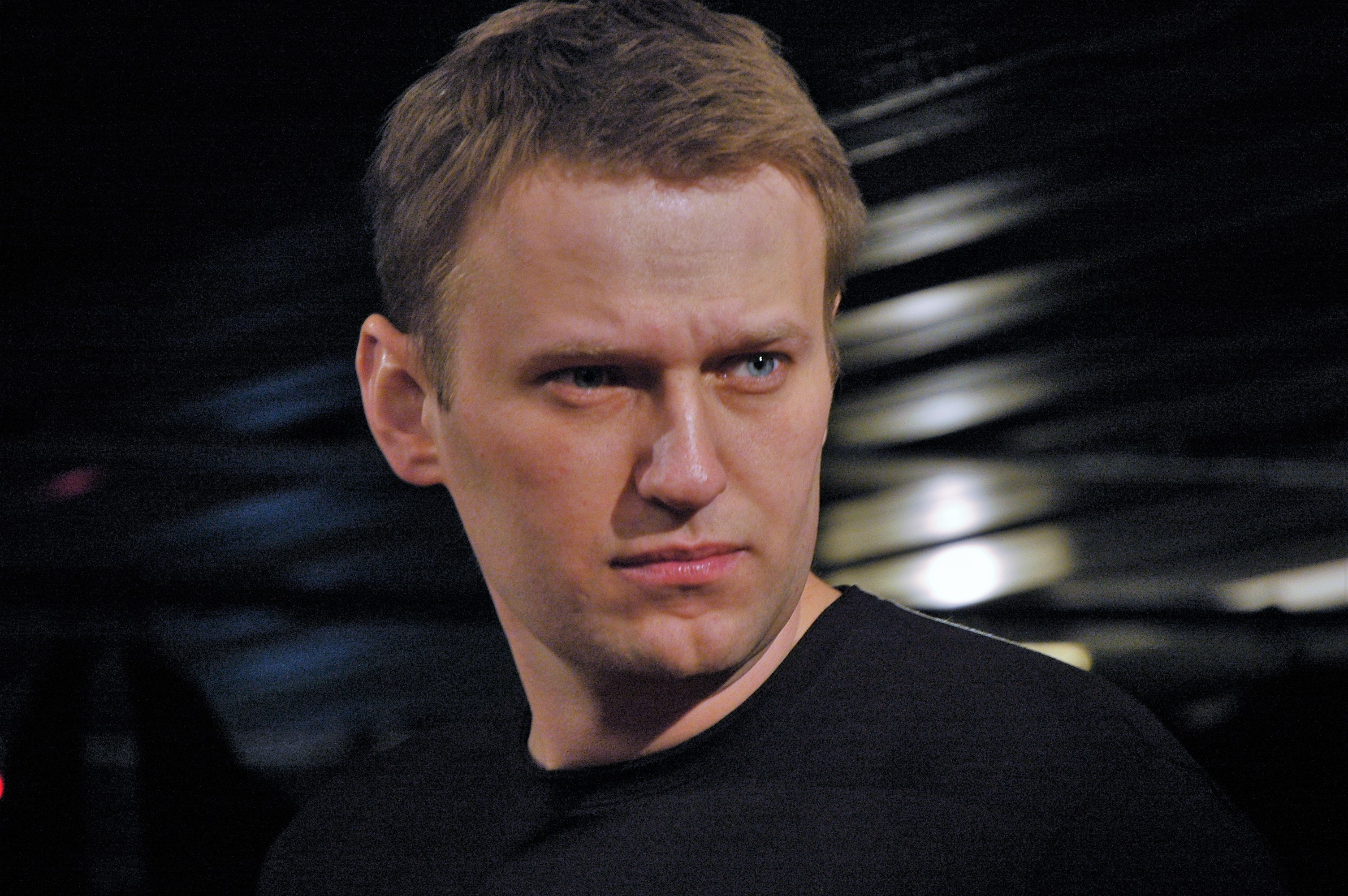
Navalny in 2007

In August 2005, Navalny was admitted to the Social Council of the Central Administrative Okrug of Moscow, created before the Moscow City Duma election held later that year, in which he took part as a candidate. In November, he was one of the initiators of the Youth Public Chamber, intended to help younger politicians take part in legislative initiatives. At the same time, in 2005, Navalny started another youth social movement, named "DA! – Democratic Alternative". (Note: The Russian word "да" (da) means "yes".) The project was not connected to Yabloko or any other political party. Within the movement, Navalny participated in several projects. In particular, he was one of the organisers of the movement-run political debates, which soon resonated in the media. Navalny also organised television debates via state-run Moscow channel TV Center; two initial episodes showed high ratings, but the show was suddenly canceled. According to Navalny, the authorities prohibited the appearance of certain people on television.

In late 2006, Navalny appealed to the Moscow City Hall, asking it to grant permission to conduct the nationalist 2006 Russian march. However, he added that Yabloko condemned "any ethnic or racial hatred and any xenophobia" and called on the police to oppose "any fascist, Nazi, xenophobic manifestations". (Note: Argued as following: "It is clearly stated in the preamble of our declaration that the Yabloko Party thoroughly and sharply opposes any national and racial discord and any xenophobia. However, in this case, when we know ... that the Constitution guarantees us the right to gather peacefully and without a weapon, we see that in these conditions the prohibition of the Russian March as it was announced, provokes the organisers to some activities that could end not so well. Thus we appeal to the Moscow City Hall ... for permission.")

In December 2007, Yabloko lost legislative election to Russian State Duma by receiving only 1.6% votes. At a meeting of the party bureau, Navalny had proposed to reform the party and change its leadership because of the failure in the elections. He sharply criticized many actions by the party and asked for "immediate resignation of the party chairman and all his deputies, re-election of at least 70 percent of the bureau". He said: "Yabloko completely failed in these elections ... This is not a matter of counting [the votes]. The elections were dishonest and unfair. But we would get even less in fair elections. Because fair elections should not be just a live broadcast for Grigory Alekseevich. Everyone must be able to participate. This means that the more popular Kasparov and Ryzhkov would have been on the same live broadcast. This means that Kasyanov with his financial resources would take part in the elections. ... I argue that Yabloko has collapsed because it has turned itself to a sect. We demand that everyone must be a democrat, but we don't want to be democrats ourselves. ... And the worse the results, the stronger the leadership's position." He was expelled from Yabloko at the same meeting for his nationalist views and for participating in the Russian March. According to Russian opposition politician Ilya Yashin, Navalny was expelled from Yabloko because he challenged party leader Grigory Yavlinsky.

=== 2011 parliamentary election and protests ===
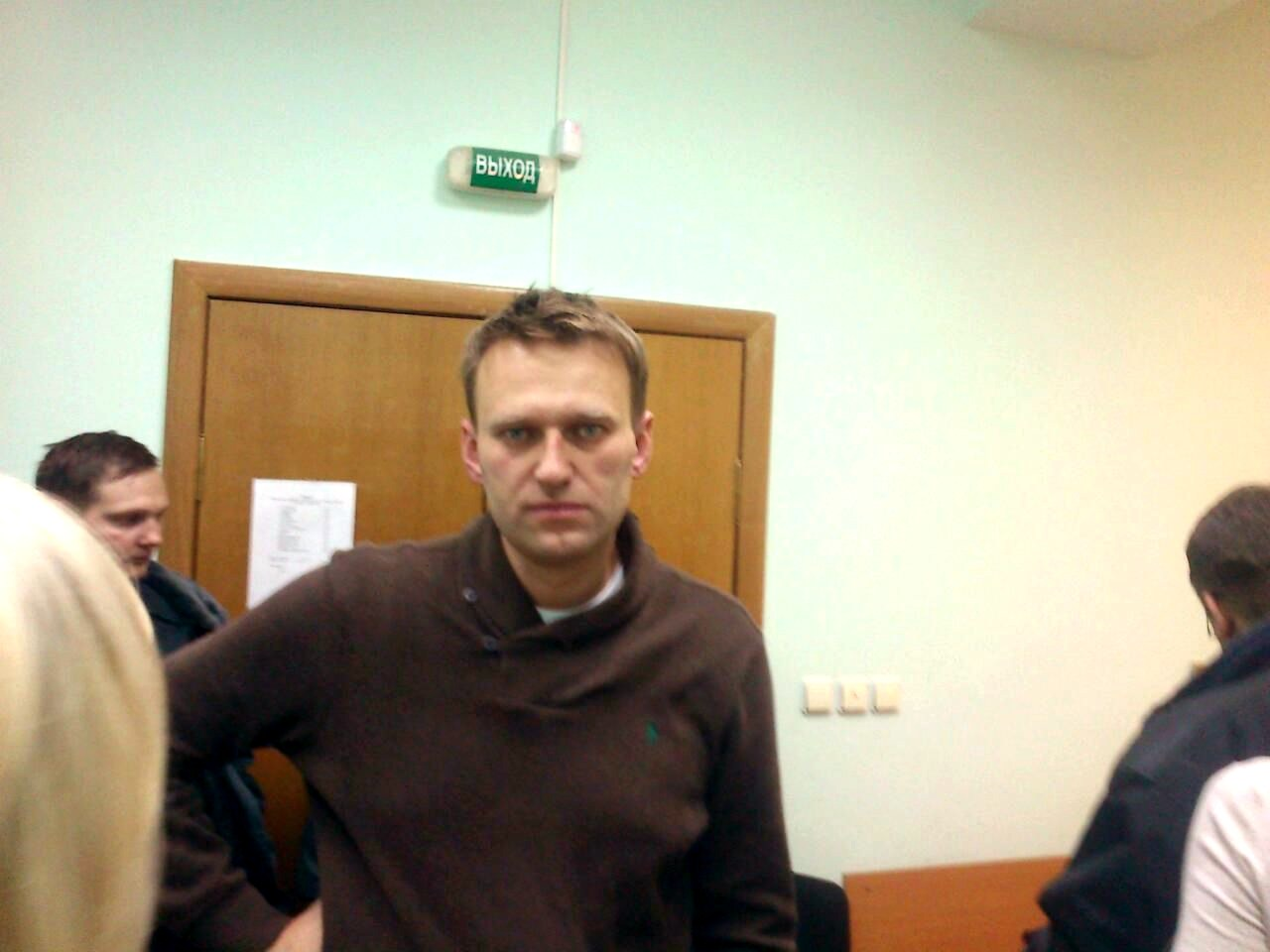
Navalny at the courthouse, 6 December 2011

In December 2011, after parliamentary elections and accusations of electoral fraud, approximately 6,000 people gathered in Moscow to protest the contested result, and an estimated 300 people were arrested, including Navalny. Navalny was arrested on 5 December. After a period of uncertainty for his supporters, Navalny appeared in court and was sentenced to a maximum of 15 days "for defying a government official". Alexei Venediktov, editor-in-chief of Echo of Moscow radio station, called the arrest "a political mistake: jailing Navalny transforms him from an online leader into an offline one". After his arrest, his blog became available in English. Navalny was kept in the same prison as several other activists, including Ilya Yashin and Sergei Udaltsov, the unofficial leader of the Vanguard of Red Youth, a radical Russian communist youth group. Udaltsov went on a hunger strike to protest against the conditions.

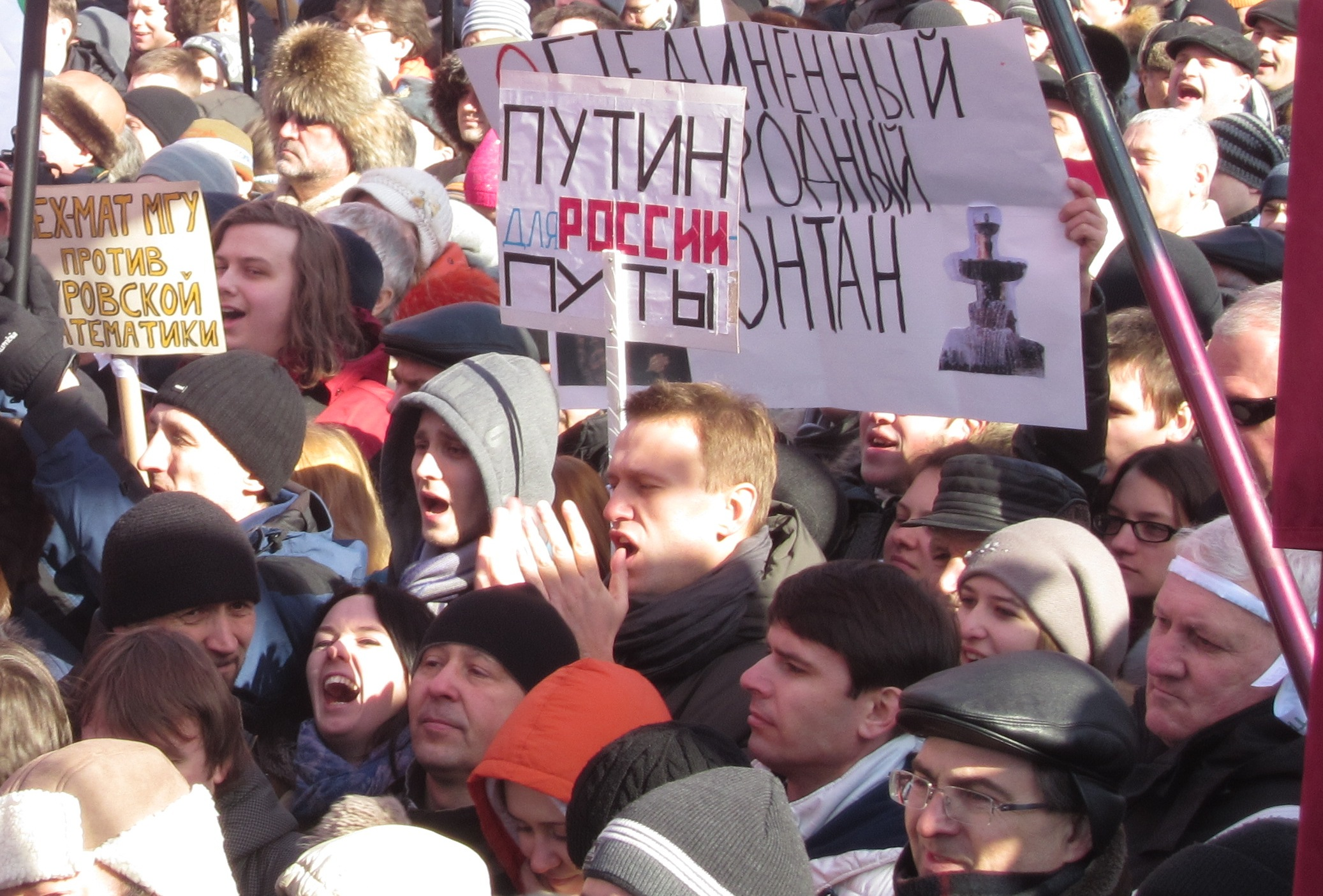
Navalny at a Moscow rally, 10 March 2012

Upon his release on 20 December 2011, Navalny called on Russians to unite against Putin, who Navalny said would try to claim victory in the presidential election, which was held on 4 March 2012.

After his release, Navalny informed reporters that it would be senseless for him to run in the presidential elections because the Kremlin would not allow the elections to be fair, but if free elections were held, he would "be ready" to run. On 24 December, he helped lead a demonstration, estimated at 50,000 people, which was much larger than the previous post-election demonstration. Speaking to the crowd, he said, "I see enough people to take the Kremlin right now".

In March 2012, after Putin was elected president, Navalny helped lead an anti-Putin rally in Moscow's Pushkinskaya Square, attended by between 14,000 and 20,000 people. After the rally, Navalny was detained by authorities for several hours, and then released. On 8 May 2012, the day after Putin was inaugurated, Navalny and Udaltsov were arrested after an anti-Putin rally at Clean Ponds, and were each given 15-day jail sentences. Amnesty International designated the two men prisoners of conscience. On 11 June, Moscow prosecutors conducted a 12-hour search of Navalny's home, office, and the apartment of one of his relatives. Soon afterwards, some of Navalny's personal emails were posted online by a pro-government blogger.

=== New party ===
On 26 June 2012, it was announced that Navalny's comrades would establish a new political party based on e-democracy; Navalny declared he did not plan to participate in this project at the moment. On 31 July, they filed a document to register an organising committee of a future party named "The People's Alliance". The party identified itself as centrist; one of the then-current leaders of the party, and Navalny's ally Vladimir Ashurkov, explained this was intended to help the party get a large share of voters. Navalny said the concept of political parties was "outdated", and added his participation would make maintaining the party more difficult. However, he "blessed" the party and discussed its maintenance with its leaders. They, in turn, stated they wanted to eventually see Navalny as a member of the party. On 15 December 2012 Navalny expressed his support of the party, saying, "The People's Alliance is my party", but again refused to join it, citing the criminal cases against him.

On 10 April 2013, the party filed documents for the official registration of the party. On 30 April, the registration of the party was suspended. On 5 July 2013 the party was declined registration; according to Izvestia, not all founders of the party were present during the congress, even though the papers contained their signatures. Navalny reacted to that with a tweet saying, "A salvo of all guns." Following the mayoral election, on 15 September 2013, Navalny declared he would join and, possibly, head the party. On 17 November 2013 Navalny was elected as the leader of the party.

On 8 January 2014, Navalny's party filed documents for registration for the second time. On 20 January, registration of the party was suspended; according to Russian laws, no two parties can share a name. On 8 February 2014, Navalny's party changed its name to "Progress Party". On 25 February 2014, the party was registered, and at this point, had six months to register regional branches in at least half of the federal subjects of Russia. (Note: Article 15, section 7: "Terms, as provided by sections 4 and 6 of the present article, are prolonged if a territorial body has passed a verdict of suspension of state registration of a regional branch of a political party, as provided by section 5.1 of the present article, or a verdict of denial of state registration of a regional branch of a political party has been challenged to a court and, as of the day of expiration of the said terms, has not gone into effect." The following section is given as in force as on 2 April 2012 (the section had not changed by 1 May 2015).) On 26 September 2014, the party declared it had registered 43 regional branches.

An unnamed source of Izvestia in the ministry said registrations completed after the six-month term would not be taken into consideration, adding, "Yes, trials are taking place in some regions ... they cannot register new branches in other regions during the trials, because the main term is over". Navalny's blog countered, "Our answer is simple. A six-month term for registration has been legally prolonged ad interim prosecution of appeals of denials and registration suspensions".

On 1 February 2015, the party held a convention, where Navalny stated the party was preparing for the 2016 elections, declaring the party would maintain its activity across Russia, saying, "We are unabashed to work in remote lands where the opposition does not work. We can even [work] in Crimea". The candidates the party would appoint were to be chosen via primary elections; however, he added, the party's candidates may be removed from elections. On 17 April 2015, the party initiated a coalition of democratic parties. On 28 April 2015, the party was deprived of registration by the Ministry of Justice, which stated the party had not registered the required number of regional branches within six months after the official registration. Krainev claimed that the party could be eliminated only by the Supreme Court, and he added that not all trials of registration of regional branches were over, calling the verdict "illegal twice". He added that the party would appeal to the European Court of Human Rights, and expressed confidence that the party would be restored and admitted to elections. The next day, the party officially challenged the verdict.

=== 2013 Moscow mayoral candidacy ===
Ratings of Sobyanin and Navalny among those who said they would vote, according to Synovate Comcon polls
| Time | Sobyanin | Navalny | Ref |
|---|---|---|---|
| 29 August–2 September | 60.1% | 21.9% |
| 22–28 August | 63.9% | 19.8% |
| 15–21 August | 62.5% | 20.3% |
| 8–14 August | 63.5% | 19.9% |
| 1–7 August | 74.6% | 15.0% |
| 25–31 July | 76.2% | 16.7% |
| 18–24 July | 76.6% | 15.7% |
| 11–16 July | 76.2% | 14.4% |
| 4–10 July | 78.5% | 10.7% |
| 27 June–3 July | 77.9% | 10.8% |

Percentages of Muscovites who voted for Navalny during the election

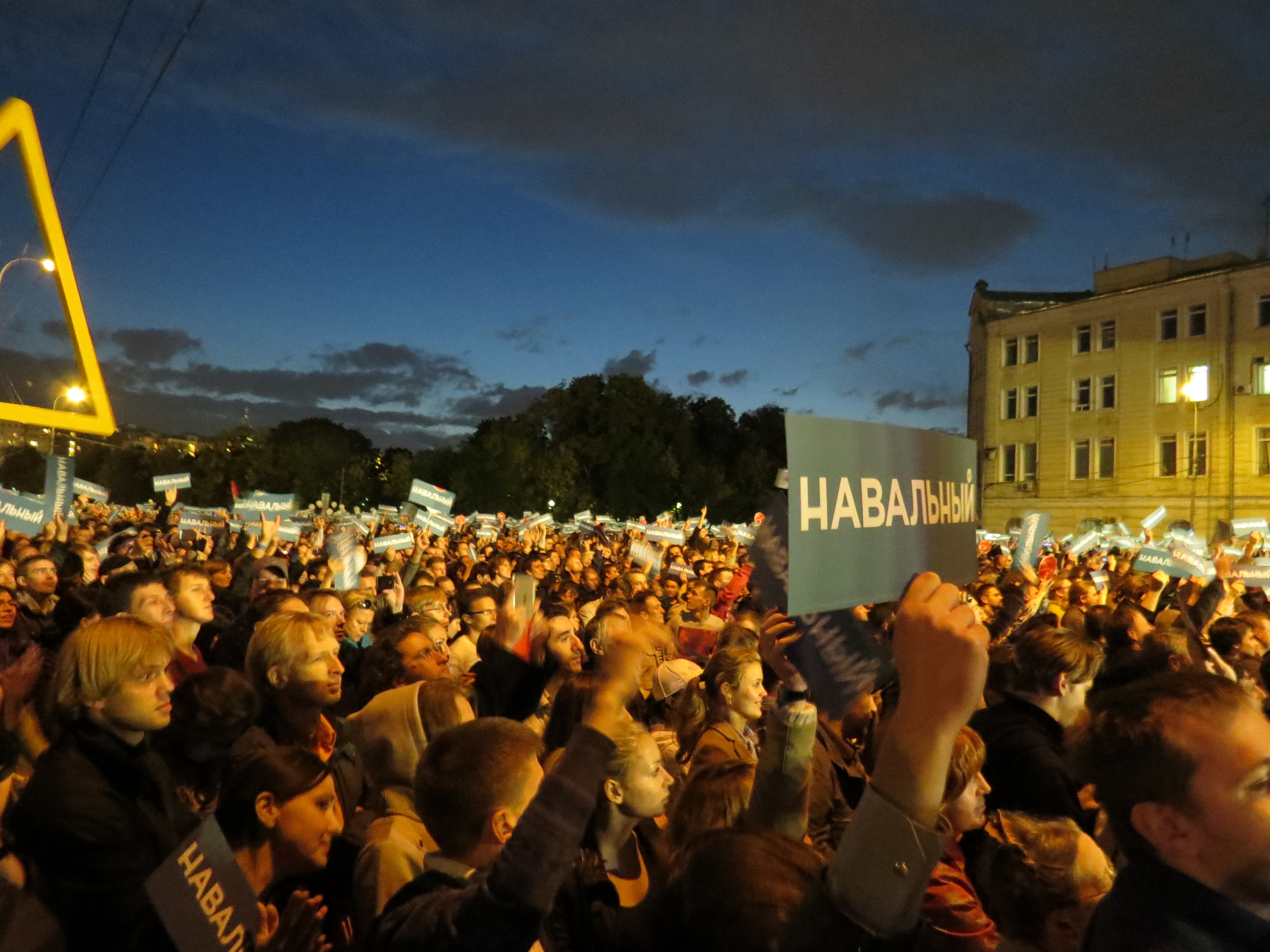
Navalny's meeting at Bolotnaya Square in Moscow, 9 September 2013

On 30 May 2013, Sergey Sobyanin, the mayor of Moscow, argued an elected mayor is an advantage for the city compared to an appointed one, and on 4 June, he announced he would meet President Vladimir Putin and ask him for a snap election, mentioning the Muscovites would agree the governor elections should take place in the city of Moscow and the surrounding Moscow Oblast simultaneously. On 6 June, the request was granted, and the next day, the Moscow City Duma appointed the election on 8 September, the national voting day.

On 3 June, Navalny announced he would run for the post. To become an official candidate, he would need either seventy thousand signatures of Muscovites or to be pegged for the office by a registered party, and then to collect 110 signatures of municipal deputies from 110 different subdivisions (three-quarters of Moscow's 146). Navalny chose to be pegged by a party, RPR–PARNAS.

Among the six candidates who were officially registered as such, only two (Sobyanin and Communist Ivan Melnikov) were able to collect the required number of the signatures themselves, and the other four were given a number of signatures by the Council of Municipal Formations, following a recommendation by Sobyanin, to overcome the requirement (Navalny accepted 49 signatures, and other candidates accepted 70, 70, and 82).

On 17 July, Navalny was registered as one of the six candidates for the Moscow mayoral election. On 18 July, he was sentenced to a five-year prison term for the embezzlement and fraud charges that were declared in 2012. Several hours after his sentencing, he pulled out of the race and called for a boycott of the election. Later that day, the prosecution office requested that Navalny be freed on bail and released from travel restrictions, since the verdict had not yet taken legal effect, saying that he had previously followed the restrictions. Navalny was a mayoral candidate, and imprisonment would thus not comply with the rule for equal access to the electorate. On his return to Moscow after being freed, pending an appeal, he vowed to stay in the race. The Washington Post has speculated that his release was ordered by the Kremlin in order to make the election and Sobyanin appear more legitimate.

Navalny's campaign was successful in fundraising: out of 103.4 million rubles ($3.25 million as of the election day (Note: According to the exchange rates set by the Central Bank of Russia for 8 September 2013.)), the total size of his electoral fund, 97.3 million ($3.06 million) were transferred by individuals throughout Russia; such an amount is unprecedented in Russia. It achieved a high profile through an unprecedentedly large campaign organisation that involved around 20,000 volunteers who passed out leaflets and hung banners, in addition to conducting several campaign rallies a day around the city; they were the main driving force for the campaign. The New Yorker described the resulted campaign as "a miracle", along with Navalny's release on 19 July, the fundraising campaign, and the personality of Navalny himself. The campaign received very little television coverage and did not utilise billboards. Thanks to Navalny's strong campaign (and Sobyanin's weak one), his result grew over time, weakening Sobyanin's, and in the end of the campaign, he declared the runoff election (to be conducted if none of the candidates receives at least 50% of votes) was "a hair's breadth away".

The largest sociological research organisations predicted that Sobyanin would win the election, scoring 58% to 64% of the vote; they expected Navalny to receive 15–20% of the vote, and the turnout was to be 45–52%. (Levada Center was the only one not to have made any predictions; the data it had on 28 August was similar to that of other organisations.) The final results of the voting showed Navalny received 27% of the vote, more than candidates appointed by the parties that received second, third, fourth, and fifth highest results during the 2011 parliamentary elections, altogether. Navalny fared better in the center and southwest of Moscow, which have higher income and education levels. Sobyanin received 51% of the vote, winning the election. The turnout was 32%. The organisations explained the differences were because Sobyanin's electorate did not vote, as they felt that their candidate was guaranteed to win. Navalny's campaign office predicted Sobyanin would score 49–51%, and Navalny would get 24–26% of votes.

Many experts said the election had been fair, that the number of irregularities had been much lower than those of other elections held within the country, and that the irregularities had had little effect on the result. Dmitri Abyzalov, leading expert of Center of Political Conjuncture, added low turnout figures provide a further sign of fairness of the election, because that shows they were not overestimated. However, according to Andrei Buzin, co-chairman of the GOLOS Association, State Departments of Social Security added people who did not originally want to vote to lists of those who would vote at home, with the number of such voters being 5% of those who voted, and added this did cause questions if Sobyanin would score 50% if this did not take place. Dmitry Oreshkin, leader of the "People's election commission" project (who did a separate counting based on the data from election observers; their result for Sobyanin was 50%), said now that the runoff election was only 2% away, all details would be looked at very closely, and added it was impossible to prove "anything" juridically.

On 9 September, the day following the election, Navalny publicly denounced the tally, saying, "We do not recognise the results. They are fake". Sobyanin's office rejected an offer of a vote recount. On 12 September, Navalny addressed the Moscow City Court to overturn the result of the poll; the court rejected the assertion. Navalny then challenged the decision in the Supreme Court of Russia, but the court ruled that the election results were legitimate.

=== RPR-PARNAS and democratic coalition ===
Following the mayoral election, Navalny was offered a position as the fourth co-chairman of RPR-PARNAS. On 14 November 2014, the two remaining RPR-PARNAS co-chairmen, Boris Nemtsov and former Prime Minister of Russia Mikhail Kasyanov, declared it was the right moment to create a wide coalition of political forces, who favour the "European choice"; Navalny's Progress Party was seen as one of the potential participants. However, on 27 February 2015, Nemtsov was shot dead. Prior to his assassination, Nemtsov worked on a project of a coalition, in which Navalny and Khodorkovsky would become co-chairmen of RPR-PARNAS. Navalny declared merging parties would invoke bureaucratic difficulties and question the legitimacy of party's right to participate in federal elections without signatures collecting. However, Nemtsov's murder accelerated the work, and on 17 April, Navalny declared a wide discussion had taken place among Progress Party, RPR-PARNAS, and other closely aligned parties, which resulted in an agreement of formation of a new electoral bloc between the two leaders. Soon thereafter, it was signed by four other parties and supported by Khodorkovsky's Open Russia foundation. Electoral blocs are not present within the current law system of Russia, so it would be realised via means of a single party, RPR-PARNAS, which is not only eligible for participation in statewide elections, but is also currently not required to collect citizens' signatures for the right to participate in the State Duma elections scheduled for September 2016, due to the regional parliament mandate previously taken by Nemtsov. The candidates RPR-PARNAS would appoint were to be chosen via primary elections.

On 5 July 2015, Kasyanov was elected as the only leader of RPR-PARNAS, and the party was renamed to just PARNAS. He added he would like to eventually re-establish the institution of co-chairmanship, adding, "Neither Alexei Navalny nor Mikhail Khodorkovsky will enter our party today and be elected as co-chairmen. But in the future, I think, such time will come". On 7 July, in an interview released by TV Rain, he specified Navalny could not leave a party of his, and this would need to be completed by PARNAS adsorbing members of the Progress Party and other parties of the coalition, and Navalny would be to come at some point when he "grows into this and feels this could be done" and join the party as well.

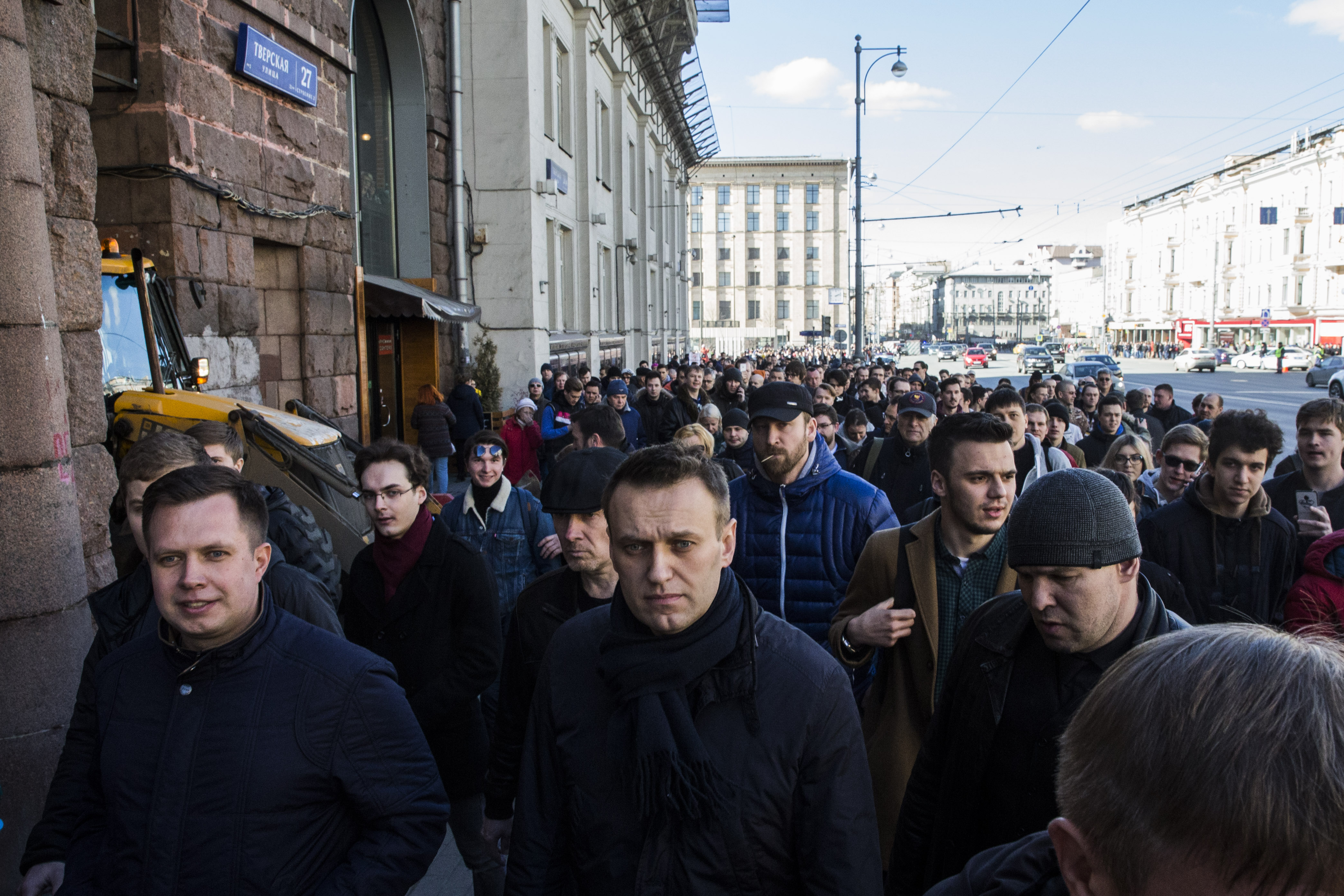
Protesters marching along Moscow's Tverskaya Street, 26 March 2017

The coalition claimed to have collected enough citizens' signatures for registration in the four regions it originally aimed for. However, in one region, the coalition would declare some signatures and personal data have been altered by malevolent collectors; signatures in the other regions have been rejected by regional election commissions. In Novosibirsk Oblast, some election office staff went on a hunger strike, which was abandoned almost two weeks since its inception, when Khodorkovsky, Navalny, and Kasyanov publicly advised to do so. Сomplaints have been issued to the Central Election Commission of Russia, after which the coalition has been registered as a participant in a regional election in one of the three contested regions, Kostroma Oblast. According to a source of Gazeta.ru "close to the Kremlin", the presidential administration saw coalition's chances as very low, yet was wary, but the restoration in one region occurred so PARNAS could "score a consolation goal". According to the official election results, the coalition scored 2% of votes, not enough to overcome the 5% threshold; the party admitted the election was lost.

=== 2018 presidential election ===
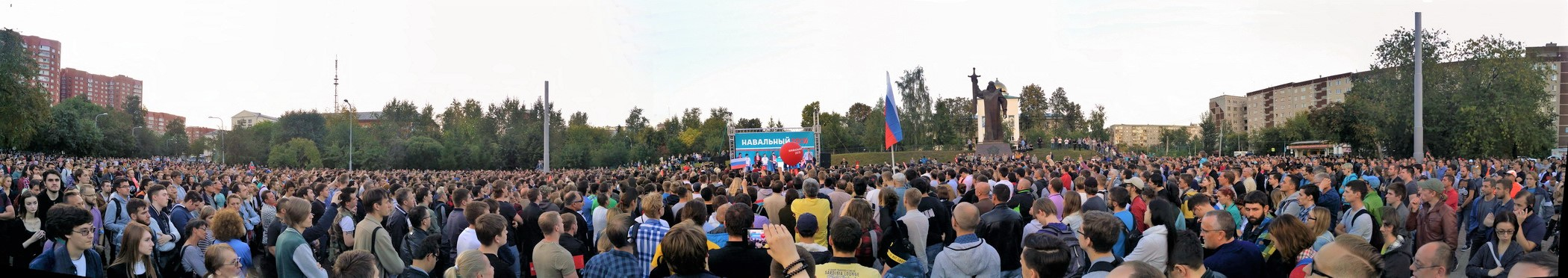
Navalny meeting his followers in Yekaterinburg on 16 September 2017

With growing popular support Navalny announced his entry into the presidential race on 13 December 2016, however on 8 February 2017, the Leninsky district court of Kirov repeated its sentence of 2013 (after the case has been sent to a new trial with a different judge by the Supreme Court which annulled the initial sentence after the decision of ECHR, which ruled that Russia had violated Navalny's right to a fair trial, in the Kirovles case) and re-sentenced him with a five-year suspended sentence. This sentence, if it came into force and remained valid, might prohibit the future official registration of Navalny as a candidate. Navalny announced that he would pursue the annulment of the sentence that clearly contradicts the decision of ECHR. Moreover, Navalny announced that his presidential campaign would proceed independently of court decisions. He referred to the Russian Constitution (Article 32), which deprives only two groups of citizens of the right to be elected: those recognised by the court as legally unfit and those kept in places of confinement by a court sentence. According to Freedom House and The Economist, Navalny was the most viable contender to Vladimir Putin in the 2018 election. Navalny organised a series of anti-corruption rallies in different cities across Russia in March. This appeal was responded to by the representatives of 95 Russian cities, and four cities abroad: London, Prague, Basel and Bonn.

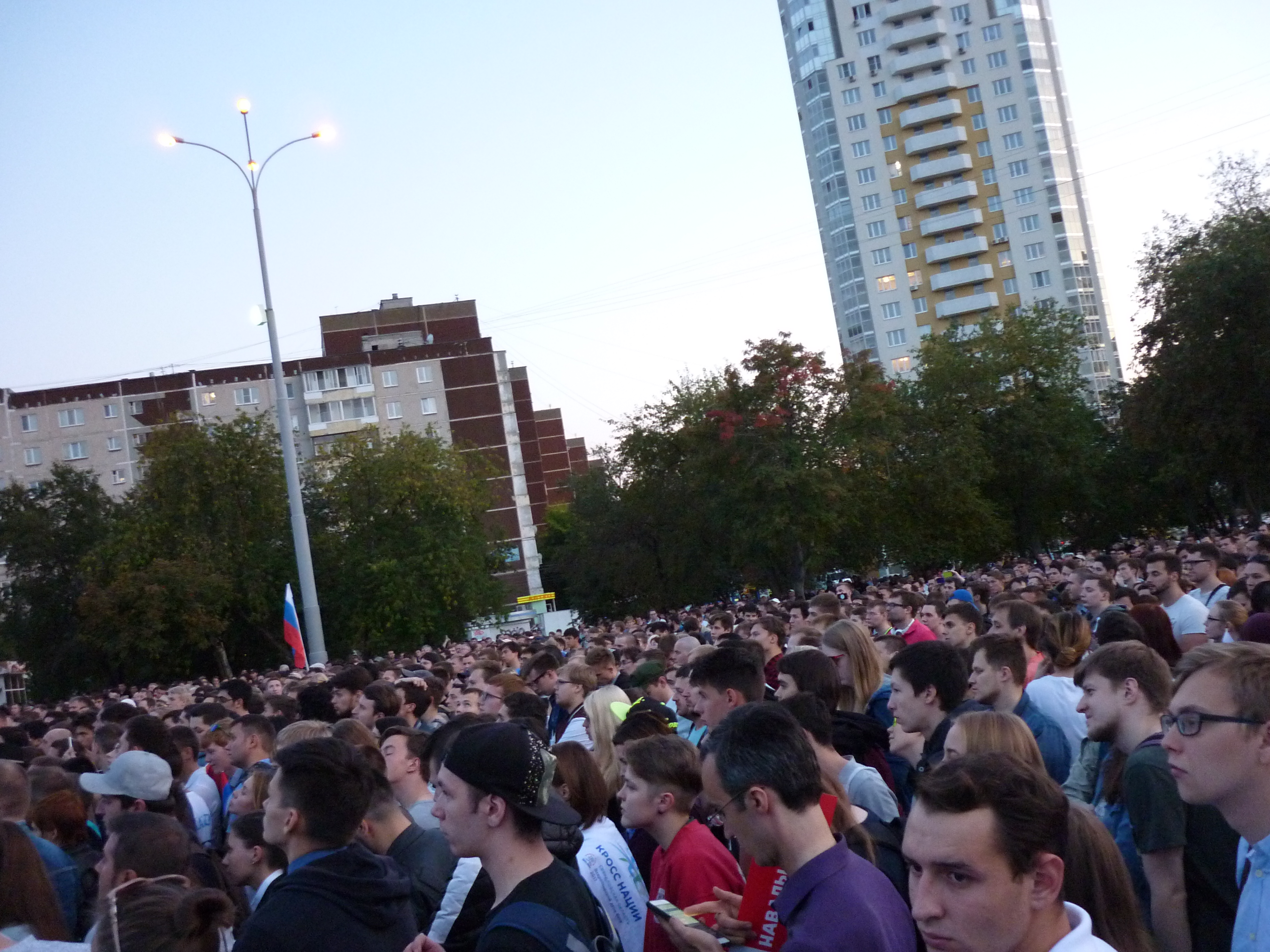
Navalny's campaign rally in Yekaterinburg, 16 September 2017

Navalny was attacked by unknown assailants outside his office in the Anti-Corruption Foundation on 27 April 2017. They sprayed brilliant green dye, possibly mixed with other components, into his face in a Zelyonka attack that can damage eyes of the victim. He had been attacked before, earlier in the spring. In the second attack, the green-colored disinfectant had evidently been mixed with a caustic chemical, resulting in a chemical burn to his right eye. He reportedly lost 80 percent of the sight in his right eye. Navalny accused the Kremlin of orchestrating the attack.

Navalny was released from jail on 27 July 2017 after spending 25 days of imprisonment. Before that, he was arrested in Moscow for participating in protests and was sentenced to 30 days in jail for organising illegal protests.

In September 2017, Human Rights Watch accused Russian police of systematic interference with Navalny's presidential campaign. "The pattern of harassment and intimidation against Navalny's campaign is undeniable," said Hugh Williamson, Europe, and Central Asia director at Human Rights Watch. "Russian authorities should let Navalny's campaigners work without undue interference and properly investigate attacks against them by ultra-nationalists and pro-government groups." On 21 September, the Committee of Ministers of the Council of Europe invited Russian authorities, in connection with the Kirovles case, "to use urgently further avenues to erase the prohibition on Mr. Navalny's standing for election".

Navalny was sentenced to 20 days in jail on 2 October 2017 for calls to participate in protests without approval from state authorities.

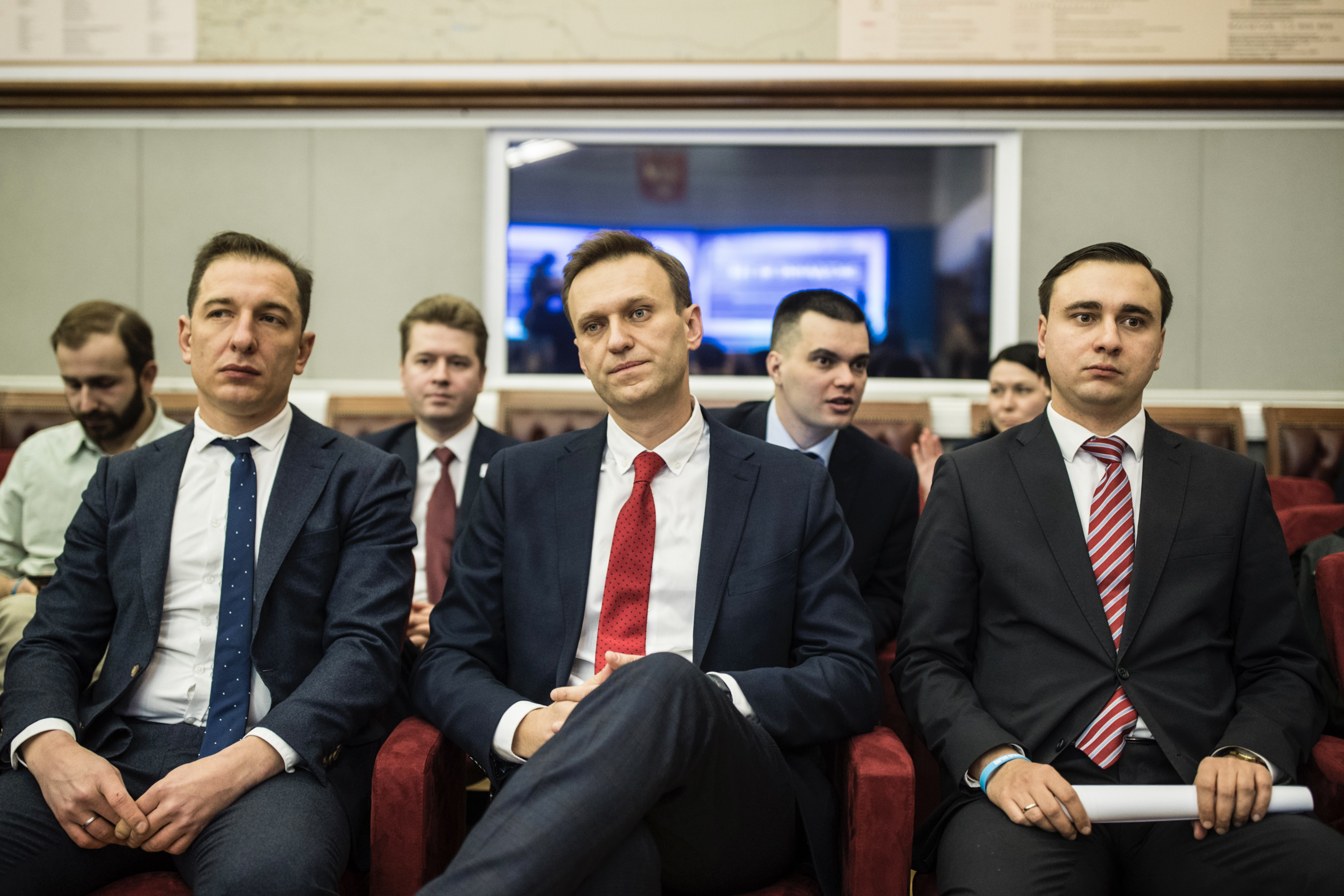
Roman Rubanov, Navalny and Ivan Zhdanov at a meeting of the Central Election Commission in December 2017

In December 2017, Russia's Central Electoral Commission barred Navalny from running for president in 2018, citing Navalny's corruption conviction. The European Union said Navalny's removal cast "serious doubt" on the election. Navalny called for a boycott of the 2018 presidential election, stating his removal meant that millions of Russians were being denied their vote. Navalny filed an appeal against the Russian Supreme Court's ruling on 3 January, however a few days later on 6 January, the Supreme Court of Russia rejected his appeal.

Navalny led protests on 28 January 2018 to urge a boycott of the presidential election. Navalny was arrested on the day of the protest and then released the same day, pending trial. OVD-Info reported that 257 people were arrested throughout the country. According to Russian news reports, police stated Navalny was likely to be charged with calling for unauthorised demonstrations. Two of Navalny's associates were given brief jail terms for urging people to attend unsanctioned opposition rallies. Navalny stated on 5 February 2018 the government was accusing Navalny of assaulting an officer during the protests. Navalny was among 1600 people detained during 5 May protests prior to Putin's inauguration; Navalny was charged with disobeying police. On 15 May, he was sentenced to 30 days in jail. Immediately after his release on 25 September 2018, he was arrested and convicted for organising illegal demonstrations and sentenced to another 20 days in jail.

=== 2019 Moscow City Duma elections ===
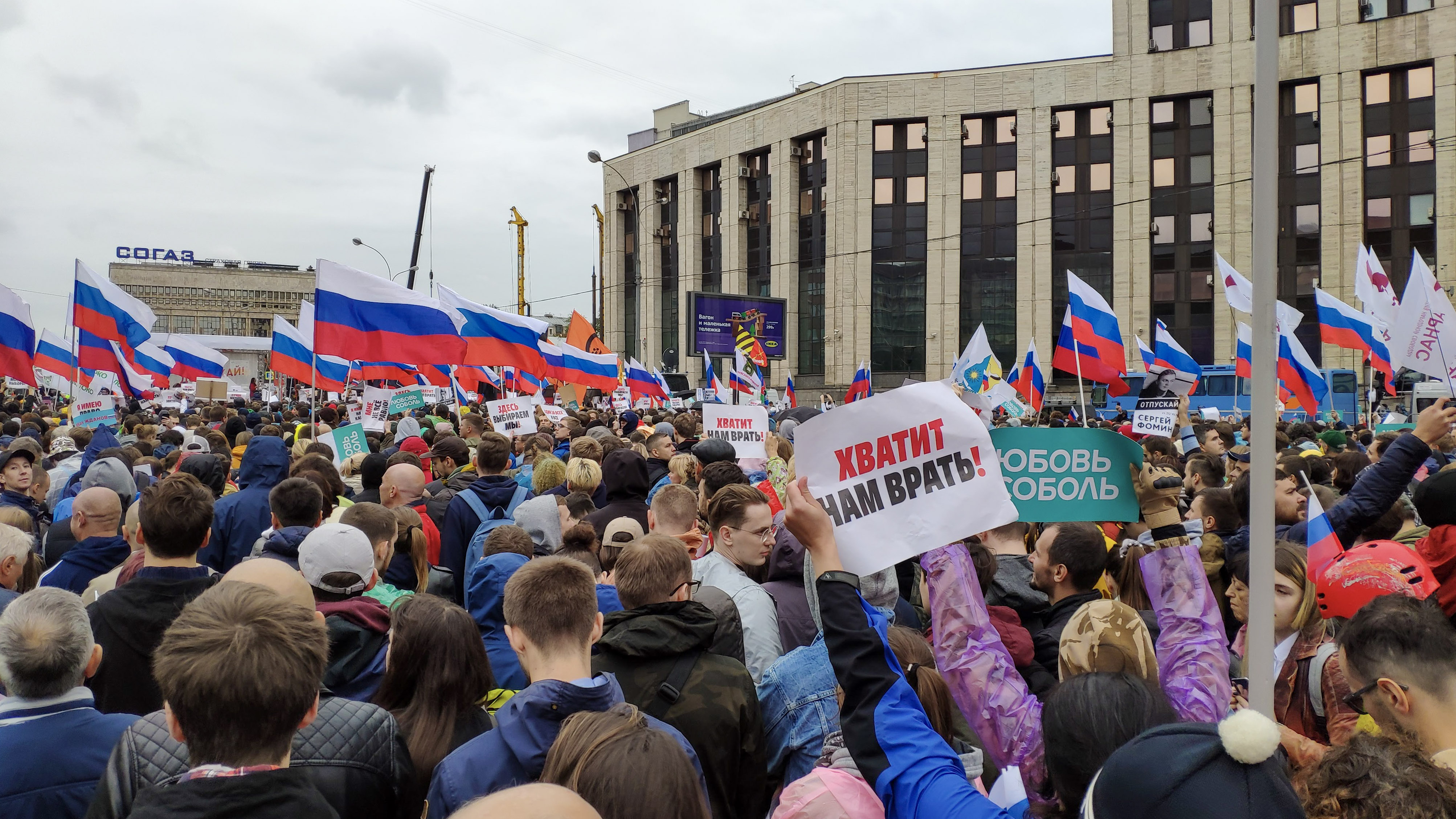
Rally for right to vote in Moscow (10 August 2019)

During the 2019 Moscow City Duma election Navalny supported independent candidates, most of whom were not allowed to participate in the elections, which led to mass street protests. In July 2019, Navalny was arrested, first for ten days, and then, almost immediately, for 30 days. On the evening of 28 July, he was hospitalised with severe damage to his eyes and skin. At the hospital, he was diagnosed with an "allergy," although this diagnosis was disputed by Anastasia Vasilyeva, an ophthalmologist who previously treated Navalny after a chemical attack by an alleged protester in 2017. Vasilyeva questioned the diagnosis and suggested the possibility that Navalny's condition was the result of "the damaging effects of undetermined chemicals". On 29 July 2019, Navalny was discharged from hospital and taken back to prison, despite the objections of his personal physician who questioned the hospital's motives. Supporters of Navalny and journalists near the hospital were attacked by the police and many were detained. In response, he initiated the Smart Voting project.

=== 2020 constitutional referendum ===
Navalny campaigned against the vote on constitutional amendments that took place on 1 July, calling it a "coup" and a "violation of the constitution". He also said that the changes would allow President Putin to become "president for life". After the results were announced, he called them a "big lie" that did not reflect public opinion. The reforms include an amendment allowing Putin to serve another two terms in office (until 2036), after his fourth presidential term ends.

== Anti-corruption investigations ==
In 2008, Navalny sought to become an activist shareholder in five Russian oil and gas companies (Rosneft, Gazprom, Gazprom Neft, Lukoil, and Surgutneftegas), investing 300,000 rubles with the ultimate goal of increasing the transparency of their financial assets. Such transparency is required by law, but there are allegations that high-level managers of these companies are involved in theft and resisting transparency.

In November 2010, Navalny published confidential documents about Transneft's auditing. According to Navalny's blog, about US$4 billion were stolen by Transneft's leaders during the construction of the Eastern Siberia–Pacific Ocean oil pipeline. In December, Navalny announced the launch of the RosPil project, which seeks to bring to light corrupt practices in the government procurement process. The project takes advantage of existing procurement regulation that requires all government requests for tender to be posted online. Information about winning bids must be posted online as well. The name RosPil is a pun on the slang term "распил" (literally "sawing"), implying the embezzlement of state funds.

In May 2011, Navalny launched RosYama (literally "Russian Hole"), a project that allowed individuals to report potholes and track government responses to complaints. In August, Navalny published papers related to a scandalous real estate deal between the Hungarian and Russian governments. According to the papers, Hungary sold a former embassy building in Moscow for US$21 million to an offshore company of Viktor Vekselberg, who immediately resold it to the Russian government for US$116 million. The property's real value was estimated at US$52 million. Irregularities in the paper trail implied collusion. Three Hungarian officials responsible for the deal were detained in February 2011.

Navalny was founder of the Anti-Corruption Foundation (FBK).

In February 2012, Navalny concluded that Russian federal money going to Ramzan Kadyrov's Chechen Interior Ministry was being spent "in a totally shadowy and fraudulent way." In May, Navalny accused Deputy Prime Minister Igor Shuvalov of corruption, stating that companies owned by Roman Abramovich and Alisher Usmanov had transferred tens of millions of dollars to Shuvalov's company, allowing Shuvalov to share in the profit from Usmanov's purchase of the British steel company Corus. Navalny posted scans of documents to his blog showing the money transfers. Usmanov and Shuvalov stated the documents Navalny had posted were legitimate, but that the transaction had not violated Russian law. "I unswervingly followed the rules and principles of conflict of interest," said Shuvalov. "For a lawyer, this is sacred". In July, Navalny posted documents on his blog allegedly showing that Alexander Bastrykin, head of the Investigative Committee of Russia, owned an undeclared business in the Czech Republic. The posting was described by the Financial Times as Navalny's "answering shot" for having had his emails leaked during his arrest in the previous month.

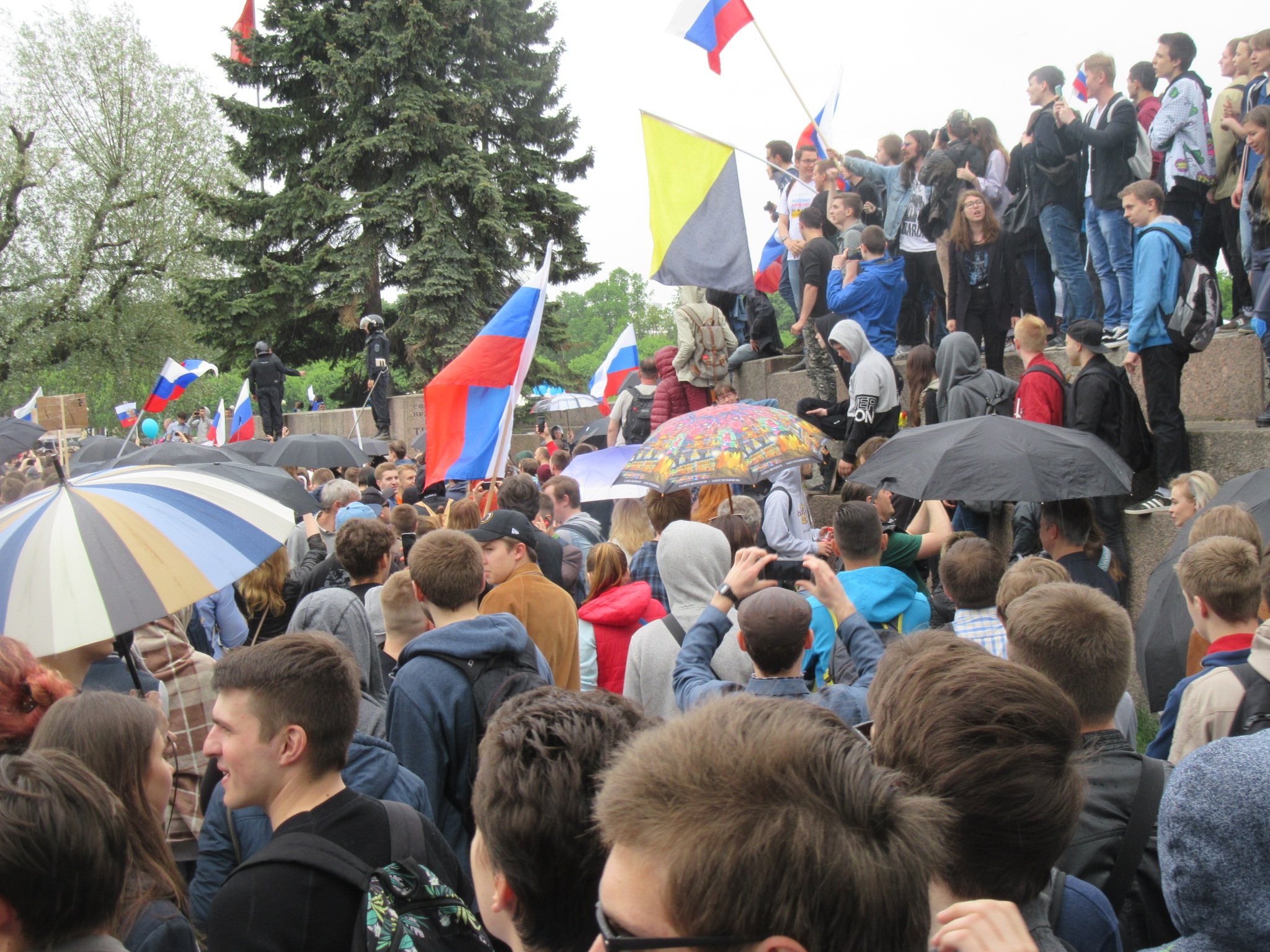
The Levada Center survey showed that 58% of surveyed Russians supported the 2017 Russian protests against government corruption.

In August 2018, Navalny alleged that Viktor Zolotov stole at least US$29 million from procurement contracts for the National Guard of Russia. Shortly after his allegations against Zolotov, Navalny was imprisoned for staging protests in January 2018. Subsequently, Viktor Zolotov published a video message on 11 September challenging Navalny to a duel and promising to make "good, juicy mincemeat" of him.

=== Medvedev ===
In March 2017, Navalny published the investigation He Is Not Dimon to You, accusing Prime Minister Dmitry Medvedev of corruption. The authorities either ignored the accusation or argued that it was made by a "convicted criminal" and not worth comment. On 26 March, Navalny organised a series of anti-corruption rallies in cities across Russia. In some cities, the rallies were sanctioned by authorities, but in others, including Moscow and Saint Petersburg, they were not allowed. The Moscow police said that 500 people had been detained, but according to the human-rights group OVD-Info, 1,030 people were detained in Moscow alone, including Navalny himself. On 27 March, he was fined 20,000 rubles minimum for organising an illegal protest, and jailed for 15 days for resisting arrest.

=== Putin ===
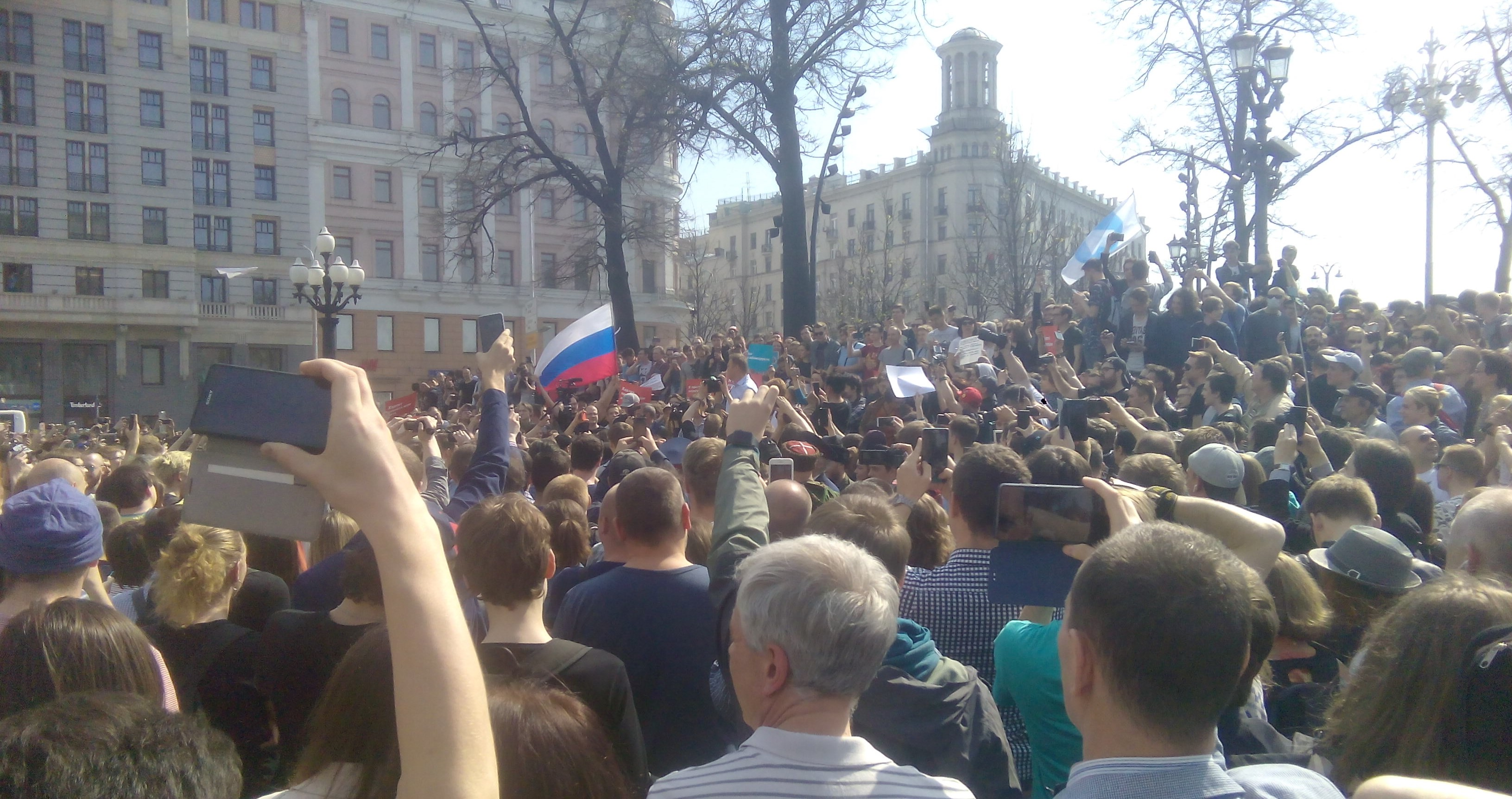
Navalny and his team organised around 90 "He's Not Our Tsar" protests across Russia in May 2018.

On 19 January 2021, two days after he was detained by Russian authorities upon his return to Russia, an investigation by Navalny and the FBK was published accusing President Vladimir Putin of using fraudulently obtained funds to build a massive estate for himself near the town of Gelendzhik in Krasnodar Krai, in what he called "the world's biggest bribe". The estate was first reported on in 2010 after the businessman Sergei Kolesnikov, who was involved in the project, gave details about it. According to Navalny, the estate is 39 times the size of Monaco, with the Federal Security Service (FSB) owning 70 square kilometers of land around the palace, and the estate cost over 100 billion rubles ($1.35 billion) to construct. It also showed aerial footage of the estate via a drone, and a detailed floor plan of the palace that Navalny and the FBK said was given by a contractor, which was compared to photographs from inside the palace that were leaked onto the Internet in 2011. Using the floorplan, computer-generated visualisations of the palace interior were also shown.

There are impregnable fences, its own port, its own security, a church, its own permit system, a no-fly zone, and even its own border checkpoint. It is absolutely a separate state within Russia.

— Alexei Anatolievich Navalny

This investigation also detailed an elaborate corruption scheme allegedly involving Putin's inner circle that allowed Putin to hide billions of dollars to build the estate. Navalny's team also said that it managed to confirm reporting about Putin's alleged lovers Svetlana Krivonogikh and Alina Kabaeva. Navalny's video on YouTube garnered over 20 million views in less than a day, and over 92 million after a week. Kremlin spokesman Dmitry Peskov in a press conference called the investigation a "scam" and said that citizens should "think before transferring money to such crooks".

Putin denied ownership of the palace and the oligarch Arkady Rotenberg, Putin's childhood friend and judo partner, claimed ownership.

== Criminal cases ==
=== Kirovles case ===
==== Case ====
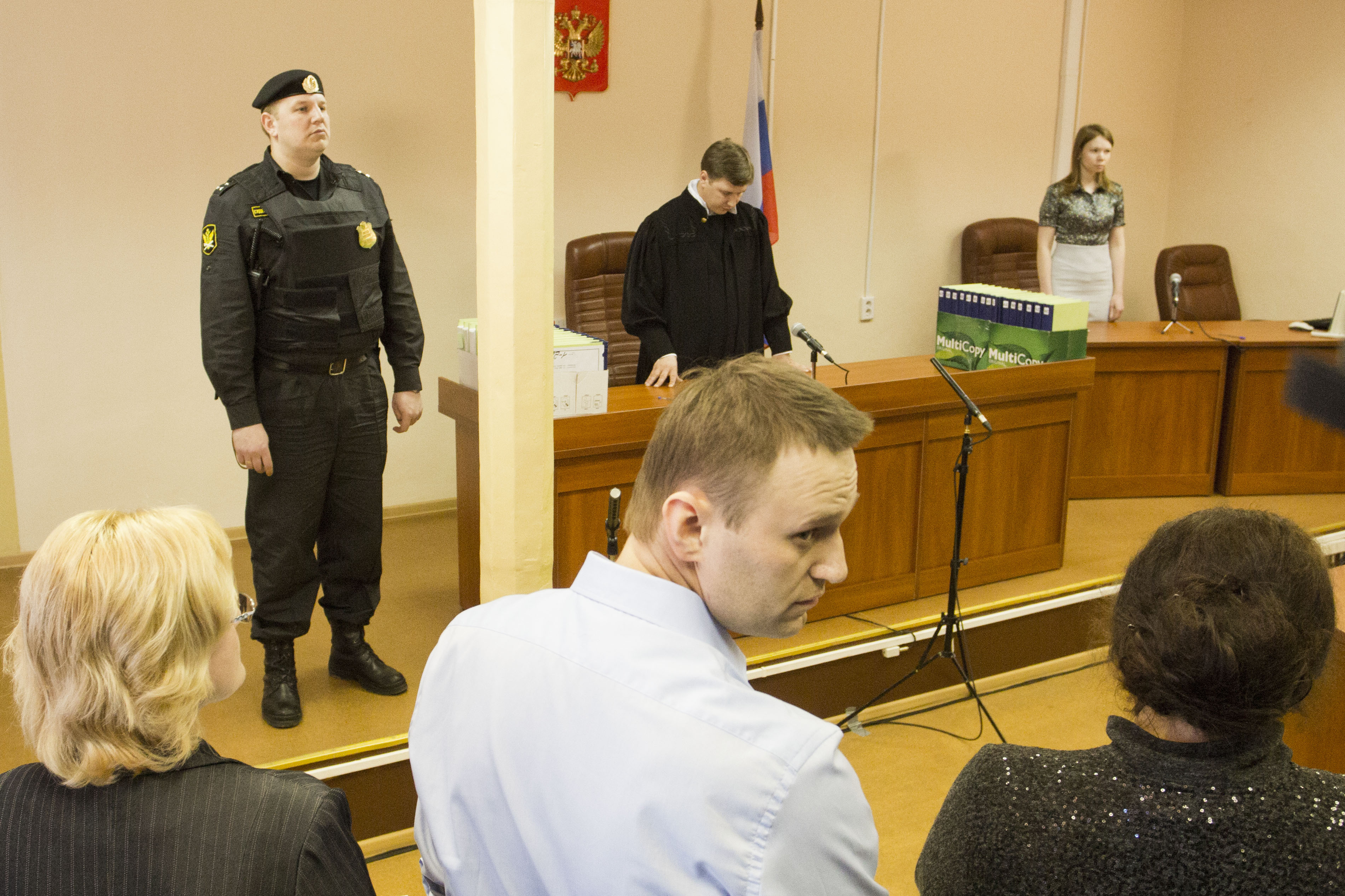
Navalny in court as part of the Kirovles trial, 2013

On 30 July 2012, the Investigative Committee charged Navalny with embezzlement. The committee stated that he had conspired to steal timber from Kirovles, a state-owned company in Kirov Oblast, in 2009, while acting as an adviser to Kirov's governor Nikita Belykh. Investigators had closed a previous probe into the claims for lack of evidence. Navalny was released on his own recognisance but instructed not to leave Moscow.

Navalny described the charges as "weird" and unfounded. He stated that authorities "are doing it to watch the reaction of the protest movement and of Western public opinion ... So far they consider both of these things acceptable and so they are continuing along this line". His supporters protested before the Investigative Committee offices.

Despite the mounting legal pressure, which Navalny described as 'political revenge for his investigations and work at the Anti-Corruption Foundation, as well as revenge for the campaign during the election period', he remained actively engaged in opposition activities. He took part in an antigovernmental protest in Moscow, undeterred by the ongoing proceedings against him. During this time, he also met with Kazakh theatre director and opposition figure Bolat Atabaev, who was visiting Moscow. The two discussed their respective political experiences and shared strategies for confronting corruption in authoritarian systems.

In April 2013, Loeb & Loeb LLP (Note: Loeb & Loeb LLP, founded by Joseph P. Loeb et al.. LLP stands for Limited liability partnership.) issued "An Analysis of the Russian Federation's prosecutions of Alexei Navalny", a paper detailing Investigative Committee accusations. The paper concludes that "the Kremlin has reverted to misuse of the Russian legal system to harass, isolate and attempt to silence political opponents".

==== Conviction and release ====
The Kirovles trial commenced in the city of Kirov on 17 April 2013. On 18 July, Navalny was sentenced to five years in jail for embezzlement. He was found guilty of misappropriating about 16 million rubles ($500,000) worth of lumber from a state-owned company. The sentence read by the judge Sergey Blinov was textually the same as the request of the prosecutor, with the only exception that Navalny was given five years, and the prosecution requested six years.

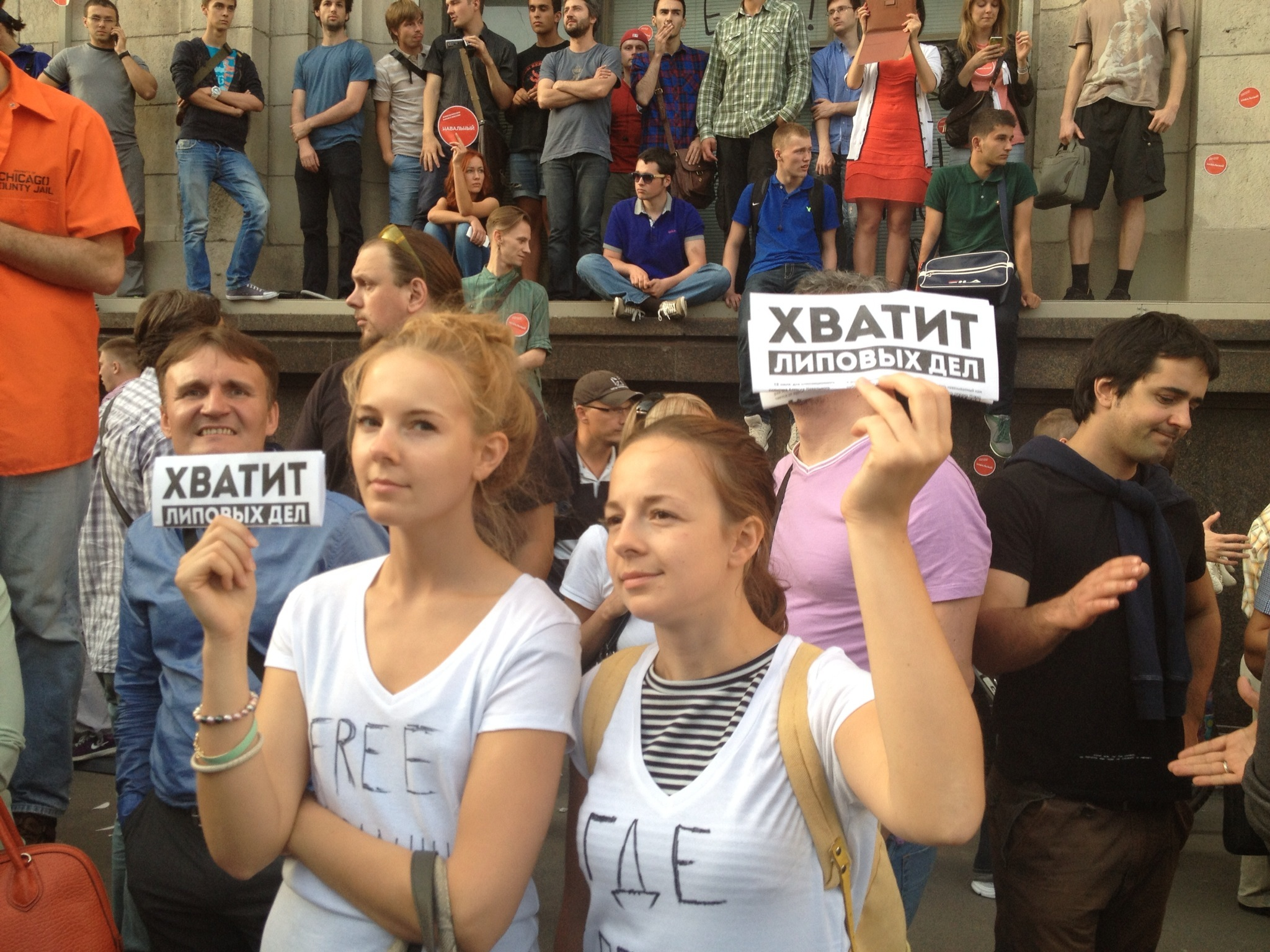
"Enough of fake cases". The protest against the verdict in Moscow, 18 July 2013

Later that evening, the Prosecutor's Office appealed Navalny and Ofitserov jail sentences, arguing that until the higher court affirmed the sentence, the sentence was invalid. The next morning, the appeal was granted. Navalny and Ofitserov were released on 19 July, awaiting the hearings of the higher court. The prosecutor's requested decision was described as "unprecedented" by experts.

==== Probation ====
The prison sentence was suspended by a court in Kirov on 16 October 2013, still being a burden for his political future.

==== Review of the sentence ====
On 23 February 2016, the European Court of Human Rights ruled that Russia had violated Navalny's right to a fair trial, and ordered the government to pay him 56,000 euros in legal costs and damages.

On 16 November 2016, Russia's Supreme Court overturned the 2013 sentence, sending the verdict back to the Leninsky District Court in Kirov for review.

On 8 February 2017, the Leninsky district court of Kirov repeated its sentence of 2013 and charged Navalny with a five-year suspended sentence. Navalny announced that he would pursue the annulment of the sentence that clearly contradicts the decision of ECHR.

=== Yves Rocher case and house arrest ===
==== Case ====
In 2008, Oleg Navalny made an offer to Yves Rocher Vostok, the Eastern European subsidiary of Yves Rocher between 2008 and 2012, to accredit Glavpodpiska, which was created by Navalny, with delivering duties. On 5 August, the parties signed a contract. To fulfill the obligations under the agreement, Glavpodpiska outsourced the task to sub-suppliers, AvtoSAGA and Multiprofile Processing Company (MPC). In November and December 2012, the Investigating Committee interrogated and questioned Yves Rocher Vostok. On 10 December, Bruno Leproux, general director of Yves Rocher Vostok, filed to the Investigative Committee, asking to investigate if the Glavpodpiska subscription company had damaged Yves Rocher Vostok, and the Investigative Committee initiated a case.

The prosecution claimed Glavpodpiska embezzled money by taking duties and then redistributing them to other companies for lesser amounts of money, and collecting the surplus: 26.7 million rubles ($540,000) from Yves Rocher Vostok, and 4.4 million rubles from the MPC. The funds were claimed to be subsequently legalised by transferring them on fictitious grounds from a fly-by-night company to Kobyakovskaya Fabrika Po Lozopleteniyu, a willow weaving company founded by Navalny and operated by his parents. The Navalnys denied the charges. The Navalny brothers' lawyers claimed the investigators "added phrases like 'bearing criminal intentions' to a description of regular entrepreneurial activity". According to Oleg Navalny's lawyer, Glavpodpiska did not just collect money, it controlled provision of means of transport, execution of orders, collected and expedited production to the carriers, and was responsible before clients for terms and quality of executing orders.

None of the witnesses confirmed that there were any losses, except MPC CEO Sergei Shustov who said he had learned about his losses from an investigator and believed him without making audits. Both brothers and their lawyers claimed Alexei Navalny did not participate in the Glavpodpiska operations, and witnesses all stated they had never encountered Alexei Navalny in person before the trial.

==== House arrest and limitations ====
Following the imputed violation of travel restrictions, Navalny was placed under house arrest and prohibited from communicating with anyone other than his family, lawyers, and investigators on 28 February 2014. Navalny claimed the arrest was politically motivated, and he filed a complaint to the European Court of Human Rights. On 7 July, he declared the complaint had been accepted and given priority; the court compelled the Government of Russia to provide answers to a questionnaire.

The house arrest, in particular, prohibited usage of the internet; however, new posts were released under his social media accounts after the arrest was announced. A 5 March post claimed the accounts were controlled by his Anti-Corruption Foundation teammates and his wife Yulia. On 13 March, his LiveJournal blog was blocked in Russia, because, according to the Federal Service for Supervision of Communications, Information Technology, and Mass Media (Roskomnadzor), "functioning of the given web page breaks the regulation of the juridical decision of the bail hearing of a citizen against whom a criminal case has been initiated".

The house arrest was eased a number of times: On 21 August, Navalny was allowed to communicate with his co-defendants; a journalist present in the courthouse at the moment confirmed Navalny was allowed to communicate with "anyone but the Yves Rocher case witnesses". On 10 October, his right to communicate with the press was confirmed by another court, and he was allowed to make comments on the case in media (Navalny's plea not to prolong the arrest was, however, rejected). On 19 December, he was allowed to mail correspondence to authorities and international courts. Navalny again pleaded not to prolong the arrest, but the plea was rejected again.

==== Conviction ====
The verdict was announced on 30 December 2014. Both brothers were found guilty of fraud against Multiprofile Processing Company (MPC) and Yves Rocher Vostok and money laundering, and were convicted under Articles 159.4 §§ 2 and 3 and 174.1 § 2 (a) and (b) of the Criminal Code. Alexei Navalny was given 3 1/2 years of suspended sentence, and Oleg Navalny was sentenced to 3 1/2 years in prison and was arrested after the verdict was announced; both had to pay a fine of 500,000 rubles and a compensation to the MPC of over 4 million rubles. In the evening, several thousand protesters gathered in the center of Moscow. Navalny broke his house arrest to attend the rally and was immediately apprehended by the police and brought back home.

Both brothers filed complaints to the European Court of Human Rights: Oleg's was communicated and given priority; Alexei's was reviewed in the context of the previous complaint related to this case and the Government of Russia had been "invited to submit further observations". The second instance within the country confirmed the verdict, only releasing Alexei from the responsibility to pay his fine. Both prosecutors and defendants were not satisfied with this decision.

==== ECHR ====
On 17 October 2017, the European Court of Human Rights ruled that Navalny's conviction for fraud and money laundering "was based on an unforeseeable application of criminal law and that the proceedings were arbitrary and unfair". The Court found that the domestic court's decisions had been arbitrary and manifestly unreasonable. ECHR found the Russian courts' decisions violated articles 6 and 7 of the European Convention on Human Rights. On 15 November 2018, the Grand Chamber upheld the decision.

=== Indemnification ===
After the Yves Rocher case, Navalny had to pay a compensation of 4.4 million rubles. He declared the case was "a frame up", but he added he would pay the sum as this could affect granting his brother's parole. On 7 October 2015, Alexei's lawyer announced the defendant willingly paid 2.9 million and requested an installment plan for the rest of the sum. The request was granted, except the term was contracted from the requested five months to two, and a part of the sum declared paid (900,000 rubles; arrested from Navalny's banking account) was not yet received by the police; the prosecutors declared that may happen because of inter-process delays.

Later that month, Kirovles sued Navalny for the 16.1 million rubles declared pecuniary injury; Navalny declared he had not expected the suit, as Kirovles did not initiate it during the 2012–2013 trial. On 23 October, a court resolved the said sum should be paid by the three defendants. The court denied the defendants' motion 14.7 million had already been paid by that point; the verdict and the payment sum were justified by a ruling by a Plenum of the Supreme Court of the Russian Federation. Navalny declared he could not cover the requested sum; he called the suit a "drain-dry strategy" by authorities.

=== Other cases ===
In late December 2012, the Investigative Committee of Russia asserted that Allekt, an advertising company headed by Navalny, defrauded the Union of Right Forces (SPS) political party in 2007 by taking 100 million rubles ($3.2 million) payment for advertising and failing to honor its contract. If charged and convicted, Navalny could be jailed for up to 10 years. Leonid Gozman, a former SPS official, was quoted as saying: "Nothing of the sort happened—he committed no robbery". Earlier in December, as reported by the BBC, "the Investigative Committee charged [...] Navalny and his brother Oleg with embezzling 55 million rubles ($1.76 million) in 2008–2011 while working in a postal business". Navalny, who denied the allegations in the two previous cases, sought to laugh off news of the third inquiry with a tweet stating "Fiddlesticks". In April 2020, Yandex search engine started artificially placing negative commentary about Navalny on the top positions in its search results for his name. Yandex declared this was part of an "experiment" and returned to presenting organic search results.

Navalny alleged that Russian billionaire and businessman Yevgeny Prigozhin was linked to a company called Moskovsky Shkolnik (Moscow schoolboy) that had supplied poor quality food to schools which had caused a dysentery outbreak. In April 2019, Moskovsky Shkolnik filed a lawsuit against Navalny. In October 2019, the Moscow Arbitration Court ordered Navalny to pay 29.2 million rubles. Navalny said that "Cases of dysentery were proven using documents. But it's us that has to pay." By April 2019, Navalny had won six complaints against Russian authorities in the ECHR for a total of €225,000. Prigozhin was quoted by the press service of his catering company Concord Management and Consulting on 25 August 2020 as saying that he intended to enforce a court decision that required Navalny, his associate Lyubov Sobol and his Anti-Corruption Foundation to pay 88 million rubles in damages to the Moskovsky Shkolnik company over a video investigation.

== Poisoning and recovery ==
On 20 August 2020, Navalny fell ill during a flight from Tomsk to Moscow and was hospitalised in the Emergency City Clinical Hospital No. 1 in Omsk (Городская клиническая больница скорой медицинской помощи №1), where the plane had made an emergency landing. The change in his condition on the plane was sudden and violent, and video footage showed crewmembers on the flight scurrying towards him as he screamed loudly. Later, he said that he was not screaming from pain, but from the knowledge that he was dying.

Navalny's spokeswoman, Kira Yarmysh, later said that he was in a coma and on a ventilator in the Omsk hospital. She also said that since he arose that morning, Navalny had consumed nothing but a cup of tea, acquired at the airport. It was initially suspected that something was mixed into his drink, and physicians stated that a "toxin mixed into a hot drink would be rapidly absorbed". The hospital said that he was in a stable but serious condition. Although staff initially acknowledged that Navalny had probably been poisoned, after numerous police personnel appeared outside Navalny's room, the medical staff was less forthcoming. The Omsk hospital's deputy chief physician later told reporters that poisoning was "one scenario among many" being considered.

A plane was sent from Germany to evacuate Navalny from Russia for treatment at the Charité Hospital in Berlin. Although the doctors treating him in Omsk initially declared he was too sick to be transported, they later released him. On 24 August, the doctors in Germany made an announcement, confirming that Navalny had been poisoned with a cholinesterase inhibitor.

Ivan Zhdanov, chief of Navalny's Anti-Corruption Foundation, said that Navalny could have been poisoned because of one of the foundation's investigations. On 2 September, the German government announced that Navalny was poisoned with a Novichok nerve agent, from the same family of nerve agents that was used to poison Sergei Skripal and his daughter. International officials said that they had obtained "unequivocal proof" from toxicology tests, and have called on the Russian government for an explanation. On 7 September, German doctors announced that he was out of the coma. On 15 September, Navalny's spokeswoman said that Navalny would return to Russia.

On 17 September, Navalny's team said that traces of the nerve agent used to poison Navalny was detected on an empty water bottle from his hotel room in Tomsk, suggesting that he was possibly poisoned before leaving the hotel. On 23 September, Navalny was discharged from hospital after his condition had sufficiently improved. On 6 October, OPCW confirmed presence of cholinesterase inhibitor from the Novichok group in Navalny's blood and urine samples.

On 14 December, a joint investigation by The Insider and Bellingcat in co-operation with CNN and Der Spiegel was published, which implicated agents from Russia's Federal Security Service (FSB) in Navalny's poisoning. The investigation detailed a special unit of the FSB, which specialises in chemical substances, and the investigators then tracked members of the unit, using telecom and travel data. According to the investigation, Navalny was under surveillance by a group of operatives from the unit for 3 years and there may have been earlier attempts to poison Navalny. In an interview with Spanish newspaper El País, Navalny said that "It is difficult for me to understand exactly what is going on in [Putin's] mind. ... 20 years of power would spoil anyone and make them crazy. He thinks he can do whatever he wants."

On 21 December 2020, Navalny released a video showing him impersonating a Russian security official and speaking over the phone with a man identified by some investigative news media as a chemical weapons expert named Konstantin Kudryavtsev. During the call, he revealed that the poison had been placed on Navalny's clothing, particularly in his underwear, and that Navalny would have died if not for the plane's emergency landing and quick response from an ambulance crew on the runway.

In January 2021, Bellingcat, The Insider and Der Spiegel linked the unit that tracked Navalny to other deaths, including activists Timur Kuashev in 2014 and Ruslan Magomedragimov in 2015, and politician Nikita Isayev in 2019. In February, another joint investigation found that Russian opposition politician Vladimir Kara-Murza was followed by the same unit before his suspected poisonings.

The European Union, United Kingdom and United States responded to the poisoning by imposing sanctions on senior Russian officials.

== Imprisonment ==
=== Yves Rocher case ===
Approximate aircraft route of flight DP936 taken by Alexei Navalny, on 17 January 2021, showing its deviation

On 17 January 2021, Navalny flew from Germany to Russia on Pobeda airlines flight DP936. The flight was scheduled to land at Moscow's Vnukovo Airport, but was diverted mid-flight to Sheremetyevo International Airport. At passport control, he was detained. The Federal Penitentiary Service (FSIN) confirmed his detention and said that he would remain in custody until the court hearing. Prior to his return, the FSIN had said that Navalny might face jail time upon his arrival in Moscow for violating the terms of his probation by leaving Russia, saying it would be "obliged" to detain him once he returned; in 2014, Navalny received a suspended sentence in the Yves Rocher case, which he called politically motivated and in 2017, the European Court of Human Rights ruled that Navalny was unfairly convicted. Amnesty International declared Navalny to be a prisoner of conscience and called on the Russian authorities to release him. In February 2021, Amnesty briefly revoked the designation after it said it was being "bombarded" with complaints about xenophobic comments made by Navalny in the past; however, they reversed this decision in May of the same year, with a statement that noted that designation of "an individual as Prisoner of Conscience [...] in no way involves or implies the endorsement of their views" and that the primary purpose of such a designation was to "highlight [...] the urgent need for his rights [...] to be recognised and acted upon by the Russian authorities".

A court decision on 18 January 2021 ordered the detention of Navalny until 15 February for violating his parole. A makeshift court was set up in the police station where Navalny was being held. Another hearing would later be held to determine whether his suspended sentence should be replaced with a jail term. Navalny described the procedure as "ultimate lawlessness" and called on his supporters to take to the streets. The next day, while in jail, an investigation by Navalny and the FBK was published accusing President Vladimir Putin of corruption. The investigation and his arrest led to mass protests across Russia beginning on 23 January 2021.

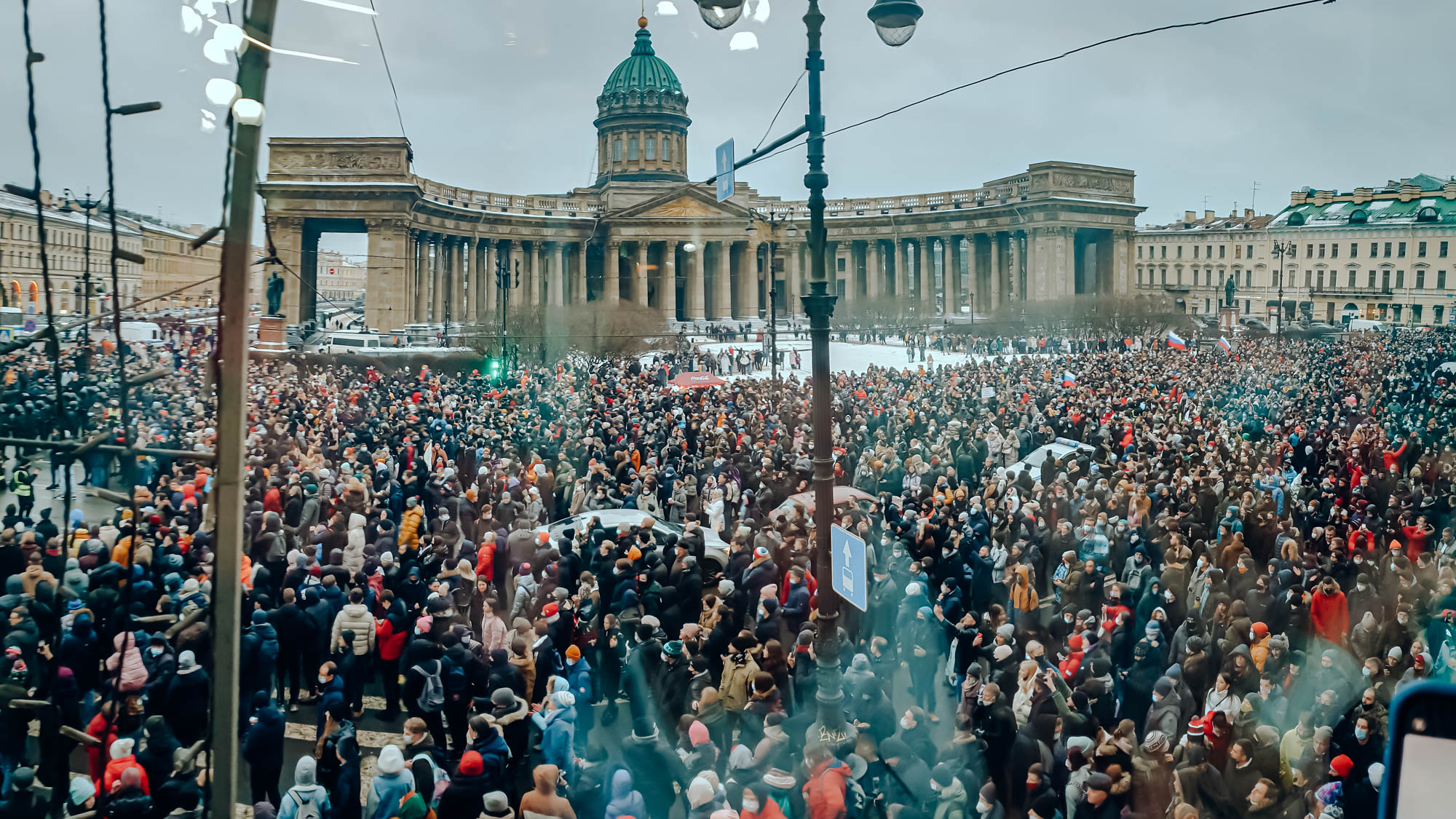
Protest in support of Navalny in St. Petersburg, 23 January 2021

A Moscow court on 2 February 2021 replaced Navalny's three-and-a-half-year suspended sentence with a prison sentence, minus the amount of time he spent under house arrest, meaning he would spend two years and eight months in a corrective labour colony. The verdict was condemned by the governments of the United States, United Kingdom, Germany, France and others as well as the EU. Immediately after the verdict was announced, protests in a number of Russian cities were held and met with a harsh police crackdown. Navalny later returned to court for a trial on slander charges, where he was accused of defaming a World War II veteran who took part in a promotional video backing the constitutional amendments last year. The case was launched in June 2020 after Navalny called those who took part in the video "corrupt lackeys" and "traitors". Navalny called the case politically motivated and accused authorities of using the case to smear his reputation. Although the charge is punishable by up to two years in prison if proven, his lawyer said that Navalny cannot face a custodial sentence because the law was changed to make it a jailable offence after the alleged crime had taken place.

The European Court of Human Rights ruled on 16 February 2021 that the Russian government should release Navalny immediately, saying that the resolution was made in "regard to the nature and extent of risk to the applicant's life". Navalny's lawyers had applied to the court for an "interim measure" for his release on 20 January 2021 after his detention. However Russian officials indicated that they would not comply with the decision. Justice Minister Konstantin Chuychenko called the measure a "flagrant intervention in the operation of a judicial system of a sovereign state" as well as "unreasonable and unlawful", claiming that it did not "contain any reference to any fact or any norm of the law, which would have allowed the court to take this decision". In December 2020, a series of laws were also passed and signed that gave the constitution precedence over rulings made by international bodies as well international treaties. A few days later, a Moscow court rejected Navalny's appeal and upheld his prison sentence; however, it reduced his sentence by six weeks after deciding to count his time under house arrest as part of his time served. Another court convicted Navalny on slander charges against the World War II veteran, fining him 850,000 rubles ($11,541).

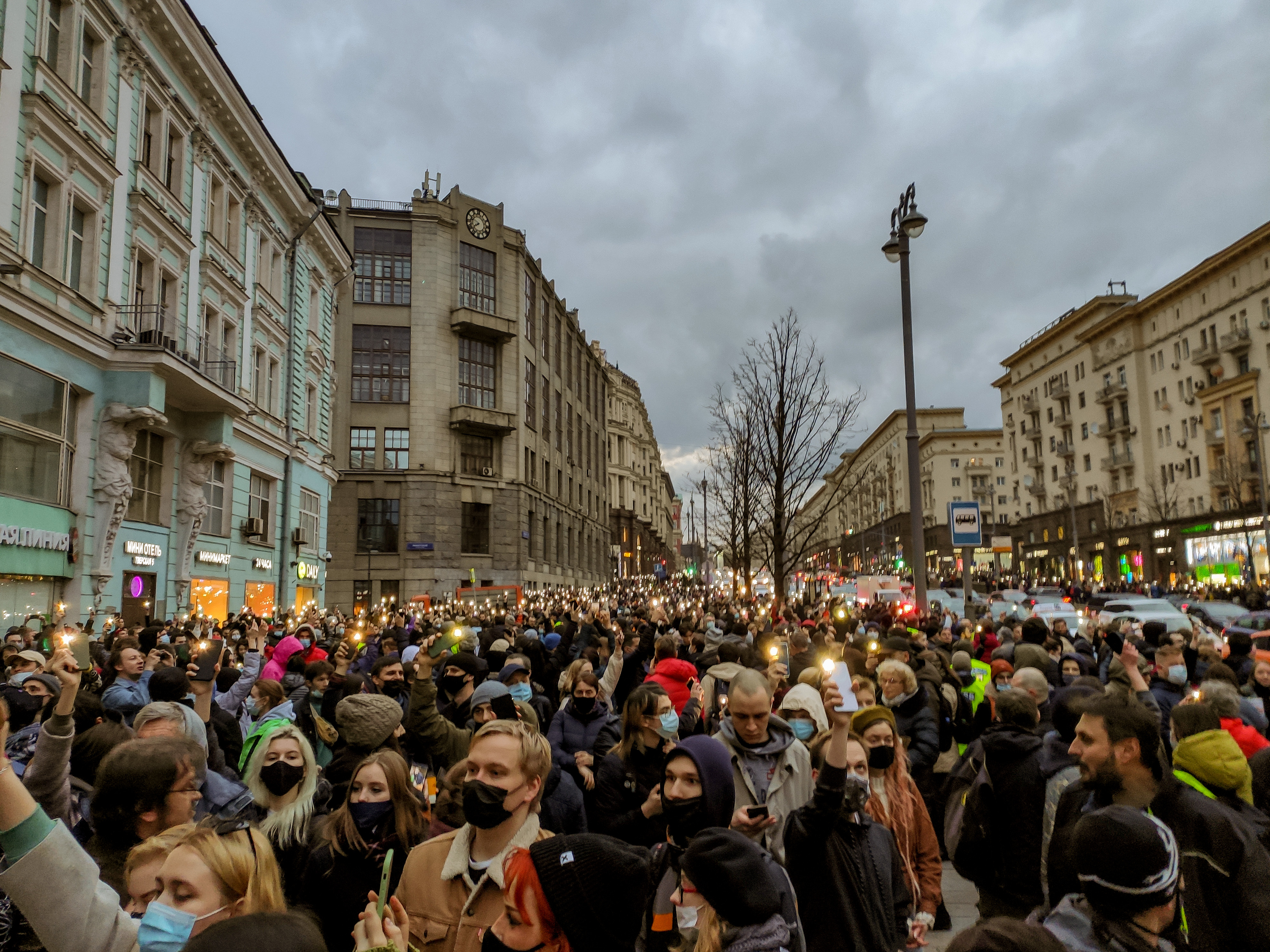
Protest in support of Navalny in Moscow, 21 April 2021

A resolution by the ECHR called for his release.

Navalny was reported on 28 February 2021 to have recently arrived at the Pokrov correctional colony in Vladimir Oblast, a prison where Dmitry Demushkin and Konstantin Kotov were also jailed. In early March 2021, the European Union and United States imposed sanctions on senior Russian officials in response to Navalny's poisoning and imprisonment.

In March 2021, Navalny in a formal complaint accused authorities of torture by depriving him of sleep, where authorities consider him a flight risk. Navalny told lawyers that guards wake him up eight times a night announcing to a camera that he was in his prison cell. A lawyer of Navalny said that he was suffering from health problems, including a loss of sensation in his spine and legs, and that prison authorities denied Navalny's requests for a civilian physician, claiming his health was "satisfactory". On 31 March 2021, Navalny announced a hunger strike to demand proper medical treatment. On 6 April 2021, six doctors, including Navalny's personal physician, Anastasia Vasilyeva, and two CNN correspondents, were arrested outside the prison when they attempted to visit Navalny whose health significantly deteriorated. On 7 April 2021, Navalny's attorneys claimed he had suffered two spinal disc herniations and had lost feeling in his hands, prompting criticism from the U.S. government. Agnès Callamard, Secretary General of Amnesty International accused Vladimir Putin of slowly killing Alexei Navalny through torture and inhumane treatment in prison. He also complained that he was not allowed to read newspapers or have any books including a copy of the Quran that he planned to study.

On 17 April 2021, it was reported that Navalny was in immediate need of medical attention. Navalny's personal doctor Anastasia Vasilyeva and three other doctors, including cardiologist Yaroslav Ashikhmin, asked prison officials to grant them immediate access, stating on social media that "our patient can die any minute", due to an increased risk of a fatal cardiac arrest or kidney failure "at any moment". Test results obtained by Navalny's lawyers showed heightened levels of potassium in the blood, which can bring on cardiac arrest, and sharply elevated creatinine levels, indicating impaired kidneys. Navalny's results showed blood potassium levels of 7.1 mmol (millimoles) per liter; blood potassium levels higher than 6.0 mmol per liter usually require immediate treatment. Later that night, an open letter, addressed to Putin and open for Russian citizens to sign, was signed and published by 11 politicians representing several regional parliaments, demanding an independent doctor be allowed to visit Navalny, and for a review and cancellation of all of his criminal cases. "We regard what is happening in relation to Navalny as an attempt on the life of a politician, committed out of personal and political hatred," said the letter, "You, the President of the Russian Federation, personally bear responsibility for the life of Alexey Navalny on the territory of the Russian Federation, including in prison facilities – [you bear this responsibility] to Navalny himself, to his relatives, and to the whole world." Among the signatories were chairman of the Pskov Oblast branch of the Yabloko party, the deputy of the regional assembly Lev Schlossberg, the deputy from Karelia, the ex-chairman of Yabloko Emilia Slabunova, and the deputy of the Moscow City Duma Yevgeny Stupin.

The following day, his daughter called on Russian prison authorities to let her father be checked by doctors in a tweet written from Stanford University, where she is a student. Prominent celebrities such as J.K. Rowling and Jude Law also addressed a letter to Russian authorities asking to provide Navalny with proper medical treatment. U.S. president Joe Biden called his treatment "totally unfair" and National Security Advisor Jake Sullivan said that the Kremlin had been warned "that there will be consequences if Mr. Navalny dies." The European Union's head diplomat Josep Borrell stated that the organisation held the Russian government accountable for Navalny's health conditions. The president of the European Commission, Ursula von der Leyen, also expressed her concern for his health. However, Russian authorities rebuked such concerns by foreign countries. Kremlin spokesperson Dmitry Peskov said that Russian prison officials are monitoring Navalny's health, not the president.

On 19 April 2021, Navalny was moved from prison to a hospital for convicts, according to the Russian prison service, for "vitamin therapy". On 23 April 2021, Navalny announced that he was ending his hunger strike on advice of his doctors and as he felt his demands had been partially met. As of June 2021, his newspapers were still being censored as articles were cut out.

=== Designation as extremist ===
On 16 April 2021, the Moscow prosecutor office requested the Moscow City Court to designate organisations linked to Navalny including the Anti-Corruption Foundation and his headquarters as extremist organisations, claiming: "Under the disguise of liberal slogans, these organisations are engaged in creating conditions for the destabilisation of the social and socio-political situation." In response, Navalny aide Leonid Volkov stated: "Putin has just announced full-scale mass political repression in Russia."

On 26 April 2021, Moscow's prosecutor office ordered Navalny's network of regional offices, including those of the FBK, to cease its activities, pending a court ruling on whether to designate them as extremist organisations. Volkov explained that it will limit many of the group's activities as prosecutors seek to label the Foundation as "extremists". The move was condemned by Germany as well as Amnesty International, which, in a statement, said: "The objective is clear: to raze Alexei Navalny's movement to the ground while he languishes in prison."

On 29 April 2021, Navalny's team announced that the political network would be dissolved, in advance of a court ruling in May expected to designate it as extremist. According to Volkov, the headquarters would be transformed into independent political organisations "which will deal with investigations and elections, public campaigns and rallies". On the same day, his allies said that a new criminal case had been opened against Navalny, for allegedly setting up a non-profit organisation that infringed on the rights of citizens. The next day, the leader of Team 29, Ivan Pavlov, who also represents Navalny's team in the extremism case, was detained in Moscow.

On 30 April, the financial monitoring agency added Navalny's regional campaign offices to a list of "terrorists and extremists." On 20 May, the head of the Russian prison system and Navalny's ally Ivan Zhdanov reported that Navalny had "more or less" recovered and that his health was generally satisfactory. On 7 June, Navalny was returned to prison after fully recovering from the effects of the hunger strike.

On 9 June 2021, Navalny's political network, including his headquarters and the FBK, were designated as extremist organisations and liquidated by the Moscow City Court. Vyacheslav Polyga, judge of Moscow City Court, upheld the administrative claim of the prosecutor of Moscow city Denis Popov and, rejecting all the petitions of the defense, decided to recognise Anti-Corruption Foundation as extremist organisation, to liquidate it and to confiscate its assets; similar decision had been taken against the Citizens' Rights Protection Foundation; the activity of the Alexei Navalny staff was prohibited (case No.3а-1573/2021).

Case hearing was held in camera because, as indicated by advocate Ilia Novikov, the case file including the text of the administrative claim was classified as state secret. According to advocate Ivan Pavlov, Navalny was not a party to the proceedings and the judge refused to grant him that status; at the hearing, the prosecutor stated that defendants are extremist organisations because they want a change of power in Russia and have promised to assist protest participants by paying administrative and criminal fines, as well as filing complaints with the European Court of Human Rights. On 4 August 2021, First Court of Appeal of General Jurisdiction in Moscow upheld the decision of the court of first instance (case No.66а-3553/2021) and this decision entered into force that day.

On 28 December 2021, it was reported that the Anti-Corruption Foundation, the Citizens' Rights Protection Foundation and 18 individuals, including Alexei Navalny, filed a cassational appeal with the Second Court of Cassation of General Jurisdiction. On 25 March 2022, the Second Court of Cassation rejected all the appeals and upheld the judgements of the lower courts (case No.8а-5101/2022).

In October 2021, Navalny said that the Russian prison commission designated him as a "terrorist" and "extremist", but that he was no longer regarded as a flight risk. In January 2022, Russia added him and his aides to the "terrorists and extremists" list. On 28 June 2022, Navalny lost his appeal on being designated as "extremist" and "terrorist".

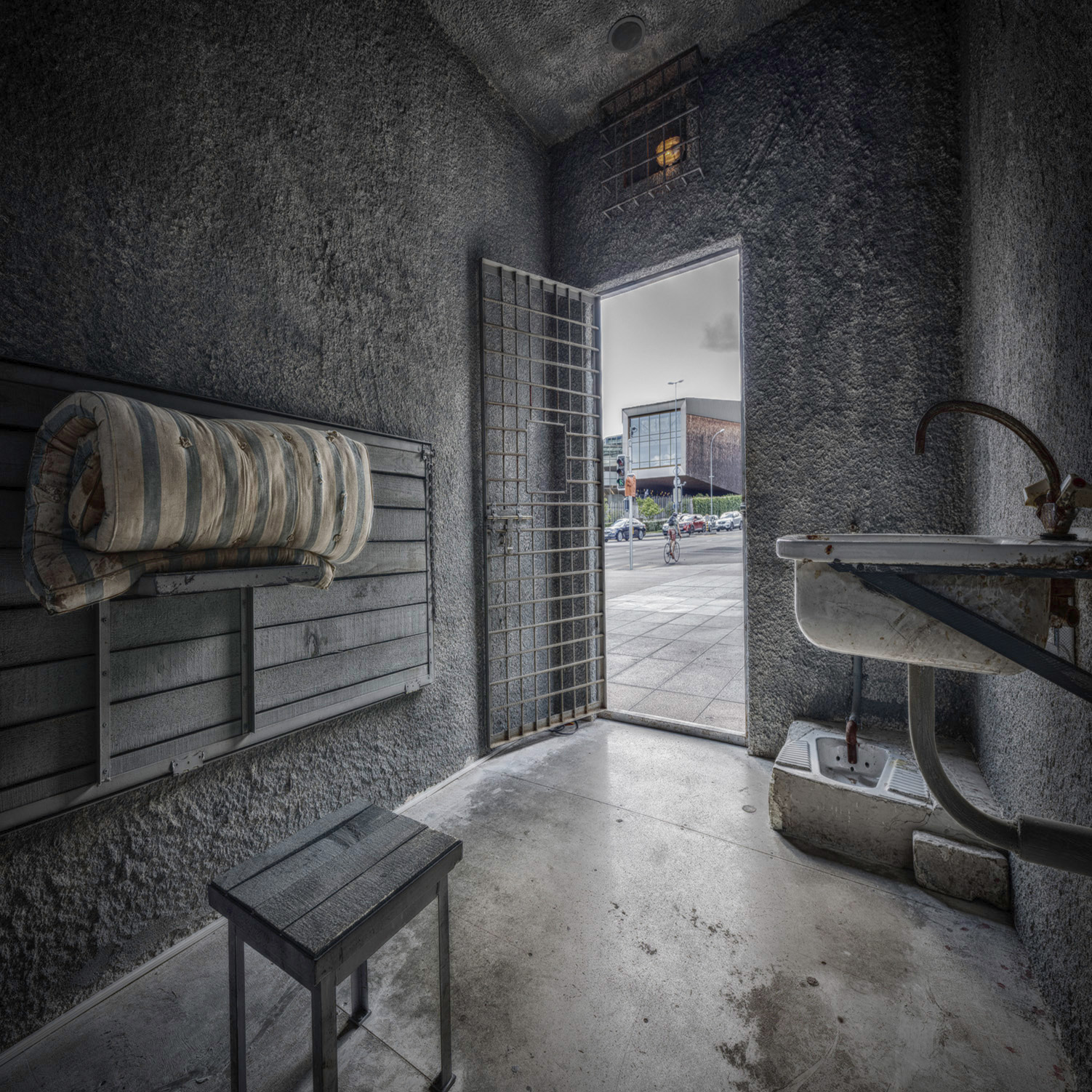
Interior of the replica solitary confinement cell for Navalny, called shizo in Geneva, June 2023

=== Later charges ===
In February 2022, Alexei Navalny faced an additional 10 to 15 years in prison in a new trial on fraud and contempt of court charges. The charges alleged that he stole $4.7m (£3.5m) of donations given to his political organisations and insulted a judge. He was tried in a makeshift courtroom in the corrective colony at which he was imprisoned. Amnesty International independently analysed the trial materials calling the charges "arbitrary" and "politically motivated".

On 21 February 2022, prosecution witness Fyodor Gorozhanko refused to testify against Navalny in the trial, stating that investigators had "pressured" him to testify to the information they wanted and that he did not believe Navalny had committed any crimes. On 24 February, during his trial, Navalny condemned the Russian invasion of Ukraine that began that day and asked the court to include his statement to the trial's protocol. He said that it would "lead to a huge number of victims, destroyed futures, and the continuation of this line of impoverishment of the citizens of Russia." He called the war a distraction to the population to "divert their attention from problems that exist inside the country".

On 22 March 2022, Navalny was found guilty of contempt of court and embezzlement and given a 9-year sentence in a maximum-security prison; he was also ordered to pay a fine of 1.2 million rubles (approx. $13,000). Amnesty International described the trial as a "sham".

On 17 May 2022, Navalny opened an appeal process against the sentence; the court said the process would resume on 24 May after Navalny requested to postpone the hearing to have a family meeting before being transferred. On 24 May, the Moscow City Court upheld the judgement of the court of first instance.

On 31 May 2022, Navalny said that he was officially notified about new charges of extremism brought against him, in which he was facing up to an additional 15 years in prison.

In mid-June 2022, Navalny was transferred to the maximum security prison IK-6 in Melekhovo, Vladimir Oblast.

On 11 July 2022, Navalny announced the relaunch of his Anti-Corruption Foundation as an international organisation with an advisory board including his wife Yulia Navalnaya, Guy Verhofstadt, Anne Applebaum, and Francis Fukuyama; Navalny also stated that the first contribution to Anti-Corruption Foundation International would be the Sakharov Prize ($50,000) that was awarded to him.

On 7 September 2022, Navalny said that he had been placed in solitary confinement for the fourth time in just over a month, immediately following his release. He attributed this treatment to his attempts to establish a labour union in his penal colony and his "6000" list of individuals he has called to be sanctioned. The next day, he said that his attorney-client privilege was revoked with prison authorities accusing him of continuing to commit crimes from prison.

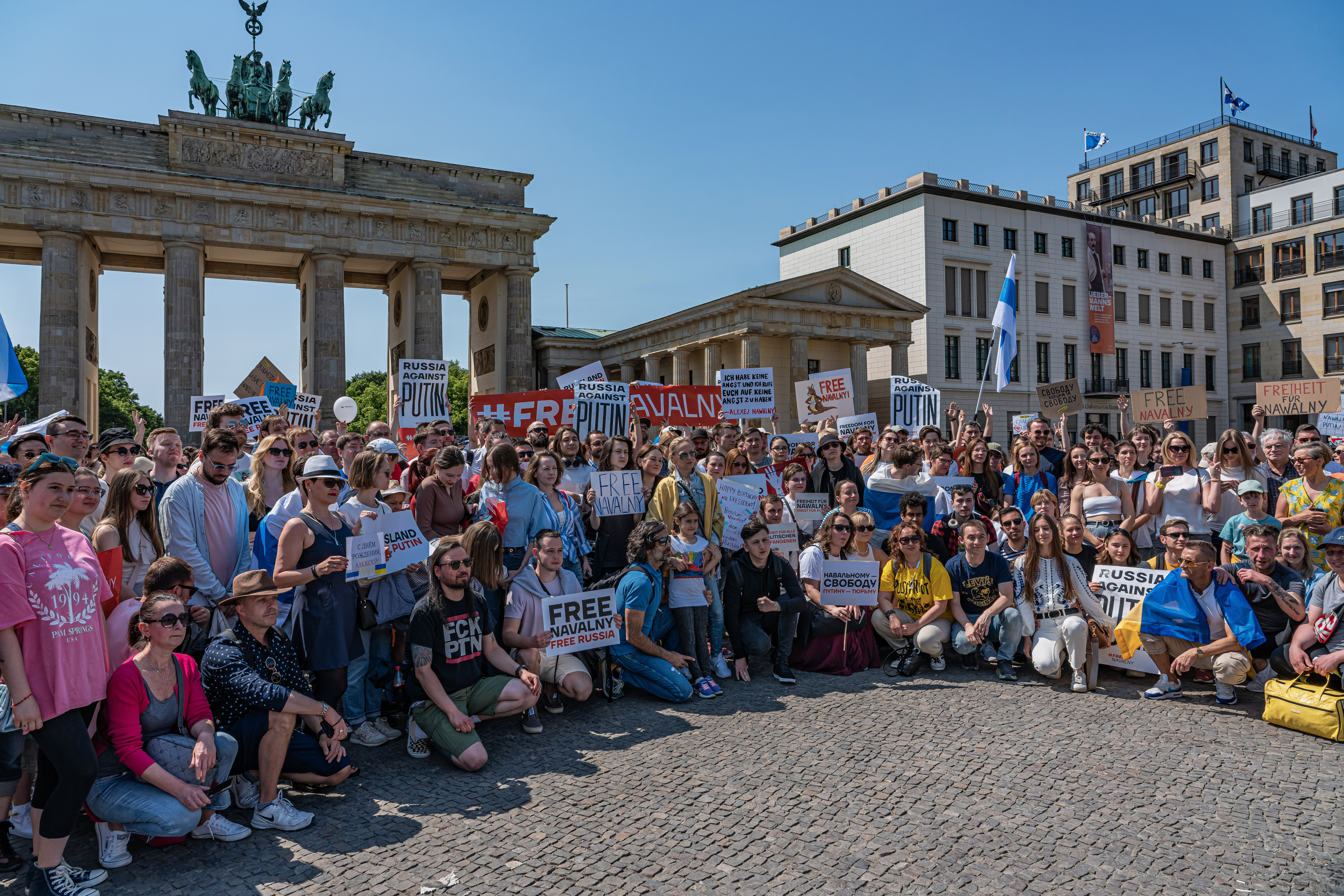
FreeNavalny rally in Berlin on Navalny's 47th birthday, 4 June 2023. Some protesters have a White-blue-white flag.

On 4 October 2022, allies of Navalny said they were relaunching his regional political network to fight the mobilization and war.

On 17 November 2022, Navalny stated that he was now in permanent solitary confinement. Infractions besides the attempt to start a labour union among the prisoners were that he did not button his collar, did not clean the prison yard well enough, and that he addressed a prison official by his military rank rather than his patronymic.

On 10 January 2023, over 400 doctors in Russia signed an open letter to president Putin demanding that prison authorities "stop abusing" Navalny, after it became known that he fell ill with flu in solitary confinement and his lawyers were not allowed to give him basic medication. Less than a month later, Navalny was transferred to an isolated punishment cell, a stricter form of imprisonment reserved for those who violate prison rules, for the maximum term of six months.

On 4 August 2023, Navalny was sentenced to an additional 19 years in a "special regime" colony on charges including publicly inciting extremist activity, financing extremist activity, and "rehabilitating Nazi ideology"; the Moscow City Court found him guilty on all charges in a closed-doors trial. In a social media post published the previous day, Navalny stated that he had expected to be given a "Stalinist" sentence and called on supporters to fight against corruption. According to his lawyers, following this latest sentencing, Navalny would have been released in December 2038.

On 13 October 2023, three of his lawyers, Vadim Kobzev, Igor Sergunin and Alexei Liptser, were detained on charges about participating in an "extremist group". Navalny commented that "Just like in Soviet times, not only political activists are being prosecuted and turned into political prisoners, but their lawyers, too".

=== In IK-3 "special regime" colony ===
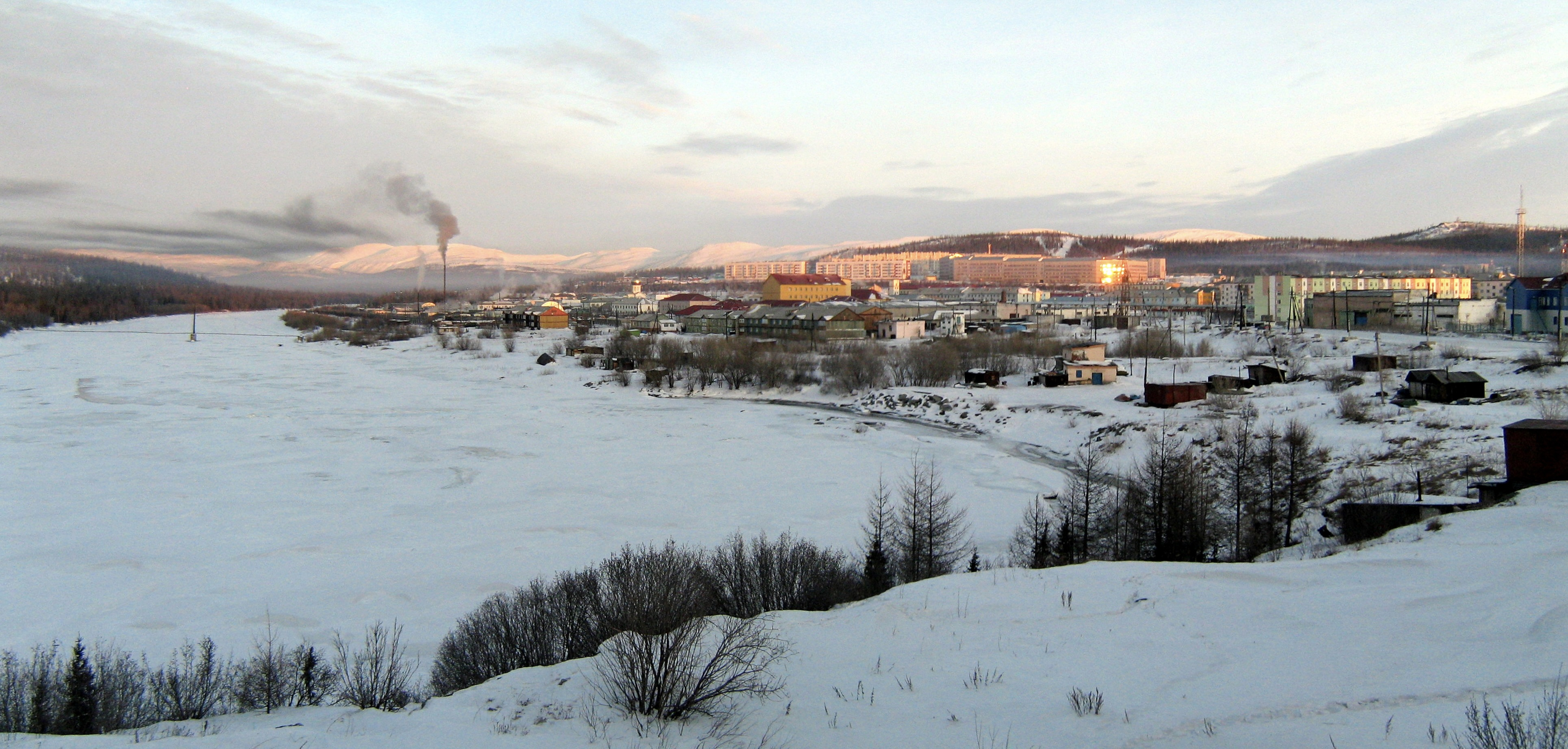
Kharp and IK-3

On 11 December 2023, Navalny's aides revealed that they had not had any contact with Navalny for six days. According to their statements, he was removed from the penal colony where he had been imprisoned and his current whereabouts are not known. The disappearance came after Navalny was sentenced to an additional 19 years in August and the beginning of campaigning for the 2024 Russian presidential election, which Putin recently announced his candidacy for. Navalny's aides had been preparing for his transfer to a "special regime" colony (the harshest grade in Russia's prison system). His last known whereabouts was the IK-6 prison camp in Vladimir Oblast, where on 15 December staff commented that Navalny had left the facility and was being moved to a different prison. On 25 December 2023 he was discovered to be in the IK-3 "special regime" colony, known as "Polar Wolf", in Kharp in the Yamalo-Nenets Autonomous Okrug. He remained there until his death on 16 February 2024.

=== Political prisoner status ===
Human Rights Centre Memorial recognised Navalny as a political prisoner in 2021. PACE also considered Navalny a political prisoner.

On 24 May 2024, DW News broadcast a piece which related that Navalny and Evan Gershkovich had in early 2024 almost been exchanged for Vadim Krasikov, who in August 2019 in Berlin's Tiergarten Park assassinated Zelimkhan Khangoshvili, a Georgian national and ethnic Chechen who opposed with violence Putin's regime.

== Death and legacy ==
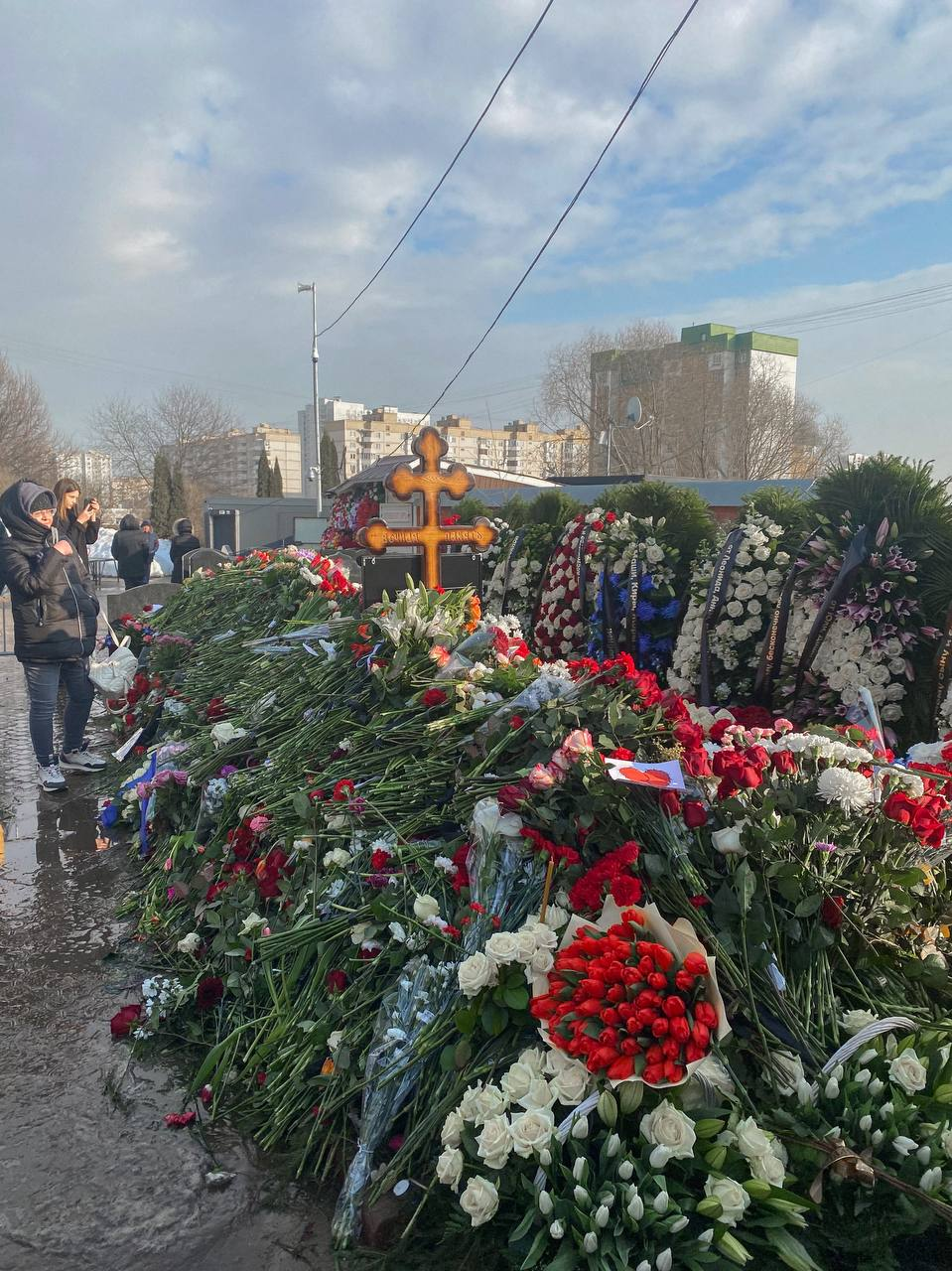
Alexei Navalny's grave, March 2024

On 16 February 2024, the Federal Penitentiary Service announced that Navalny had died in prison in Yamalo-Nenets in Western Siberia after taking a walk and feeling unwell that morning. He reportedly died at 14:17 Yekaterinburg Time. The prison statement stated: "All necessary resuscitation measures were carried out but did not yield positive results [...]. The paramedics confirmed the death of the convict." Kira Yarmysh, Navalny's spokeswoman, confirmed his death the following day and demanded his body to be returned to his family. Prior to his death, Navalny had been treated in a hospital after complaining of malnourishment and other ailments due to mistreatment in the prison. His body was returned to his mother on 24 February. On 27 February, Vasily Dubkov, a lawyer for Navalny, was briefly detained in Moscow for "violating public order", as part of the ongoing crackdowns on Navalny's legal team and the Anti-Corruption Foundation by Russian authorities. Navalny's funeral was held at the Church of the Icon of the Mother of God Soothe My Sorrows in Moscow on 1 March 2024.

Patriot, a memoir which Navalny started writing in Germany after being poisoned, was published posthumously on 22 October 2024, launched by his wife Yulia Navalnaya. He said that he planned to write "an autobiography with an intriguing thriller about uncovering an assassination attempt using chemical weapons", but then he says it turned into more of "a prison diary", which has led to comparisons with Aleksandr Solzhenitsyn and Vladimir Bukovsky. In 2025, the book was declared an "extremist material" by the Russian justice ministry.

In February 2026, at the Munich Security Conference the UK, Sweden, France, Germany, and the Netherlands made a joint statement that the death of Alexei Navalny was due to lethal poisoning by the Russian government with epibatidine, a neurotoxin secreted by poison dart frogs.

== Reception ==
=== Political activities ===
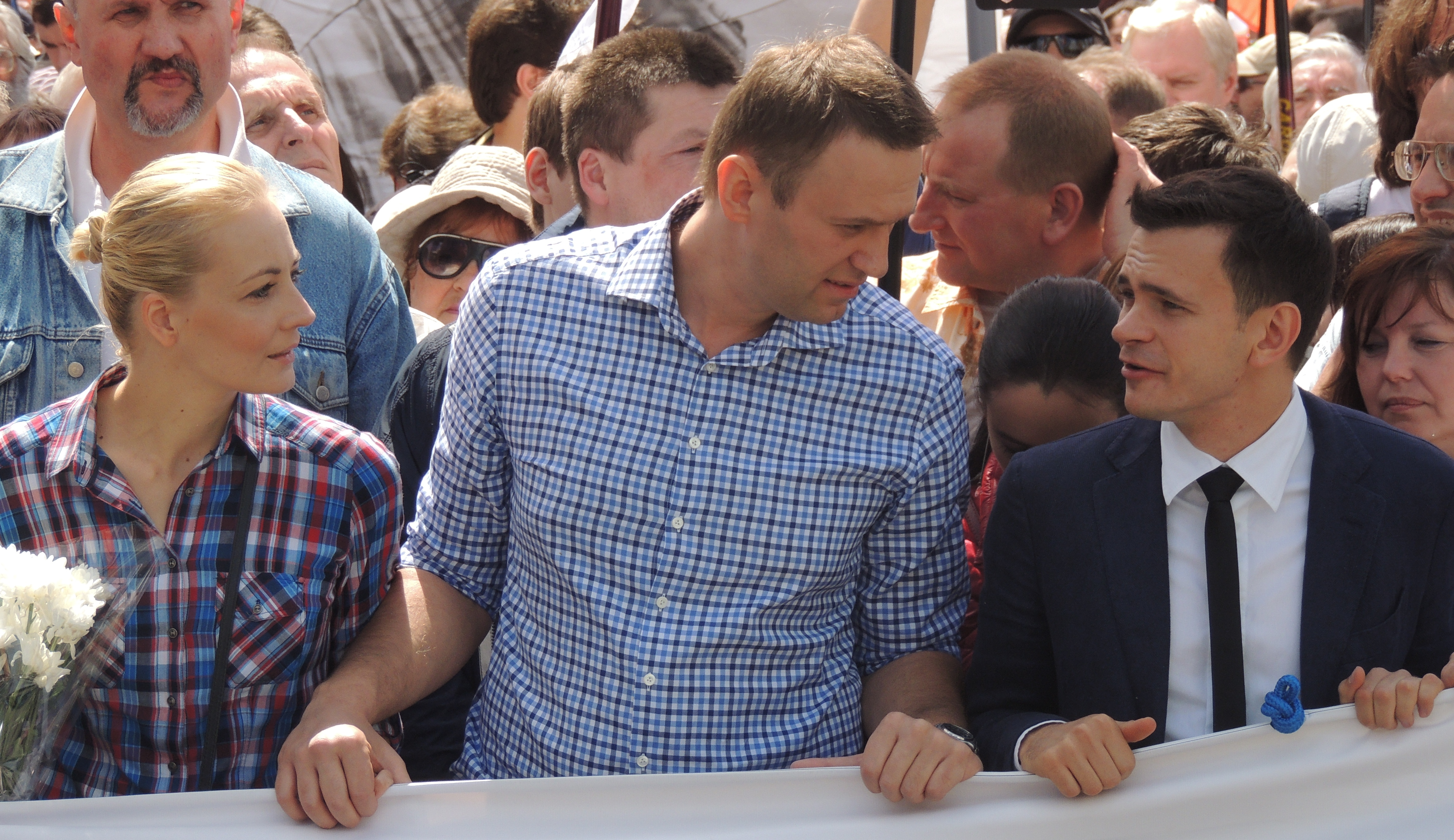
Navalny, his wife Yulia and Russian opposition politician Ilya Yashin, 12 June 2013

In October 2010, Navalny was the winner of an online poll for the mayor of Moscow, held by Kommersant and Gazeta.Ru. He received about 30,000 votes, or 45%, with the closest rival being "Against all candidates" with some 9,000 votes (14%), followed by former First Deputy Prime Minister of Russia Boris Nemtsov with 8,000 votes (12%) out of a total of about 67,000 votes.

The reaction to Navalny's actual mayoral election result in 2013, where he came second, was mixed: Nezavisimaya Gazeta declared, "The voting campaign turned a blogger into a politician", and following an October 2013 Levada Center poll that showed Navalny made it to the list of potential presidential candidates among Russians, receiving a rating of 5%, Konstantin Kalachev, the leader of the Political Expert Group, declared 5% was not the limit for Navalny, and unless something extraordinary happened, he could become "a pretender for a second place in the presidential race". On the other hand, The Washington Post published a column by Milan Svolik that stated the election was fair so the Sobyanin could show a clean victory, demoralising the opposition, which could otherwise run for street protests. Putin's press secretary Dmitry Peskov stated on 12 September, "His momentary result cannot testify his political equipment and does not speak of him as of a serious politician".

When referring to Navalny, Putin never actually pronounced his name in public, referring to him as a "mister" or the like; Julia Ioffe took it for a sign of weakness before the opposition politician, and Peskov later stated Putin never pronounced his name in order not to "give [Navalny] a part of his popularity". In July 2015, Bloomberg's sources "familiar with the matter" declared there was an informal prohibition from the Kremlin for senior Russian officials from mentioning Navalny's name. Peskov rejected the assumption there is such a ban; however, in doing so, he did not mention Navalny's name either.

=== Ratings ===
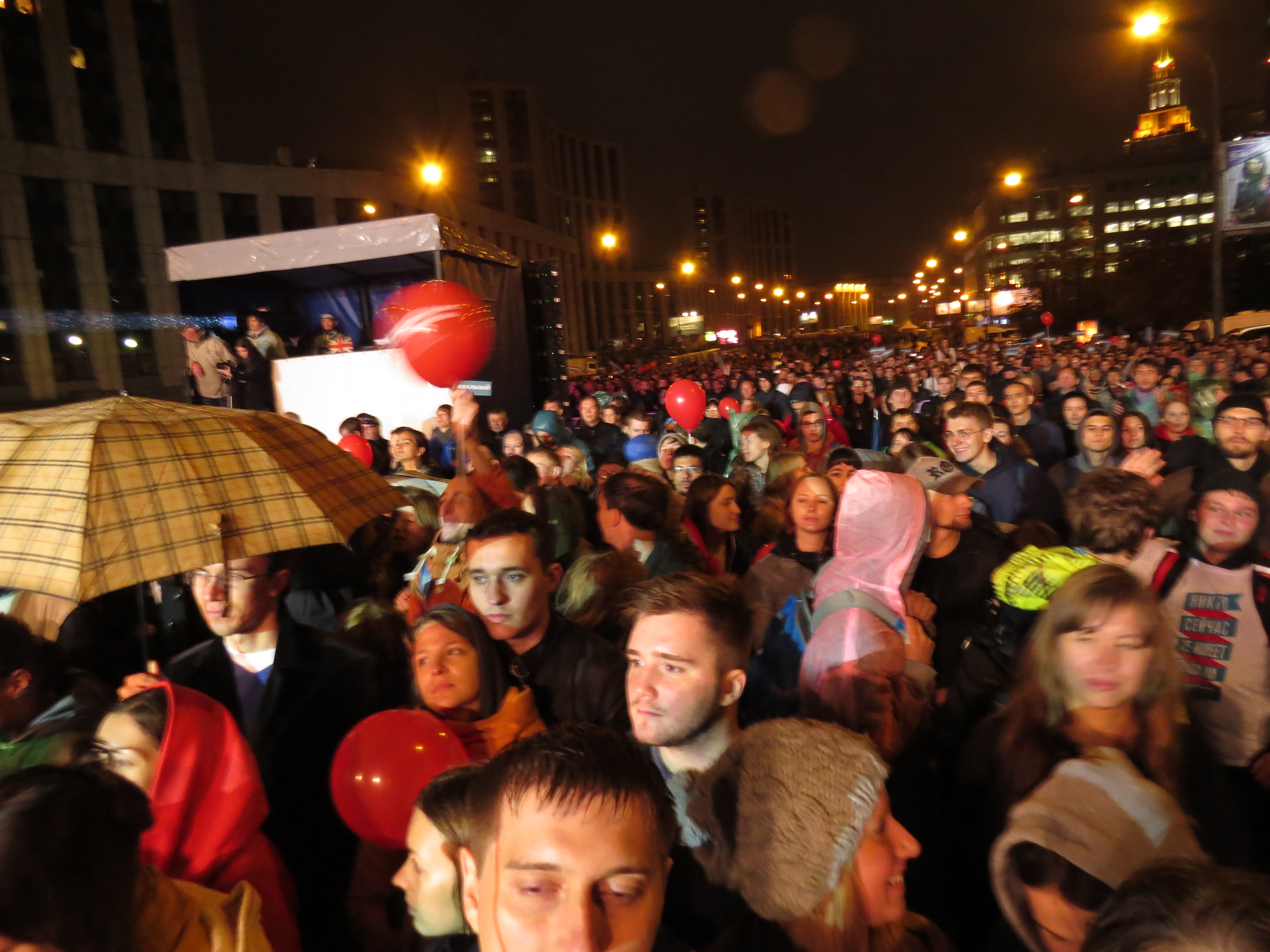
Rally concert in support of Navalny, 6 September 2013

In a 2013 Levada Center poll, Navalny's recognition among the Russian population stood at 37%. Out of those who were able to recognise Navalny, 14% would either "definitely" or "probably" support his presidential run.

The Levada Center also conducted another survey, which was released on 6 April 2017, showing Navalny's recognition among the Russian population at 55%. Out of those who recognised Navalny, 4% would "definitely" vote for him and 14% would "probably" vote for him in the presidential election. In another poll carried out by the same pollster in August 2020, 4% of respondents said that they trusted Navalny the most (out of a list of politicians), an increase from 2% in the previous month.

According to polls conducted by the Levada Center in September 2020, 20% of Russians approved of Navalny's activities, 50% disapproved, and 18% had never heard of him. Out of those who were able to recognise Navalny, 10% said that they had "respect" for him, 8% had sympathy and 15% "could not say anything bad" about him. 31% were "neutral" towards him, 14% "could not say anything good" about him and 10% disliked him.

=== Criminal cases ===
During and after the Kirovles trial, a number of prominent people expressed support to Navalny and/or condemned the trial. The last Soviet leader Mikhail Gorbachev called it "proof that we do not have independent courts". Former Minister of Finance Alexei Kudrin stated that it was "looking less like a punishment than an attempt to isolate him from social life and the electoral process". It was also criticised by novelist Boris Akunin, and jailed Russian oligarch Mikhail Khodorkovsky, who called it similar to the treatment of political opponents during the Soviet era.

Vladimir Zhirinovsky, leader of the nationalist LDPR, called the verdict "a direct warning to our 'fifth column'", and added, "This will be the fate of everyone who is connected with the West and works against Russia". A variety of state officials condemned the verdict. United States Department of State Deputy Spokesperson Marie Harf stated that the United States was "very disappointed by the conviction and sentencing of opposition leader Aleksey Navalniy". The spokesperson for European Union High Representative Catherine Ashton said that the outcome of the trial "raises serious questions as to the state of the rule of law in Russia". Andreas Schockenhoff, Germany's Commissioner for German-Russian Coordination, stated, "For us, it's further proof of authoritarian policy in Russia, which doesn't allow diversity and pluralism". The New York Times commented in response to the verdict that "President Vladimir Putin of Russia actually seems weak and insecure".

The verdict in the case of Yves Rocher caused similar reactions. According to Alexei Venediktov, the verdict was "unfair", Oleg Navalny was taken "hostage", while Alexei was not jailed to avoid "furious reaction" from Putin, which was caused by the change of measure of restraint after the Kirovles trial. A number of deputies appointed by United Russia and LDPR found the verdict too mild. Experts interviewed by the BBC Russian Service expressed reactions close to the political positions their organisations generally stand on. The spokesperson for EU foreign policy chief Federica Mogherini stated the same day that the sentence was likely to be politically motivated.

Public opinion of Navalny in Russia varied over time. According to Levada Center, 20% of people thought the Kirovles case had been caused by an actual violation of law, while 54% agreed the rationale beyond the case was his anti-corruption activity in May 2011. In May 2013, the shares of people who held these opinions were 28% and 47%, respectively. In September 2013, the shares were 35% and 45%. The organisation suggested this had been caused by corresponding coverage in media. By September 2014, the percentages had undergone further changes, and equaled 37% and 38%. The center also stated the share of those who found the result of another criminal case against him was unfair and Navalny was not guilty dropped from 13% in July 2013 to 5% in January 2015, and the number of those who found the verdict was too tough also fell from 17% to 9%. The share of those who found the verdict to be either fair or too mild was 26% in July 2013, and has exceeded 35% since September 2013.

== Political positions ==
=== Corruption ===
A poster that won the Navalny contest entitled United Russia, a "party of crooks and thieves", 2011

In February 2011, in an interview with the radio station finam.fm, Navalny called the main Russian party, United Russia, a "party of crooks and thieves". In May 2011, the Russian government began a criminal investigation into Navalny, widely described in media as "revenge", and by Navalny himself as "a fabrication by the security services". Meanwhile, "party of crooks and thieves" became a popular slogan among the opposition.

=== Non-Russian ethnic groups ===
His views about Russian nationalism evolved over time. In 2011, Navalny stated that he considered himself a "nationalist democrat". He previously participated in the "Russian march" from 2006, a parade uniting Russian nationalist groups of all stripes, and was one of the co-organisers of the 2011 march. Navalny also called for ending federal subsidies to the "corrupt" and "ineffective" governments of Chechnya and other republics part of the North Caucasus.

In 2007, Navalny co-founded the National Russian Liberation Movement, known as NAROD (The People), which sets immigration policy as a priority. The movement allied itself with two nationalist groups, the Movement Against Illegal Immigration and Great Russia. In the same year, he released several anti-immigration videos, including one where he advocated the deportation of migrants. In one of the videos, in which he advocates for gun rights, he compares people from North Caucasus, home to many Muslims, to cockroaches and mimics shooting one who attempts to "attack" him. According to Leonid Volkov, Navalny later regretted making the 2007 video.

In 2013, after ethnic riots in a Moscow district took place, which were sparked by a murder committed by a migrant, Navalny sympathised with the anti-immigration movement and commented that ethnic tensions and crimes are inevitable because of failing immigration policies by the state. However, he later said that "The basis of my approach is that you have to communicate with nationalists and educate them... I think it's very important to explain to them that the problem of illegal immigration is not solved by beating up migrants but by other, democratic means".

Since 2016, Navalny deemphasized his past statements on immigration.

In June 2020, he spoke out in support of the Black Lives Matter protests against racism.

=== Same-sex marriage ===
In 2017, Leonid Volkov, Navalny's chief of staff, said that Navalny's team supported the legalisation of same-sex marriage.

=== Foreign policy ===
His views on foreign policy evolved over time. He had initially supported the Russo-Georgian War in 2008, having asked the Russian army to strike the Georgian General Staff, called Georgians "rodents" and requesting that all Georgian citizens be expelled from Russia. He later apologized for insulting the Georgians, while stating that his principled position remained unchanged. Navalny also argued in 2008 and again in 2017 that Russia should recognize the independence of Moldova's breakaway region of Transnistria.

==== Ukraine ====
In early 2012, Navalny said on Ukrainian TV that "Ukraine and Belarus are the natural allies of Russia and the Russian foreign policy should be maximally directed at integration with Ukraine and Belarus… In fact, we are one nation". During the same broadcast Navalny said that he is not against Ukraine's independence or national identity. He also claimed to see in Ukraine "a conspiracy to invade Ukraine with the aim of joining Russia is visible everywhere", and added "I will disappoint you – there are not four people sitting in the Kremlin who decide to add Ukraine to Russia or not."

In March 2014, after Russia's annexation of Crimea, Navalny urged further sanctions against officials and businessmen linked to Putin and proposed his own list of sanctions, saying that previous US and EU sanctions were "mocked". In October 2014, Navalny suggested that the fate of Crimea should be resolved by holding a new and fair referendum. Navalny also said that Putin's government should stop "sponsoring the war" in Donbas. Navalny strongly criticised Vladimir Putin's policies in Ukraine: "Putin likes to speak about the 'Russian world' but he is actually making it smaller. In Belarus, they sing anti-Putin songs at football stadiums; in Ukraine they simply hate us. In Ukraine now, there are no politicians who do not have extreme anti-Russian positions. Being anti-Russian is the key to success now in Ukraine, and that is our fault".

On 9 June 2017, Navalny acknowlegded the presence of Russian troops in Donbas, saying, "Of course, our troops are there," and stated that, if elected president of Russia, he would withdraw them. He pledged to implement Russia's obligations under the Minsk agreements, including transferring control of the Russia-Ukraine border back to Ukraine, which he hoped would begin the normalization of relations between the two countries. Navalny argued that, as a result of Putin's policies, Russia had turned Ukraine against it for years to come. He also said that the settlement process would require international monitoring and a peacekeeping contingent, as well as an amnesty for most people in Donbas and guarantees against unlawful reprisals.

Navalny regarded Russia’s 2014 Russian annexation of Crimea as a “harmful violation of international agreements”, while maintaining that the peninsula could not simply be returned to Ukraine. In July 2017, he stated that, if elected president of Russia, he would hold an “honest referendum” in Crimea under the joint supervision of Ukraine, Russia and the international community in an attempt to normalise the situation. He nevertheless maintained that the referendum should be conducted in accordance with Russian law.

In 2018, after the establishment of the autonomous Orthodox Church of Ukraine, an event labelled as the ending of more than three centuries of Russian spiritual and temporal control of the dominant faith in Ukraine, Navalny tweeted: "What took centuries to create has been destroyed by Putin and his idiots in four years ... Putin is the enemy of the Russian World."

In February 2022, Navalny compared the recognition of the Donetsk People's Republic and the Luhansk People's Republic by Russia to when Soviet leaders deployed troops to Afghanistan in 1979, describing both events as a distraction to the population from real issues. He said that he believed that while Putin will not allow Ukraine to develop, Russia will pay the same price, and that Putin needed to be removed to save Russia.

On 2 March 2022, Navalny urged Russian citizens to stage daily protests against Russia's invasion of Ukraine, saying Russia should not be a "nation of frightened people" and "cowards who pretend not to notice the aggressive war" launched by "our insane tsar".

If, to prevent war, we need to fill up the jails and police vans, we will fill up the jails and police vans. Everything has a price and now, in the spring of 2022, we should pay that price.

— Alexei Navalny

On 5 April 2022, referring to war crimes that took place in Ukraine, Navalny said the "monstrosity of lies" in the Russian state media "is unimaginable. And, unfortunately, so is its persuasiveness for those who have no access to alternative information." He tweeted that "warmongers" among Russian state media personalities "should be treated as war criminals. From the editors-in-chief to the talk show hosts to the news editors, [they] should be sanctioned now and tried someday." The next month, Navalny called the invasion a "stupid war" based on lies.

Navalny criticised the 2022 Russian mobilisation. During a court hearing on 21 September, he said: "I don't understand one thing. The army has a million people, Rosgvardia has 350,000 people, the Interior Ministry has another million and a half or two million people, and the Federal Penitentiary Service is full of people. Why are they drafting civilians?" In another court hearing two days later, Navalny said: "You won't shut my mouth with your ShIZO [punishment cell]. This is a crime against my country. I don't relate to it, and I won't be silent. I hope that everyone else who hears me will not be silent about it. Because what's happening now is much more terrible than any 12 or 112 days in a ShIZO [punishment cell]. This is a historic crime, this is involving hundreds of thousands of people in this crime".

On 20 February 2023, he condemned Putin for "destroying" Russia's own future "just to make our country look bigger on the map" and said that Russia must end its occupation of Ukraine and recognise Ukraine's borders as they were established in 1991 after the collapse of the Soviet Union. Navalny also said Russia would have to pay post-war reparations to Ukraine and called for an international investigation into war crimes, saying: "Tens of thousands of innocent Ukrainians have been murdered and pain and suffering have befallen millions more."

On 1 February 2024, Navalny and his allies called on supporters to protest President Vladimir Putin and the invasion of Ukraine during the third day of the 2024 Russian presidential election by all going to vote against Putin at the same time.

==== Syria ====
In 2016, Navalny spoke against the Russian intervention in the Syrian civil war, believing that there are internal problems in Russia that need to be dealt with rather than to get involved in foreign wars. He also said Russia should not "try to save Assad, who represents a military junta", and said entering the war in the same side as the Shia Islamist Iran and Hezbollah stoked anger among Russia's predominantly Sunni Muslim community.

== Awards and honours ==
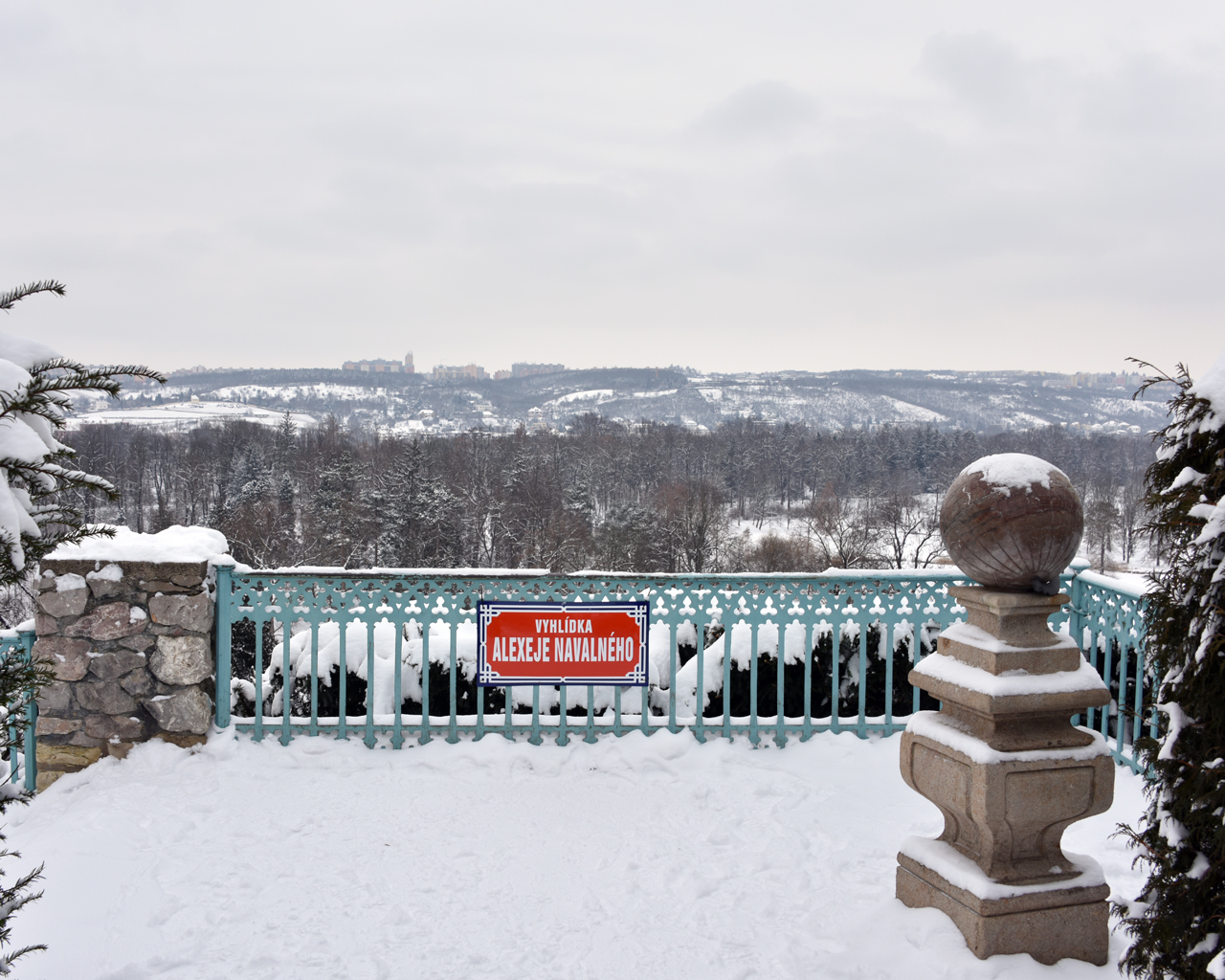
Scenic viewpoint of Alexei Navalny in Prague, 2021

Navalny was named "Person of the Year 2009" by Russian business newspaper Vedomosti and by stock exchange observer Stock in Focus.

On 22 April 2010, Navalny was awarded the Finance magazine prize in the nomination "for protecting the rights of minority shareholders".

In 2011, Foreign Policy magazine named Navalny to the FP Top 100 Global Thinkers, along with Daniel Domscheit-Berg and Sami Ben Gharbia of Tunisia, for "shaping the new world of government transparency". FP picked him again in 2012. He was listed by Time magazine in 2012 as one of the world's 100 most influential people, the only Russian on the list. In 2013, Navalny came in at No. 48 among "world thinkers" in an online poll by the UK magazine Prospect.

In 2015, Alexei and Oleg Navalny were chosen to receive the "Prize of the Platform of European Memory and Conscience 2015". According to the platform's statement, "The Members of the Platform have voted this year for the Navalny brothers, in recognition of their personal courage, struggle and sacrifices for upholding fundamental democratic values and freedoms in the Russian Federation today. By the award of the Prize, the Platform wishes to express its respect and support to Mr. Oleg Navalny whom the Platform considers a political prisoner, and to Mr. Alexei Navalny for his efforts to expose corruption, defend political pluralism and opposition to the mounting authoritarian regime in the Russian Federation".

In June 2017, Navalny was included in Time's list of the World's 25 Most Influential People on the Internet. In December 2017, he was named "Politician of the Year 2017" by Vedomosti.

He was named "Politician of the Year 2019" by readers of Vedomosti.

Navalny was nominated for the 2021 Nobel Peace Prize by multiple Norwegian members of parliament. An Internet petition to the Nobel Committee in support of Navalny's candidacy was signed by over 38,000 people.

Following Navalny's imprisonment in February 2021, the Boris Nemtsov Foundation for Freedom awarded Navalny with the Boris Nemtsov Prize for Courage. A scenic viewpoint of Alexei Navalny was also set in Prague in direct view from the Russian Embassy, near Boris Nemtsov Square in front of the Russian Embassy and the Anna Politkovskaya Promenade.

On 8 June 2021, Navalny's daughter accepted the Moral Courage Award at the Geneva Summit for Human Rights and Democracy on behalf of her father. Navalny dedicated the prize to political prisoners. In September 2021, Navalny was included in Time's list of the 100 most influential people. This was his second appearance on the list, having previously been included in 2012.

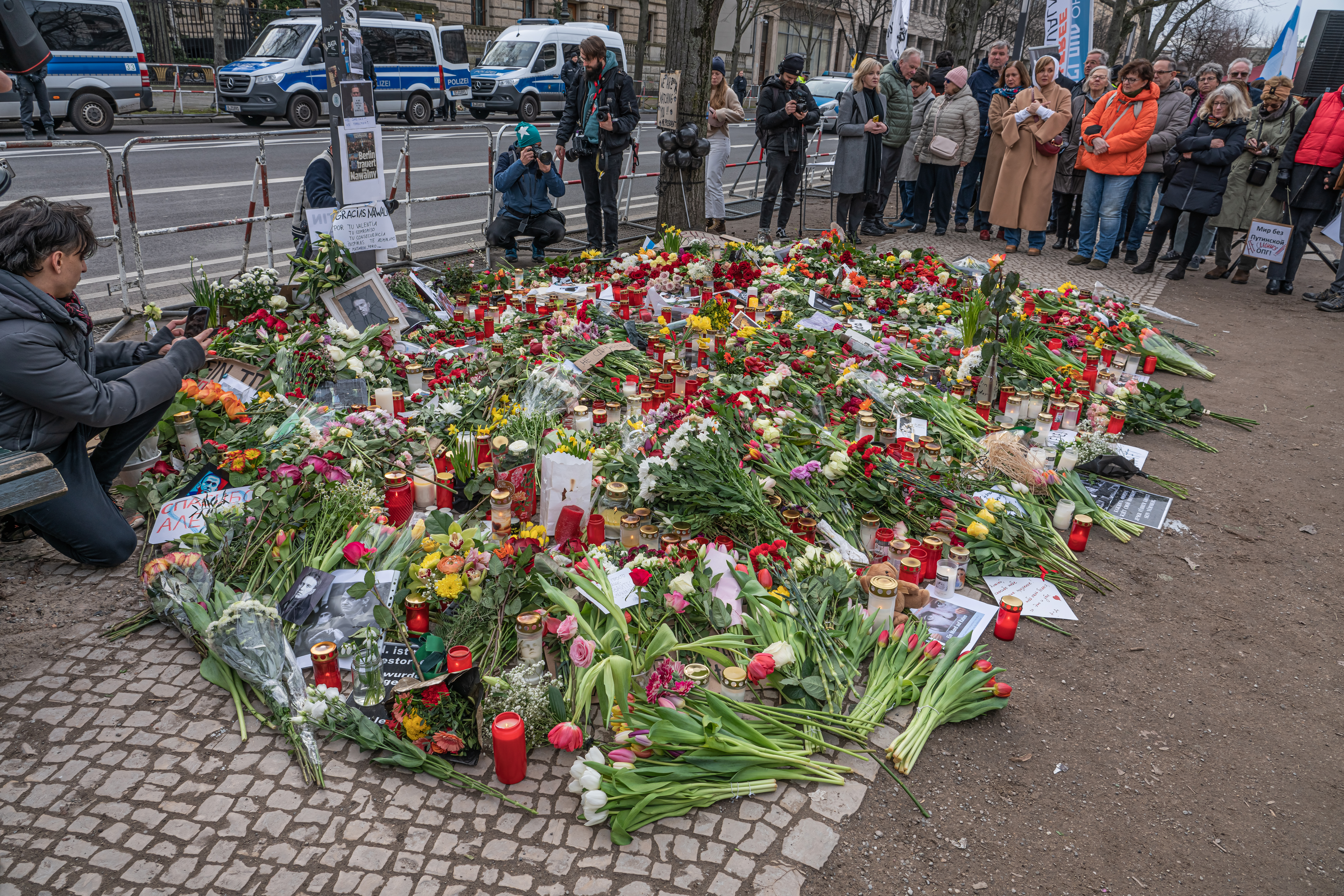
Memorial after Navalny's death in front of the Embassy of Russia, Berlin, Germany

In September 2021, he was awarded the Knight of Freedom Award conferred by the Casimir Pulaski Foundation.

In October 2021, he received the Sakharov Prize, the European Parliament's annual human rights prize. David Sassoli, the President of the European Parliament, announced that the award was to recognise that Navalny "has fought tirelessly against the corruption of Vladimir Putin's regime. This cost him his liberty and nearly his life".

Later that same year, he also received a German prize for his efforts in sustaining freedom of expression – the M100 Media Award.

In 2022, he was awarded U.S. Prize For Civil Courage.

In 2023, the documentary film about him, Navalny, directed by Daniel Roher, won Best Documentary at the 76th British Academy Film Awards and Best Documentary Feature at the 95th Academy Awards.

=== Monument in Helsinki ===
Alexei Navalny Monument in Helsinki, 2026

A monument to Aleksei Navalny was unveiled in Helsinki in 2026. The monument is located in Helsinki's Neitsytpuisto, next to the Russian Embassy. It was unveiled on what would have been his 50th birthday. The monument is a bench with red-painted legs that form the first letter of Navalny's name in Cyrillic. A plaque attached to the bench bears Navalny's quote: "If I am murdered, do not give up".

Eight days after the monument was unveiled, it was attempted to destroy by burning its wooden parts. A representative of the association responsible for the work said that it had anticipated that the monument would attract provocation, so it was designed to withstand vandalism.

== Family and personal life ==
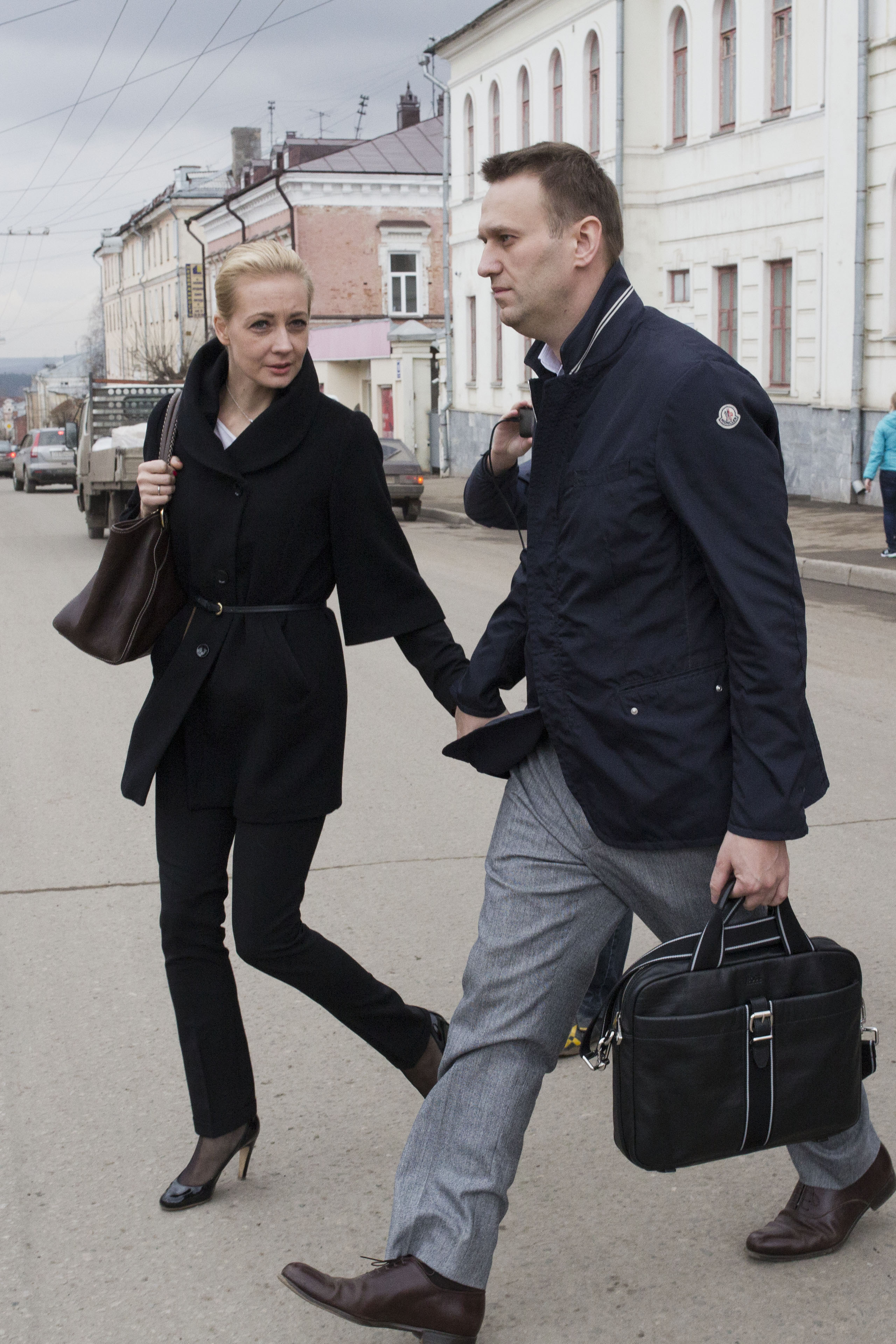
Navalny and his wife Yulia in 2013

Navalny was married to Yulia Navalnaya (maiden name: Yulia Borisovna Abrosimova) and the couple had two children. His daughter Daria Navalnaya began undergraduate studies at Stanford University in September 2019.

Starting 1998, Navalny lived primarily in a three-room apartment in Maryino District in southeast Moscow.

Navalny was originally an atheist, but later became a member of the Russian Orthodox Church. He has said that turning to the Orthodox church has made him feel a "part of something large and universal."

On 17 January 2021, Navalny was again arrested as he was returning to Russia, after having had to leave the country for medical treatment in Germany for a poisoning attempt against his life that had recently occurred in Russia. He remained incarcerated (initially in the IK-2 penal colony) and was housed in the IK-6 maximum security prison in Melekhovo, Vladimir Oblast. Navalny was listed by Amnesty International (AI) as a prisoner of conscience in May 2021, meaning that AI held that Navalny's incarceration was primarily due to his political beliefs.

In addition to his native Russian, Navalny also spoke English.

== Books and publications ==
- Opposing Forces: Plotting the New Russia (8 December 2016)
- "Vladimir Putin: The 100 Most Influential People of 2022", Time 100, Time, 23 May 2022
- Patriot (22 October 2024), a memoir written while he was in prison

== See also ==
- 2017–2018 Russian protests
- 2020 Russian protests
- 2021 Russian protests
- List of Amnesty International-designated prisoners of conscience
- List of people who survived assassination attempts
- List of prison deaths
- List of solved missing person cases (2020s)
- Suspicious Russia-related deaths since 2022

== Explanatory notes ==
Exchange rates used in the article

Party political offices
| New political party | Leader of Russia of the Future; 2013–2024 | Vacant |
