= List of banned political parties =

This article provides a list of political parties that were or are currently banned by the countries in which they were or are based. Party bans can be democratic or authoritarian. "Altering the character of the nation" has been referenced as an argument for banning parties. Ethnic party bans are prevalent in parts of Africa. Party bans can contribute to political violence, political repression, or political bias. Restrictive nomination rules can have similar effects to party bans.

== Asia ==
=== Bangladesh ===
| Name | Native name(s) | Ideology | Year banned | Reference(s) |
|---|---|---|---|---|
| Awami League | Bengali: বাংলাদেশ আওয়ামী লীগ | Big-tent | 2025 | |

=== Bhutan ===
| Name | Native name(s) | Ideology | Year banned | Reference(s) |
|---|---|---|---|---|
| Bhutan People's Party | | Democratic socialism, Lhotshampa interests | 1990 | |
| Communist Party of Bhutan (Marxist–Leninist–Maoist) | | Communism, Marxism-Leninism-Maoism, republicanism | 2003 | |

=== China ===
| Name | Native name(s) | Ideology | Year banned | Reference(s) |
|---|---|---|---|---|
| Zhi Xian Party | Chinese: 中国至宪党 | Chinese New Left, Chongqing model, Maoism | 2013 | |

=== Hong Kong ===
| Name | Native name(s) | Ideology | Year banned | Reference(s) |
|---|---|---|---|---|
| Hong Kong National Party | 香港民族黨 | Hong Kong independence | 2018 | |

=== Thailand ===
All political parties, except for the Democrat Party, were dissolved following the 2006 coup d'état and their members banned from seeking office for five years. Thai Rak Thai Party members joined the People's Power Party after the TRT was banned and then the Pheu Thai Party after the PPP was banned. Thai Nation Party members joined the Chart Thai Pattana Party after their party was banned.

Legend: TRT lineage FFP lineage

| Name | Native name(s) | Ideology | Year banned | Reference(s) |
|---|---|---|---|---|
| Communist Party of Thailand | | Communism | | |
| Thais Love Thais Party | Phak Thai Rak Thai | Populism | 2007 | |
| Pandin Thai | | | 2007 | |
| Prachatipatai Kaona | | | 2007 | |
| Pattana Chart Thai | | | 2007 | |
| People's Power Party | Phak Phalang Prachachon | Populism | 2008 | |
| Thai Nation Party | | | 2008 | |
| Neutral Democratic Party | Phak Matchima Thippathai | Populism | 2008 | |
| Future Forward Party | Phak Anakhot Mai | Social democracy | 2020 | |
| Move Forward Party | Phak Kao Klai | Social democracy | 2024 | |

=== Sri Lanka ===
All parties listed below are no longer banned.

| Name | Native name(s) | Ideology | Year banned | Reference(s) |
|---|---|---|---|---|
| Ilankai Tamil Arasu Kachchi | Tamil: இலங்கைத் தமிழர்சுக் கட்சி | Sri Lankan Tamil nationalism | 1958 | |
| Jathika Vimukthi Peramuna | Sinhala: ජාතික විමුක්ති පෙරමුණ | Sinhalese Buddhist nationalism, far-right | 1958 | |
| Janatha Vimukthi Peramuna | Sinhala: ජනතා විමුක්ති පෙරමුණ, Tamil: மக்கள் விடுதலை முன்னணி | Marxism–Leninism, Communism | 1971, 1983 | |
| Ceylon Communist Party (Moscow Wing) | Sinhala: ලංකා කොමියුනිස්ට් පක්ෂය, Tamil: சிலோன் கம்யூனிஸ்ட் கட்சி | Marxism–Leninism, Communism | 1983 | |
| Nava Sama Samaja Party | Sinhala: නව සම සමාජ පක්ෂය, Tamil: நவ சமசமாஜக் கட்சி | Communism, Trotskyism | 1983 | |
| Tamil United Liberation Front | Tamil: தமிழர் ஐக்கிய விடுதலை முன்னணி | Sri Lankan Tamil nationalism | 1983 | |

=== Nepal ===
King Tribhuvan of Nepal banned the Communist Party of Nepal. The Nepali Congress, under the leadership of BP Koirala, won the 1959 election, but King Mahendra of Nepal dissolved the House of Representatives on 15 December 1960. The Rastriya Panchayat was formed and all political parties were banned.

A referendum was held in 1980 to determine whether to maintain the Panchayat system or institute a multi-party system. The Panchayat system was maintained with 54% of the vote. On 6 April 1990, King Birendra of Nepal ended the ban on political parties in response to the 1990 Nepalese revolution and the 1991 election was the first multi-party election since 1960.

| Name | Native name(s) | Ideology | Year banned | Reference(s) |
|---|---|---|---|---|
| Communist Party of Nepal | | Communism | | |
| Nepali Congress | | Social democracy Democratic socialism | | |

=== Japan ===
In occupied Japan, Douglas MacArthur considered banning the Japanese Communist Party (JCP) on 3 May 1950. (Red Purge) Twenty-four members of the JCP's central committee were removed from office in June and its newspaper, Shimbun Akahata, was banned on June 27.

=== Philippines ===
| Name | Native name(s) | Ideology | Year banned | Year legalize | Notes | Reference(s) |
|---|---|---|---|---|---|---|
| Philippine Communist Party | Partido Komunista ng Pilipinas-1930 | Communism | 1957 | 1992 | | |
| Communist Party of the Philippines | Partido Komunista ng Pilipinas | Communism | 1968 | 1992 (ban reinstated 2020) | | |
| Duterte Youth | Duterte Youth | Dutertism | 2025 | | Retrospectively banned from running | |

=== Turkey ===
All political parties were dissolved following the 1980 coup d'état and other parties were banned after of the many coup d'états in the 20th century.

Legend: CHP lineage DP lineage MP lineage MNP lineage HEP tradition

| Name | Native name(s) | Ideology | Year banned | Reference(s) |
|---|---|---|---|---|
| Progressive Republican Party | Terakkiperver Cumhuriyet Fırkası | | 1925 | |
| People's Republican Party (Turkey) | Ahali Cumhuriyet Fırkası | | 1931 | |
| Peasants and Villagers Party | Çiftçi ve Köylü Partisi | | 1946 | |
| Islamic Protection Party | İslam Koruma Partisi | Islamism | 1946 | |
| Türkiye Sosyalist Emekçi ve Köylü Partisi | Türkiye Sosyalist Emekçi ve Köylü Partisi | Socialism | 1946 | |
| Democratic Workers' Party | Demokrat İşçi Partisi | | 1950 | |
| | Güden Partisi | | 1951 | |
| Islamic Democratic Party (Turkey) | İslam Demokrat Partisi | Islamism | 1952 | |
| Turkey Socialist Party | Türkiye Sosyalist Partisi | Socialism | 1952 | |
| Nation Party | Millet Partisi | Nationalism | 1954 | |
| Small Party | Ufak Parti | | 1957 | |
| Democrat Party | Demokrat Parti | Liberal conservatism | 1960 | |
| Equality Party | Müsavat Partisi | | 1961 | |
| Homeland Party (1954) | Vatan Partisi | Marxism-Leninism | 1966 | |
| Workers' and Farmers' Party | İşçi-Çiftçi Partisi | | 1968 | |
| Workers' Party of Turkey | Türkiye İşçi Partisi | Socialism | 1971 | |
| Turkey Progressive Idealist Party | Türkiye İleri Ülkü Partisi | | 1971 | |
| National Order Party | Millî Nizam Partisi | Millî Görüş | 1971 | |
| Great Anatolian Party | Büyük Anadolu Partisi | | 1972 | |
| Turkish Labor Party | Türkiye Emekçi Partisi | | 1980 | |
| Justice Party | Adalet Partisi | Liberal conservatism | 1981 | |
| Democratic Party | Demokratik Parti | Liberal conservatism | 1981 | |
| Nation Party | Millet Partisi | Nationalism | 1981 | |
| Nationalist Movement Party | Milliyetçi Hareket Partisi | Nationalism | 1981 | |
| National Salvation Party | Millî Selamet Partisi | Millî Görüş | 1981 | |
| Republican People's Party | Cumhuriyet Halk Partisi | Kemalism | 1981 | |
| Republican Reliance Party | Cumhuriyetçi Güven Partisi | Kemalism | 1981 | |
| National Women's Party of Turkey | Türkiye Ulusal Kadınlar Partisi | Feminism | 1981 | |
| Unity Party of Turkey | Türkiye Birlik Partisi | Alevi interests | 1981 | |
| Socialist Workers' Party of Turkey | Türkiye Sosyalist İşçi Partisi | Marxism-Leninism | 1981 | |
| Homeland Party (1954) (second time) | Vatan Partisi | Marxism-Leninism | 1981 | |
| Workers' Party of Turkey (second time) | Türkiye İşçi Partisi | Socialism | 1981 | |
| Socialist Revolution Party | Sosyalist Devrim Partisi | Democratic socialism | 1981 | |
| Order Party | Nizam Partisi | | 1981 | |
| Workers' and Peasants' Party of Turkey | Türkiye İşçi Köylü Partisi | Socialism | 1981 | |
| Socialist Homeland Party | Sosyalist Vatan Partisi | Socialism | 1981 | |
| Libertarian Nation Party | Hürriyetçi Millet Partisi | | 1981 | |
| Free Democrats Party | Hür Demokratlar Partisi | | 1981 | |
| Turkish Peace Party | Türkiye Huzur Partisi | | 1983 | |
| People's Party (Turkey, 1989) | Halk Partisi | Kemalism | 1991 | |
| United Communist Party of Turkey | Türkiye Birleşik Komünist Partisi | Marxism-Leninism | 1991 | |
| Socialist Party (Turkey, 1988) | Sosyalist Parti | Socialism | 1992 | |
| People's Labour Party | Halkın Emek Partisi | Kurdish nationalism | 1993 | |
| Freedom and Democracy Party | Özgürlük ve Demokrasi Partisi | Kurdish nationalism | 1993 | |
| Democracy Party | Demokrasi Partisi | Kurdish nationalism | 1994 | |
| Welfare Party | Refah Partisi | Millî Görüş | 1998 | |
| Democracy and Change Party | Demokrasi ve Değişim Partisi | Kurdish nationalism | 1995 | |
| Virtue Party | Fazilet Partisi | Millî Görüş | 2001 | |
| People's Democracy Party | Halkın Demokrasi Partisi | Kurdish nationalism | 2003 | |
| Democratic Society Party | Demokratik Toplum Partisi | Kurdish nationalism | 2009 | |

=== Iran ===
| Name | Native name(s) | Ideology | Year banned | Reference(s) |
|---|---|---|---|---|
| Islamic Iran Participation Front | | | 2010 | |
| Mojahedin of the Islamic Revolution of Iran Organization | | | 2010 | |

=== Iraq ===
| Name | Native name(s) | Ideology | Year banned | Reference(s) |
|---|---|---|---|---|
| Islamic Dawa Party | | | | |

=== South Korea ===
| Name | Native name(s) | Ideology | Year banned | Reference(s) |
|---|---|---|---|---|
| Unified Progressive Party | Korean: 통합진보당 | Progressivism | 2014 | |

=== Syria ===
Following the fall of the Assad regime in December 2024, the new Syrian caretaker government banned all political parties that were part of the pro-Assad National Progressive Front.

| Name | Native name(s) | Ideology | Year banned | Reference(s) |
|---|---|---|---|---|
| Arab Socialist Ba'ath Party | Arabic: حزب البعث العربي الاشتراكي | Ba'athism | 2025 | |
| Syrian Social Nationalist Party | Arabic: الحزب السوري القومي الاجتماعي | Social nationalism | 2025 | |
| Arab Socialist Movement | Arabic: حركة الاشتراكيين العرب | Arab socialism | 2025 | |
| Arab Socialist Union Party of Syria | Arabic: حزب الاتحاد الاشتراكي العربي في سورية | Arab socialism | 2025 | |
| Syrian Communist Party (Bakdash) | Arabic: الحزب الشيوعي السوري | Communism | 2025 | |
| Syrian Communist Party (Unified) | Arabic: الحزب الشيوعي السوري (الموحد) | Communism | 2025 | |
| Social Democratic Unionists | Arabic: الوحدويون الديمقراطيون الاجتماعيون | Social democracy | 2025 | |
| Socialist Unionist Party | Arabic: حزب الوحدويين الاشتراكيين | Arab socialism | 2025 | |
| Democratic Socialist Unionist Party | Arabic: الحزب الوحدوي الاشتراكي الديمقراطي | Democratic socialism | 2025 | |
| Arab Democratic Union Party | Arabic: حزب الاتحاد العربي الديمقراطي | Arab socialism | 2025 | |
| National Covenant Party | Arabic: حركة العهد الوطني | Arab socialism | 2025 | |

=== Vietnam ===
| Name | Native name(s) | Ideology | Year banned | Reference(s) |
|---|---|---|---|---|
| Vietnamese Reform Revolutionary Party | Việt Tân | Reformism | 2016 | |

== Africa ==
=== Algeria ===
| Name | Native name(s) | Ideology | Year banned | Reference(s) |
|---|---|---|---|---|
| Algerian Communist Party | Arabic: لحزب الشيوعي الجزائري, French: Parti Communiste Algérien | Communism, Marxism-Leninism | 1962 | |
| Algerian National Movement | Arabic: لحركة الوطنية الجزائرية, Berber languages: Amussu Aɣelnaw Adzayri, French: Mouvement National Algérien | | | |
| Arab Socialist Ba'ath Party of Algeria | Arabic: حزب البعث العربي الاشتراكي في الجزائر, romanized: Hizb Al-Ba'ath Al-Arabi Al-Ishtiraki fy Aljeza'ir, French: Parti Ba'ath Arabe Socialiste d'Algérie | Neo-Ba'athism, Saddamism | | |
| Étoile Nord-Africaine (North African Star) | Arabic: نجم شمال أفريقيا | | 1937 | |
| Islamic Salvation Front | Arabic: الجبهة الإسلامية للإنقاذ, romanized: al-Jabhah al-Islāmiyah lil-Inqādh, French: Front Islamique du Salut | Anti-democracy, Islamism, Jihadism, Qutbism | 1992 | |
| Liberal Social Party | French: Parti Social Libéral | | 1998 | |
| Party of the Socialist Revolution | Arabic: حزب الثورة الاشتراكية,French: Parti de la Révolution Socialiste | Socialism | | |
| Wafaa | | | 2000 | |

=== Burkina Faso ===
The military government that took over Burkina Faso in September 2022 banned all political parties on 29 January 2026.

=== Egypt ===
All political parties were banned in 1953, following the 1952 Egyptian revolution, but were allowed to exist in 1976.

| Name | Native name(s) | Ideology | Year banned | Reference(s) |
|---|---|---|---|---|
| Anti-Coup Alliance | Arabic: التحالف الوطني لدعم الشرعية | Islamism | 2014 | |
| Arab Socialist Ba'ath Party - Egypt Region | Arabic: حزب البعث العربي الاشتراكي - مصر, romanized: Hizb Al-Ba'ath Al-Arabi Al-Ishtiraki – Misr | Neo-Ba'athism, Saddamism | | |
| Democratic Movement for National Liberation | Arabic: الحركة الديمقراطية للتحرر الوطنى | Communism, Marxism, revolutionary socialism | 1953 | |
| Egyptian Communist Organisation | Arabic: المنظمة الشيوعية المصرية, romanized: al-Munaẓẓamah aš-Šiūʿīah al-Miṣriyyah | Communism | | |
| Freedom and Justice Party | Arabic: حزب الحرية والعدالة, romanized: Ḥizb al-Ḥurriyyah wa-l-ʿAdālah | Islamism, mixed economy, social conservatism | | |
| Independence Party | Arabic: حزب الاستقلال | Islamism | 2014 | |
| Jewish Anti-Zionist League | Arabic: الرابطة الإسرائيلية لمكافحة الصهيونية | Anti-colonialism, anti-racism, communism, Jewish anti-Zionism | | |
| Liberal Constitutional Party | Arabic: حزب الاحرار الدستوريين, romanized: Ḥizb al-aḥrār al-dustūriyyīn | Constitutionalism, social liberalism | 1952 | |
| Muslim Brotherhood | Arabic: جماعة الاخوان المسلمين, romanized: jamāʿat al-ʾiḫwān/al-ikhwan/el-ekhwan al-muslimīn | Mixed economy, social conservatism, Sunni Islamism | | |
| National Democratic Party | Arabic: الحزب الوطني الديمقراطي, romanized: Al-Ḥizb Al-Waṭanī Ad-Dīmūqrāṭī | Egyptian nationalism, populism | 2011 | |
| Wafd Party | Arabic: حزب الوفد, romanized: Ḥizb al-Wafd, lit. 'Delegation Party' | Egyptian nationalism, national liberalism | 1953 | |
| Watani Party | Arabic: ﺍﻟﺤﺰﺐ ﺍﻟﻮﻃﻨﻲ, romanized: al-Ḥizb al-Waṭanī, lit. 'National Party' | Anglophobia, anti-imperialism, Egyptian nationalism | 1953 | |

=== Eswatini ===
| Name | Native name(s) | Ideology | Year banned | Reference(s) |
|---|---|---|---|---|
| Communist Party of Swaziland | | Communism | | |
| Convention for Full Democracy in Swaziland | | | | |
| Ngwane National Liberatory Congress | | African socialism | | |
| Ngwane Socialist Revolutionary Party | | | | |
| People's United Democratic Movement | | Democratic socialism | | |
| Swaziland National Front | | | | |

=== Sudan ===
Jaafar Nimeiry overthrew the government in 1969, and banned all political parties. He was overthrown by a coup d'état in 1985, and a new government was formed by Abdel Rahman Swar al-Dahab. He legalized political parties, but they were banned again after Omar al-Bashir overthrew the government.

| Name | Native name(s) | Ideology | Year banned | Reference(s) |
|---|---|---|---|---|
| Sudanese Ba'ath Party | | Ba'athism | | |
| Sudanese Communist Party | | Communism | 1989 | |
| National Congress Party | المؤتمر الوطني | Islamism | 2019 | |

== Americas ==
=== Argentina ===
In 1943, Pedro Pablo Ramírez banned all political parties after overthrowing the government.

=== Brazil ===
The Brazilian Communist Party was suppressed during the Vargas Era, but were later able to participate in the 1945 and 1947 elections. However, the party was banned by Eurico Gaspar Dutra in May 1947, and all of its elected officials, barring those elected with support from other parties, were removed from office.

Brazilian Integralist Action was banned after the Integralist Uprising in 1938.

| Name | Native name(s) | Ideology | Year banned | Reference(s) |
|---|---|---|---|---|
| Brazilian Communist Party | | Communism | 1947 | |
| Brazilian Integralist Action | | Brazilian Integralism | 1938 | |

=== Peru ===
| Name | Native name(s) | Ideology | Year banned | Reference(s) |
|---|---|---|---|---|
| National Alliance of Workers, Farmers, University Students, and Reservists | Alianza Nacional de Trabajadores, Agricultores, Universitarios, Reservistas y Obreros | Ethnocacerism | 2024 | |

=== United States ===
Multiple states, including California, directly banned the Communist Party USA while other states indirectly did so by banning parties that supported overthrowing the government using violence. Communist candidates were removed from the ballot in Arizona and Georgia in 1940, as the secretaries of state ruled that they could not honestly take the oath to uphold the Constitution of the United States. In 1954, the US government passed the Communist Control Act of 1954 which outlawed the party and made membership in the party a criminal offense. Most of those provisions, however, have either been repealed or ruled unconstitutional.

| Name | Native name(s) | Ideology | Year banned | Reference(s) |
|---|---|---|---|---|
| Communist Party USA | | Communism | 1954 | |

== Europe ==
=== Austria ===
Austria, under Kurt Schuschnigg and the Vaterländische Front (Fatherland Front), banned all political parties from 1934 up until the Anschluss in 1938, when all parties were banned under Nazi rule.

=== Czech Republic ===
All political parties were banned in the Protectorate of Bohemia and Moravia after the occupation of Czechoslovakia in 1939.

| Name | Native name(s) | Ideology | Year banned | Reference(s) |
|---|---|---|---|---|
| Workers' Party (Czech Republic) | | Far right | 2010 | |

=== Estonia ===
In 1934, following the Estonian coup d'état, all political parties were banned (Era of Silence). Following the Soviet occupation of Estonia in 1940, the Communist Party of Estonia became the single legal party in the Estonian SSR while all other parties remained banned.

| Name | Native Name(s) | Ideology | Year Banned | Notes | Reference |
|---|---|---|---|---|---|
| Communist Party of Estonia (CPSU) | Estonian: Eestimaa Kommunistlik Partei; Russian: Коммунистическая партия Эстонии | Communism; Marxism-Leninism | 22 August 1991 | | |

=== Georgia ===
| Name | Native Name | Ideology | Year Banned | Notes | Reference |
|---|---|---|---|---|---|
| Communist Party of Georgia | საქართველოს კომუნისტური პარტია | Communism; Marxism-Leninism | 1991 | | |
| Centrists | ცენტრისტები | Russophilia | 2016 | Banned from election | |
| Conservative Movement | კონსერვატიული მოძრაობა | National conservatism Right-wing populism Russophilia | 2024 | Registration revoked | |
| Georgian Idea | ქართული იდეა | National conservatism Monarchism; Russophilia | 2024 | Registration revoked | |

=== Germany ===
On 14 July 1933, the Nazi Germany passed the Law Against the Formation of Parties that established the Nazi Party (NSDAP) as the de jure only political party in Germany. The Nazi Party was banned on 10 October 1945 by the Allied Control Council following the collapse of the Nazi Germany in aftermath of the Allied occupation at the end of the World War II.

| Name | Native Name(s) | Ideology | Year Banned | Notes | Reference |
|---|---|---|---|---|---|
| Communist Party of Germany | Kommunistische Partei Deutschlands | Communism; Marxism-Leninism | 6 March 1933–1945 (first ban); August 1956–present (second ban) | | |
| Social Democratic Party of Germany | Sozialdemokratische Partei Deutschlands | Social democracy | June 1933–1945 | | |
| Socialist Reich Party | Sozialistische Reichspartei Deutschlands | Neo-Nazism | 1952 | | |

=== Greece ===
Prime Minister Ioannis Metaxas banned all political parties in 1936.

Golden Dawn was ruled as a criminal organization in 2020. It was the first party banned in Greece since the end of the Greek junta in 1974. A law passed in 2023 prohibiting parties led by people convicted of crimes from running in elections resulted in Golden Dawn and National Party – Greeks being prohibited from the 2023 Greek legislative election.

| Name | Native Name | Ideology | Year Banned | Year Legalized | Notes | Reference |
|---|---|---|---|---|---|---|
| Communist Party of Greece | Κομμουνιστικό Κόμμα Ελλάδας | Communism; Marxism–Leninism | 1936 | 1974 | Banned by Ioannis Metaxas | |
| Golden Dawn | Χρυσή Αυγή | Neo-Nazism; Neo-Fascism | 2020 | | Ruled as a criminal organization | |
| National Party – Greeks | Εθνικό Kόμμα – Έλληνες | Neo-Fascism | 2023 | | Effectively banned | |
| National Popular Consciousness | Εθνική Λαϊκή Συνείδηση | Neo-Fascism | 2023 | | Dissolved following an effective ban | |
| Spartans | Σπαρτιάτες | Neo-Fascism | 2024 | | Banned from running | |

=== Latvia ===
In 1934, following the Latvian coup d'état, Kārlis Ulmanis assumed dictatorial powers, proclaimed a nationwide state of emergency, suspended the Constitution, dissolved all political parties and the Saeima (parliament). In 1940, following the Soviet occupation of Latvia, Communist Party of Latvia was legalized and was the single legal party in the Latvian SSR.

| Name | Native Name(s) | Ideology | Year Banned | Notes | Reference |
|---|---|---|---|---|---|
| Communist Party of Latvia | Latvijas Komunistiskā partija | Communism; Marxism-Leninism | 10 September 1991 | | |

=== Lithuania ===
All political parties except Lithuanian Nationalist Union and its allies were banned in 1936 under dictator Antanas Smetona. In early 1936, before the parliamentary election, all public organizations had to re-register with the government. Political parties, however, were not re-registered and had to close. All political parties except Communist Party of Lithuania were banned in Lithuanian SSR in 1940.

| Name | Native Name(s) | Ideology | Year Banned | Notes | Reference |
|---|---|---|---|---|---|
| Communist Party of Lithuania | Lietuvos komunistų partija | Communism; Marxism-Leninism | 1918–1940 (first ban); 23 August 1991–present (second ban) | | |
| Union of Christian Socialist Workers of the Memel Region | Lithuanian: Klaipėdos krašto krikščionių socialistų darbininkų sąjunga German: Christlich Sozialistische Arbeitsgemeinschaft des Memelgebiets | Nazism; Christian fascism | 1934 | | |

=== Luxembourg ===
During World War II political parties in Luxembourg were banned on 24 August 1940 following its occupation by Germany.

=== Moldova ===
| Name | Native name(s) | Ideology | Year banned | Notes | Reference(s) |
|---|---|---|---|---|---|
| Șor Party | | Russophilia, Hard Euroscepticism | 2023 | Banned | |
| Chance Political Party | | Russophilia, Hard Euroscepticism | 2023/2025 | Banned from running | |
| Victory (bloc) | | Russophilia, Hard Euroscepticism | 2024 | Banned from campaigning | |
| Victory (bloc) | | Russophilia, Hard Euroscepticism | 2025 | Banned from running | |
| Victory (party) | | Russophilia, Hard Euroscepticism | 2025 | Banned from running | |
| Alternative and Salvation Force of Moldova | | Russophilia, Hard Euroscepticism | 2025 | Banned from running | |
| Agrarian Party of Moldova | | Agrarianism | 2025 | Banned from running | |
| Revival Party | | Russophilia, Hard Euroscepticism | 2025 | Banned from running | |

=== Norway ===
During World War II German Reichskommissar Josef Terboven proclaimed on 25 September 1940 the deposition of Norwegian King Haakon VII and the Nygaardsvold's Cabinet, banning all political parties other than Nasjonal Samling.

=== Portugal ===
| Name | Native Name(s) | Ideology | Year Banned | Notes | Reference |
|---|---|---|---|---|---|
| Democratic Party | Partido Democrático | Republicanism; Social democracy Radicalism; Anticlericalism; Socialism (faction) | 3 June 1926 | | |
| Portuguese Communist Party | Partido Comunista Português | Communism; Marxism-Leninism | 1926–1974 | | |
| Portuguese Socialist Party | Partido Socialista Português | Socialism | March 1933 | | |
| Democratic Leftwing Republican Party | Partido Republicano Esquerdista Democrático | Democratic socialism Marxism | 1933 | | |
| National Syndicalists | Movimento Nacional Sindicalista | National syndicalism Corporatism; Social Catholicism; Anti-communism; Anti-capitalism; Clerical fascism | 1934 | | |
| Movement of Democratic Unity | Movimento de Unidade Democrática | Big tent Factions: Communism; Christian socialism Antifascism; Liberal democracy | 1948 | | |
| Portuguese National Party | Partido Nacional em Portugal | Salazarism | 1974 | | |
| Christian Democratic Party | Partido da Democracia Cristã | National conservatism Christian democracy | 1975 | Banned from the 1975 Portuguese Constituent Assembly election | |
| Reorganizing Movement of the Party of the Proletariat | Movimento Reorganizativo do Partido do Proletariado | Communism; Marxism-Leninism; Maoism | 1975 | Banned from the 1975 Portuguese Constituent Assembly election | |
| Worker–Peasant Alliance | Aliança Operário-Camponesa | Communism; Marxism-Leninism | 1975 | Banned from the 1975 Portuguese Constituent Assembly election | |
| Revolutionary Party of the Proletariat | Partido Revolucionário do Proletariado | Marxism; Guevarism; Left-wing populism | 1976 | | |

=== Ukraine ===
| Name | Native name(s) | Ideology | Year banned | Reference(s) |
|---|---|---|---|---|
| Communist Party of Ukraine (Soviet) | Комуністична партія України | Communism, Marxism–Leninism | 1991 | |
| Donetsk Republic | Донецкая республика | Russian nationalism, Donbas separatism | 2007 | |
| Eurasian Youth Union | Євразійський союз молоді | Neo-Eurasianism, Russian irredentism | 2011 | |
| Russian Unity | Русское единство | Russian nationalism, Russian irredentism | 2014 | |
| Russian Bloc | Русский блок | Russophilia, Pan-Slavism | 2014 | |
| Communist Party of the DPR | Коммунистическая партия ДНР | Communism, Donbas separatism | 2014 (de facto) | |
| New Russia Party | Партия «Новороссия» | Russian nationalism, Donbas separatism | 2014 (de facto) | |
| Communist Party of Ukraine | Комуністична партія України | Communism, Marxism–Leninism | 2015, 2022 | |
| Communist Party of Ukraine (renewed) | Комуністична партія України (оновлена) | Communism, Marxism–Leninism | 2015 | |
| Communist Party of Workers and Peasants | Комуністична партія робітників і селян | Communism, Marxism–Leninism | 2015 | |
| Opposition Platform — For Life | Опозиційна платформа — За життя | Social democracy, Regionalism, Russophilia | 2022 | |
| Opposition Bloc | Опозиційний блок | Social liberalism, Regionalism, Russophilia | 2022 | |
| Socialist Party of Ukraine | Соціалістична партія України | Social democracy, Democratic socialism | 2022 | |
| Progressive Socialist Party of Ukraine | Прогресивна соціалістична партія України | Left-wing populism, Pan-Slavism, Russophilia | 2022 | |
| Workers Party of Ukraine (Marxist–Leninist) | Робітнича партія України (марксистсько-ленінська) | Communism, Marxism–Leninism | 2022 | |
| Derzhava | Держава | Socialism, Russophilia | 2022 | |
| Union of Left Forces | Союз лівих сил | Socialism, Russophilia | 2022 | |
| Nashi | Наші | Social conservatism, Regionalism, Russophilia | 2022 | |
| Left Opposition | Ліва опозиція | Left-wing populism, Russophilia | 2022 | |
| Volodymyr Saldo Bloc | Блок Володимира Сальдо | Kherson regionalism, Russophilia | 2022 | |
| Socialists | Соціалісти | Socialism, Russophilia | 2022 | |
| One Rus | Русь Єдина | Russophilia, Putinism | 2022 | |
| Happy Ukraine | Щаслива Україна | Russophilia, Economic liberalism | 2022 | |
| Great Ukraine | Велика Україна | Socialism, Russophilia | 2022 | |
| Justice and Development | Справедливості та розвитку | Chernobyl disaster veterans' interests | 2022 | |
| Party of Shariy | Партія Шарія | Libertarianism, Russophilia | 2022 | |
| Party of Regions | Партія регіонів | Social democracy, Regionalism, Russophilia | 2023 | |
| Our Land | Наш край | Social democracy, Regionalism, Russophilia | 2024 | |

=== Poland ===
| Name | Native Name | Ideology | Year Banned | Reference |
|---|---|---|---|---|
| Polish Communist Party | Komunistyczna Partia Polski | Communism, Marxism-Leninism, Left conservatism | 2025 | |

=== Bulgaria ===
All political parties were banned in Bulgaria in 1934.

| Name | Native name(s) | Ideology | Year banned | Reference(s) |
|---|---|---|---|---|
| Ratniks | | Nazism | 1939 | |

=== Russia ===
| Name | Native name(s) | Ideology | Year banned | Reference(s) |
|---|---|---|---|---|
| Communist Party of the Soviet Union | Коммунистическая партия Советского Союза | Communism, Marxism–Leninism | 1991 | |
| Communist Party of the RSFSR | Коммунистическая партия РСФСР | Communism, Marxism–Leninism | 1991 | |
| National Salvation Front | Фронт национального спасения | Corporate Statism, Broad Anti-Yeltsinism | 1993 | |
| Russian National Unity | Русское национальное единство | Neo-Nazism | 2003 | |
| National Bolshevik Party | Национал-большевистская партия | National Bolshevism | 2007 | |
| National Socialist Society | Национал-социалистическое общество | Neo-Nazism | 2010 | |
| Slavic Union | Славянский союз | Neo-Nazism | 2010 | |
| National Socialist Worker's Party of Russia | Национал-социалистическая рабочая партия России | Neo-Nazism | 2010 | |
| People's Will Army | Армия воли народа | Left-wing nationalism, Antisemitism | 2011 | |
| Movement Against Illegal Immigration | Движение против нелегальной иммиграции | Ethnic nationalism | 2011 | |
| Russian All-National Union | Русский общенациональный союз | Orthodox nationalism | 2011 | |
| Northern Brotherhood | Северное братство | Neo-Nazism, Slavic Neopaganism | 2012 | |
| Minin and Pozharsky's People's Militia | Народное ополчение имени Минина и Пожарского | Russian nationalism, Militarism | 2015 | |
| Russians | Русские | Ethnic nationalism | 2015 | |
| Volya | Воля | Conspiracy theorism, Personalism | 2016 | |
| Artpodgotovka | Артподготовка | Populism, Civic nationalism | 2017 | |
| Course of Truth and Unity | Курсом правды и единения | Conspiracy theorism, Occultism | 2018 | |
| Bashkort | Башҡорт | Bashkir nationalism, Separatism | 2020 | |
| Nation and Freedom Committee | Комитет «Нация и свобода» | Russian ultranationalism | 2020 | |
| FBK and Navalny Headquarters | ФБК и Штабы Навального | Liberal democracy, Anti-corruption | 2021 | |
| Male State | Мужское государство | National patriarchy, Racism | 2021 | |
| Adat People's Movement | Ӏадат халкъан болам | Chechen nationalism, Separatism | 2022 | |
| All-Tatar Public Center | Бөтентатар Иҗтимагый Үзәге | Tatar nationalism, Separatism | 2022 | |
| People's Self-Defense | Народная самооборона | Anarcho-communism | 2022 | |
| Vesna | Весна | Liberal democracy | 2022 | |
| Oirat-Kalmyk People's Congress | Конгресс ойрат-калмыцкого народа | Kalmyk nationalism, Separatism | 2023 | |
| Freedom of Russia Legion | Легион «Свобода России» | Anti-Putinism, Far-right | 2023 | |
| Russian Volunteer Corps | Русский добровольческий корпус | Anti-Putinism, Far-right | 2023 | |
| Ethnic National Union | Этническое национальное объединение | Neo-Nazism | 2023 | |

=== Romania ===
Prime Minister Patriarch Miron of Romania banned all political parties in 1939.

| Name | Native name(s) | Ideology | Year banned | Reference(s) |
|---|---|---|---|---|
| Iron Guard | Garda de Fier | Fascism | 1939 | |

=== Spain ===
In 1923, following the Spanish coup d'état, the Spanish Constitution of 1876 was suspended and the political parties were abolished under the dictatorship of Miguel Primo de Rivera.

After the Nationalist victory in the Spanish Civil War in 1939, the FET y de las JONS was declared the sole legally sanctioned political party in Francoist Spain.

Batasuna was the first political party banned following the end of Francisco Franco's dictatorship.

| Name | Native name(s) | Ideology | Year banned | Reference(s) |
|---|---|---|---|---|
| Batasuna | | Basque nationalism | 2003 | |

=== Netherlands ===
| Name | Native name(s) | Ideology | Year banned | Reference(s) |
|---|---|---|---|---|
| Centre Party '86 | Centrumpartij '86 | Far right | 1998 | |

== See also ==
- Cordon sanitaire (politics)
- Australian Communist Party v Commonwealth
- 1951 Australian Communist Party ban referendum
- Freedom of association
- Nomination rules
- Political party funding
- Political prisoner

== Works cited ==
=== Books ===
- Cole, Allan; Totten, George; Uyehara, Cecil (1966). Socialist Parties In Postwar Japan. Yale University Press.
- Ginindza, Banele (1994). Sub-Saharan Africa - 'Banned' Political Parties Profiled. Foreign Broadcast Information Service.
- Metz, Helen, ed. (1992). Sudan: A Country Study (4 ed.). Federal Research Division. ISBN 0-8444-0750-X.
- Nagle, John (1970). The National Democratic Party: Right Radicalism in the Federal Republic of Germany. University of California Press. ISBN 0520016491.
- Raeper, William; Hoftun, Martin, eds. (1992). Spring Awakening: An Account of the 1990 Revolution in Nepal (4 ed.). Penguin Books. ISBN 0-670-85181-7.
- Upreti, B., ed. (1991). Nation-Building in South Asia. Vol. 2. University of Rajasthan. ISBN 81-7003-130-3.
- Wesson, Robert; Fleischer, David, eds. (1983). Brazil In Transition (4 ed.). Praeger Publishers. ISBN 0-275-91594-8.
- Nepal: Turmoil in the Himalayas. Central Intelligence Agency. 1979.

=== Journals ===
- Beinin, Joel (1987). "The Communist Movement and Nationalist Political Discourse in Nasirist Egypt". The Middle East Journal. 21 (2). Middle East Institute: 568–84. JSTOR 4327640.
- Karam, Jasem (1993). "The Embourgeoisment Thesis: The Case of Egypt". GeoJournal. 21 (2). Springer Science+Business Media: 413–416. Bibcode:1993GeoJo..29..413K. doi:10.1007/BF00807544. JSTOR 41145936.
- Sinpeng, Aim (2014). "Party Banning and the Impact on Party System Institutionalization in Thailand". Contemporary Southeast Asia. 36 (3). ISEAS – Yusof Ishak Institute: 442–66. doi:10.1355/cs36-3e. JSTOR 43281304.
- H. T. R. (1948). "The Legal Status of the Communist Party". Virginia Law Review. 34 (4). The Virginia Law Review Association: 450–456. doi:10.2307/1068966. JSTOR 1068966.
