= David Fleischer =

David Fleischer may refer to:

- Dave Fleischer (1894–1979), American filmmaker
- David Fleischer (judge), American judge
- David Fleischer (political scientist), American-Brazilian academic
