= Gair =

Gair may refer to:

== People ==
=== Politicians ===
- George Gair (1926–2015), New Zealand politician
- Thomas Ashton, 1st Baron Ashton of Hyde (1855–1933), British politician, full name Thomas Gair Ashton
- Vince Gair (1901–1980), Australian politician
  - Gair Affair, episode in Australian political life in 1974 involving Vince Gair
  - Gair Ministry, ministry of the Government of Queensland led by Vince Gair
  - Gair Park, heritage-listed park and memorial in Brisbane, Queensland, Australia; named after Vince Gair

=== Other people ===
- Anthony H. Gair (born 1948), American attorney and advocate
- Gair Allie (1931–2016), American baseball player
- Gordon Gair (1916–2009), Canadian lacrosse player
- Harry A. Gair (1894–1975), American lawyer
- James Gair (1927–2016), American linguist in South Asian linguistics
- Joanne Gair (born c. 1958), New Zealand make-up artist and body painter; daughter of George Gair
- Robert Gair, American inventor of the folding carton

== Films ==
- Gair (film), 1999 Indian film
- Gaiir, a 2009 Indian film
- Gair Kanooni, 1989 Indian film

== Other ==
- Blackledge-Gair House, a historic house in Cresskill, New Jersey, United States
- Clan Gayre, also known as Clan Gair, a Scottish clan
- Gair dance, a folk dance from Rajasthan, India
- Gair Glacier, a glacier in Victoria Land, Antarctica
- Gair Loch, a sea inlet on the North West coast of Highland, Scotland
- Gair Mesa, a tableland in Victoria Land, Antarctica
- Gair Rhydd, a student newspaper of Cardiff University
- Givar, a town in Iran
- "Lachin y Gair", a 1807 poem by Byron
