= Nomination rules =

Conditions under which a candidate or political party is entitled to stand for election

Nomination rules in elections regulate the conditions under which a candidate or political party is entitled to stand for election. The right to stand for election, right to be a candidate or passive suffrage is one part of free and fair elections. Passive suffrage is distinct from active suffrage, the right to vote. The criteria to stand as a candidate depends on the individual legal system. They may include the age of a candidate, citizenship, endorsement by a political party and profession. Laws' restrictions, such as competence or moral aptitude, can be used in a discriminatory manner. Restrictive or politically biased nomination rules can impact the civil rights of candidates, political parties, and voters and can have similar effects to political party bans or political repression.

In some jurisdictions a candidate or party must not only be nominated but also has to pass separate rules in order to be listed on the ballot paper. In the United States, this is called ballot access.

== Canada ==
Canadian citizens have a constitutional right to stand for election to the House of Commons of Canada and to the provincial legislative assemblies. A citizen does not need to be nominated by a political party to stand for election.

To be nominated as a candidate for the House of Commons, a citizen must be at least 18 years old on election day. A candidate must obtain a number of signatures from eligible voters in the riding they are standing in – normally 100 signatures, but 50 signatures are acceptable in designated remote or large ridings. A candidate does not need to live in the riding where they are nominated, but can only be nominated in one riding. The nomination requirements are set out by a federal statute, the Canada Elections Act, and administered by a federal non-partisan agency, Elections Canada.

A candidate can also seek the nomination from a registered political party to represent that party in the election. The party nomination is separate from the nomination process with Elections Canada. Each political party sets its own nomination process and runs the nomination process itself. As a general rule, only members of the party are entitled to vote in the party nomination process. At the federal level, there are rules governing contributions and spending for party nominations. If a political party is registered with Elections Canada and has nominated the candidate to represent the party, the party affiliation can be included on the ballot.

Nomination rules are similar in each of the ten provinces and three territories.

== European Union ==
EU member states may set their own rules on ballot access in elections to the European Parliament. In Denmark, Germany, Greece, Estonia, the Netherlands, Sweden, and the Czech Republic, candidates must be nominated by political parties. In the other member states, a specified number of signatures is needed. In the Netherlands and the United Kingdom (pre-Brexit), a deposit is required as well as signatures. In the Republic of Ireland, candidates may be nominated either by a registered political party or by 60 members of the relevant electorate. The right to stand as a candidate at elections to the European Parliament and municipal elections is in Article 39 and Article 40 of the Charter of Fundamental Rights of the European Union.

The Convention on the Participation of Foreigners in Public Life at Local Level has extended the right to stand for local elections to non-citizens in some cases.

== France ==
Candidates for the office of President of the Republic require 500 signatures of elected individuals (mayors, MPs, regional councillors).

They must not be disqualified, which may occur as judicial punishment.

== Italy ==
In municipal elections, candidates must post a petition undersigned by a number of registered voters, the amount of signatures required depending on the population of the municipality.

== Singapore ==
Elections in Singapore comes under two different types, one that elects the Members of the Parliament of Singapore and one for the President of Singapore, and both types of elections have different rules on how a candidate is entitled to stand for election, as well as the eligibility to vote, per the Constitution of Singapore.

For both elections, voters and candidates must be Singaporeans per the nationality law, and are aged 21 or above with their names must be present from the current register of electors at the latest revision of electorates, usually occurring months before the writ of election is being issued. Candidates are not allowed to run if the candidate is subjected to any of the disqualification clause specified in Article 45 of the Constitution (such as conviction or undischarged bankruptcy), or if the name is absent from the register if the voter did not vote on polling day, as the Constitution enforce compulsory voting.

For parliamentary elections, candidates are eligible under the Parliamentary Elections Act 1954 with an minimum age of 21 and can represent in any political party, by itself or as a team. For presidential elections, candidates are eligible under the Presidential Elections Act 1991, with an minimum age of 45 but they must stand as an independent candidate, as the President should not be affiliated to any political party at the time. An additional service requirement relating to public sector or private sector (under the Amended Constitution 2016 (28) as of 1 April 2017) must also be satisfied.

== Sweden ==
Candidates for election to the European Parliament, the Riksdag, county councils or municipal councils stand on the ballots of their respective parties. Parties can have one or several lists. The so-called "free right of nomination" (fri nomineringsrätt) means that if a party has not protected its party label, anyone can set up a ballot for that party. This means that people could be elected for a party who do not have the support of the people behind the party. To avoid this, the party must apply for a protected label. There are no regulations for how a party whose party label isn't protected must be organised. Forming a party or running in the election is thus comparatively easy, and there have been occasions where a single individual has put up dozens of different ballots with various more or less frivolous names and himself as the only candidate. Parties pay for their own ballots unless they have received more than 1 percent of the vote in one of the last two Riksdag elections, in which case the Elections Authority pays. (Further, parties that have received more than 1 percent of the vote in one of the last two elections to the European Parliament get their ballots paid for in European elections as well.) The Elections Authority makes sure, however, that there are blank ballots where voters can write in the name of the party they want to vote for.

To be given a protected label, a party must have a constitution, a board, and must decide on its name and on applying for protected label status with the Swedish Central Elections Authority. It must also appoint someone to act on its behalf when presenting the application to the Elections Authority. These decisions must be laid down in a protocol. It must also require a number of signatures from eligible voters: 50 for municipal elections, 150 for county council elections, and 1,500 for elections to the Riksdag or the European Parliament. Finally, the name of the party must not be too close to the name of an already protected party label in order to avoid confusion.

A party with a protected label is protected against ballots with party labels that are confusingly similar to the party's own, or ballots with other candidates than those the party reports. (This does not hold for other areas than the one where the party is running - hence there can be and there are completely separate parties with the same name in different municipalities and county councils.) In return, it must ensure that its candidates have agreed in writing to run for the party.

== Turkey ==
Article 36 of the Law on Political Parties, as amended in 2021 by Law No. 7393, stipulates that in order to participate in elections: political parties must have established an organization in at least half of Turkey’s provinces, must have held their grand congresses at least six months before the voting day, and must have held their district, provincial and grand congresses twice in a row.

== United Kingdom ==
The following are the basic nomination rules for an individual candidate (whether Independent, or associated with a political party). To use a party name (and logo) a candidate must be authorised by a registered political party, or else they may stand as 'Independent' or with no description.

A candidate for election to the United Kingdom Parliament, Scottish Parliament, Senedd or Northern Ireland Assembly requires the signed assent of ten registered electors, plus an election deposit of £500, which is forfeited if the candidate wins less than 5% of the vote.

A candidate for local government office does not need to pay a deposit (except for mayoral elections, for which the deposit is £500), but needs the assent of either two registered electors (for parish or town elections) or ten registered electors (for all other local elections).

== United States ==
Ballot access rules vary widely in the U.S.

Sex has never been a requirement for holding elective national office under the U.S. Constitution, as it was in the case of other countries. Though women could not vote in federal elections before Wyoming's statehood in 1890 (with the exception of propertied women in New Jersey until 1807), there was no constitutional barrier to their serving in the House of Representatives, or in the Presidency or the Vice Presidency. This would be an instance of passive suffrage, albeit never taken advantage of.

== See also ==
- Deplatforming
- Electoral competition
- List of banned political parties
- Non-human electoral candidate
- Nuisance candidate
- Opposition (politics)
- Political censorship
- Political party funding
- Political prisoner
- Regulatory capture
- Term limit
