= Owen Donohoe =

American politician from Kansas (1945–2026)

Member of the Kansas House of Representatives from the 39th district
- In office January 8, 2007 – January 14, 2013
- Preceded by: Ray Cox
- Succeeded by: Charles Macheers
- In office January 14, 2019 – March 13, 2024
- Preceded by: Shelee Brim
- Succeeded by: Angela Stiens

Personal details
- Born: February 13, 1945
- Died: February 8, 2026 (aged 80)
- Party: Republican
- Children: 5

Owen Donohoe (pronounced /dɑːnəhu/; February 13, 1945 – February 8, 2026) was an American politician from the state of Kansas. He served as a Republican member of the Kansas House of Representatives, representing the 39th district from 2007 to 2013, and again from 2019 to 2024.

Donohoe moved to Kansas in 1989 to start his own medical device company, Donohoe and Associates. He has been married for 59 years and has five children and 16 grandchildren. On February 20, 2024, he announced his resignation effective March 13, 2024.

Donohoe died on February 8, 2026, at the age of 80.

== Issue positions ==
Donohoe described himself as a "fiscal conservative, for limited government, a strong proponent of individual property rights, and 'pro-life'".

== Committee membership ==
- Economic Development and Tourism (Vice-Chair)
- Appropriations Committee
- General Government Budget
- Taxation Committee
- Education Committee
- Economic Development and Tourism Committee (Vice-Chair)
- Aging and Long Term Care
- Joint Economic Committee
