= Non-citizen suffrage =

Voting rights for non-citizens

Non-citizen suffrage occasionally alien suffrage (US; archaic) is the enfranchisement of non-citizen residents in municipal, regional, or national elections. This right varies widely by region, though there has been a trend over the last 30 years to enfranchise more non-citizens, especially in Europe.

== Arguments ==
Non-citizen suffrage can improve political participation. Democracies are widely believed to function better when more people vote, so the wisdom of the crowd can help make more fully informed choices. Examples in New York, Chicago, and Maryland have all shown positive results after immigrants were allowed to vote in local elections, such as school boards.

Universal suffrage means "One Person One Vote", so if immigrants cannot travel to the country of their citizenship (Right of return) or do not have either non-resident citizen voting rights or non-citizen suffrage, the ethics and the legitimacy of the democratic process has been called into question. Non-citizen suffrage can help non-citizens to export the democratic best-practices to their home country.

Non-citizen suffrage creates dual transnational voting which violates political egalitarianism and "One man, one vote" slogan. Emigrants can vote in their home country by travelling or through non-resident citizen voting.

Donations by non-citizens to political campaigns from foreign sources is criticized by some as foreign electoral intervention.

For this reason many nations restrict the ability of Non-citizens to contribute to campaigns.

Michael Bloomberg argued in an op-ed on NYC's Non-citizen enfranchisement, that it "[…]devalues citizenship." by removing a major incentive for acquiring citizenship, stating: "Voting is a major reason many immigrants seek to obtain citizenship. […] stripping away that incentive won’t help." Wishing more immigrants to become citizens; arguing that the route to "[…] citizenship is too slow and too restrictive."

== By region ==
David C. Earnest surveyed the practice of voting rights for resident non-citizens, concluding that the practice is widespread and the details varied considerably from country to country. In another 2003 paper, Earnest compared voting rights for resident non-citizens in 25 democracies, grouping them into six categories as follows:

- 0: No rights (Australia by grandfathered franchise after 1984, Austria, Belgium, Costa Rica, Denmark before 1977, Finland before 1981, France, Germany except for 1989–90, Greece, Ireland before 1962, Italy, Japan, the Netherlands before 1979, Norway before 1978, Spain before 1985, Sweden before 1976, the United Kingdom before 1949, and the United States before 1968).
- 1: Rights granted only by sub-national governments (Canada from 1975 to the present; West Germany in 1989, the Netherlands from 1979 to 1981, Switzerland from 1960 to the present, and the United States from 1968 to the present).
- 2: Local rights, discriminatory (Denmark from 1977 to 1980; Finland from 1981 to 1990; Israel from 1960 to the present; and Norway from 1978 to 1981).
- 3: National rights, discriminatory (Australia from 1960 to 1984, Canada from 1960 to 1974, Ireland from 1985 to the present, New Zealand from 1960 to 1974, Portugal, the United Kingdom).
- 4: Local rights, nondiscriminatory (Denmark after 1980, Finland after 1990, Hungary, Ireland 1963 to 1984, the Netherlands after 1981, Norway after 1981, Spain after 1985, Sweden after 1976).
- 5: National rights, nondiscriminatory (New Zealand after 1975; Uruguay for 15-year residents, since 1952/1934; Chile since 1980; Malawi since 1994; Ecuador since 2008)

In some countries, some administrative divisions have granted voting rights to non-citizens. Other countries have granted voting rights to non-citizens who hold citizenship of a country which is a fellow member of a supranational organization (e.g. members of the European Union). In a few cases, countries or other governmental entities grant voting rights to citizens and non-citizens alike.

=== Supranational groupings ===
A number of separate supranational groupings of countries exist, and membership in some of these groupings may involve multinational agreements and treaties in which member countries agree to some degree of reciprocity regarding voting rights. Some individual countries are members of more than one supranational grouping, and some supranational groupings of countries are members of other supranational groupings of countries.

==== European Union (EU) ====
Map of resident non-EU foreigners' local election voting rights in Europe, with countries colored accordingly: Countries according right to vote to every resident non-EU foreigner without limit of time of residence Countries according right to vote to every resident non-EU foreigner which resides in the country for a certain time Countries according right to vote to non-EU foreigners from certain countries on a reciprocity basis. Countries according right to vote to non-EU foreigners from certain countries on a reciprocity basis, but for which, in practice, no such reciprocity agreement has been made with any country. Countries according right to vote to non-EU foreigners from the Commonwealth. Countries from the European Union which do not give the right to vote to non-EU foreigners Switzerland (non-EU member): right to vote granted to non-EU foreigners in some cantons and semi-cantons and not in others. Countries which do not give the right to vote to foreigners

The 1992 Maastricht Treaty imposed reciprocity inside the European Union concerning voting rights in local elections; this already existed for the European elections. In several European states, the public debate on the right of foreigners to vote was therefore renewed, as some foreign residents had the right to vote (European foreign residents), while others, non-Europeans, did not. As a result of this debate, Luxembourg, Lithuania, Slovenia and Belgium extended the right to vote, in different manners, to all foreign residents (which was already the case in Sweden, Denmark, Finland and the Netherlands).

The European Parliament, the Council of Europe and the Baltic Sea States Conference have produced various recommendations in favor of the introduction of the right to vote and of eligibility to all foreign residents in local elections. The 1992 Convention on the Participation of Foreigners in Public Life at Local Level, a treaty by the Council of Europe, came into force in 1997 and is open for member-states to ratify. Then there is the Council Directive 94/80/EC from the 19th of December 1994 defining to which political organs other EU citizen can vote.

==== Commonwealth of Nations ====
The Commonwealth of Nations, usually known as the Commonwealth and formerly as the British Commonwealth, is a voluntary association of 54 independent sovereign states, most of which are former colonies of the British Empire. A few Commonwealth countries, including the United Kingdom itself, allow Commonwealth citizens (formerly "British subjects") voting or eligibility rights at all levels, either with or without specific restrictions not applying to local citizens: Antigua and Barbuda, Barbados, Belize, Dominica, Grenada, Guyana, Jamaica, Malawi (all foreign residents, not only Commonwealth citizens), Mauritius, Namibia (all foreign residents, not only Commonwealth citizens), New Zealand (all foreign residents, before 1975 only Commonwealth citizens), Saint Kitts and Nevis, Saint Lucia, Saint Vincent and the Grenadines.

=== Antigua and Barbuda ===
Commonwealth citizens may vote and are eligible for parliamentary elections, but "allegiance to a foreign State" is a criterion for ineligibility.

=== Argentina ===
Though foreign residents cannot vote in national elections (president and vice–president and national legislators), they can vote in provinces which have legislation to allow foreigners to vote in provincial/municipal elections. To exercise this right it is a preliminary requirement to know the corresponding provincial legislation. Nevertheless, in all cases it is mandatory for the foreign resident to count with a National Identity Document (DNI) and to be enrolled in a special register set up for that purpose.

Article 61 of the Constitution of the city of Buenos Aires states that "Suffrage is free, equal, secret, universal, compulsory and not accumulative. The foreign residents enjoy this right, with the correlative obligations, on equal terms with Argentine citizens registered in this district, in the terms established by the law."

In 2012, there was a law proposal by the government to grant voting rights for all elections to legal foreign residents, as in Chile and Uruguay but with a residency requirement of 2 years. It was presented by Justicialist Party senators Aníbal Fernández and Elena Corregido. A similar proposal had been rejected by the National Congress in 1890, reportedly due to concerns for anarchist and socialist immigrants.

=== Australia ===
All British subjects who were enrolled to vote in Australia before 26 January 1984 retain voting rights at federal and state elections in Australia. As of that date, the right of other British subjects to enrol to vote was abolished. A right to vote has been grandfathered: a British subject who was enrolled to vote before 26 January 1984 can re-enrol at any time, even if his/her enrolment has lapsed subsequently for any reason. British subjects on the electoral roll, like all other people enrolled to vote in Australia, are subject to compulsory voting. The term "British subject" not only includes British citizens, but citizens of other countries in the Commonwealth of Nations resident in Australia, such as New Zealand.

In most cases, local government electoral rolls in Australia are open to all adults, including non-citizens, who meet other criteria – such as residency requirements.

Before 26 January 1949, people born in Australia were known under Australian law as "British subjects", and there was no legal distinction between them and other British subjects. From 1949, anyone born in Australia was officially termed an Australian citizen, although British subjects retained voting rights in Australia.

=== Austria ===
(EU member) In 2002, non-citizens were granted voting rights in state elections in Vienna, but the decision was overturned by the Constitutional Court in June 2004. EU nationals may vote and stand for office in local elections (in Vienna only at borough level, because Vienna is a state of Austria and the Gemeinderat and Landtag of Vienna both consist of the same members).

=== Barbados ===
As of 1990, Commonwealth citizens may vote for parliamentary elections with a 3 years residency requirement.

=== Belgium ===
(EU member) European Union residents in Belgium were given the right to vote and to be candidates for the 1994 European Parliament election, then for the 2000 municipal elections. At first they only had the right to be elected as municipal councillors, not as members of the executive (schepen/alderman or burgomaster/mayor); from the 2006 municipal elections they could access the function of alderman; they still cannot access the function of mayor, because it includes responsibility for the local police force. In accordance with EU regulations, EU residents are subject to the same residence conditions as Belgian nationals, i.e. residence in the commune at the closure date of the electoral roll (July 31 for the municipal elections).

In 2004, voting rights in municipal elections were extended to non-European Union foreigners living in Belgium, with certain conditions attached. Non-EU foreigners must have been living in Belgium for at least five years before becoming entitled to vote. Any non-EU foreigner who wants to take advantage of the new legislation must also sign an oath of allegiance to the Belgian constitution, formally agree to respect the country's laws and sign the European Convention on Human Rights. Also, non-EU foreigners are not allowed to stand as candidates.

As voting is compulsory in Belgium, and all electors are automatically on the electoral rolls (extracted from a computerized National Register), foreign residents have to register voluntarily on the electoral roll, and only then are they subject to the obligation to vote.

Election year	Potential EU voters	Registered EU voters	Potential non-EU voters	Registered non-EU voters
2000	498,315	17.6% (87,858)	-	-
2006	529,878	20.9% (110,973)	108,607	15.7% (17,065)
2012	653,958	18.5% (120,826)	146,721	14% (20,571)
2018	748,267	17% (130,559)	194,593	15% (29,557)

=== Belize ===
Commonwealth citizens who are domiciled or have resided in the country for at least one year immediately before polling day are qualified as electors, but not for eligibility to the House of Representatives, which requires Belize citizenship.

=== Bolivia ===
In 1994, the constitution was changed to allow non-citizens to vote in local elections. As of 2007, this has not been implemented.

=== Brazil ===
Article 12.1 of the 1988 Brazilian Constitution states that "The rights inherent to Brazilians (before 1994 Constitutional amendment, "born Brazilians") shall be attributed to Portuguese citizens permanently resident in Brazil if Brazilians are afforded reciprocal treatment, except in the events set forth in this Constitution.", article 14 that "Foreigners cannot register as voters", and "The conditions for eligibility, according to the law, are the following: I. Brazilian nationality (...)". A Treaty of friendship, cooperation and consultation between Brazil and Portugal was signed on April 22, 2000 and promulgated in 2001 by Decree nr. 3.927/2001. Practically, the Portuguese citizen regularly residing in Brazil and wishing to enjoy the "Equality Status" (Estatuto de Igualdade) without losing his original citizenship has to apply to the Ministry of Justice. The conditions to enjoy political rights are: to be residing in Brazil for 3 years, to be able to read and write Portuguese and to enjoy political rights in Portugal.

=== Bulgaria ===
(EU member) In February 2005, the Bulgarian Constitution was modified, an article 42, a third paragraph was added to Article 42, stating "The elections for the European Parliament and the participation of European Union citizens in the elections for local authorities shall be regulated by law".

=== Canada ===
Voting rights at the federal level in Canada are exclusively limited to Canadian citizens. The same is true for almost all provincial and municipal elections.

==== British Columbia ====
The 1984 Election Amendment Act (Bill 20) made British subjects who are not also Canadian citizens no longer allowed to register to vote in British Columbia.

==== New Brunswick ====
For the 1995 New Brunswick provincial elections, a person qualified to vote had to be a Canadian citizen or a British subject who was resident in the province prior to January 1, 1979. For the 1999 elections, the qualification was limited to Canadian citizens.

==== Nova Scotia ====
For the 2003 and 2006 provincial elections in Nova Scotia, to be eligible to vote, a person had still to be either a Canadian citizen or a British subject. On November 25, 2001, an amendment to the Elections Act removed being a British subject as a qualification for registration as an elector but provided that this change would not be effective until the second general election that was to be held after this amendment came into force.

==== Ontario ====
The 1985 Equality Rights Statute Law Amendment Act put an end to municipal and school board elections voting rights for British citizens in Ontario. Those who could vote before the Act kept their voting rights up to July 1, 1988, the legal waiting period for the introduction of a request for naturalization.

In 1971, councillor Joe Piccininni proposed allowing non-citizens who owned property in Toronto to cast ballots. In 2013, the Toronto City Council asked the province to allow permanent residents who aren't yet citizens to vote in local elections. It would have included the right to vote in any municipal election, including choosing the mayor, city council and school board officials.

==== Saskatchewan ====
British subjects (other than Canadian citizens) are entitled to vote if they were qualified electors at the time of the Saskatchewan provincial general election held on June 23, 1971.

=== Cape Verde ===
Article 24 of the Cape Verde Constitution states that

- alinea 3.: "Rights not conferred to foreigners and apatrids may be attributed to citizens of countries with Portuguese as an official language, except for access to functions of sovereignty organs, service in the armed forces or in the diplomatic career."
- alinea 4. "Active and passive electoral capacity can be attributed by law to foreigners and apatrids residents on the national territory for the elections of the members of the organs of the local municipalities."

The website of the governmental Institute of Cape Verde Communities states that such a measure was adopted "to stimulate reciprocity from host countries of Cape Verdian migrants".

A law nr. 36/V/97 was promulgated on August 25, 1997, regulating the "Statute of Lusophone Citizen", concerning nationals from any country member of the Community of Portuguese Language Countries (article 2), stating in its article 3 that "The lusophone citizen with residence in Cape Verde is recognized the active and passive electoral capacity for municipal elections, under conditions of the law. The lusophone citizen with residence in Cape Verde has the right to exercise political activity related to his electoral capacity.".

=== Chile ===
The 1980 Chilean Constitution states in its article 14 that "Foreigners residing in Chile for more than five years and who comply with the requirements prescribed in the first paragraph of Article 13, may exercise the right to vote in the cases and in the manner determined by law.". Article 13 states that "Citizens are those Chileans who have reached the age of eighteen years and who have never been sentenced to afflictive punishment.". A 2005 constitutional reform introduced a second line to article 14, by which eligibility rights of naturalized citizens to run for office only occur 5 years after being granted a naturalization card.

=== Colombia ===
In 1991, the constitution was changed to allow noncitizens to vote in local elections, but the changes were not immediately implemented. On July 31, 2006, Colombia approved voting by foreigners for mayors and city council elections. To vote, foreigners must have been residents of Colombia for 5 years and must register with the electoral authorities. Voting is not compulsory and voting aliens have the same voting-related privileges citizens would.

=== Cyprus ===
(EU and CN member) Article 8 of the 2004 Local Elections Act (Nationals of Other Member States) (Ν.98(Ι)/2004) allows EU residents to vote at local elections. Voters have to register, once registered they are submitted to compulsory voting like Cyprus citizens. EU voters may not stand for election as mayor or chairman of the council and, if elected to the local council, they may not hold the office of deputy mayor or deputy chairman. Article 9(2) of the 2004 Law on Election of Members to the European Parliament (N.10(I)/2004) allows EU residents to vote and be candidate at the European Parliament elections.

=== Czech Republic ===
(EU member) In December 2001, voting rights in local elections were approved for "any natural person who has reached the age of 18, is a citizen of a foreign country and has permanent residence registered in the municipality, if an international treaty by which the Czech Republic is bound and which has been promulgated so stipulates." In November 2002, only EU nationals benefited from such a treaty. An Act on elections to the European Parliament was adopted in March 2003.

=== Denmark ===
(EU member) Voting and eligibility rights were granted to Nordic Passport Union country citizens with a 3 years residence condition for municipal and county elections in 1977. These rights were extended to all foreign residents in 1981. In 1995, the 3 years residence requirement was abolished for EU residents, in conformity with the European legislation, and also for Nordic residents.

=== Dominica ===
Commonwealth citizens may vote for parliamentary elections. They are not eligible for direct elections to the House of Assembly, but may be appointed or elected as senators (9 members of the parliament who may either be appointed by the president or elected by the other members of the House of Assembly). "Allegiance to a foreign State" is a criterion for ineligibility.

=== Estonia ===
(EU member) Article 156 of the 1992 Estonian Constitution states that "Any person who has reached the age of 18 and resides permanently in the territory of that local government will have the right to vote in accordance with the Constitution and the law.". In 1996, all foreign residents were granted voting, but not eligibility, rights, for municipal elections with a 5 years residence condition. In March 2002, a new Local Government Elections Act was adopted to conform with European legislation, granting EU residents the same voting and eligibility rights for municipal elections.

=== Finland ===
(EU member) Voting and eligibility rights were granted to Nordic Passport Union country citizens without residence condition for municipal elections in 1981. These rights were extended to all foreign residents in 1991 with a 2 years residence condition. In 1995 (Law 365/95, confirmed by Electoral Law 714/1998), the residence requirement was abolished for EU residents, in conformity with the European legislation. Section 14, al. 2 of the 2000 Constitution of Finland states that "Every Finnish citizen and every foreigner permanently resident in Finland, having attained eighteen years of age, has the right to vote in municipal elections and municipal referendums, as provided by an Act. Provisions on the right to otherwise participate in municipal government are laid down by an Act."

=== France ===
(EU member) EU residents have voting and eligibility rights for local and European elections.

In France, the Socialist Party has discussed extending the right to vote to foreigners since the early 1980s (it was the 80th proposition of the 110 Propositions for France electoral program of 1981), but as it needed a Constitutional change it was felt that it would have been blocked by the Senate. The alternative would have been a referendum, but as it was generally assumed that a majority of the public opinion was against it, it could have resulted in a defeat of the government. On May 3, 2000, a bill was voted on by the National Assembly by the Left and 2 centrist Union for French Democracy deputies, but it was blocked by the Senate.

Polls taken in 2012 suggested that a majority of the public opinion was still opposed to it, even though Nicolas Sarkozy and a few other prominent right-wing politicians like Philippe Séguin (candidate to the mayorship of Paris in 2001) Gilles de Robien and Jean-Louis Borloo have stated publicly that they personally supported it, but that they would respect the overwhelming opposition to it within their own parties. In January 2006 left-wing senators again tried to put the bill to allow foreigners to vote on the agenda, but the right-wing majority again blocked it.

In the late 1990s-early 2000s, some symbolic local referendums on the subject were organized either under the auspices of the Ligue des droits de l'homme or of the municipal authorities, one of them in Saint-Denis, at the initiative of the Communist Party mayor. The Cergy administrative court ruled in 2006 that the referendums were not legally binding. Other communist or socialist-led municipalities organized such referendums, including Le Blanc-Mesnil (PCF), Bondy (PS), Stains (PCF), La Courneuve (PCF) and Aubervilliers (PCF).

=== Germany ===
==== East Germany ====
During the May 1989 and May 1990 local government elections in East Germany, all foreigners who had resided lawfully in the country for two years had the right to vote. While the 1989 election took place under the regime of the Socialist Unity Party (SED) and is proven to have been massively falsified by the state, the 1990 elections were the first (and only) free local government elections of East Germany. Voting rights for foreigners in the 1990 election were established by § 3 para. 2 of the Law on the Elections to District Councils, City Councils, City District Councils and Municipal Councils on 6 May 1990, and was later also transcribed into the May 1990 Municipal Code as § 13 para. 2 sentence 2. While that Municipal Code was still applicable in the five eastern German states following German reunification, the specific section about foreigner voting rights was struck down by the 1990 Federal Constitutional Court ruling.

==== West Germany ====
In February 1989, the state of Schleswig-Holstein approved local voting rights for Danish, Irish, Norwegian, Dutch, Swedish, and Swiss 5-year residents; the state of Hamburg approved local voting for 8-year residents. Both were struck down as unconstitutional by the Federal Constitutional Court of Germany on October 31, 1990 (Ruling 83, 37), which interpreted article 28 of the Basic Law to mean only German citizen residents in the territory of that administrative unit, when it stated that "the people" must be represented by election in districts and municipalities.

==== United Germany ====
(EU member)

Between 1995 and 1999, all states were compelled to change their legislation in order to comply with the December 19, 1994 94/80/CE EU directive regarding voting and eligibility rights for EU residents in local and district elections.

In 1998, the coalition government between the social-democrats and the Greens for the first Schröder cabinet including voting rights for all residents at the municipal and district level, but the opposition led a campaign for the February 7, 1999 regional elections in the state of Hesse against both the planned reform of the German nationality law and prospective noncitizen voting rights and won these elections. As a result of their majority in the federal Upper House, the legislation was blocked and the government adopted a less expansive reform of the nationality law.

=== Greece ===
(EU member) EU residents have voting and eligibility rights for local and European elections.

In 2010, these rights were extended for local elections to non-EU foreigners. 12,762 foreign residents out of a potential electorate of 266,250 actually registered to vote for the November 2010 local elections.

=== Grenada ===
Commonwealth citizens may vote and are eligible for parliamentary elections, but "allegiance to a foreign State" is a criterion for ineligibility.

=== Guyana ===
Commonwealth citizens with domicile and residence in Guyana for a period of at least one year (same condition apply to Guyanese citizens) may vote but the Guyanese citizenship is required for eligibility to the National Assembly.

=== Hong Kong ===
Voting is a relatively recent right in Hong Kong, initiated only towards the end of the British colonial period (1842–1997) and enlarged somewhat after handover. For this territory, the right to vote accompanies a person's permanent resident status in Hong Kong, not their citizenship.

The right of Hong Kong permanent residents to vote is guaranteed in Article 26 of the Basic Law, where nationality is not even mentioned. And as stipulated in Article 24, permanent residents include foreign persons who have taken up permanent residency in Hong Kong for more than 7 years and other persons (regardless of nationality) who have right of abode in Hong Kong only.

While voting by persons holding foreign passports has gone largely unchallenged, there is some indication that increasing appeals to patriotism may make non-citizen voting an issue of debate in the future. For those who are permanent residents of the territory but not concurrently citizens of the People's Republic of China, their permanent residency will be lost if they stay outside Hong Kong for more than 3 years.

=== Hungary ===
(EU member) In 1990, permanent residents were allowed to vote in local elections. This was revised in 2004 to limit non-citizen voting to EU nationals.

=== Iceland ===
Voting and eligibility rights were granted to Nordic Passport Union country citizens with a 3 years residence condition for municipal elections in 1986. These rights were extended to all foreign residents in 2002 with a 5 years residence condition.

=== Ireland ===
Resident citizenship	Local elections	European elections	General (national) elections	Presidential elections	Referendums
Irish	Yes	Yes	Yes	Yes	Yes
British	Yes	No	Yes	No	No
EU	Yes	Yes	No	No	No
Non-British, Non-EU	Yes	No	No	No	No

(EU member) On April 18, 2008, Conor Lenihan, the Minister for Integration, announced that full voting rights including for the President and Dáil Éireann would be extended to all EU migrants.

=== Israel ===
In 1960, non-citizen voting rights in local elections were granted for holders of a permanent resident card ("blue card"). Most permanent residents, a status created by the 1952 Entry into Israel Law, are migrants, but other groups fall into the same category.

Following the 1967 annexation of East Jerusalem, Israel conducted a census on June 26, 1967, in the annexed territory and granted permanent Israeli residency to those present at the time of the census (those not present lost the right to reside in Jerusalem). They can still vote in municipal elections and play a role in the administration of the city. At the end of 2005, 93% of the Arab population of East Jerusalem had permanent residency and 5% had Israeli citizenship. In February 2019, the government took steps to facilitate the process for Arab permanent residents of Jerusalem to become citizens of Israel.

In the annexed Golan Heights, out of nearly 27,000 Golan Druzes, 17,000 can vote but only about 5,000 are Israeli citizens, the remainder hold Syrian citizenship and have the status of permanent residents which allows them to vote for municipal elections, but until 2018 there were only appointed representatives to local councils in the Golan's four Druze villages. When the first municipal elections held there took place on 30 October 2018, they were the target of a boycott campaign supported e.g. by the local Druze High Religious Council.

=== Italy ===
(EU member) EU residents have voting and eligibility rights for municipal (and inframunicipal) and European elections.

The debate about the extension of local voting rights to non-EU residents (extracomunitari) resurfaces from time to time. A proposition included in the programme of the Prodi I Cabinet in 1997 had to be withdrawn because of the opposition from the Commission for Constitutional Affairs. Although the parties that support the Berlusconi governments oppose this extension, Gianfranco Fini, leader of the post-fascist National Alliance, supported it e.g. in 2004 and 2008, when he was president of the Chamber of Deputies.

There are some elective local consultative council for foreigners, notably in Rome, and since 2005 several municipal councils voted motions asking for the extension of voting rights to non-EU residents.

=== Jamaica ===
Commonwealth citizens may vote and are eligible for parliamentary elections, with a condition of residency in the country during 12 months prior to the compilation of the register of electors (only for British Commonwealth citizens), but "allegiance to a foreign State" is a criterion for ineligibility.

=== Japan ===
Currently the Constitution of Japan defines voting rights as only for citizens. In 1990, some permanent residents from Korea (see "Koreans in Japan") petitioned the Supreme Court to gain voting rights. The Supreme Court declined in 1995, but it also declared that it is not prohibited to do so. In addition, one of justices expressed the opinion that the foreigners should be guaranteed the voting right at local elections.

During the 2009 Japanese general election, it appeared that the New Komeito Party, the Japanese Communist Party and the Social Democratic Party were clearly in favor of extending local voting rights to foreign residents, while the Liberal Democratic Party was totally opposed to it and the Democratic Party of Japan was divided on this matter, but rather in favor of the extension of voting rights, so gaining the support of the Korean Residents Union in Japan (Mindan) for many of its candidates.

Following the victory of the Democratic Party in the 2009 Japanese general election, the topic of giving the nearly one million permanent residents of Japan the right to vote in local elections was pushed by some party members.

In 2022, a city assembly in Musashino, Tokyo voted against a proposal to extended local voting rights to permanent residents.

=== Jersey ===
The right to vote in Jersey is determined by residency, not citizenship, citizens of any state may vote in Jersey elections provided they fulfill the other requirements for electoral registration. A person is entitled to have his or her name included on the electoral register for an electoral district if the person 1) has been ordinarily resident in Jersey for a period of at least 2 years, 2) or ordinarily resident in Jersey for a period of at least 6 months, as well as having been ordinarily resident in Jersey at any time for an additional period of, or for additional periods that total, at least 5 years.

=== Lithuania ===
(EU member) In 2002, non-national permanent residents were granted local voting rights. In order to achieve this, an amendment to the constitution was adopted in June 2002 and an amendment of the Law on elections to municipal councils was adopted in September 2002. A Law on elections to the European Parliament was adopted by the parliament in November 2003. Other permanent residents of the respective administrative units can vote.

=== Luxembourg ===
(EU member) In 2003, local voting rights were granted, with no nationality restrictions, to all foreigners who have been resident in Luxembourg for at least 5 years on the date on which electoral registration closes (around 3 months before the election itself). On 7 June 2015, a referendum was held on whether to grant the right to vote in national elections to foreigners resident in the country for more than 10 years. The proposal was overwhelmingly rejected, by 78% to 22%. The result was met with dismay by foreign residents, who make up almost 50% of Luxembourg's population, meaning that around half of adult residents in the country are unable to vote.

=== Malawi ===
Non-citizens who have been ordinarily resident in Malawi for seven years may vote for parliamentary elections, but only Malawi citizens are eligible to stand.

=== Malaysia ===
Article 119 of the Constitution of Malaysia effective as of 2010 defines voting rights as only for citizens.

There have been over the years several allegations of massive illegal voting by aliens organized by the leading party UMNO, e.g. in Kuala Lumpur in 2011 and at several elections in Sabah since the 1990s, where these false-document-holding illegals who vote are called "phantom voters".

=== Malta ===
(EU and CN member) Since 1993, United Kingdom residents in Malta enjoy the same voting and eligibility rights as Maltese citizens at the local and regional council elections. A Bill to make provision for participation of EU citizens to local elections and a Bill to make provision for holding of elections to the European Parliament were adopted in November 2003.

=== Mauritius ===
Commonwealth citizens may vote and are eligible for parliamentary elections, with a condition of residence in Mauritius for not less than two years or domiciled in the country on a prescribed date (also compulsory for Mauritius citizens), but "allegiance to a State outside the Commonwealth" is a criterion for ineligibility and "ability to speak and read English with a degree of proficiency sufficient to allow for taking an active part in Assembly proceedings" is a condition of eligibility.

=== Morocco ===
On 17 December 2008, after a Spanish-Moroccan summit, the Moroccan Prime Minister Abbas El Fassi declared that his government was "studying" the possibility to grant voting rights for municipal elections to foreign residents in Morocco.

The new Moroccan Constitution adopted in July 2011 includes in its article 30 this possibility: "Foreigners enjoy the fundamental freedoms recognized to the Moroccan citizens, according to the law. Those who reside in Morocco can take part at local elections according to law, application of international conventions or reciprocity practices."

=== Namibia ===
Voting and eligibility requirements include citizenship of Namibia (by birth) or child of at least one parent born in Namibia or residence in the country for at least 4 years prior to the date of registration as elector.

=== Netherlands ===
(EU member) In 1979 non-citizens were allowed to vote in local elections in Rotterdam. This was expanded nationwide in 1985 (though necessary reforms meant aliens did not vote in local elections until 1986). Residents without Dutch nationality are not allowed to vote in national elections, only in municipal elections. Aliens holding a passport from a European country are allowed to vote in European elections.

=== New Zealand ===
National voting rights were granted in 1853 to all British subjects who met the other qualifications (e.g. property), to some non-citizens from 1960 to 1974, and to all permanent residents from 1975 onwards, see History of voting in New Zealand. However, permanent residents cannot gain election to parliament unless they hold New Zealand citizenship. One party-list candidate in the 2002 election, Kelly Chal, could not assume her position as a member of parliament because she did not meet that criterion. Although the former MP Matt Robson, was an Australian citizen at the time of his election, he was able to stand for election, because he was registered as a voter before 1975.

=== Norway ===
Voting and eligibility rights were granted to Nordic Passport Union country citizens with a 3 years' residence condition for municipal and county elections in 1978. These rights were extended to all foreign residents in 1983. The voters enrollment is automatic. As a consequence of the 1983 extension, a 1990 bilateral treaty between Norway and Spain granted voting rights in Spain for Norwegian citizens. Currently, residing citizens of Nordic Passport Union countries may vote in local elections on the same basis as Norwegian citizens without any length of residence condition.

=== Philippines ===
Article V Section 1 of the Philippine constitution provides that suffrage may be exercised by all citizens of the Philippines not otherwise disqualified by law, who are at least eighteen years of age, and who shall have resided in the Philippines for at least one year, and in the place wherein they propose to vote, for at least six months immediately preceding the election.

=== Portugal ===
(EU member) In 1971, Brazilian residents were granted voting and eligibility rights in Portugal for municipal elections with a 2 years residency requirement and 4 years for eligibility. In 1982, this provision was extended to Cape Verde residents in the frame of reciprocity between Community of Portuguese Language Countries. It was again extended in 1997, under a general rule of reciprocity but with a 4 years residency requirement, to Peruvian and Uruguayan residents with eligibility (after 5 years of residency) and to residents from Argentina, Chile, Estonia, Israel, Norway and Venezuela without eligibility.

However, in 2005 this list of countries was reduced to

- voting rights in local elections: the EU countries (now including Estonia), Brazil, Cape Verde, Norway, Uruguay, Venezuela, Chile and Argentina, plus Iceland, thus minus Israel. A 2013 decree added Colombia, New Zealand and Peru
- eligibility to stand for election: the EU countries, Brazil and Cape Verde, thus minus Peru and Uruguay

Some Brazilian residents "with special status" (cidadãos brasileiros com estatuto especial de igualdade de direitos políticos) enjoy voting rights, but not eligibility rights, even for parliamentary and regional elections.

There is a political debate going on as to whether voting rights should be extended to all noncitizen residents, as the reciprocity clause excludes 50% of noncitizen residents. In May 2007, the High Commissioner of Migrations and Ethnic Minorities publicly advocated the abolition of the reciprocity clause and the extension of voting rights for foreign residents to all elections, including parliamentary and presidential elections.

=== Russia ===
Foreign citizens may vote and are eligible for local elections on the basis of international treaties. As of 2026, such treaties exist with Belarus, Turkmenistan, and Kyrgyzstan.

=== Saint Kitts and Nevis ===
Commonwealth citizens may vote, but are not eligible, for parliamentary elections, if born in the country before independence; "allegiance to a foreign State" is a criterion for voting rights disqualification.

=== Saint Lucia ===
Commonwealth citizens may vote, but are only those born in Saint Lucia are eligible, for parliamentary elections, if born in the country before independence; "allegiance to a foreign State" is a criterion for ineligibility.

=== Saint Vincent and the Grenadines ===
Commonwealth citizens aged 18 or over who have lived in St Vincent and the Grenadines for at least 12 months and in a constituency for at least 6 months are eligible to vote in that constituency.

=== Slovenia ===
(EU member) On May 29, 2002, the Slovenian Parliament passed amendments to the Law on Local Elections which gave voting rights in local elections to all foreigners with a permanent residence in Slovenia. In addition to electing local council representatives and mayors, foreigners with a permanent residence were also allowed to run for the position of local councillor. The voting rights of foreigners are based on Article 43 of the Constitution of Slovenia which states that a law may be used to determine the cases and conditions in which foreigners may vote.

The persons entitled to vote and to be elected as members of the National Council (upper house of the Slovenian Parliament) as a representative of employers, employees, farmers, small businesses and independent professionals, and non-profit making activities (functional interests) are those who perform a corresponding activity or who are employed. Under the 2002 law, National Council members belonging to these interest groups could be elected by foreigners under the same conditions as the citizens of Slovenia, i.e. that they are performing a corresponding activity or are employed in Slovenia. However, they could not be elected as National Council members. People with permanent residence in a constituency were entitled to vote and to be elected as members of the National Council, representing local interests.

On June 15, 2026, the Slovenian Parliament passed amendments removing the right to vote by third-country nationals (i.e., citizens of neither Slovenia nor another European Union country), affecting about 103,900 such persons. The proponents of the change indicated that it was based on parallels elsewhere (nationals of third countries do not have the right to vote in most EU countries) and reciprocity: most third-country nationals in Slovenia are from elsewhere in the former Yugoslavia, and Slovenian citizens in those countries that are outside the EU are not permitted to vote in local elections.

=== Slovakia ===
(EU member) In 2002, local voting rights were granted for 3-year residents.

=== South Africa ===
Only South African citizens may vote in elections, whether national or local. Article 19(3) of the 1996 South African Constitution states that "Every adult citizen has the right – a) to vote in elections for any legislative body established in terms of the Constitution...". No law provides voting rights for non-citizens.

Up to 1996, article 6 of the 1993 South African Constitution stated that "Every person who is- (a)(i) a South African citizen; or (ii) not such a citizen but who in terms of an Act of Parliament has been accorded the right to exercise the franchise; (b) of or over the age of 18 years; and (c) not subject to any disqualifications as may be prescribed by law, shall be entitled to vote in elections of the National Assembly, a provincial legislature or a local government and in referenda or plebiscites contemplated in this Constitution, in accordance with and subject to the laws regulating such elections, referenda and plebiscites".

=== South Korea ===
Revisions to voting laws in 2005 allow foreign nationals aged 19 years and older who have lived in South Korea for more than three years after obtaining permanent resident visas to vote in local elections. 106,068 foreign residents were eligible to vote in the June 13, 2018 local elections.

=== Spain ===
(EU member) Municipal voting rights are granted to citizens of countries which reciprocate by granting voting rights to Spanish citizens when reciprocity is enshrined in a bilateral treaty ratified by Spain, i.e. since 1997 the EU member states and Norway, but already since 1989-1990 Denmark, the Netherlands, Sweden and Norway. Bilateral treaties with Argentina (1988), Chile (1990) and Uruguay (1992) have never been enacted as voting rights are not enshrined in a specific law in Chile, and for the two other countries the instruments of ratification have never been exchanged, there are also similar "friendship treaties" with Colombia and Venezuela. There is an ongoing debate in Spain about either ratifying existing bilateral treaties or changing the constitution in order to grant all residents voting rights without reciprocity, but some Catalan parties are opposed to it. In 2019 the Spanish Government negotiated an agreement with the British Government to allow British Citizens to continue to enjoy voting rights in Spanish municipal elections after the United Kingdom withdrawal from the EU.

=== Sweden ===
(EU member) Voting and eligibility rights were granted to all foreign residents with a 3-year residence condition for municipal and county elections in 1975; the first elections with those rules were held in September 1976. The 3 year residence condition was suppressed in 1997 for residents from the EU (in conformity with the European legislation) and the Nordic Passport Union. Voter enrollment is automatic.

=== Switzerland ===
Some voting rights have been granted to non-citizens by subnational governments, the first being Neuchâtel in 1849, then Jura in 1978 and several others afterwards.

Because Switzerland is a federal state with three different levels – the Confederation, the 26 cantons and their local communes – non-citizen voting rights vary greatly depending on the individual entity. Foreigners may not cast ballots on the national level, but they may be entitled to vote and, in some cases, to run for office on the cantonal or communal level. Five cantons have already recognized the right of foreigners to vote (Neuchâtel, Jura, Vaud in 2003, Fribourg in 2004, Geneva in 2005), plus three, Appenzell Ausserrhoden (1995), Graubünden (2003) and Basel-Stadt (2005) which accord to each municipality the authority to decide on the subject. Some referendums unsuccessfully took place in other cantons.

=== Trinidad and Tobago ===
(CN members) A Commonwealth citizen who has resided legally in Trinidad and Tobago for a period of at least one year, and has resided in an electoral district/constituency for a least two months, prior to the qualifying date may vote at all levels in Trinidad and Tobago. Non-Commonwealth Citizen who has resided legally in Trinidad and Tobago for a period of at least five years, and has resided in an electoral district/constituency for a least two months, prior to the qualifying date may also vote, but are only eligible to vote in City or Borough elections within Trinidad. They cannot vote in Parliamentary or Tobago House of Assembly elections. For both Commonwealth and Non-Commonwealth citizens, who meet these requirements can vote if they are over the age of 18.

=== United Kingdom ===
In the United Kingdom, full voting rights and rights to stand as a candidate are given to citizens of Ireland and to "qualifying" citizens of Commonwealth countries; this is because they are not regarded in law as foreigners. This is a legacy of the situation that existed before 1983 where they had the status of British subjects.

Citizenship	Local elections		Devolved parliaments & assemblies			General (national) elections
Citizenship	ENG & NI	SCO & WLS	SCO	WLS	NI	General (national) elections
British	Yes		Yes			Yes
Irish	Yes		Yes			Yes
Commonwealth	Yes		Yes			Yes
Qualifying EU citizen: Denmark; Luxembourg; Poland; Portugal; Spain	Yes		Yes			No
EU citizens with retained rights: UK resident before 31 Dec. 2020; and a citizen of one of the following EU countries: Austria; Belgium; Bulgaria; Croatia; Czech Republic; Estonia; Finland; France; Germany; Greece; Hungary; Italy; Latvia; Lithuania; The Netherlands; Romania; Slovakia; Slovenia; Sweden	Yes		Yes			No
Non-EU & Non-Commonwealth	No	Yes	Yes	Yes	No	No

For local elections, supralocal elections (Greater London Authority, Police and Crime Commissioner) and elections to devolved Parliaments and Assemblies (Scottish Parliament, Senedd, Northern Ireland Assembly) elections, EU citizens enjoy the same rights as Commonwealth citizens.

Under Elected Authorities (Northern Ireland) Act 1989, local electors in Northern Ireland were either Commonwealth citizens or citizens of the Republic of Ireland, the Representation of the People Act 2000 replaced that section by "a Commonwealth citizen, a citizen of the Republic of Ireland or a relevant citizen of the Union".

The Representation of the People Act 2000 also introduced a new system of electoral registration, with 2 electoral registers, one for parliamentary elections, one for local elections:

- "A person is entitled to vote as an elector at a parliamentary election in any constituency if on the date of the poll he (...)(c) is either a Commonwealth citizen or a citizen of the Republic of Ireland"; "A person is entitled to be registered in the register of parliamentary electors for any constituency or part of a constituency if on the relevant date he (...) (c) is either a qualifying Commonwealth citizen or a citizen of the Republic of Ireland"
- "A person is entitled to vote as an elector at a local government election in any electoral area if on the date of the poll he (...)(c) is a Commonwealth citizen, a citizen of the Republic of Ireland or a relevant citizen of the Union"; "A person is entitled to be registered in the register of local government electors for any electoral area if on the relevant date he (...) (c) is a qualifying Commonwealth citizen, a citizen of the Republic of Ireland or a relevant citizen of the Union"
- "In this section “qualifying Commonwealth citizen” means a Commonwealth citizen who either"
  - (a) is not a person who requires leave under the [1971 c. 77.] Immigration Act 1971 to enter or remain in the United Kingdom, or
  - (b) is such a person but for the time being has (or is, by virtue of any enactment, to be treated as having) any description of such leave"

After Brexit, the British Government announced changes to the rights of EU citizens arriving after January 1, 2021. They would only be granted the right to vote in local elections if there was a reciprocal agreement in place. Current local voting rules place EU citizens into two categories: Qualifying EU citizen and EU citizen with retained rights. A qualifying EU citizen has permission to remain in the UK and is from one of the countries that has a bilateral Voting and Candidacy Rights (VCR) treaty with the UK. Currently only Denmark, Luxembourg, Poland, Portugal, and Spain have an active VCR treaty with the UK. Those from other EU countries can only vote in local elections if they are a EU citizens with retained rights, meaning they were a resident prior to Brexit occurring.

==== Wales ====
The National Assembly for Wales (now Senedd Cymru or the Welsh Parliament, simply Senedd) passed the Senedd and Elections (Wales) Act 2020 in November 2019. The Act extended the franchise for local and Senedd elections to 16 and 17 year olds and all other resident foreign nationals holding leave under the Immigration Act 1971. This made Wales the first jurisdiction in the UK that allows non-EU and non-Commonwealth citizens to join the electoral register.

==== Scotland ====
In February 2020, the Scottish Parliament voted to extend the voting franchise for local and Scottish Parliament elections to include any other foreign nationals holding leave under the Immigration Act 1971. Thus, Scotland immediately followed Wales in allowing non-EU and non-Commonwealth citizens to join the electoral register.

=== United States ===
Municipalities in Maryland that allow non-citizen suffrage.

Municipalities with non-citizen suffrage in Vermont (Burlington not highlighted)

As of 2018, nearly 10% of people living in the U.S. weren't citizens. As of 2024, no non-citizen was allowed vote in the United States for federal or statewide elections, though some local governments allowed non-citizens limited suffrage. Before 1926, 40 states had at one point encouraged voting regardless of citizenship status. Voting rights at the local level have also more recently been granted to non-citizens by some town governments, either for school boards or for municipal councils. Examples include: Barnesville (already since 1918), Martin's Additions and Somerset (since 1976), Takoma Park (since 1991) and Garrett Park (since 1999), Chevy Chase Section 3, Hyattsville, Mount Rainier, Riverdale Park, Glen Echo, Montpelier and Winooski (2021). Turnout by non-citizens has been very low (sometimes less than 0.5% of voters) in cities where non-citizen voting is legal, with some non-citizens expressing fear that about the spotlight and backlash and fear around how voting might hurt their application to become citizens.

=== Uruguay ===
Since 1952, 15-year residents have had national voting rights.

=== Venezuela ===
In Venezuela, the right to vote in municipal, parish (county), and state elections extends to foreigners over the age of eighteen who have ten years’ residency or more in the country. The provision for non-citizen voting appears in Article 64 of the Venezuelan Constitution of 1999, and has its constitutional roots in a 1983 Amendment to the previous Constitution of 1961.

== See also ==
- Statelessness
- Taxation without representation
- Voting age
- Women's suffrage
- Youth suffrage
