= Jane Markey =

American judge

Jane E. Markey is a judge of the Michigan Court of Appeals Third District.

Markey has a bachelor's degree from Michigan State University. She has a Juris Doctor degree from Thomas M. Cooley Law School. She was first elected a judge in 1990 and has been on the court of appeals since 1994.

She has sought the GOP nomination for the state Supreme Court.

== Court decisions ==
Markey, along with judges Mark Boonstra, and Stephen Borrello overturned a lower court verdict, that involved a tire coming off a vehicle, shortly after a tire rotation was performed at a dealer in Grand Rapids, Michigan, in October 2013. Lug nuts apparently had failed to be tightened or torqued resulting in an accident and injuries. The plaintiffs, Samuel Anaya and Doris Myricks, through their attorney, sued for injuries, negligence, and a violation of the Motor Vehicle Service and Repair Act (Act 300 of 1974) The three judge panel reached a unanimous conclusion:

We conclude, under the plain language of MCL257.1307a, that defendants “performed” a tire rotation, albeit negligently...There is no support for the trial court’s determination that a tire rotation is not “performed” if a service person fails to sufficiently tighten the lug nuts on one tire.

The 3-0 decision revolved around the word "performed" and it was decided that the work of revolving the tires had been performed even if the lug nuts failed to be tightened. The court consulted the 11th edition of Merriam-Webster's Collegiate Dictionary to determine that a job could be considered "performed" even if incorrectly. Judge Boonstra authored the decision.

== Sources ==
- Appeals Court bio of Markey
- Campaign bio of Markey
