= Charles Macheers =

American politician

Member of the Kansas House of Representatives from the 39th district
- In office January 14, 2013 – January 8, 2017
- Preceded by: Owen Donohoe
- Succeeded by: Shelee Brim

Personal details
- Born: July 4, 1967 (age 59) Wichita, Kansas, U.S.
- Party: Republican
- Spouse: Diane Macheers
- Children: 1 son
- Education: University of Kansas; Thomas M. Cooley Law School
- Occupation: Attorney, Politician
- Profession: Law

Charles Macheers (July 4, 1967) is a former Republican member of the Kansas House of Representatives; he represented the 39th district from 2013 to 2017
