= Shelee Brim =

American politician from Kansas

Member of the Kansas House of Representatives from the 39th district
- In office January 9, 2017 – January 14, 2019
- Preceded by: Charles Macheers
- Succeeded by: Owen Donohoe

Personal details
- Born: September 10, 1962 (age 63)
- Party: Republican

Shelee Brim (born September 10, 1962) is an American politician who served in the Kansas House of Representatives from the 39th district in Johnson County, Kansas from 2017 to 2019. She is a retired teacher.

2017-2018 Kansas House of Representatives Committee Assignments

- Veterans and Military
- Transportation
- Higher Education Budget
