= Convention on the Participation of Foreigners in Public Life at Local Level =

1992 Council of Europe treaty

The Convention on the Participation of Foreigners in Public Life at Local Level is a treaty of the Council of Europe, adopted in 1992. Chapter C grants to non-citizens the right to vote and the right to stand for elections in case of local elections, provided that they fulfill the same legal requirements as apply to citizens and have been lawful and habitual residents in the State concerned for the five years preceding the elections.

The convention came into force in 1997, after the fourth ratification. As of 2018, the convention has been ratified by nine member states (Albania, Denmark, Finland, Iceland, Italy, Norway, the Netherlands, Sweden, Czechia). Lithuania and Slovenia have signed the convention, but not ratified it. Some of these countries have reserved the right not to apply Chapters B or C of the treaty.
