= Wafaa (party) =

Political party in Algeria

The Wafaa is an illegal political party in Algeria. The party was founded by Ahmed Taleb Ibrahimi, son of Bashir al-Ibrahimi and several times a minister in the Boumédiène and Bendjedid eras. It was banned in 2000 for alleged links to the outlawed Islamic Salvation Front (FIS).
