= Workers Party of Ukraine (Marxist–Leninist) =

The Workers Party of Ukraine (Marxist–Leninist) was established in Ukraine in March 2012. Its chairman is Oleksandr Bondarchuk, who was formerly a member of parliament from the Communist Party of Ukraine for two sessions. In July 2022, the party was banned.
