= Anthony H. Gair =

American lawyer (1948–2023)

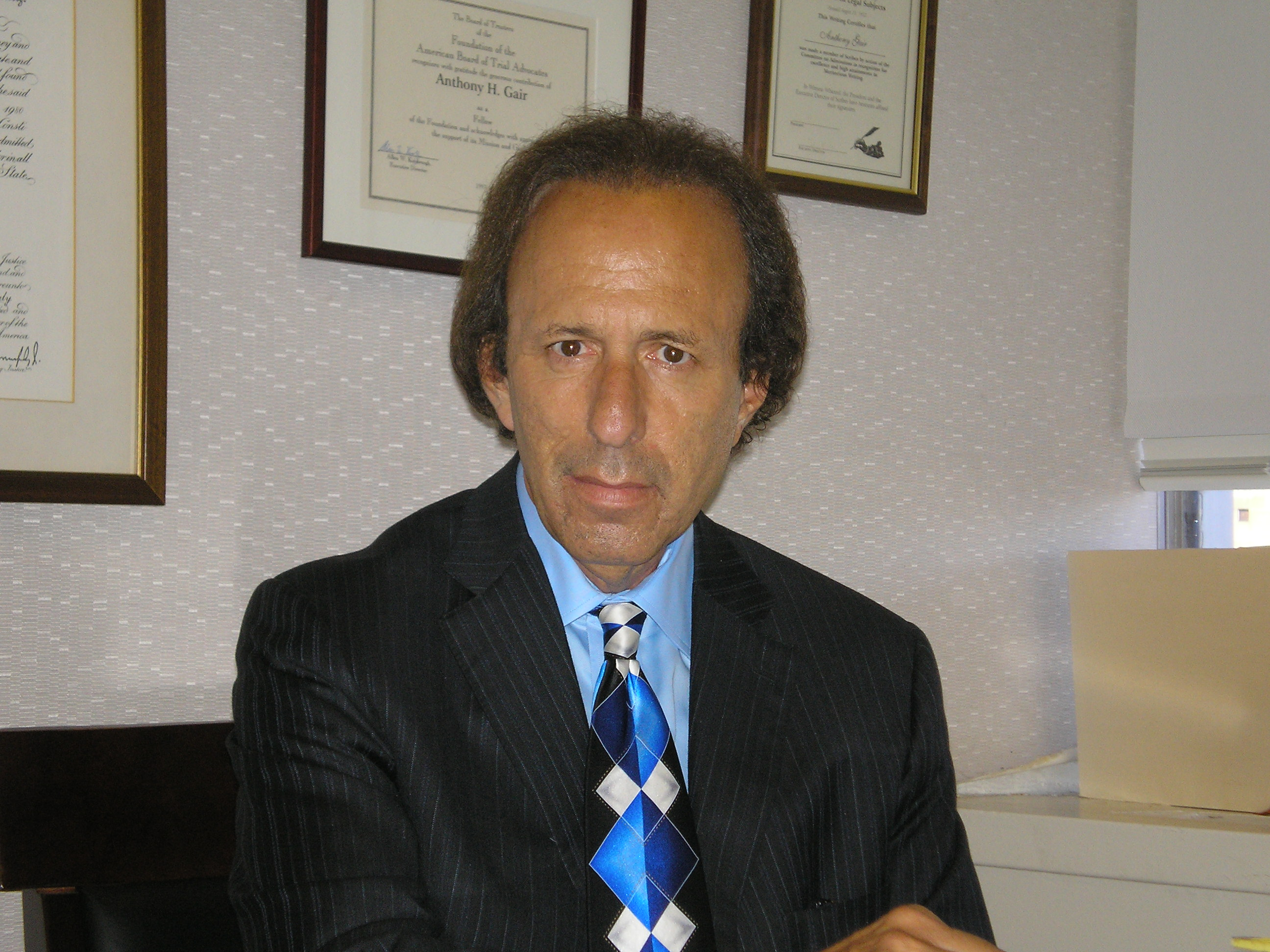
- Born: December 24, 1948
- Died: March 29, 2023 (aged 74)
- Education: Long Island University (B.A.); Thomas M. Cooley Law School (J.D.); New York University School of Law (LL.M)

Anthony H. Gair (December 24, 1948 – March 29, 2023) was an American attorney and advocate. He was a partner of the law firm Gair, Gair, Conason, Rubinowitz, Bloom, Hershenhorn, Steigman & Mackauf, which was founded by his parents in 1945. He looks for cases that are in the public interest. Notably, he represented the family of Amadou Diallo in a case that spurred reform of the New York City Police Department.

== Background ==
In 1971 Gair received his Bachelor of Arts from Long Island University. In 1980 he graduated cum laude with a J.D. from Thomas M. Cooley Law School, and received his Master of Laws from New York University School of Law in 1985. He was admitted in 1980 to practice in New York, U.S. District Court, and the Southern and Eastern Districts of New York.

== Amadou Diallo case ==
Anthony Gair represented the mother of Amadou Diallo, who was shot 41 times by officers of the New York Police Department's Street Crimes Unit. The city of New York agreed to pay $3 million to the family of Amadou Diallo. This amount is the largest amount that has ever been paid by the city of New York in a wrongful-death action for the death of a single individual with no dependents.

=== Early problems with calculating a remuneration ===
The financial calculation for remuneration of Diallo's death would be complicated: He had no wife nor any children; he was killed instantly (and thus ineligible for pain and suffering compensation); lastly, he was a street vendor earning $10,000 a year. But the city was eager to dispense with the high-profile case, which had inspired protests led by Al Sharpton. The NYPD and the city had come under heavy criticism for their handling of the investigation and their perceived insensitivity. Along with the rape of Abner Louima, the Amadou Diallo case came to symbolize a police department in need of reform.

=== First legal team led by Barry Scheck ===
Diallo's estate first hired Barry Scheck, Johnnie Cochran and Peter Neufeld to represent their interests; however, in 1999 both of Mr. Diallo's parents ordered them replaced. In their stead Kadiadou Diallo hired Gair.

An issue arose between the new legal team, headed by Gair, and the Scheck team, which asserted $40,000 of legal fees. Gair agreed to reimburse those fees; however, in order to move forward with suit the Sheck's files needed to be transferred to Gair. The Gair team turned asked the court to order them moved, which the Scheck team felt a heavy-handed tactic. The real battle revolved around not the amount of the Scheck team's fees, but how they would be compensated. The manner of calculation would be the ultimate determiner of the amount. $40,000 was only a starting point upon which both parties agreed. A Scheck spokesperson felt, however, that they should be paid by a percentage of the judgment or settlement. But the Gair team felt the compensation should be paid on quantum meruit, meaning a percentage calculated by determining the percentage of work each firm put into winning the final sum.

=== Gair firm takes lead of the case ===
Judge Lee Holzman held that Gair's counsel would be lead, which would put him in a more lucrative position relative to the other firms. His firm received 62.5 percent of the lawyers' fees (typically equal to a third of the settlement, which remained uncertain).

=== Resolution for all parties ===
The case eventually led to a federal investigation and the disbandment of the NYPD's Street Crimes Unit. On January 6, 2004, Diallo's family agreed to a $3 million settlement. Neither the NYPD nor the city admitted any wrongdoing, but they expressed with deep "regret what occurred and extend [our] sympathies to the Diallo family." Mrs. Diallo originally sought $20 million in compensatory damages and $41 million in punitive damages. All parties reportedly agreed the settlement was just, including the officers, the city, the NYPD, and Diallo's estate. "What we lost cannot be replaced, but we agreed to join hands with the city and accept this closure," said Kadiadou Diallo. Mayor Michael Bloomberg said: "It's just not a substitute for a human life. But it was a chapter out of our history and I'm just glad that we were able to come to a financial settlement with the family and let's get on with it."

== Legal scion ==
Gair comes from a distinguished legal tradition. His father Harry A. Gair founded Gair & Gair in 1945 when Harriet Gair (d. 2006) became partner in the firm. She had worked for Harry since she was fifteen. Harriet attended New York University School of Law and received her LL.B. in 1940. She became managing partner in 1945. She was President of the New York Women's Bar Association, and remained counsel to the firm past 90 years of age.

== Recognition ==
- Order of the Barristers
- American Jurisprudence Award in Criminal Procedure and Constitutional Law

== Quotes ==
- "I don't think there's any question that should we bring it in the Bronx it will remain in the Bronx," in reference to the jurisdictional wrangling for Amadou Diallo's civil trial against the NYPD for wrongful death.

== Selected writings ==
- Proving Medical Malpractice by a Physician Who Performs Elective Plastic Surgery, Medical Malpractice Law and Strategy, Vol. XX, No. 2, December 2002.
- Presentation of Damages in a Personal Injury Case - The Plaintiff's Perspective, New York State Bar Association, Trial Lawyers Section Digest, 2002.
- Proving Dental Malpractice in a Case of Osteoradionecrosis Following Tooth Extraction, Medical Malpractice Law & Strategy Vol. XIX, No.8, June 2002.
- Orthopedic Malpractice: Failure to Diagnose Injury to Popliteal Artery, Medical Malpractice Law & Strategy, Vol. XVIII, No. 9, 2001.
- Is It Necessarily Malpractice: Failure to Revise Shunt in Hydrocephalus Patient, Medical Malpractice Law and Strategy, Vol. XVI, No. 5, March 1999.
- New Frontier in Products Liability, New York Law Journal, September 16, 1996.
- Personal Injury Litigation-Workplace Related Injuries, New York State Bar Association,
- Culpable Conduct/Comparative Fault Issues as Applicable to a Products Liability Case, Products Liability in New York, Strategy and Practice, New York State Bar Association, 1997
- Prosecuting a Case of Failure to Diagnose Compartment Syndrome, Medical Malpractice Law and Strategy, Vol. XV, No. 12, October 1998
- Cosmetic Surgical Malpractice: Loss of Vision following Blepharoplasty, Medical Malpractice Law and Strategy, 2000
- Chemotherapy: Failure to Properly Treat Extravasation of Doxorubicin, Medical Malpractice Law and Strategy, Vol. XVIII, No.10 August 2000
