= Local election =

Election for local government

In many parts of the world, local elections take place to select office-holders in local government, such as mayors and councillors. Elections to positions within a city or town are often known as municipal elections. Their form and conduct vary widely across jurisdictions.

== By area ==
=== Europe ===
Adopted by the Congress of the Council of Europe, The European Charter of Local Self-Government aims to establish basic European rules in order to measure and safeguard the rights of local authorities. The Charter commits the parties to applying basic rules guaranteeing the political, administrative and financial independence of local authorities. The Congress conducts two main activities so as to evaluate the Charter's implementation: local and regional election monitoring and observation. The Congress regularly observes local and/or regional elections in member and applicant countries, which allows the Council to monitor the state of local and regional democracy in the countries concerned. With regard to its monitoring mission, the Congress prepares monitoring reports.

=== Middle East ===
In Saudi Arabia and Kuwait, local elections have proven to be easier to achieve than larger scale ones that affect the national or federal government. By giving voice to people on the smaller scales of government, over such issues as water supply, power, and sewer systems, confidence is thought to be built to eventually reform higher levels of government.

=== New Zealand ===
Local elections are held every three years to elect local government politicians for the two tiers of local government in New Zealand.

=== United Kingdom ===
In the United Kingdom the term local elections refers to county, unitary authority, borough, district, city, town and parish elections. These take place on the first Thursday of May every year. Councillors generally sit for four years. The number of independent (non-party) Councillors has declined over the past forty years - nowadays the overwhelming majority of local Councillors belong to one of the major parties.

=== United States ===
In the United States there is an increasing demand for electoral reform, including a call for instant-runoff voting to be used to select all major executives. This is thought to make it possible for small parties to compete, as in the case of Matt Gonzalez in San Francisco, California. Such a ballot reform is often a complement to moving towards a "strong mayor" system, such as in Baltimore, Maryland, or as recently advocated in Oakland, California.

Residents of Takoma Park, Maryland can vote in municipal elections when they turn sixteen - the first in the United States.

== See also ==
- By-election
- General election
- Gubernatorial election
- Non-citizen suffrage
  - Convention on the Participation of Foreigners in Public Life at Local Level
