= David Fleischer (judge) =

American judge (born 1974)

Judge of the Harris County Criminal Court at Law No. 5
- Incumbent
- Assumed office January 2019
- Preceded by: Margaret Harris

Personal details
- Born: December 6, 1974 (age 51) Houston, Texas, U.S.
- Party: Democratic
- Education: University of Houston (BA); Cooley Law School (JD)

David Marcel Fleischer (born December 6, 1974) is an American judge of the Harris County Criminal Court in Texas. He was first elected to the position in 2018, running as a Democrat, and won reelection in 2022. Fleischer has gained a following online for holding defendants accountable while offering them guidance. His livestreamed courtroom proceedings have also drawn criticism, including from at least one attorney who appears in his court, and in 2024 the Harris County Criminal Lawyers Association approved printing cards warning defendants about the livestream and the possibility of going viral online.

== Biography ==
Fleischer was born on December 6, 1974, in Houston, Texas to a Jewish family. He is a first-generation American whose parents immigrated from Santiago, Chile, to Houston in 1973. He graduated from the University of Houston and Cooley Law School. Fleischer has been a lawyer in Texas since 2004 and was a criminal defense attorney before running for public office.

In 2018, Fleischer ran for Harris County Criminal Court at Law No. 5 after incumbent Margaret Harris declined to run for reelection. He focused his campaign on reforming the court and ensuring that all defendants are treated fairly and equally. In the Democratic primary, he faced two challengers and received 50% of the vote, moving on to the general election. In the general election, Fleischer defeated Republican Xavier Alfaro 55.13% to 44.87%.

Once in office, Fleischer worked with other newly elected reform judges to settle lawsuits that ruled the bail practices in Harris County were unconstitutional. Under the enacted bail reform, there was a significant reduction of people denied a bond for misdemeanor offenses. Policies were adopted not to jail defendants for being late to court or testing positive for marijuana, and to provide lawyers for misdemeanor defendants at bail hearings. The rate of repeat offending stayed stable through the transition.

Fleischer ran for re-election in 2022 and, like other reform judges, faced two District Attorney challengers, a Democrat and a Republican. In the March primary election, Fleischer defeated challenger Carlos Aguayo 53.48% to 46.52%. In the general election, he faced Elizabeth Buss who had criticized the county's progressive judges for the increase in violence. Fleischer defended the county's bail reform, saying, "We put in a lot of work [to show] that any fear that someone might have had about bail reform is just nonsensical in the misdemeanor arena." In the November election, Fleischer narrowly defeated Buss, 50.15% to 49.85%.

In 2024, Fleischer received national attention for his viral videos for his blunt commentary while ruling on cases, while also providing guidance and compassion for defendants. He has also received praise for his stance on racial justice and for dismissing cases involving potential racial profiling by law enforcement. Some defense attorneys have criticized Fleischer for "playing to the camera" when live streaming his cases.

In 2026, Fleischer was unopposed in the Democratic primary, and faced Republican Stella Stevens in the November election. On November 3rd, 2026, Fleischer defeated Stevens 60.3% to 39.7%.

== Personal life ==
Fleischer is married and has four children with his wife.
