= Donbas separatism =

Separatist movement in the Donbas region of Ukraine

Donbas separatism is separatist sentiment in the southeast of Ukraine. According to proponents, there is a "common historical, cultural and economic region of Donbas". According to the authors of the concept of the region "is committed to the formation of autonomous and independent states on the territory of Donbas".

== History ==
=== Pre-revolutionary period ===
Before the 1917 revolution, the idea of administrative allocation of industrial Donbas region, combining these areas of administrative division in the Russian Empire, the boundaries of two provinces and regions of the Don Cossacks during several decades expressed by representatives of the big bourgeoisie. First of all, it is on the Board of the South of Russia Congress of Miners (SSGYUR). Positioning itself as a structure that unites leaders of Donbas, the Union has created a regional economic structure of the region do not recognize administrative boundaries of the empire, which were formed long before the territory of Donbas industrial mines and large enterprises. Avdakov represented Kharkiv, the rest were from Rostov, Mariupol, and even Yuzovka Voronezh.

Almost from its inception, the Congress of Miners actively sought administrative reforms of the Russian Empire, or at least those regions, which focused business entrepreneurs Donbas.

=== Revolution of 1917 ===
The idea of separation of Donbas in the special administrative unit belonged to the Bolsheviks did not, what actually writes directly and Vynnychenko, who said that "Donetsk Federative Soviet Republic" creates "quite that same list as in the Cadet Commission of the Provisional Government, both instructions General Secretariat, the province of Kharkiv, Ekaterinoslav, Kherson (coal, iron, bread) created a republic "

In 1917, von Ditmar made great efforts to implement the idea of the administrative unification of the Donets Basin. Back in March, immediately after the February Revolution, the Council called for the formation of miners in Kharkov special committee to manage the industry margin. In July, with the participation of Dietmar was convened Constituent Congress of the regional supply of Donbas, the main purpose of which was to create a single coordinating body managing the economy of Donbas.

Ditmar, expressing the view of business circles of Donbas, saw nothing in common with industrial regions Donkrivbassa Central Ukraine: "The whole area as industrialized as well as the geographical and household appears to be completely different from Kyiv. This whole area has its own completely independent of paramount importance for Russia, lives an independent life, and administrative subordination of the Kharkov region Kyiv region decisively no call, but rather as totally responsible life is artificial subjugation only complicate and hamper the entire life of the district, the more that this submission is not dictated by questions of expediency and state requirements, but only the national aspirations leaders of the Ukrainian movement."

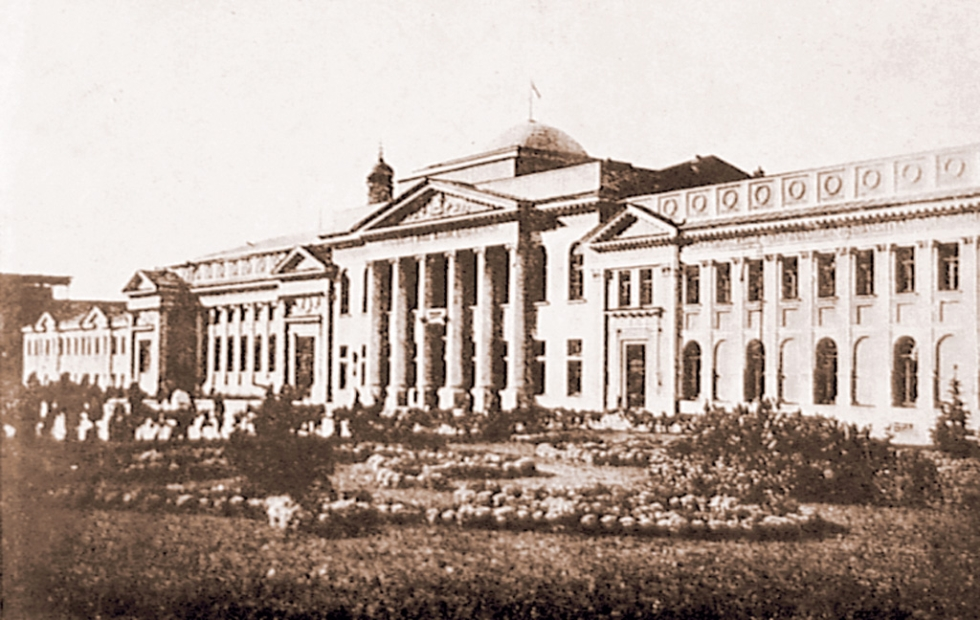
House of Nobility Assembly in Kharkov

=== Ukrainian People's Republic ===
For the first time the establishment of the state of education in the Donbas at the official level was set November 17, 1917 at the plenary session of the Regional Committee of the Soviet of Workers 'and Soldiers' Deputies Donkrivbassa in Kharkov. The main report "On the Ukrainian question" did the Menshevik Rubinstein, who put forward the idea popular in the province, "the indivisibility of the Donets Basin and the insubordination of regional management of other territorial regional government." Judging by the title of the report, it is clear that such "regional government" considered harkovtsy Central Rada, putting the Donetsk-Krivoy Rog region and Ukraine by one notch administrative - territorial hierarchy. The resolution called for a referendum on the territory of Donbas on the matter

Mykola Skrypnyk states that the idea of "separating the Donets Basin of Ukraine" have arisen in the minds of some of our comrades back in August - October 1917.

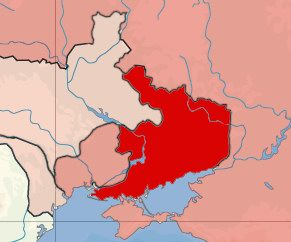
Donetsk–Krivoy Rog Soviet Republic

On Saturday, December 9, in the room of the Noble Assembly in Kharkov III opened an extraordinary congress of Soviets Donetsk-Krivoy Rog area, which was hastily assembled in order to discuss the relation to the Central Rada and the "Ukrainian question." According to the author of the foreword to the materials on the trees and shrubs in the "Annals of the Revolution» X. Myshkis, among other things, the congress "had to decide on the organization of the republic" - the Donetsk-Krivoy Rog republic.

According to Bosch, the Menshevik faction at the Congress proposes to limit the adoption of "regulations, which the Donetsk-Krivoy Rog region declares himself autonomous region, independently from the central Ukrainian authorities nor from the Russian," and the Kharkov Council considered "the highest authority in the field."

After the declaration of the Fourth wagon of the Central Council, announces the creation of an independent Ukraine spread its borders in the Donetsk-Krivoy Rog area .In among local political circles there was an idea of the survey population, and which was supported by the executive committee of Donetsk-Krivoy Rog area (at the time there were 7 Bolsheviks 13 Mensheviks and SRs). The resolution called for a referendum on the political future of the region.

Flag of the International Movement of Donbass

In a referendum on the ownership of Donbas and certain regions in Ukraine insisted then Soviet leadership of Russia. This was clearly stated a representative of the CPC Lenin, Joseph Stalin in the negotiations on a direct line with one of the leaders of the Central Rada Mykola Porsche 17 November 1917. Separation or autonomization of Donbas rejected.

=== Ukraine ===
- 1994: referendum in the Donetsk and Lugansk regions
- 2004: South-East Ukrainian Autonomous Republic
- 2014: Donetsk People's Republic
- 2014: Luhansk People's Republic
- 2014: Donbas status referendums, 2014

In a February 2014 poll by the Kyiv International Institute of Sociology, 33% of residents in Donetsk oblast and 24% in Luhansk oblast wanted to form a single country with Russia. A survey conducted in early March 2014 found 59% of Donbas residents favoured a federal system of national government over Ukraine's unitary one. A late March 2014 survey showed that in the Donbas 18% of residents supported separatist sentiments, 17% wanted their oblast to form an independent state, and 24% would like it to join a foreign country.

As of 23 June 2022, Russian officials claimed to control 55% of the Donetsk region.

== See also ==
- Catalan independence
- Scottish independence
- Basque nationalism
- United Ireland
- Russian irredentism
- Irredentism
- Corsican nationalism

== Literature ==
- Белаш Виктор — Дороги Нестора Махно
- Поплавсъкий О. О. Донецько — Криворізька Радянська республіка: історико — політичний аспект. Дисертація на здобуття вченого ступеня кандидата історичних наук. Днепропетровск: ДНУ, 2010.
- Донбасский сепаратизм. Восхождени
- Теодор Фридгут — «Юзовка и революция. Жизнь и труд в российском Донбассе, 1869—1924»
- Матеріали та документи про Донецько — Криворізьку республіку//Літопис революції, 1928, № 3, стр. 246—283.
- Бош, Евгения: Год борьбы. Борьба за власть на Украине с апреля 1917 г. до немецкой оккупации, Москва: 1925
- Винниченко В. Щоденник т. 2 : 1921—1925 рр.
- Корнилов Владимир Владимирович Донецко-Криворожская республика. Расстрелянная мечта
