= Cooley Law School =

Private law school in Lansing, Michigan, US

Coordinates: 42.7310°N 84.5544°W

Thomas M. Cooley Law School
- Motto: In corde hominum est anima legis In the heart of men is the soul of the law
- Established: 1972; 54 years ago
- School type: Private law school
- Endowment: $37.8 million (2020)
- Dean: James McGrath
- Location: Lansing, Michigan (flagship); Temple Terrace, Florida
- Enrollment: 420
- USNWR ranking: 178-195 (2025) (at most, bottom 8.16%)
- Bar pass rate: 40% (July 2025 Michigan bar exam first-time takers)
- Website: cooley.edu

Thomas M. Cooley Law School (commonly referred to as Cooley Law School) is a private law school in Lansing, Michigan, and Temple Terrace, Florida. It was established in 1972. At its peak in 2010, Cooley had over 3,900 students and was the largest U.S. law school by enrollment; as of October 2024, Cooley had 420 students between its two campuses. In November 2025, Cooley failed to reach the 75% two-year bar passage required of ABA Standard 316 for continued accreditation and, effective 2025, was placed on probation. Cooley was removed from its probationary status and was found in full compliance two months later in November 2025.

== History ==
=== Founding ===
The Thomas M. Cooley Law School was established by a group of lawyers and judges led by Thomas E. Brennan, a former Chief Justice of the Michigan Supreme Court (from 1969–1970). The school was named in honor of Thomas McIntyre Cooley (1824–1898), a prominent 19th-century jurist, who was also a former Michigan Supreme Court Chief Justice, and former dean of the University of Michigan Law School.

Cooley was incorporated in October 1971, with operation dependent on approval of the State Board of Education. Despite opposition from a committee of lawyers and law professors, the Board of Education approved establishment of the school in summer 1972 and the school began operations on January 10, 1973. The problems of funding and facilities raised at the Board of Education were not yet resolved but Brennan expressed confidence these issues would be worked out.

=== Expansion and contraction ===
==== Lansing campus ====
Cooley opened in 1973 in a small building on Grand Avenue near downtown Lansing. Cooley opened as night school for the first six months with 76 students and had 221 students by the end of 1973. The faculty included active judges and part-time professors.

In 1974, Cooley purchased and then extensively renovated the former Lansing Masonic Temple Building to house the school. The purchase price was $400,000 (about $2.03 million in 2025), and renovation costs were over $10 million (over $50.7 million in 2025). The Temple building housed most of the operations of the law school until the Cooley Center Building was completed, and continued to be used by the school for instruction until 2008, and for operations until 2014.

Cooley renovated the former JCPenney building in downtown Lansing as the Thomas E. Brennan Law Library, opening in 1993. The purchase price was $700,000 and the cost of renovation was $11 million (respectively about $1.41 million and $22.1 million in 2025).

Cooley purchased and then extensively renovated the former Lansing Commerce Center Building over the period from 2004 to 2007, with a later buildout in 2013 to become the principal teaching and administrative center of the law school, the Cooley Center. The original 14-story office building was redesigned as a 10-story building with higher ceilings to accommodate classrooms. The purchase price was $1.5 million, and renovations cost $35 million (about $2.51 million and $52.3 million, respectively, in 2025).

In 2010, Cooley expanded the Brennan Library, opening the first phase of a $6 million ($8.6 million in 2025) expansion, adding The Center for Research and Study in the former Town Center Building, eventually doubling the size of the library to 138,927 square feet, to become second largest American law-school library by size.

Though not a part of the law school campus, Cooley was also the name sponsor of "Cooley Law School Stadium", currently Jackson Field, the home stadium of the baseball minor league Lansing Lugnuts in downtown Lansing from 2010 to 2020.

Over the 2021-2022 timeframe, Cooley moved the Brennan Library to the Cooley Center, and closed the Center for Research and Study, consolidating all of its Lansing campus operations to the Cooley Center building.

==== Tampa campus ====
In May 2012, Cooley opened a new branch campus in Riverview, Florida, an inner-ring Tampa suburb. The initial enrollment was 104, with facilities designed to accommodate 700 students. The initial campus 132,000-square-foot building included a 25,000-square-foot law library, 336-seat auditorium and 24 classrooms. Full curriculum was planned to be rolled out over a 3-year period, with 65 full time faculty and staff and 35 part-time faculty. In 2025, Cooley Law School officially moved their Tampa campus from Riverview, Florida to nearby Temple Terrace, Florida, which is also in Hillsborough County.

==== Former campuses ====
- Auburn Hills: In 2002, Cooley began offering first-year classes at facilities on the campus of Oakland University in Auburn Hills with 28 students. By 2009 enrollment at the Auburn Hills campus had increased to 670 students, and Cooley built a 65,000 ft2 addition to accommodate up to 1,200 students. In 2019, Cooley closed its Auburn Hills campus.
- Grand Rapids: In 2003, Cooley also commenced offering classes in Grand Rapids, Michigan and opened a campus in 2006. At its peak, the Grand Rapids campus had approximately 700 students. In 2020, Cooley announced it would close its Grand Rapids campus by August 31, 2021, pending approval by accrediting agencies, and that it had ceased providing classes at WMU's Kalamazoo campus.
- Ann Arbor: In 2009, Cooley opened a branch campus in Ann Arbor, Michigan with an initial enrollment of 84 students. After suffering a 35% decline in enrollment across its five campuses between 2012 and 2013, Cooley announced in July 2014, that it would not be enrolling first year students on its Ann Arbor campus for the following term. The announcement also called for cuts in faculty and staff. In August 2014, Cooley had begun laying off faculty and staff at all its campuses. A JD Journal article claimed that the layoffs would exceed 50%, but James Robb denied this claim. In October 2014 Cooley announced the Ann Arbor campus would close at year-end.
- Kalamazoo: At the same time as it announced the closing of the Ann Arbor campus, Cooley restated its intent to offer classes in Kalamazoo, Michigan in connection with its affiliation with Western Michigan University ("WMU"). Cooley closed its campus in Kalamazoo in 2020.

==== Six-year affiliation with Western Michigan University ====
On July 28, 2014, the ABA and the Higher Learning Commission gave their approval to an affiliation between Cooley and Western Michigan University. On August 13, 2014, the affiliation became official and included Cooley changing its name from "Thomas M. Cooley Law School" to "Western Michigan University Cooley Law School". Cooley then offered classes on each of Western Michigan's four campuses.

On November 5, 2020, WMU's board of trustees voted to end its affiliation with Cooley, indicating the board believed that affiliation with Cooley had become a distraction from the university's core mission. The disassociation took effect November 5, 2023, and "Western Michigan University" was dropped from the school's name.

== Accreditation ==
Cooley has been accredited by the Higher Learning Commission since 2001, and by the American Bar Association (ABA) since 1975, although in August 2025 it was placed on probation, Cooley was removed from probation in November 2025. Beginning in 2020, Cooley has failed to reach the 75% two–year bar passage required of ABA Standard 316 for continued accreditation and, effective 2025, was placed on probation by the ABA due to noncompliance with the required minimum two-year bar passage rate, but was found in compliance and off probation in November 2025. In 2020, the ABA's Section of Legal Education and Admissions to the Bar determined Cooley had failed to significantly comply with Standard 316, which was revised in 2019 to provide that at least 75% of an accredited law school's graduates who took a bar exam must pass one within two years of graduation. Cooley failed to reach the 75% standard as demonstrated by statistics released by the ABA at the end of April, 2021. Those statistics showed Cooley with a 62.31% pass rate for Class of 2018 graduates, compared with 66.01% for Class of 2017 graduates. Cooley was found in 2022 to have a 59.51% ultimate bar passage rate for the Class of 2019, but was granted a two-year extension to meet the 316 standard subject to various conditions including working with faculty to improve teaching and learning, reviewing the effects of more rigorous grading policies, and making a “significant financial investment” in a “reliable plan” to ensure that the law school has resources to operate in compliance with the standard. As of 2020, Cooley had failed to reach the 75% two year bar passage required of ABA Standard 316 for continued accreditation, and as of early 2024, based on statistics for 2021 graduates, the school had the lowest two-year bar passage rate among ABA-accredited law schools, at 55.87%. As such, effective 2025, Cooley was placed on probation by the ABA due to noncompliance with the required minimum two-year bar passage rate. Cooley was found to be fully compliant in November 2025 and taken off probation.

== Admissions ==
For the class entering in 2024, Cooley accepted 47.59% of applicants, with 25.14% of those accepted enrolling. The average enrollee had a 147 LSAT score (the bottom 28.79% of test takers) and 3.15 undergraduate GPA (one enrollee was not included in the GPA calculation).

== Ranking and reputation ==
For 2024, U.S. News & World Report ranked Cooley in its lowest brackets: #180-196 overall of 196 ABA law schools, and #65-70 of 70 part-time ABA schools (which are, at most, in the bottom 8.16% and 7.14% of ABA schools, respectively).

It attracted national attention following the indictment and disbarment of Donald Trump’s attorney, Michael Cohen, a Cooley alumnus. The criticisms are based on Cooley's admission standards (among the ten lowest in the country, accepting at some points over 85% of applicants), its low graduation rates, its low bar passage rates (which led to litigation between Cooley and the ABA over Cooley's accreditation), and its low job placement figures. Cooley counters that its admission policies are intended to provide access to a legal education to those traditionally denied such access (those with low LSAT scores and GPAs).

Multiple media outlets have labeled Cooley the "worst law school in America".

According to the research conducted by Law School Transparency in 2017, Cooley was one of the most at-risk law schools for exploiting students for tuition.

== Curriculum ==
Cooley awards the J.D. degree.

Cooley operates programs allowing ABA-approved foreign study credit in Canada, Australia, and New Zealand. In addition, students are able to study at ABA-approved programs in Oxford, UK; Santander, Spain; Toronto, Canada; and Münster, Germany.

J.D. students are able to select from several specialized areas of legal study, known as "concentrations".

== Clinical programs ==
Cooley offers clinical programs at each campus. Students who participate in any of the Michigan clinics are allowed to practice law in Michigan under the Michigan Court Rules by representing clients in court, drafting client documents, and giving legal advice under the supervision of faculty. The Innocence Project is nationally recognized in the United States for helping free persons wrongfully incarcerated by obtaining DNA evidence and providing pro bono legal advocacy to overturn their convictions—Cooley's Innocence Project clinic has contributed to overturning four convictions. Cooley also offers an elder law clinic, Sixty Plus, Inc., which provides free legal services to senior citizens, as well as two Public Defender's clinics, which allow students to work in the Public Defender's office with indigent clients who are accused of committing a crime. The Access to Justice Clinic provides a general civil practice, focusing on family and consumer law. Free legal help in family law and domestic violence matters is offered at the Family Legal Assistance Project. Evening and weekend students can gain experience in the Estate Planning Clinics or the Public Sector Law Project, which provides civil legal services of a transactional, advisory, legislative or systemic nature to governments. Cooley offers externships throughout the United States at over 2600 approved externship sites. Student externs work under the supervision of experienced attorneys, with the guidance of full-time faculty.

== Costs ==
The total cost of attending Cooley (tuition, fees, and living expenses) for the 2022–2023 academic year is $66,706 to $69,506, depending on the campus. According to the research conducted by Law School Transparency in 2017, Cooley was one of the most at-risk law schools for exploiting students for tuition.

== Bar passage ==
Of the Cooley alumni who took the Michigan bar exam for the first time in July 2025, 40% passed versus a statewide average of 76%. The ultimate bar passage rate for Cooley alumni for those who sat for a bar examination within two years of their 2020 date of graduation was 61% compared to the 75% two year bar passage required by ABA Standard 316. Cooley previously failed to reach the 75% two year bar passage required by ABA Standard 316 in 2021, when Cooley had a 62.31% pass rate for 2018 graduates and a 66.01% passage rate for 2017 graduates. Thus, Cooley has failed to reach the 75% two year bar passage required of ABA Standard 316 for continued accreditation.

In May 2020, the council of the ABA's Section of Legal Education and Admissions to the Bar determined Cooley was among ten law schools that had failed to significantly comply with Standard 316, which was revised in 2019 to provide that at least 75% of an accredited law school's graduates who took a bar exam must pass one within two years of graduation. Cooley was asked to submit a report by February 2021. The report did not demonstrate compliance, and Cooley was asked to appear at the council's May 2021 meeting. Thereafter, effective 2025, Cooley was placed on probation by the ABA due to noncompliance with the required minimum two-year bar passage rate. It was found fully compliant in August 2025 and removed from probationary status.

== Post-graduation employment ==
In 2011, Cooley was one of 15 law schools sued in a series of unsuccessful class actions filed on behalf of former students alleging that they had been misled by deceptive statistics on employment and salary published by the schools. The case against Cooley was dismissed, as was a counter-suit by Cooley alleging libel, but the courts acknowledged that Cooley law grads' employment prospects were "dismal", that Cooley had the lowest admission standards of any law school in the country, with an acceptance rate 15% higher than the next-lowest law school, and that it had a high drop-out rate. The trial court observed in part that Cooley reporting a 76% employment rate was not objectively false, though it was based on survey returns rather than on all graduates, and that it did not distinguish between part- and full-time employment or legal vs non-legal jobs, and that "it would be unreasonable for Plaintiffs to rely on two-bare bones statistics in deciding to attend a bottom-tier law school with the lowest admission standard in the country".

According to disclosures now required by the ABA, 43.8% of graduates from the class of 2021 obtained full-time, long-term, bar-passage-required employment within nine months of graduation, while 20% of graduates were unemployed in any capacity nine months after graduation. Most bar–passage–required employment was in firms of 1–10 employees.

== Notable alumni ==
- James Altman: Catholic priest
- Rosemarie Aquilina: circuit court judge
- Chris Chocola: politician
- Michael Cohen: former lawyer for Donald Trump, disbarred
- Jon Cooper: college sports coach
- Kevin Cotter: politician
- Todd Courser: politician
- Alan Cropsey: politician
- Massimo F. D'Angelo: attorney
- Diane Dietz: college athletics
- Torren Ecker: politician
- John Engler: former Governor of Michigan
- Frank M. Fitzgerald: politician
- David Fleischer: judge
- A.T. Frank: judge
- Edward Gaffney: politician, transport industry
- Anthony H. Gair: (deceased) former New York City attorney
- Mark Grisanti: politician and judge
- Paul Hillegonds: politician and energy industry
- Jim Howell: politician
- Iqra Khalid: politician
- Joseph Lagana: politician
- Charles Macheers: politician
- Hiroe Makiyama: politician
- Jane Markey: judge
- Edward Mermelstein: attorney, real estate developer, news commentator
- Tedd Nesbit: politician
- Joseph P. Overton: political scientist
- Mark Plawecki: judge
- Ruby Sahota: politician
- Nicholas Scutari: politician
- Steve Stern: politician
- Bart Stupak: politician
- Rashida Harbi Tlaib: politician
- Sherry Walker: former Florida State Senator
