= David Fleischer (political scientist) =

Brazilian academic

David Verge Fleischer is an American-born Brazilian political scientist and professor.

Fleischer is professor emeritus at the University of Brasília, having taught there since 1972. He has also been a visiting professor at the University of Washington and the State University of New York.

Fleischer works with the Brazilian NGOs Instituto Sociedade, População e Natureza (ISPN) and Transparência, Consciência e Cidadania (TCC-Brasil).

Fleischer, working with Robert G. Wesson, published the book Brazil in Transition in 1983, highlighting the events that led up to the 1964 Brazilian coup d'état.
