= List of organisations banned in Russia =

This is a partial list of organisations that are officially banned in Russia as "extremist" or declared undesirable. Many organisations were banned based on the Russian foreign agent law and Russian undesirable organisations law. Among them were Open Russia, National Endowment for Democracy, Open Society Foundations, U.S. Russia Foundation, International Republican Institute, Media Development Investment Fund and National Democratic Institute.

== Banned organisations ==
=== Before 2014 ===
Organisation		Date when it was banned
	Communist Party of the Soviet Union	6 November 1991
	Communist Party of the Russian Soviet Federative Socialist Republic	6 November 1991
	National Salvation Front	4 October 1993
	Hizb ut-Tahrir	2003
	National Bolshevik Party	19 April 2007
	Conceptual Party "Unity"	13 July 2007
National Socialist Society 02	National Socialist Society	1 February 2010
	Slavic Union	27 April 2010
Caucasian Emirate	United Vilayat of Kabarda-Balkaria-Karachay	9 July 2010
	Takfir wal-Hijra	15 September 2010
	Format18	20 December 2010
	Russian National Unity	24 December 2010
Russia	Russian all-national union	30 May 2011
	Movement Against Illegal Immigration	18 April 2011
	People's Will Army	22 February 2011
	Northern Brotherhood	6 August 2012

=== After 2014 ===
Organisation		Date when it was banned
	International Republican Institute	Unknown
	National Democratic Institute	Unknown
	People's Militia named after Minin and Pozharsky	18 February 2015
People's Will Army	For Responsible Government	22 September 2015
Russia	Russians	28 October 2015
	National Endowment for Democracy	July 2015
	U.S. Russia Foundation	2015
	Media Development Investment Fund	2016
	Mejlis of the Crimean Tatar People	26 April 2016
	Open Russia	2017
	Artpodgotovka	26 October 2017
	Jehovah's Witnesses	20 April 2017
	Free Russia Forum	22 February 2019
Soviet Union	Union of Slavic Forces of Russia	19 August 2019
	Nation and Freedom Committee	29 July 2020
Germany	National Socialism / White Power	21 May 2021
	Anti-Corruption Foundation	9 June 2021
	Male State	18 October 2021
	Meta Platforms Inc	21 March 2022
	All-Tatar Public Center	10 June 2022
	Adat People's Movement	11 July 2022
	People's Self-Defense (Russia)	15 September 2022
	International LGBT movement	30 November 2023
	Anti-Russian separatist movement	7 July 2024
	The Satanic Temple	4 December 2024

== See also ==
- Federal List of Extremist Materials
