= 2011 Russian legislative election =

- 4 December 2011

All 450 seats in the State Duma 226 seats needed for a majority
- Turnout: 60.10% (▼3.61 pp)
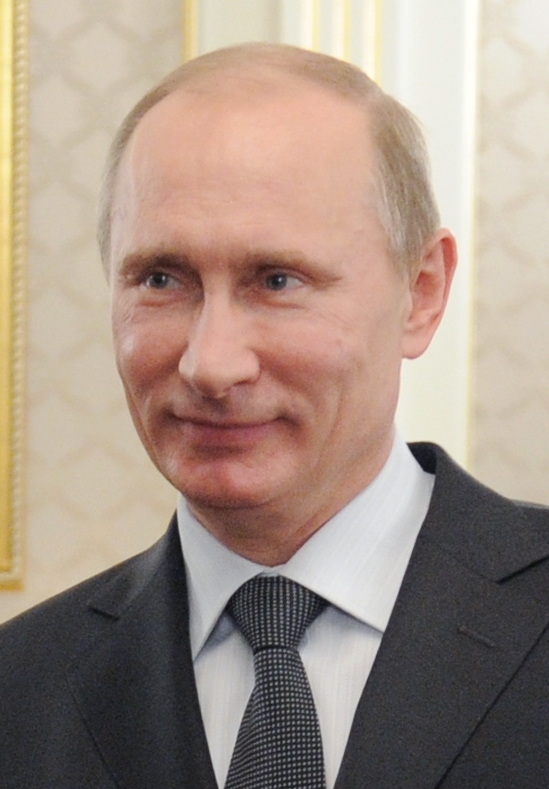

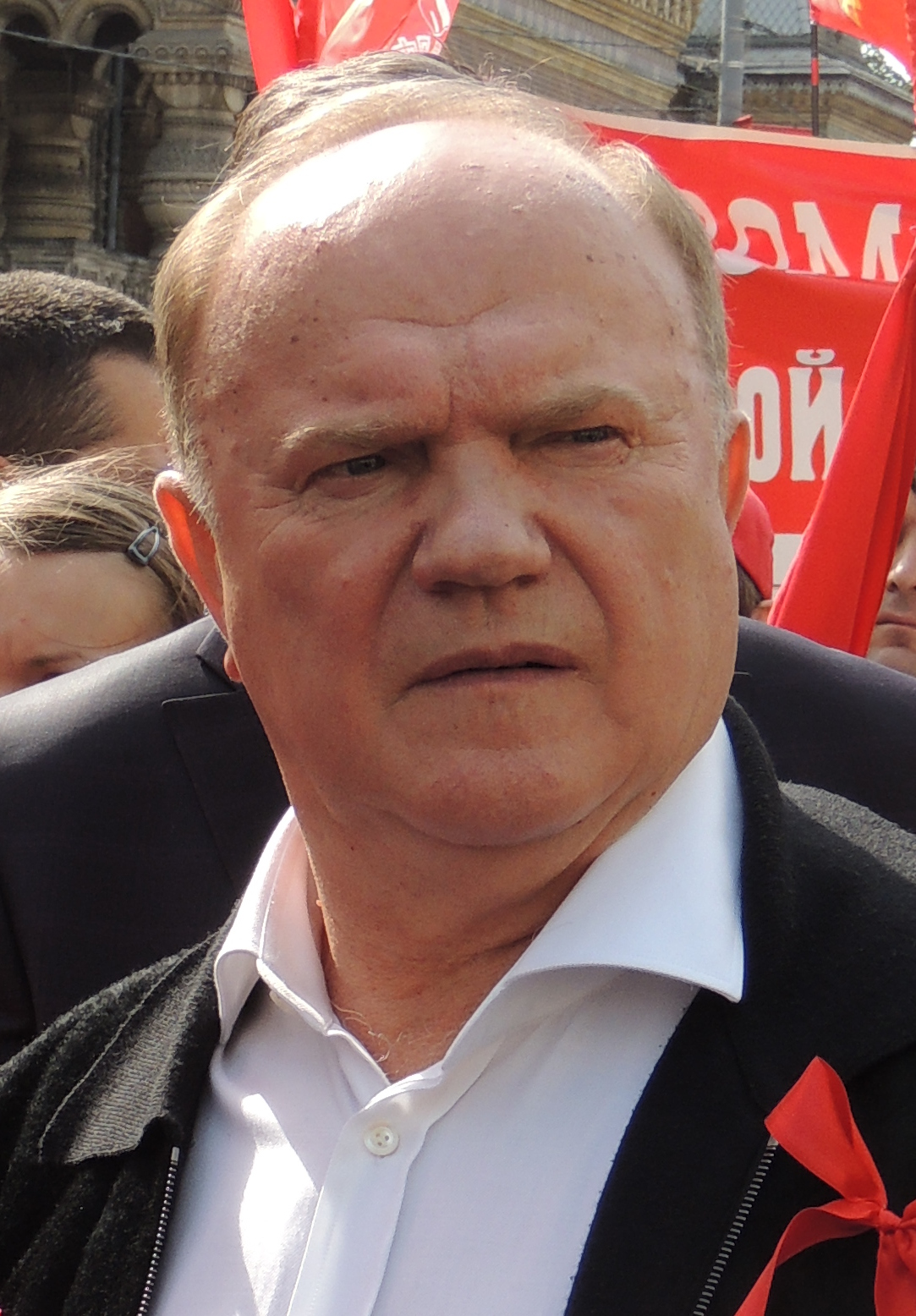

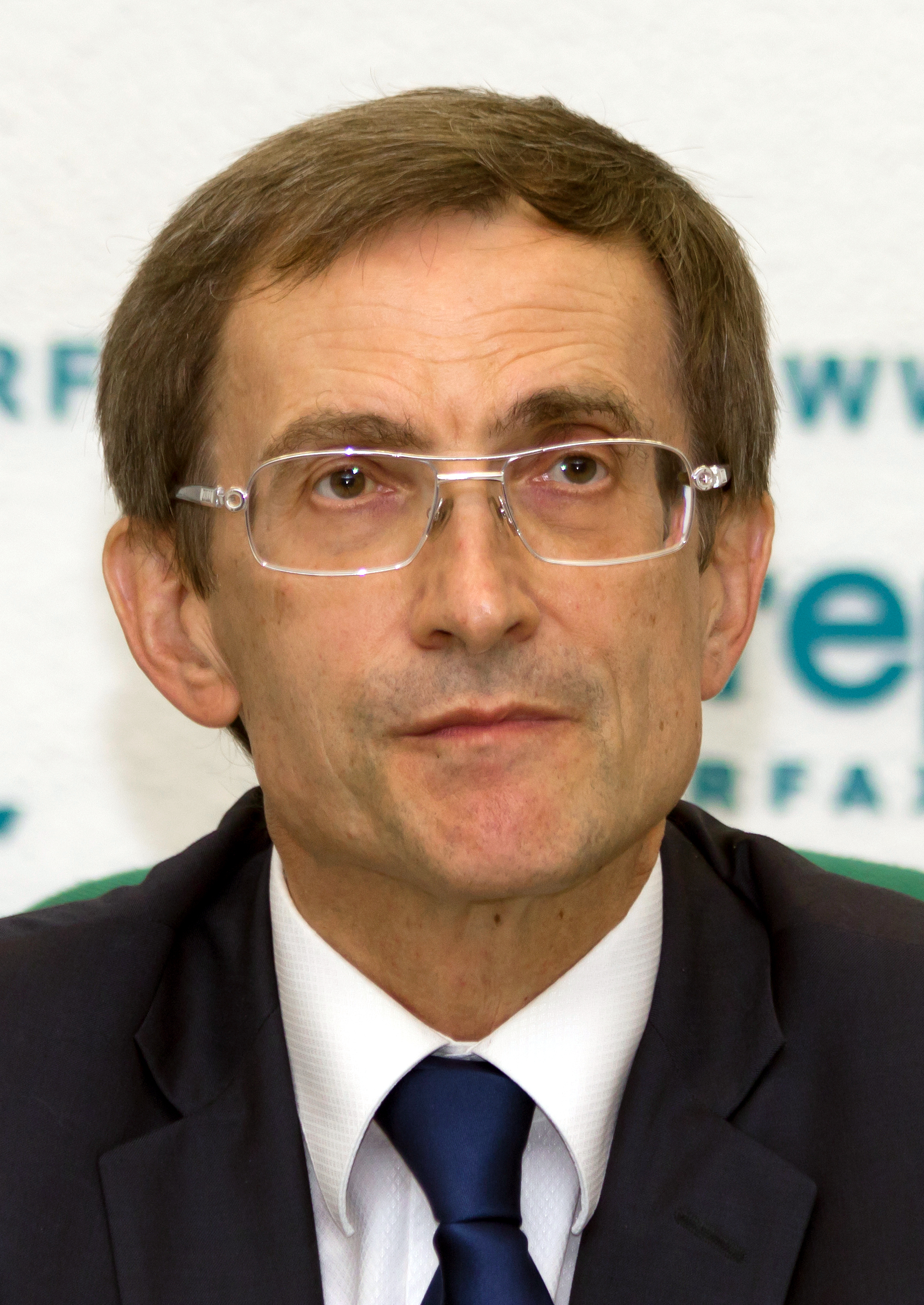

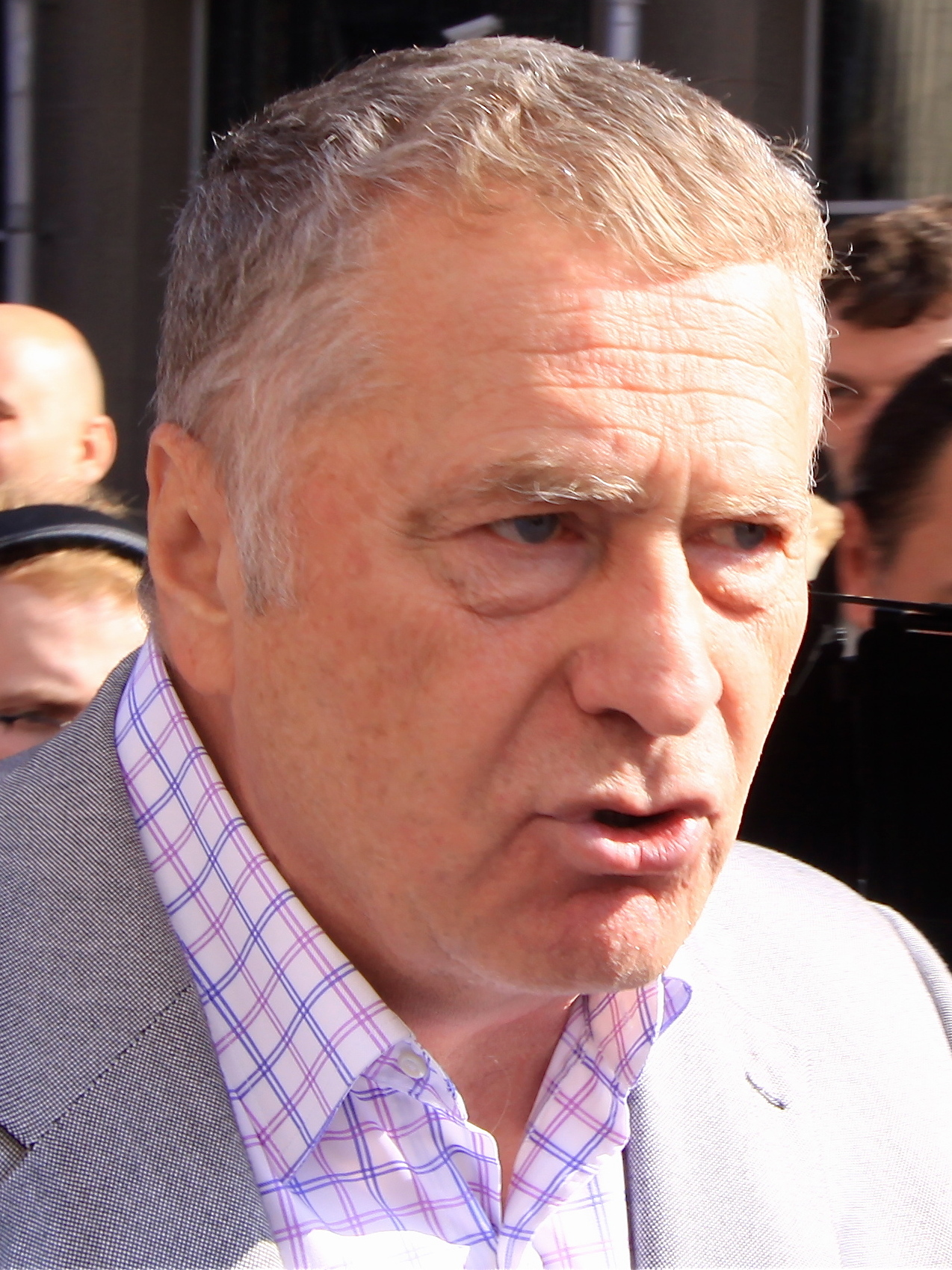
	First party	Second party
Leader	Vladimir Putin	Gennady Zyuganov
Party	United Russia	CPRF
Last election	64.30%, 315 seats	11.57%, 57 seats
Seats won	238	92
Seat change	▼77	▲35
Popular vote	32,379,135	12,599,507
Percentage	49.32%	19.19%
Swing	▼14.98pp	▲7.62pp
	Third party	Fourth party
Leader	Nikolai Levichev	Vladimir Zhirinovsky
Party	A Just Russia	LDPR
Last election	7.74%, 38 seats	8.14%, 40 seats
Seats won	64	56
Seat change	▲26	▲16
Popular vote	8,695,522	7,664,570
Percentage	13.24%	11.67%
Swing	▲5.50pp	▲3.53pp
- Results by constituency
Chairman before election
Boris Gryzlov
United Russia
Elected Chairman
Sergey Naryshkin
United Russia

Legislative elections were held in Russia on 4 December 2011. At stake were the 450 seats in the 6th State Duma, the lower house of the Federal Assembly (the legislature). United Russia won the elections with 49.32% of the vote, taking 238 seats or 52.88% of the Duma seats.

This result was down from 64.30% of the vote and 70% of the seats in the 2007 elections. The Communist Party of the Russian Federation received 19.19% of the vote and 92 seats, its best result since 1999, while A Just Russia received 13.24% and 64 seats, with the Liberal Democratic Party of Russia getting 56 seats with 11.67% of the vote. Yabloko, Patriots of Russia and Right Cause did not cross the 7% election threshold. The list of parties represented in the parliament did not change.

United Russia lost the two-thirds constitutional majority it had held prior to the election, but it still won a majority of seats in the Duma, even though it had slightly less than 50% of the popular vote. The Communist Party, Liberal Democratic Party and A Just Russia all gained new seats compared to the previous 2007 elections.

The election received various assessments from abroad: positive from the Commonwealth of Independent States observers, mixed from the Organization for Security and Co-operation in Europe and critical from some European Union representatives and the United States. Reports of election fraud and voter discontent with the current government led to major protests particularly in Moscow and Saint Petersburg. The government and United Russia were in their turn supported by rallies of the youth organizations Nashi and Young Guard of United Russia. Later, the actions of anti-government protesters sparked the fear of a colour revolution in Russian society, and a number of the "anti-Orange" protests were set up (the name alludes to the Orange Revolution in Ukraine, the most widely known color revolution to Russians) including one on the Poklonnaya Hill in Moscow, the largest protest action of all the protests so far according to the police.

The Central Electoral Commission issued a report on 3 February 2012, in which it said that it received a total of 1686 reports on irregularities, of which only 195 (11.5%) were confirmed true after investigation, a third (584) actually contained questions about the unclear points of electoral law, and only 60 complaints claimed falsifications of the elections results. On 4 February 2012 the Investigation Committee of the Office of the Prosecutor General of the Russian Federation announced that the majority of videos allegedly showing falsifications at polling stations were falsified themselves.

Statistical analysis of poll data have shown massive abnormalities that most researchers explain by mass-scale electoral fraud.

== Electoral system ==
The threshold for eligibility to win seats is 7.0 percent. In addition, a party which receives between 5.0 and 6.0 percent will get 1 seat in the Duma and those which receive between 6.0 and 7.0 percent will get 2 seats.

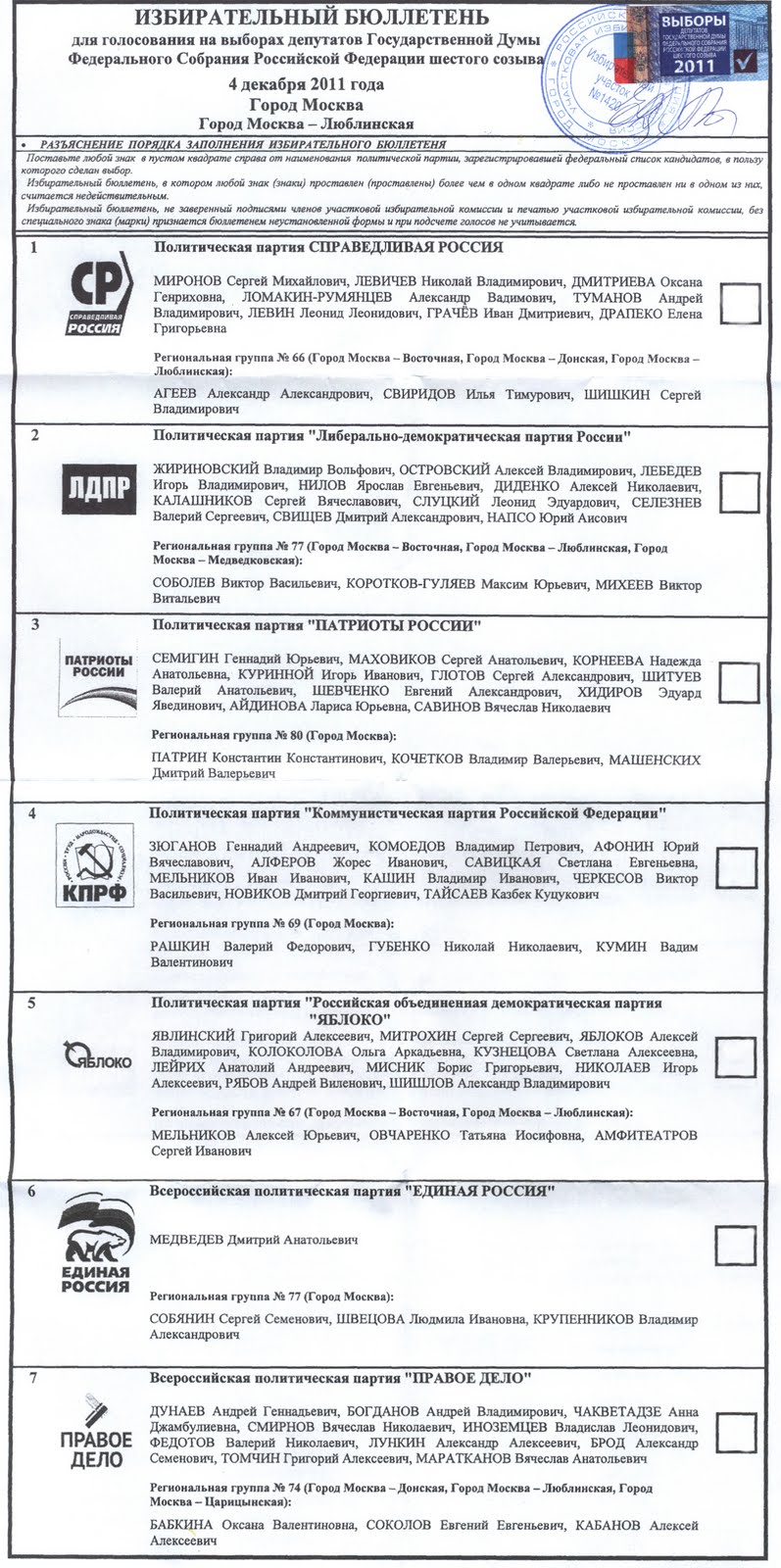
Ballot to the 2011 State Duma election with list of Political parties.

== Political parties ==
All seven registered political parties were approved to participate in the elections. Parties which were present in the State Duma (United Russia, Communist Party, Liberal Democratic Party and A Just Russia) were automatically eligible to participate in the elections. Other parties needed to present at least 150,000 signatures (with a maximum of 5000 signatures per region) to the Central Electoral Commission before 19 October.

Ballot number	Party	Party leader	No. 1 in party list	Conventions date	Ideology
1	A Just Russia	Nikolai Levichev	Sergey Mironov	24 September 2011	Social democracy, Democratic Socialism
2	Liberal Democratic Party of Russia	Vladimir Zhirinovsky	Vladimir Zhirinovsky	13 September 2011	Right-wing nationalism, Anti-Communism
3	Patriots of Russia	Gennady Semigin	Gennady Semigin	10 September 2011	Democratic Socialism, Left-wing Nationalism
4	Communist Party of the Russian Federation	Gennady Zyuganov	Gennady Zyuganov	24 September 2011	Communism, Left-wing nationalism
5	Yabloko	Sergey Mitrokhin	Grigory Yavlinsky	10–11 September 2011	Social liberalism, pro-Europeanism
6	United Russia	Vladimir Putin	Dmitry Medvedev	23–24 September 2011	Statism, Centrism
7	Right Cause	Andrey Dunaev	Andrey Dunaev	20 September 2011	Neoliberalism, Economic liberalism

== Campaign ==
There was relatively little sign of campaign activity on the ground: few posters, few street agitators, and few people gathering at non-United Russia campaign rallies. Candidates debates were often brief and aired at odd times of day (such as 7 a.m. on First Channel) and typically featured strange pairings of parties and not always the top figures on their party lists.

=== United Russia ===
The main parliamentary party, the ruling United Russia headed by Vladimir Putin (he is not a member of the party, yet he is its leader), went into the next elections with a renewed platform. Putin announced the creation of a pre-election People's Front to allow non-party candidates (up to 25%) to win election on the United Russia ticket. At the party conference which nominated Putin to the presidency and Medvedev to head the party list leader, the pre-election program was published, with 8 basic guidelines:

- Modernize the economy, the educational system, and the technical-military industry.
- Fulfill social obligations. Raise salaries, pensions, and increase grants. Combat poverty and modernize public health services.
- Eradicate corruption. Achieve transparency in bureaucrat's salaries, state purchases, and measures taken by ministries and departments.
- Strengthen the judicial system on the principles of independence, transparency, and justice. Make the penal code more humane on so-called economic crimes and toughen punishments for violent crime, most of for all crimes committed against children and for terrorist acts.
- Support international and interfaith peace. Fight against illegal migration, ethnic crime, and displays of xenophobia and separatism. Support the free growth of all cultures and all confessional traditions of the peoples of Russia.
- Develop a modern political system which will allow everyone including the smallest social groups to be heard and included in state and social administration processes and to be assured that there are no people without rights or protections in the country.
- Ensure our internal and external security with an effective police force and a powerful Armed Forces. Raise the prestige of serving in the army, the navy, and law enforcement agencies.
- An independent and rational domestic policy ultimately pursues only one goal: to improve the welfare of the people and to guarantee their safety. Our integration projects must create new possibilities for development, for citizens and for business. The customs union between Russia, Belarus, and Kazakhstan is working. A united economic space will become a reality starting 1 January of next year, leading to an even deeper degree of integration. And then we will advance even further to the creation of the Eurasian Union.

This program was reportedly constructed from excerpts taken from speeches previously given by Prime Minister Putin and President Medvedev.

United Russia Party Chairman Putin and party list leader Medvedev did not participate in them at all. Television campaign ads were not frequently aired, and what ads that ran tended to be of strikingly low production value.

=== A Just Russia ===
A Just Russia (Russian: Spravedlivaya Rossia) hoped that being "persecuted by the authorities" will give it a more useful oppositional image. The party managed to turn itself into a credible receptacle for anti-United Russia votes through an aggressive campaign attacking the party. While some of its critical ads were blocked, it still managed to air others that blasted official corruption and declared that "swindlers and thieves" (a clear implicit reference to United Russia) were not needed.

=== Communist Party ===
In its programme entitled "The majority is destined to win. Return the Motherland stolen from us!", the CPRF promoted a stronger role of the state in the political and social sphere and the nationalization of mineral resources and other raw materials. It called for a re-appraisal of Russia's foreign policy posture, the creation of a 'Union of Brotherhood' on the territory of the former Soviet Union, a stronger role for the United Nations and the dissolution of NATO. The CPRF demanded 'genuine democratisation' of the Russian political system including a stronger role for the parliament, the restoration of regional elections, and the confiscation of property acquired through corruption. It tasked itself with representing the 'patriotic majority' of the population in the parliament and with making sure that executive power is being exercised for the sake of the common good.

=== Liberal Democratic party ===
In the run-up to this election, the party had been highlighting the need to defend the interests of ethnic Russians, although it had generally been careful not to cross the line into openly nationalist rhetoric.

== Opinion polls ==
United Russia CPRF LDPR A Just Russia Yabloko Right Cause

Polling firm	Fieldwork date	United Russia	Communist Party	Liberal Democratic Party	A Just Russia	Yabloko	Patriots of Russia	Right Cause
VCIOM	November 2010	62.9%	11.9%	6.9%	8.9%	3.9%	2.8%	2.6%
Levada	January 2011	57%	20%	9%	6%	<1%	<1%	<1%
Levada	February 2011	60%	16%	11%	4%	1%	<1%	<1%
Levada	March 2011	57%	18%	10%	7%	1%	<1%	<1%
Levada	April 2011	55%	18%	12%	6%	2%	<1%	<1%
VCIOM	April 2011	58.7%	13.6%	9.1%	9.8%	2.7%	1.8%	2.9%
Levada	May 2011	57%	17%	14%	4%	1%	<1%	<1%
Levada	June 2011	53%	17%	13%	5%	1%	1%	2%
VCIOM	June 2011	58.3%	14.7%	9.8%	7.3%	2.8%	1.9%	4.1%
Levada	July 2011	54%	18%	12%	7%	2%	<1%	2%
Levada	August 2011	54%	18%	13%	6%	1%	1%	3%
VCIOM	August 2011	55.0%	16.4%	10.8%	7.1%	2.5%	2.1%	4.9%
Levada	September 2011	57%	16%	12%	6%	3%	1%	2%
Levada	30 September– 2 October 2011	59%	18%	9%	7%	1%	1%	2%
VCIOM	October 2011	53.8%	17.1%	11.3%	7.9%	3.3%	2.0%	2.1%
Levada	21–24 October 2011	60%	17%	11%	5%	2%	<1%	1%
Levada	28 October– 1 November 2011	51%	20%	14%	7%	4%	<1%	1%
VCIOM	7 November 2011	53.3%	17.4%	12%	8.3%	3.3%	1.8%	2.2%
Levada	11 November 2011	53%	20%	12%	9%	1%	<1%	1%
VCIOM	19–20 November 2011	53.7%	16.7%	11.6%	10%	2.9%	1.6%	1.7%

== Conduct ==
=== Alleged foreign involvement ===
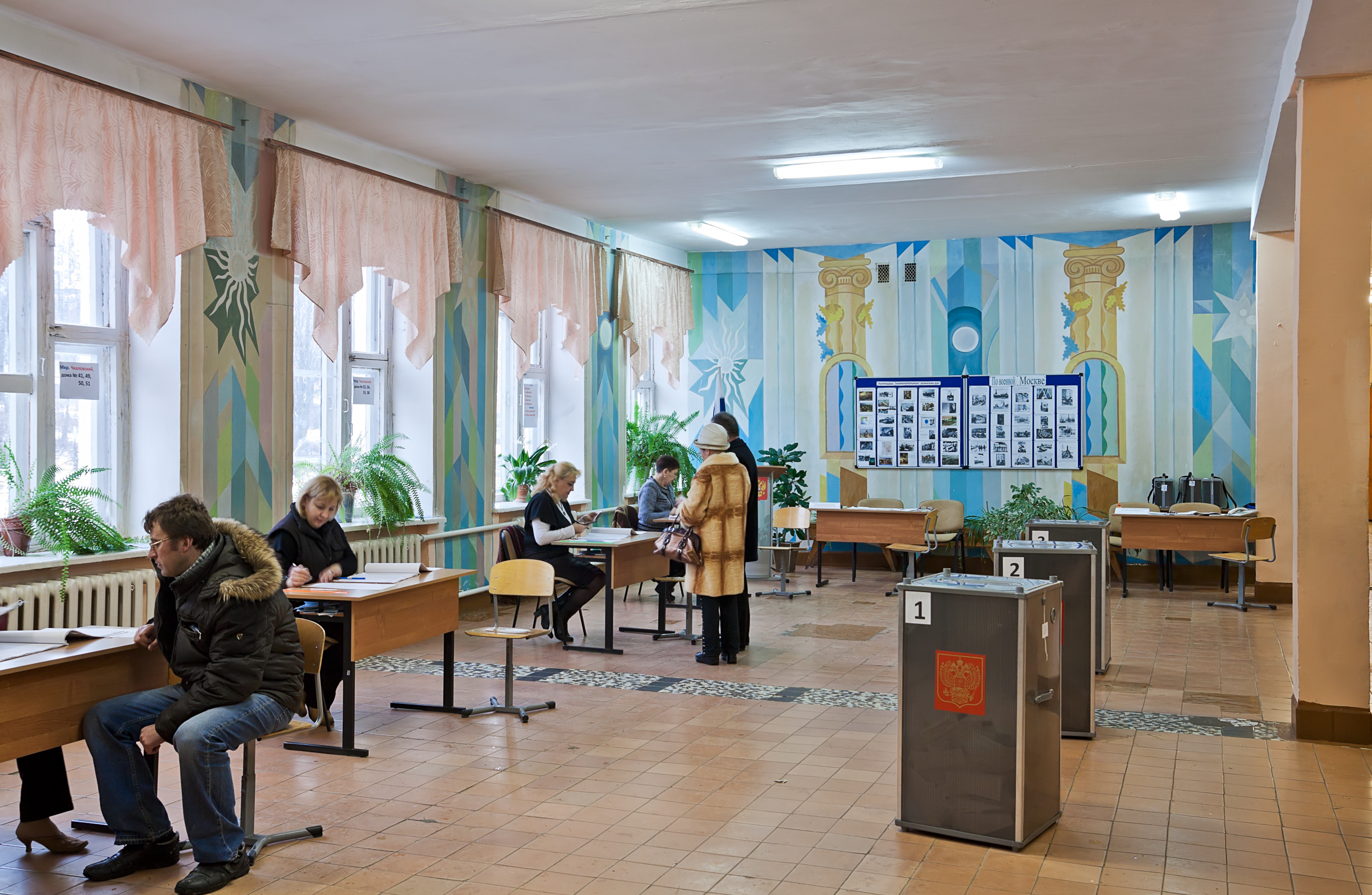
Election ballots in Pereslavl

In the pre-election campaign period the GOLOS Association watchdog was the largest organization independent from participating parties that reported on campaign violations. The online service it set up to collect reports recorded 5,300 complaints regarding violations of electoral law. Most of the violations were linked to United Russia and about a third of the complaints were from state employees and students who said they were pressured by their employers/professors to vote for United Russia.

On 1 December 2011 prosecutors in Moscow served GOLOS with papers alleging that the organisation had portrayed an unnamed political party in a bad light. The unnamed party has been identified as being United Russia. On 2 November a Moscow court fined GOLOS 30 000 roubles (then about US$1000) for violations of the electoral law of Russia.

On 8 December, the news portal Life claimed it had received access to 60 Mb of correspondence between GOLOS administration and USAID (a federal government agency of the United States), and correspondence between GOLOS administration and its activists. The correspondence showed reports to USAID on how USAID funds received by GOLOS were spent. Also, the correspondence showed that activists received money for working on every report about a violation. Earlier, on 2 December, NTV channel showed an investigative documentary film, "Голос ниоткуда" (Golos niotkuda, translated as "Voice from nowhere" or "Vote from nowhere"), accusing GOLOS of making propaganda paid for by foreign money, in particular from the United States.

=== Irregularities ===
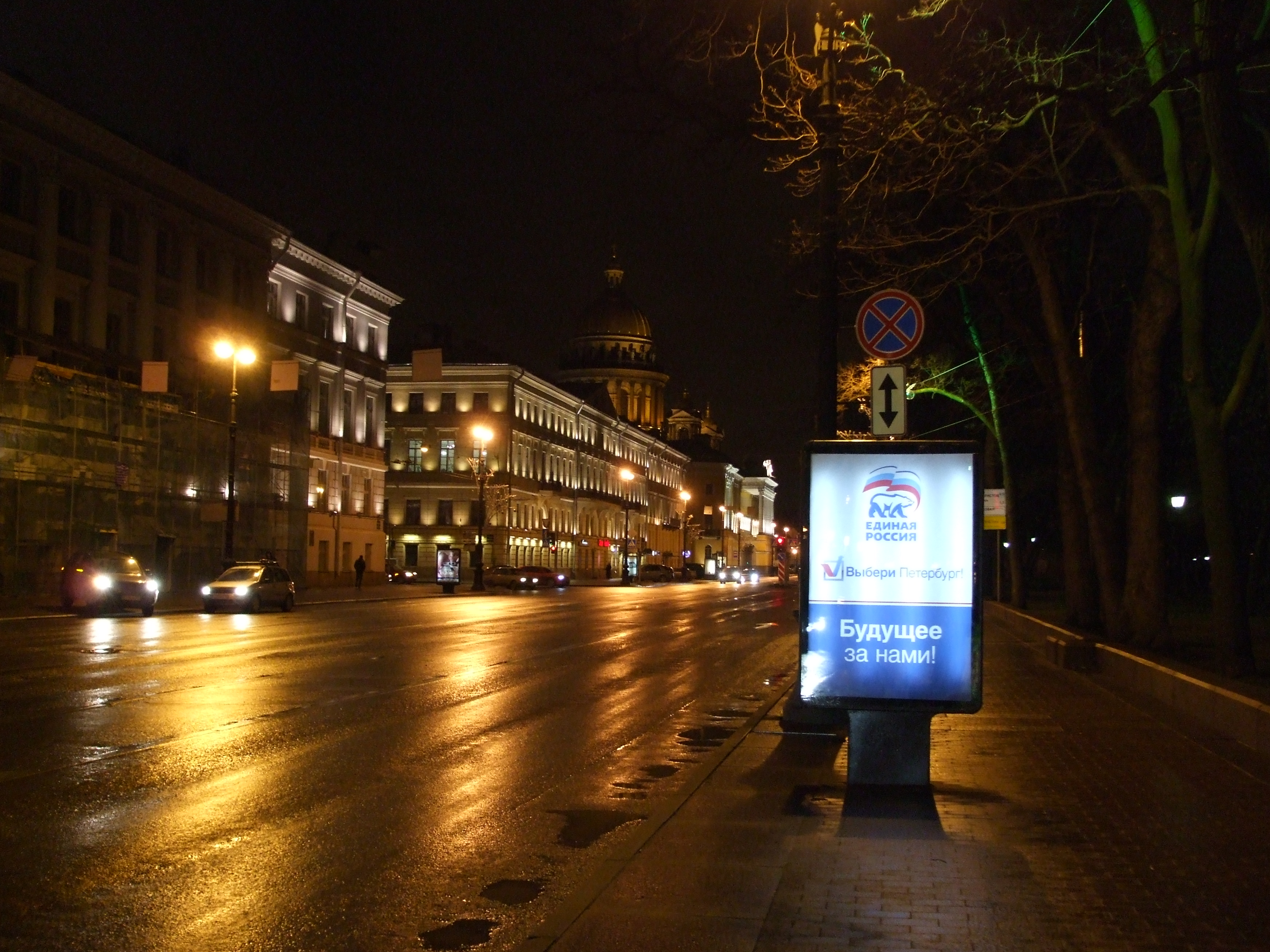
One of many United Russia posters in St. Petersburg on election day, 4 December 2011

During and after the election international media and local independent websites reported serious irregularities during the election, including ballot stuffing, misuse of state resources, media bias and lack of impartiality by the election commission. The Russian state-owned news agency RIA Novosti reported more than 1,100 official complaints filed of election irregularities across the country, including vote fraud, obstruction of observers and illegal campaigning.

==== Reports by participating parties ====
Members of the A Just Russia, Yabloko and Communist parties reported that certain voters were shuttled between polling stations, casting several ballots. The Yabloko and Liberal Democratic parties reported that some of their observers had been banned from witnessing the sealing of the ballot boxes and from gathering video footage, and others groundlessly expelled from polling stations.

==== Reports by independent groups and observers ====
At a number of polling stations throughout the country, observers reported that final results published by the Central Election Commission differed drastically from results recorded by observers, with the "official" numbers sometimes showing the United Russia vote inflated by a factor of two or three. Carousel voting was also observed in a number of areas.

In Moscow, the opposition activist group Citizen Observer estimated that United Russia had stolen 17% of the popular vote from other parties.

In Saint Petersburg, independent activist group Right to Elect ("Право выбора") attempted to register all differences between observers' protocols and the data of the Central Election Commission. They found that comparable shares of differences in votes were in favour not only of the United Russia, but of CPRF and LDPR parties as well (2.68%, 1.49% and 2.67% respectively as of the data on 13 December).

==== Reports by international observers ====
International observers from the Organization for Security and Co-operation in Europe (OSCE) documented multiple violations of electoral law. They found that whilst the preparations for the elections were technically well administered, they were marked by a "convergence of the State and the governing party". They said they witnessed "undue interference of state authorities", "partiality of most media" and "lack of independence of the election administration". Denying registration to some political parties narrowed political competition, according to the OSCE. The OCSE concluded that "This...did not provide the necessary conditions for fair electoral competition." However, international observers from the Commonwealth of Independent States reported that the elections "were held legally and without serious violations." Yet given government's control over the Central Electoral Commission and the exclusion of multiple independent observers from participation in monitoring voting and vote tabulation, it is exceedingly difficult to assess the degree of falsification in the election.

==== Official reaction to the reports on irregularities ====
According to Vladimir Putin's Press Secretary, Dmitry Peskov, the known accumulated volume of all reports on falsifications affects no more than 0.5% of total votes, and so this could not be a basis to reconsider the results of the elections.

Russia's President Dmitry Medvedev called for an investigation of all reports on irregularities, but voiced his disagreement with slogans and calls by the protesters on the post-election meetings.

Yury Chaika, the Prosecutor General of Russia, said that the data on falsifications will be analyzed, but said also that violations were local and didn't affect the overall result, and that therefore there is no reason to cancel the results of the elections.

==== Other irregularities ====
Various Russian liberal news websites reported experiencing denial of service attacks on the day of the election. United Russia was able to score 99.48% in the Chechen Republic and got to a lesser degree similar results in the neighbouring republics, a curiosity which was picked up by a number of international newspapers.

The group's leader Lilya Shibanova was detained for twelve hours at Moscow's Sheremetyevo airport on 2 December, and released only after giving her laptop to security personnel there.

=== Investigation of the reports on irregularities ===
==== Official reports to the Central Electoral Commission ====
The Central Electoral Commission issued a report on 3 February 2012, in which it said that it received the total of 1686 reports on irregularities, of which only 195 (11.5%) were confirmed true after investigation. About a third of reports (584) actually contained questions about the unclear points of electoral law rather than reports of irregularities, and there were only 60 complaints claiming falsifications of the elections results.

Type of reports	Number
Claims of illegal campaigning	265
Claims of illegal actions on elections day	235
Questions about the unclear points of electoral law	584
Claims of usage of the 'administrative resource'	110
Claims of falsification of the results	60
Total reports	1686
Confirmed reports	195

==== Investigation of videos ====
On 4 February 2012 the Investigation Committee of the Office of the Prosecutor General of the Russian Federation announced that the majority of videos allegedly showing falsifications at polling stations were in fact falsified and originally distributed from a single server in California. However, others (such as GOLOS) pointed out firstly, that 'falsification' was deemed to be 'editing' ('монтаж') – something unavoidable in fitting potentially hours of footage into a short internet clip, and secondly that "the server in California" might actually just be YouTube.

== Results ==
United Russia won the elections with a 49.32% share of votes (238 seats; 52.88% of Duma seats), down from 64.30% (70% of seats) in the 2007 elections. The Communist Party of the Russian Federation received 19.19% (92 seats), while the Liberal Democratic Party of Russia got 11.67% (56 seats) and A Just Russia 13.24% (64 seats). Other parties did not cross the 7% election threshold, and the list of parties in the parliament did not change.

United Russia lost its two-thirds constitutional majority, but still won an absolute majority. The Communist Party, Liberal Democratic Party and A Just Russia all got a higher level of representation in the parliament compared to the previous 2007 elections.

Party	Votes	%	Seats	+/–
United Russia	32,379,135	50.10	238	–77
Communist Party	12,599,507	19.50	92	+35
A Just Russia	8,695,522	13.46	64	+26
Liberal Democratic Party	7,664,570	11.86	56	+16
Yabloko	2,252,403	3.49	0	0
Patriots of Russia	639,119	0.99	0	0
Right Cause	392,806	0.61	0	0
Total	64,623,062	100.00	450	0
Valid votes	64,623,062	98.43		
Invalid/blank votes	1,033,464	1.57		
Total votes	65,656,526	100.00		
Registered voters/turnout	109,237,780	60.10		
Source: CEC

=== By region ===
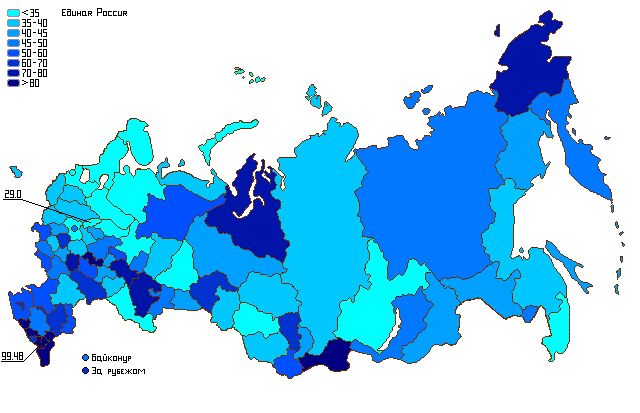
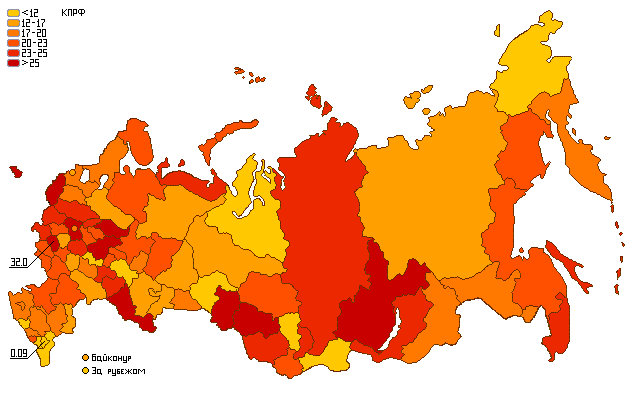
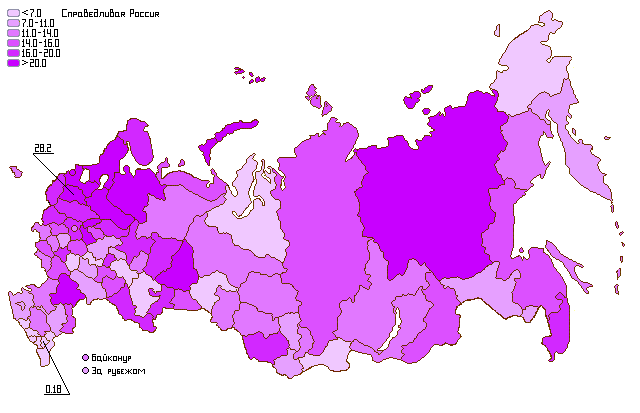
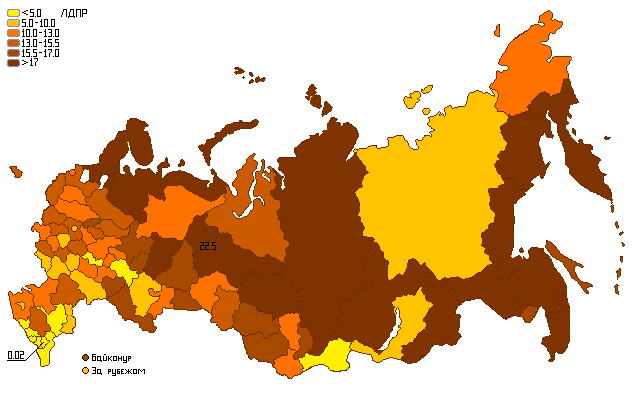
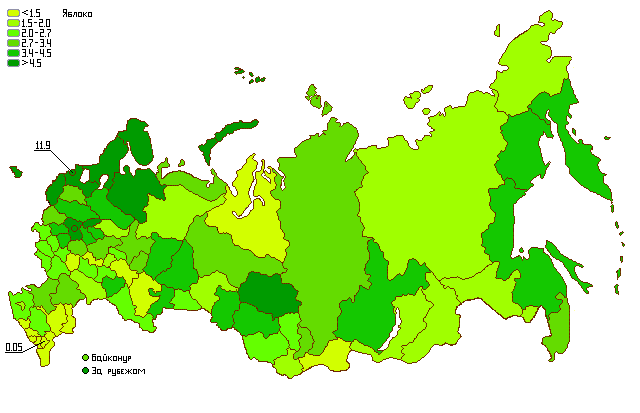
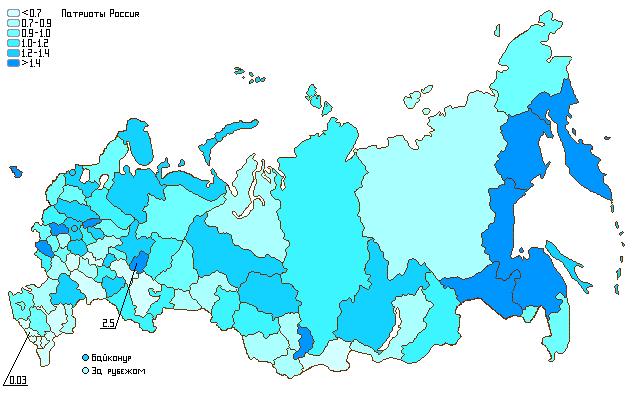
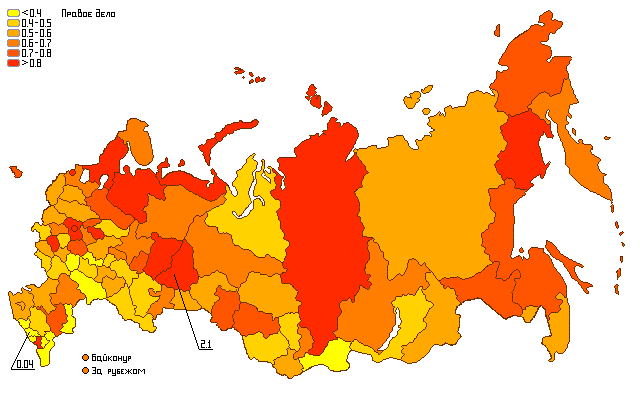
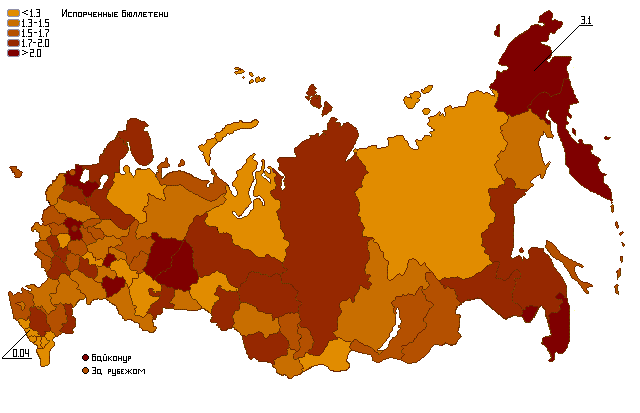
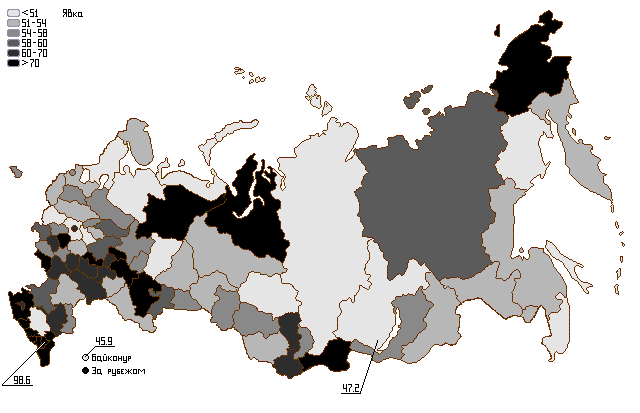

Region	Turnout	UR	CPRF	SR	LDPR	Yabloko	PR	RC	Invalid ballots
Adygea	65.9%	61.0%	18.2%	8.5%	7.8%	1.8%	0.9%	0.5%	1.4%
Altai Republic	62.8%	53.3%	21.5%	10.3%	10.6%	1.5%	0.8%	0.5%	1.3%
Bashkortostan	79.3%	70.5%	15.6%	5.5%	5.2%	1.2%	0.5%	0.4%	1.0%
Buryatia	56.7%	49.0%	24.3%	12.6%	9.5%	1.9%	0.8%	0.4%	1.5%
Chechnya	98.6%	99.48%	0.09%	0.18%	0.02%	0.05%	0.07%	0.04%	0.07%
Chuvashia	61.6%	43.4%	20.9%	18.8%	10.7%	1.6%	1.3%	0.4%	2.9%
Dagestan	81.1%	82.8%	11.3%	2.7%	1.9%	0.4%	0.3%	0.1%	0.4%
Ingushetia	86.2%	91.0%	2.9%	2.3%	0.4%	0.8%	0.3%	1.5%	0.8%
Kabardino-Balkaria	98.2%	81.3%	18.2%	0.2%	0.08%	0.07%	0.03%	0.04%	0.04%
Kalmykia	63.2%	66.1%	18.4%	7.2%	4.0%	1.4%	0.6%	0.7%	1.6%
Karachay-Cherkessia	93.2%	89.8%	8.8%	0.5%	0.3%	0.1%	0.1%	0.1%	0.2%
Karelia	50.2%	32.3%	19.3%	20.6%	17.9%	6.2%	0.9%	0.9%	1.9%
Khakassia	56.2%	40.1%	23.6%	13.7%	16.0%	2.7%	1.6%	0.6%	1.6%
Komi	70.5%	58.8%	13.5%	11.5%	11.9%	1.5%	0.9%	0.6%	1.3%
Mari El	71.3%	52.2%	20.7%	10.6%	11.7%	2.0%	0.9%	0.6%	1.3%
Mordovia	94.2%	91.6%	4.5%	1.3%	1.5%	0.3%	0.1%	0.1%	0.5%
North Ossetia	85.6%	67.9%	21.7%	6.0%	2.2%	0.3%	0.4%	0.3%	1.2%
Tatarstan	79.5%	77.8%	10.6%	5.3%	3.5%	1.1%	0.4%	0.4%	0.9%
Tuva	83.7%	85.3%	3.9%	6.7%	2.1%	0.5%	0.3%	0.2%	1.0%
Udmurtia	56.6%	45.1%	19.5%	11.2%	16.6%	2.8%	2.5%	0.7%	1.5%
Yakutia	59.3%	49.2%	16.4%	21.8%	8.5%	1.7%	0.8%	0.5%	1.2%
Altai Krai	51.4%	37.2%	24.7%	16.1%	16.6%	2.4%	0.7%	0.4%	1.9%
Kamchatka Krai	53.1%	45.3%	17.1%	10.1%	18.6%	4.1%	2.2%	0.6%	2.1%
Khabarovsk Krai	53.0%	38.1%	20.5%	14.1%	19.8%	3.7%	1.4%	0.7%	1.7%
Krasnodar Krai	72.8%	56.3%	17.5%	10.8%	10.4%	2.0%	0.9%	0.5%	1.6%
Krasnoyarsk Krai	49.4%	36.7%	23.6%	15.9%	17.0%	3.2%	1.0%	0.9%	1.8%
Perm Krai	48.0%	36.3%	21.0%	16.4%	17.9%	4.3%	1.1%	0.8%	2.2%
Primorsky Krai	48.8%	33.3%	23.2%	18.1%	18.7%	3.0%	0.9%	0.5%	2.4%
Stavropol Krai	50.8%	49.2%	18.4%	11.8%	15.3%	2.1%	0.9%	0.4%	1.9%
Zabaykalsky Krai	53.6%	43.3%	18.6%	14.1%	19.2%	1.7%	1.1%	0.5%	1.5%
Amur Oblast	53.7%	43.5%	19.2%	10.3%	21.0%	1.9%	1.7%	0.7%	1.7%
Arkhangelsk Oblast	49.8%	31.9%	20.2%	22.1%	18.2%	4.5%	1.2%	0.8%	1.2%
Astrakhan Oblast	55.6%	58.1%	14.3%	15.2%	8.5%	1.0%	0.7%	0.3%	1.7%
Belgorod Oblast	75.5%	51.2%	22.4%	11.6%	9.6%	2.1%	1.0%	0.4%	1.6%
Bryansk Oblast	59.9%	50.1%	23.3%	11.2%	10.6%	2.0%	0.9%	0.4%	1.4%
Chelyabinsk Oblast	59.5%	49.4%	14.9%	16.9%	12.1%	3.5%	1.0%	0.6%	1.7%
Irkutsk Oblast	47.2%	34.9%	27.8%	13.4%	17.3%	3.4%	1.2%	0.6%	1.4%
Ivanovo Oblast	52.9%	40.1%	22.5%	15.6%	14.8%	3.5%	1.2%	0.8%	1.5%
Kaliningrad Oblast	54.6%	37.1%	25.5%	13.3%	14.1%	5.5%	2.2%	0.7%	1.6%
Kaluga Oblast	57.5%	40.5%	21.9%	15.6%	14.4%	4.1%	1.4%	0.6%	1.6%
Kemerovo Oblast	69.7%	64.6%	10.5%	7.9%	12.1%	2.2%	0.8%	0.4%	1.5%
Kirov Oblast	54.1%	34.9%	22.7%	19.8%	16.7%	2.7%	1.2%	0.6%	1.5%
Kostroma Oblast	58.6%	34.2%	28.0%	18.0%	15.4%	1.8%	0.9%	0.4%	1.3%
Kurgan Oblast	56.5%	44.4%	19.6%	14.5%	16.9%	2.0%	0.8%	0.5%	1.3%
Kursk Oblast	54.7%	45.7%	20.7%	14.4%	13.5%	2.3%	1.4%	0.5%	1.5%
Leningrad Oblast	51.8%	33.7%	17.3%	25.1%	14.7%	4.9%	1.2%	0.6%	2.5%
Lipetsk Oblast	57.1%	40.3%	22.8%	16.6%	14.3%	2.5%	0.9%	0.5%	1.9%
Magadan Oblast	50.6%	41.0%	22.8%	11.6%	17.4%	3.5%	1.9%	0.8%	1.3%
Moscow Oblast	50.7%	32.5%	25.9%	16.0%	14.4%	6.1%	1.3%	1.0%	2.8%
Murmansk Oblast	51.8%	32.0%	21.8%	19.7%	18.1%	4.7%	1.2%	0.6%	1.9%
Nizhny Novgorod Oblast	59.2%	45.0%	28.5%	10.5%	10.6%	2.8%	0.8%	0.5%	1.3%
Novgorod Oblast	56.7%	35.3%	19.0%	28.2%	11.6%	2.7%	0.9%	0.5%	1.8%
Novosibirsk Oblast	56.8%	33.8%	30.3%	12.7%	15.7%	4.3%	1.1%	0.7%	1.4%
Omsk Oblast	55.7%	39.6%	25.6%	13.4%	14.2%	3.5%	1.0%	0.7%	1.9%
Orenburg Oblast	51.2%	34.9%	26.2%	16.8%	16.9%	2.4%	1.0%	0.4%	1.4%
Oryol Oblast	64.7%	38.9%	32.0%	11.2%	12.2%	2.1%	0.9%	0.8%	1.8%
Penza Oblast	64.9%	56.3%	19.8%	8.7%	10.1%	2.1%	0.7%	0.4%	1.9%
Pskov Oblast	52.9%	36.7%	25.1%	16.4%	13.9%	5.1%	0.9%	0.5%	1.4%
Rostov Oblast	59.4%	50.2%	20.8%	13.3%	10.2%	2.9%	0.8%	0.5%	1.3%
Ryazan Oblast	52.7%	39.8%	23.6%	15.1%	15.1%	3.1%	1.2%	0.7%	1.6%
Sakhalin Oblast	48.7%	41.9%	23.4%	11.8%	16.0%	3.4%	1.2%	0.7%	1.6%
Samara Oblast	52.9%	39.1%	23.3%	14.5%	15.8%	3.8%	1.2%	0.5%	2.0%
Saratov Oblast	67.2%	64.9%	13.8%	10.1%	7.2%	1.7%	0.6%	0.3%	1.4%
Smolensk Oblast	49.6%	36.2%	24.2%	18.6%	14.8%	2.9%	1.1%	0.5%	1.6%
Sverdlovsk Oblast	51.0%	32.7%	16.8%	24.7%	16.0%	4.3%	0.9%	2.1%	2.5%
Tambov Oblast	68.3%	66.7%	16.5%	6.0%	7.1%	1.4%	0.5%	0.3%	1.5%
Tomsk Oblast	50.5%	37.5%	22.4%	13.4%	17.8%	4.7%	1.3%	1.0%	1.9%
Tula Oblast	72.8%	61.3%	15.1%	8.5%	9.2%	3.5%	0.8%	0.4%	1.2%
Tver Oblast	53.4%	38.4%	23.2%	19.8%	11.7%	3.8%	1.2%	0.5%	1.3%
Tyumen Oblast	53.1%	65.1%	11.2%	6.8%	12.9%	1.7%	0.8%	0.5%	1.0%
Ulyanovsk Oblast	60.4%	43.6%	23.1%	15.6%	12.6%	2.3%	1.0%	0.5%	1.4%
Vladimir Oblast	48.9%	38.3%	20.5%	21.5%	12.9%	3.5%	1.1%	0.6%	1.5%
Volgograd Oblast	51.8%	36.2%	22.9%	21.3%	13.3%	3.3%	1.1%	0.6%	1.4%
Vologda Oblast	56.3%	33.4%	16.8%	27.1%	15.4%	3.5%	1.3%	0.7%	1.8%
Voronezh Oblast	64.3%	49.5%	21.8%	14.4%	8.8%	2.2%	0.8%	0.4%	1.9%
Yaroslavl Oblast	55.9%	29.0%	24.0%	22.6%	15.5%	4.8%	1.8%	0.7%	1.6%
Moscow	61.7%	46.6%	19.3%	12.1%	9.4%	8.5%	1.3%	0.8%	1.7%
Saint Petersburg	54.5%	35.4%	15.3%	23.7%	10.3%	11.6%	1.2%	0.9%	1.6%
Jewish Autonomous Oblast	52.0%	48.1%	19.8%	10.5%	15.7%	1.9%	0.9%	0.5%	2.5%
Chukotka	74.2%	70.3%	6.7%	5.4%	11.2%	1.7%	0.9%	0.7%	3.1%
Khanty-Mansi Autonomous Okrug	53.1%	41.0%	16.1%	13.8%	22.5%	2.8%	1.3%	0.6%	1.8%
Nenets Autonomous Okrug	48.0%	36.0%	24.8%	15.0%	17.5%	2.8%	1.3%	1.1%	1.5%
Yamalo-Nenets Autonomous Okrug	75.6%	71.7%	6.6%	4.7%	13.6%	1.2%	0.7%	0.4%	1.1%
Baikonur	45.9%	48.4%	16.3%	11.9%	15.6%	2.9%	1.3%	0.6%	2.8%
Total	60.2%	49.3%	19.2%	13.3%	11.7%	3.4%	1.0%	0.6%	1.6%

== Reactions ==
- Russia: President Dmitry Medvedev has called for an investigation into the alleged fraud, but played down concerns, stating that "It's time to give the new parliament a chance to work and, of course, to investigate everything that happened."
- Russia: Prime Minister Vladimir Putin said that Hillary Clinton "set the tone for some opposition activists" to act "in accordance with a well-known scenario and in their own mercenary political interests ... our people do not want the situation in Russia to develop like it was in Kyrgyzstan or not so long ago in Ukraine." He said that "it is unacceptable when foreign money is pumped into election processes" and that Russia's sovereignty should be defended from foreign interference. Putin also claimed that elections in the U. S. are much less liberal than in Russia and less open to independent observers.
- Mikhail Gorbachev, the final Soviet leader, has called for new elections and stated that the election was slanted in favour of United Russia. He has demanded a rerun, stating: "The country's leaders must admit there were numerous falsifications and rigging and the results do not reflect the peoples' will." He added: "I think [Russia's leaders] can only take one decision – annul the results of the election and hold a new one."
- United States: Secretary of State Hillary Clinton said on a trip to Vienna that Russia's election was "neither free, nor fair" and that there were "serious concerns" about the fairness of the election. The Ministry of Foreign Affairs of Russia called Clinton's and other U.S. officials' comments "unacceptable", and criticized the American support of "stereotypes" and the "placement of labels" without proper attempts at a serious analysis of the electoral situation in Russia. The Ministry also criticized the United States' own electoral system.

== Aftermath ==
On 4 November 2011, a month before elections, during the annual "Russian March" event representatives of the nationalist The Russians movement declared a protest action to begin on the election day after polling closes. As there was no official rally permit, the action was unapproved. It took place on 4 December at 21.00 in Moscow. Spokesman Alexander Belov declared the beginning of the «Putin, go away!» campaign. Several hundred people participated in the protest, which resulted in running battles with riot police. The Russians leaders Alexander Belov, Dmitry Dyomushkin, George Borovikov and dozens of other nationalists were arrested. The head of the banned DPNI organization Vladimir Yermolaev was detained at a voting station where he was an observer. Also, mass detentions from other public organizations have occurred in Moscow. According to police some 258 persons have been detained.

On 5 December, up to 8,000 opponents of the government began protesting in Moscow, denouncing Vladimir Putin and his government and what they believed were flawed elections. Protesters argued that the elections had been a sham and demanded that Putin step down, whilst some demanded revolution.

On 6 December, 15,000 pro-United Russia activists marched near Red Square with 2,000 gathering in a different downtown location, while 5,000 people marched in protest at the same time. Truckloads of soldiers and police, as well as a water cannon, were deployed ahead of expected anti-government protests. 300 protesters had been arrested in Moscow the night before, along with 120 in St. Petersburg. During the night of 6 December, at least 600 protesters were reported to be in Triumphalnaya Square chanting slogans against Putin, Meanwhile, anti-government protesters at Revolution Square near the Kremlin clashed with riot police and interior ministry troops, with the police chasing around 100 away and arresting others. Protest numbers later reached over 1,000 at Triumphalnaya Square and dozens were arrested, including Boris Nemtsov, an opposition leader and former deputy prime minister, and Alexei Navalny, a top blogger and activist.

The government and United Russia were supported by massive meetings of the youth organizations, such as a 15,000-strong rally of Nashi and an 8,000 rally of the Young Guard on 6 December. On 12 December, the 18th anniversary of the Constitution of Russia, a meeting of pro-Kremlin groups supported Putin and United Russia and celebrated the Constitution.

== Analysis ==
=== Comparison with exit polls and forecasts ===
It is not possible to compare exit polls to the numbers reported by the election commission because no nationwide exit polls were conducted outside of the government. The only nationwide exit polls were conducted by the All-Russian Center for the Study of Public Opinion (VTsIOM) – the government-run polling organization controlled by the Labor Ministry. Therefore, there were no independent nationwide exit polls that took place during the elections.

However, United Russia's final result, 49.32%, not only coincided with the Central Election Commission's exit poll figure of 48.5%, but actually fell somewhat below the results of pre-election surveys by the Levada Center, the foremost non-governmental, independent polling and sociological research organization in Russia. Levada Center polls in September–November, listed above, found levels of support for United Russia between 51% and 60%.

The Election Commission reported that United Russia was also the leader in Moscow, with 46.5% of the vote. However, one early exit poll indicated that the share of United Russia was only 27%. The difference was attributed by some journalists to election fraud. The organization that provided the 27% figure subsequently withdrew its estimate, citing its low accuracy.

A large number of violations captured on observers' mobile phones suggest that the numbers provided by the election commission were fraudulent. In one report from Moscow, a Yabloko observer captured the pre-filled final tabulation in the regional election commission showing 515 (75.8%) votes for United Russia for his election station No. 6, while the records of the station No. 6 showed mere 128 (18.9%) votes for United Russia. This casts more doubts on the legitimacy of the figures of the exit polls and overall votes reported by the government.

=== Statistics ===
Critics call attention to the discrepancy of normally distributed votes cast for other parties and the sawtooth-shaped distribution of votes cast for United Russia (shown in blue)

Analysis by the physicist Sergey Shpilkin published by Gazeta.ru, Lenta.Ru, Troitsky Variant and with others in Esquire Russia reported on several characteristics of the election results which they view as evidence of fraud. Unlike elections in some other countries with a similar voting system, voter turnout does not display a normal distribution, and has distinct peaks appearing at multiples of 5%. Voter turnout exhibits a nearly linear relationship with the portion voting for United Russia, thus implying ballot stuffing in favor of UR. The distribution of percent voting for each party is not close to normal for United Russia either, unlike other parties. Similarly, percentages cast for United Russia have characteristic spikes at the round values of 50%, 60%, 70%, etc. Critics say, such a distribution might be a result of mass-scale fraud when local election commissions struggle to meet a certain objective, e.g. "60% for United Russia". Similar spikes also occurred in the 2007 Russian elections, and the political scientists Mikhail Myagkov, Peter Ordeshook and researcher Dmitri Shakin wrote that they are "consistent with the hypothesis that turnout numbers were manufactured artificially, with simple rounded numbers entered into official protocols." A team from Imperial College in London analysed the results and announced in May 2012 that they too suspected extensive fraud.

The Wall Street Journal, working with political scientists from the University of Michigan and the University of Chicago, published their own analysis of the election results, and pointed out a number of features which they believe indicate fraud. They estimate that as many as 14 million of the 65.7 million votes may be fraudulent.

An article published in Polit Online looked at criticisms of the analysis. The supposition of Gaussian distribution was criticized by sociologist Aleksey Grazhdankin, a deputy director of Levada Center (top independent non-governmental polling and sociological research organization in Russia). Grazhdankin cites regional differences and the existence of the so-called "electoral enclaves" in Russia, which vote very differently from the surrounding areas, often because the recent rise of the quality of life in such enclaves is associated with the actions of the authorities. Grazhdankin says he does not believe the graphs with non-Gaussian distributions indicate vote fraud. Still, in his comment to Vedomosti, Grazhdankin claimed that the most likely explanation to abnormal results observed in Moscow is fraud. Statistician Mikhail Simkin has also argued that the vote distribution should not be necessarily normal.

== See also ==
- 2011–2013 Russian protests
