= Corrective colony No. 2, Vladimir Oblast =

Prison in Pokrov, Russia

Coordinates: 55.90371°N 39.184472°E

FKU Corrective Colony No. 2 of the FSIN of Russia for Vladimir Oblast
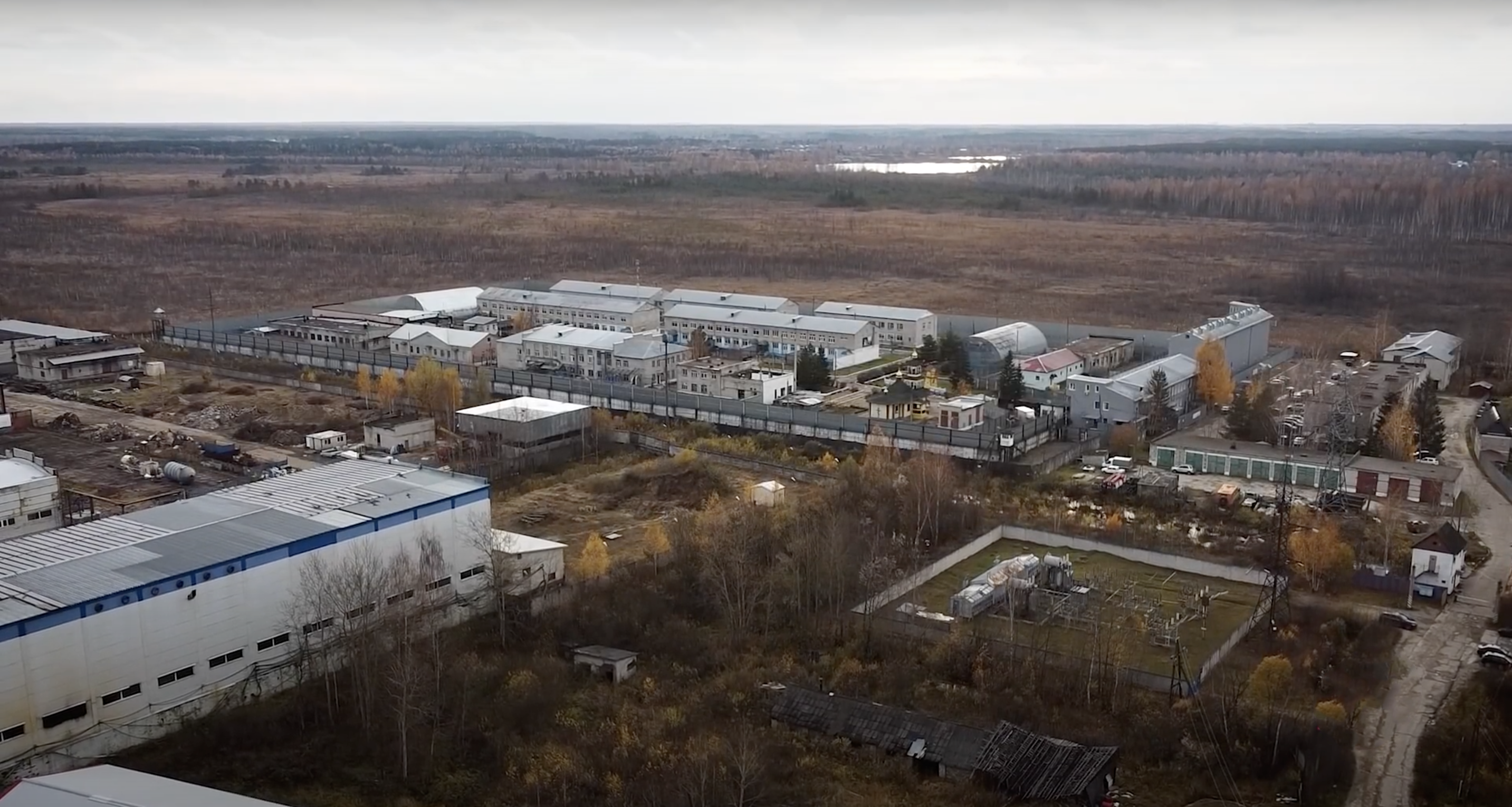
- Interactive map of FKU Corrective Colony No. 2 of the FSIN of Russia for Vladimir Oblast
- Location: Pokrov, Vladimir Oblast, Russia
- Status: Operational
- Security class: General regime colony
- Capacity: 794
- Opened: 1994
- Managed by: Federal Penitentiary Service
- Governor: Aleksandr Mukhanov

FKU (Note: 'FKU' stands for Federal Governmental Institution ("federalnoye kazyonnoye uchrezhdeniye") and UFSIN is for Office of the Federal Penitentiary Service ("Управление федеральной службы исполнения наказаний").) Corrective Colony No. 2 of the UFSIN of Russia for Vladimir Oblast (Russian: ФКУ Исправительная колония № 2 УФСИН России по Владимирской области, romanized: FKU Ispravitel'naya koloniya № 2 UFSIN Rossii po Vladimirskoy oblasti), also known simply as IK-2 Pokrov or Pokrov correctional colony, is a general regime corrective colony located on the outskirts of the town of Pokrov in Vladimir Oblast, Russia. It is known for its strict rules and harsh punishments.

== History ==
Earlier, on the site of the correctional colony, there was a medical and labor dispensary No. 2, created by order of the USSR Ministry of Internal Affairs in 1974. Correctional colony No. 2 was formed on its basis through reorganization in 1994 by order of the head of the Internal Affairs Directorate of the Vladimir Region Administration. The reorganization was carried out by the staff of the institution. The first prisoner entered the colony on 19 August 1996.

In 2005, the first online school in Russia for prisoners without a complete secondary education was opened in the Pokrov colony. Classes are compulsory for prisoners aged 18–30. For prisoners over 30 years of age, classes are optional. The school operates in a distance format on the basis of the Petushinskaya regional evening educational school.

Also in 2005, on the territory of IK-2 in Pokrov, on the initiative of the prisoners, a place was consecrated for the construction of a church in honor of the Holy New Martyrs and Confessors of Russia. Less than four years later, in 2008, the temple was built and consecrated by the Metropolitan of Vladimir Eulogius.

In 2007, a branch of the Federal State Professional Educational Institution No. 46 of the Federal Penitentiary Service was opened in the colony. Prisoners can receive a secondary vocational education in the specialties "woodworking machine operator", "metalworking machine operator" and "sewing equipment operator".

== Notable inmates ==
- Alexei Navalny – imprisoned between February 2021 and June 2022; he was then transferred to a strict regime colony in Melekhovo.
- Konstantin Kotov – imprisoned between 2019 and 2020.
- Dmitry Demushkin – imprisoned between 2016 and 2019.
- Alexei Gorinov – sentenced to seven years in prison for opposing the Russian invasion of Ukraine and imprisoned in 2022.

=== Alexei Navalny ===
In 2021, IK-2 in Pokrov became a subject in international media outlets after Alexei Navalny, founder of the Anti-Corruption Foundation was sentenced to serve three years and six months in a correctional colony – and sent to serve his time in IK-2 in Pokrov. Navalny had reported, through his lawyers, that he was denied medical help for the pain and numbness in his back and legs, as well as his seriously ill condition, with a fever reaching 38.1 °C and thus, started a hunger strike which lasted 24 days, ending on 23 April 2021, after Navalny was moved to a prison infirmary (specialising in treatment of tuberculosis) of penal colony IK-3, also in the Vladimir Region. Navalny's claims of alleged unlawful and inhumane treatment by IK-2 in Pokrov lead to a nation-wide protest on 21 April 2021, with protesters demanding Navalny be freed immediately and Russia's President Vladimir Putin be removed from power. Navalny was subsequently moved to the IK-6 Penal Colony that is infamous for its abuse and torture of inmates.

== See also ==
- FKU IK-3, Kharp
