= Northern Brotherhood =

Far-right movement in Russia

Northern Brotherhood Северное братство
- Abbreviation: SB (English); СБ (Russian)
- Leader: Pyotr Khomyakov
- Founders: Pyotr Khomyakov; Anton Mukhachev
- Founded: December 2006
- Banned: 6 August 2012
- Split from: Movement Against Illegal Immigration
- Preceded by: Freedom Party
- Ideology: Russian ultranationalism Revolutionary nationalism Ethnic nationalism Russian separatism Anti-immigration; Anti-caucasian; Antisemitism; Nordicism
- Political position: Far-right
- Religion: Slavic Neopaganism
- Colours: Maroon
- Slogan: "He who is not with us is against the Creator!" (Russian: "Кто не с нами, тот против Создателя!")

Website
- nordrus.org

The Northern Brotherhood (SB; Russian: Северное братство; СБ; Severnoye bratstvo, SB) was a Russian nationalist movement. The ideological basis of the movement is the books of the "Svarogov square" series," Technotronnaya Avesta", the "NORNA" program and a number of other materials of a nationalist nature.

The organization is not registered with the justice authorities. Northern Brotherhood declares non-recognition of the state power of Russia and refuses to comply with its instructions. However, the organization declares that it does not intend to directly violate the Criminal Code of the Russian Federation.

According to the statement of the Deputy Prosecutor General of Russia Viktor Grin, the General Prosecutor's Office classifies the Northern Brotherhood as one of the most active associations in Russia along with the organizations: National Socialist Society, Movement Against Illegal Immigration, Slavic Union, People's Will Army. On August 6, 2012, the Moscow City Court banned the interregional public association at the request of the prosecutor's office, recognizing it as extremist.

== Mukhachev case ==
On August 4, 2009, FSB officers in the city of Zheleznodorozhny (Moscow Oblast) detained entrepreneur Anton Mukhachev, who, according to information from Petr Khomyakov, reported by the latter to law enforcement agencies, is the leader of this organization. Together with Mukhachev, his wife, Olga Kasyanenko, who was also called a nationalist in the press, was detained, but she was released after interrogation due to the lack of any material on her, sufficient to initiate a criminal case. On August 11, the Lefortovo District Court of Moscow authorized the arrest of Mukhachev.

Anton Mukhachev is charged under Part 1 of Article 282 of the Criminal Code of the Russian Federation (organization of an extremist community, that is, the "Northern Brotherhood"). The investigation believes that the purpose of the organization was to overthrow the state system through revolution. In addition, Mukhachev is accused of creating an Internet project "Big Game", which, according to experts, contributes to inciting ethnic hatred.

The participants of the “Big Game” performed various tasks and reported to the organizers, for which they were awarded points. The tasks, as a rule, were actions mainly against immigrants from the CIS countries, whom the organizers called "aliens". In the "Game" there was, for example, the following task: "Send a movie fragment with a powerful firecracker to the alien kiosk, according to the script the door of the kiosk should be blocked".

Then Mukhachev was also accused of fraud. According to the investigators, he illegally embezzled 2 million 884 thousand rubles, having provided the accounting department of his trading house in the territory of the Noginsky district with an agreement on services that no one has ever provided to anyone.

According to the Russian Line agency, the Mukhachev case is a typical example of a "witch hunt". The Northern Brotherhood itself denies not only Mukhachev's involvement in the Security Council leadership, but also Mukhachev's membership in the Security Council in general.

One of the leaders of the Movement Against Illegal Immigration (DPNI), Alexander Belov (Potkin), called Mukhachev his former supporter, who in the hierarchy of the movement reached a candidate for membership in the central council and characterized him as follows: “a good businessman and an excellent propagandist of our views, but we parted methods - he accused me and the organization of insufficient radicalism ".

== History ==
In 2006, a professor in the field of the theory of systems analysis Pyotr Mikhailovich Khomyakov joined the organization.

The Northern Brotherhood finally took shape as an independent organization as a result of the DPNI split in December 2006.

Earlier, before the split of DPNI, SB was part of DPNI, its radical pagan wing.

In early 2009, PM Khomyakov was expelled from the Security Council due to a failed attempt to "merge" the organization.

In 2009, the Freedom Party joined the Northern Brotherhood as one of the participants in the Ruses Circles project; she had previously supported the Northern Brotherhood, participating in the Great Game, posting SB information materials on its websites; many people from the Freedom Party stood at the origins of the Northern Brotherhood.

== Objectives and core principles ==
The main goal of the Northern Brotherhood is to come to power in Russia amid the growing global crisis, which, according to the Security Council forecasts, will inevitably lead to the collapse and disintegration of the state in the coming years. After taking control of a significant part of the territory of the disintegrated state, it is planned to build a mono-ethnic, technocratic Russian national state under the code name "Svetlaya Rus" (Manifesto of the "Northern Brotherhood").

One of the features of the ideology of the Northern Brotherhood is "Russian separatism", expressed by the slogan "Russia against Russia". The ideologists of the movement advocate the separation from Russia of the North Caucasus and other subjects of the federation with a predominantly non-Russian population.

To approach the revolutionary situation in the Russian Federation, the SB intends to use its agents of influence in the power structures of the Russian Federation, disguised bribery of representatives of the authorities and separatist sentiments of regional elites, as well as the so-called “swinging the System” project “Big Game”.

== Structure ==
A network structure consisting of independent cells. Most members of the organization are anonymous and act as autonomous units.

== Membership ==
There is no exact data on the procedure for membership. From the statements of the SB it follows that "all Russians, Slavs, representatives of the peoples of Russia complimentary to us, representatives of any peoples of the white race who share our views" are accepted.

The Northern Brotherhood is sympathetic to the political and religious views of its supporters and associates. Acting officers, national socialists, skinheads, rodnovers, christians, atheists are accepted. The Security Council does not equate Christianity with the nomenclature of the Russian Orthodox Church. At the same time, the Security Council clarifies that "Christian supporters must understand that the ROC will almost certainly support the existing regime, which means that it will inevitably have to oppose the ROC." The organization does not accept supporters of the imperial-sovereign path of development of Russia.

=== Number of members ===
There is no exact data due to their autonomous structure. A certain number of members are located outside the Russian Federation, constituting the "Foreign Legion" of the SB.

== Foreign policy program ==
The Northern Brotherhood stands for non-interference in the affairs of neighboring countries, for mutually beneficial trade and cooperation, against expansion, for the construction of a Russian national state, respectful of neighboring peoples. This does not mean a refusal to fight for Russian national interests in the event of an aggressive encroachment on them. The principle of foreign policy proclaimed by the Security Council is "We won't take someone else's, we won't give up ours."

=== Attitude towards potential foreign sponsors ===
The Security Council treats financing issues pragmatically, without political sympathies and antipathies of a personal, national or racial nature. Only proposals from potential sponsors representing the interests of strategic opponents are not considered.

The opponents of the SB are:

1. Any countries and peoples pursuing a policy of ethno-demographic offensive against the Russian people on their land;
2. The Russian government, which, according to the Security Council, is implementing a policy of genocide against the Russian people and its replacement by the millions of foreign ethnic immigrants.
