= Melekhovo, Kirillovsky District, Vologda Oblast =

Melekhovo Мелехово
- Village
- Location within Vologda Oblast Location within Russia
- Coordinates: 59°51′N 38°35′E
- Country: Russia
- Region: Vologda Oblast
- District: Kirillovsky District
- Time zone: UTC+3:00

Melekhovo (Russian: Мелехово) is a rural locality (a village) in Nikolotorzhskoye Rural Settlement, Kirillovsky District, Vologda Oblast, Russia. The population was 5 as of 2002. It is close to the IK-6 Penal Colony where Russian opposition leader Alexei Navalny is imprisoned.

== Geography ==
Melekhovo is located 14 km east of Kirillov (the district's administrative centre) by road. Demidovo is the nearest rural locality.
