= Nation and Freedom Committee =

Russian nationalist socio-political association

Nation and Freedom Committee Комитет «Нация и свобода»
- Abbreviation: KNS (English); КНС (Russian)
- Leader: Vladimir Basmanov
- Founded: 21 September 2014
- Banned: 29 July 2020
- Preceded by: Movement Against Illegal Immigration
- Headquarters: 144th building, Varshavskoye Highway, Moscow, Russia
- Ideology: Russian ultranationalism Anti-communism; Anti-immigration; European nationalism Pan-Slavism
- Political position: Far-right
- Colours: Yellow; Black
- Slogan: "Russia will be Russian and free!" (Russian: "Россия будет русской и свободной!")

Party flag

Website
- komitetns.org

The Nation and Freedom Committee (KNS; Russian: Комитет «Нация и свобода»; КНС; Komitet «Natsiya i svoboda», KNS) is a Russian nationalist socio-political association whose purpose is to ensure the consolidated centralized participation of Russian nationalists in the general civil protest movement and to uphold the rights of the Russian population. KNU is the most active far-right protest organization in the Russian Federation, monthly featured in thematic reviews of human rights defenders who monitor the activities of ultra-right political movements in the Russian Federation. KNS is the core of the right wing of the Russian protest movement, in connection with which the organization's associates are regularly arrested during protests, pressure, less often - searches. The website, YouTube-channel, blog at livejournal.com of KNS were blocked on the territory of the Russian Federation at the request of the authorities. The blocking and removal of the channel on youtube was preceded by the removal of a video criticizing Putin's migration policy. KNS Facebook page was removed by the social network in connection with the propaganda of european nationalism, prohibited by the internal rules of the social network.

The Nation and Freedom Committee is one of the main organizers of the Russian March in Moscow (see links in the section "actions"), the main organizer of the Russian March in St. Petersburg and Novosibirsk, organizer of solidarity actions with the Russian March in a number of regions, the list of which is changing year to year. During its existence, the CND has held more than 10 protest campaigns, a number of conferences, organized or took part in hundreds of street protests, which follows from the organization's annual open reports, accompanied by photographs and videos. The organization has a restrained attitude to participation in elections, but from time to time it supports nationalist and right-liberal candidates in elections.

== History ==
The Nation and Freedom Committee was created by nationalists who participated or supported the March of Peace on September 21, 2014. Since then, the Nation and Freedom Committee has been participating in general civil protest campaigns by the Russian political opposition, and has also organized its own events and actions aimed at drawing attention to acute social and legal problems, the needs of political prisoners and important historical dates. The Nation and Freedom Committee actively supported the right-liberal political forces in the parliamentary elections, in particular, the PARNAS party, the Democratic Coalition, and other candidates close to national democratic convictions; opposes repressive laws, political repressions against oppositionists and for the abolition of Article 282 of the Criminal Code of the Russian Federation; actively interacts with right-liberal and democratic organizations; annually takes part in the "Russian March". In its program documents, campaign materials and articles, the KNS speaks from nationalist and sharply anti-communist positions. Vladimir Basmanov, Sofya Budnikova and some other Russian political emigrants took part in the creation of the KNS. The organization operated mainly on the territory of the Russian Federation. The first regional branch (league) of the organization was formed in Moscow, later, the media mentioned the activities of the organization's branches in many other cities.

On July 6, 2017, at the request of the Prosecutor General's Office of the Russian Federation, Roskomnadzor blocked the website of the Nation and Freedom Committee, as well as the nationalist portal Sputnik and Pogrom.

On July 29, 2020, the Krasnoyarsk Krai Court recognized the organization Nation and Freedom Committee as extremist and banned its activities on the territory of Russia. The organization plans to appeal the decision.

== Organization symbolics ==
Arms: the image of "Rurik's falcon" on a burgundy background, similar to the coat of arms of the city of Staraya Ladoga, which connects it with the motif of Old Russian statehood.

Flag: two-tone gold-black cloth, black standard with white or gold abbreviation "KNS". The black color symbolizes the Russian land, the nation, gold - the sunrise as the rebirth of the nation.

== Current leadership ==
The leader of the KNS is Vladimir Basmanov. He founded and headed the organization already being a political emigrant. On March 15, 2016, as the leader of the Nation and Freedom Committee, he applied to the International Criminal Court in The Hague with a demand to initiate the prosecution of Vladimir Putin. Basmanov accuses the Russian president of war crimes and crimes against humanity committed on the territory of Russia, Ukraine and Syria, organizing the persecution and murder of oppositionists and journalists, and building a dictatorial regime in the Russian Federation.

Budnikova Sofya Vladimirovna, born in 1986, General Secretary and emissary for general coordination in the KNS. In 2012, she was a member of the working group under the Russian Opposition Coordination Council; the founder of the "National News Service" (NSN) - the media dealing with the coverage of popular protests (now renamed the NSN "Russian Sector").

== Structure ==
The ruling body of the Committee is the Coordination Council, which consists of the leaders of the "action brigades", as well as special authorized emissaries who have only an advisory vote. Action Brigade is a working group formed to solve specific functional tasks such as campaigning, street actions, interregional communication, human rights protection, public relations or the development and launch of projects. Special authorized emissaries - appointed by the leader of the Committee to resolve certain issues and tasks, the powers of the emissary depend on the text of the appointment order. The KNS has territorial subdivisions - the so-called "local brigades", which enjoy wide autonomy. Several "local brigades", united territorially, form a "league".

== Goals and objectives ==
The Nation and Freedom Committee declares that it will seek:

1. The resignation of Putin and his government, the dissolution of the State Duma, the abolition of anti-popular laws, lustration and condemnation of persons involved in the crimes of the regime.

2. The formation of a government of popular confidence from political forces that have actively shown themselves in the fight against the dictatorship, to carry out legislative and constitutional reforms, as well as to bring the country out of the crisis.

3. Real ensuring the political rights of citizens - freedom of speech, assembly, and unions.

4. Simple registration of new political parties, creation of accessible conditions for their participation in elections at all levels.

5. Cancellation of 282, 280 articles of the Criminal Code and other anti-popular repressive elements of legislation. Dissolution or re-profiling of all anti-extremist structures of the political investigation of the FSB and the MVD.

6. Rehabilitation of those convicted under political offenses, amnesty for all prisoners in whose criminal cases there is a political or ideological component.

7. Complete rejection of the policy of replacement migration.

8. Maximum social support for russians, as the state-forming people of Russia, including through the cancellation of debts on all loans, including mortgages.

9. Complete de-Sovietization, condemnation of the crimes of the period of war communism and the Soviet government, recognition of the mass genocide of the Russian people, committed on class, religious and other grounds. Renaming of streets and dismantling of memorial structures in honor of the participants of the red terror. The prohibition of the CPRF and the United Russia.

10. Peaceful and good-neighborly relations with European countries, primarily Slavic. Condemnation of military aggression against Ukraine.

In other matters, the members of the Committee may adhere to directly opposite opinions and beliefs.

== KNS Actions and Campaigns ==
In its activities, the CND mainly affects the internal political problems of the country, but also goes to the international level in the framework of interaction with like-minded people from other countries.

== Repressions against associates of the organization ==
The loudest episode of the persecution of the KNS comrades-in-arms was the searches in October 2018 of the youth leader from the Moscow Organization of the KNS Georgy Chumachenko, known in right-wing circles as Georgy Krasnov, and two more young supporters of the organization, after which the young men were forced to leave the KNS in connection with the pressure exerted by the security forces.

In 2016, Igor Stenin was sentenced to two years in prison in a penal colony for disseminating calls to extremism (part 2 of Art.280 of the Criminal Code of the Russian Federation). The nationalist was brought to criminal responsibility for the fact that in 2014 he “re-posted” an article that was recognized as extremist, commenting on it with a phrase in support of Ukraine with a call to destroy the “Kremlin occupants”. In February 2019, Igor Stenin left the Russian Federation for fear of further political persecution. Igor Stenin, for a little over a year held the position of responsible for human rights in the KNS.

In the fall of 2016, the ex-head of the Moscow Organization of the KNS was conditionally sentenced for publishing music on Vkontakte, despite the fact that the post was made 5 years ago, when Vladimir was still in school. Later, the verdict was appealed and commuted to correctional labor. Ratnikov headed the KNS of Moscow until the spring of 2018, the last action of the KNS under the leadership of Ratnikov was a column of nationalists on the march against political terror in 2018, then he devoted himself entirely to another political project, Black Bloc. In this capacity, he was arrested in the summer of 2018, in connection with charges under political articles of the Criminal Code, the Memorial Human Rights Center announced probable political motives in the persecution of Ratnikov. The Black Bloc case is still in court.

On January 21, 2016, searches were carried out in the houses of the parents and brother of the head of the KNS Vladimir Basmanov, the formal reason for the searches is presumably the unwanted publications of Vladimir Basmanov on the Internet.

== Criticism ==
In the spring of 2018, Novaya Gazeta accused the Nation and Freedom Committee of preparing mass riots, in connection with a statement of its readiness to "support protest actions and other political forces in connection with the falsification of elections, if such will be announced by our allies."

Life also announced that the KNS associates, together with their political allies, were preparing the Maidan in Moscow on May 5, 2018. On this day, during a general civil protest for the resignation of Putin, several comrades-in-arms of the KNS and allied organizations of the KNS organizations were detained.

In February 2019, the Federal News Agency accused the KNU of the fact that, due to too close cooperation of nationalists and liberals, the ultra-left feels redundant in political protests and is forced to create terrorist groups.

In spring 2020, the International Bureau of Human Rights called the anti-immigration campaign of the KNS aggressive.
