= Potkin =

Potkin is a surname of Russian origin. Notable people with the surname include:

- Alexander Potkin (born 1976), Russian far-right political leader
- Vladimir Potkin (born 1982), Russian chess grandmaster
