= Dmitry Demushkin =

Russian politician (born 1979)

- Дмитрий Дёмушкин
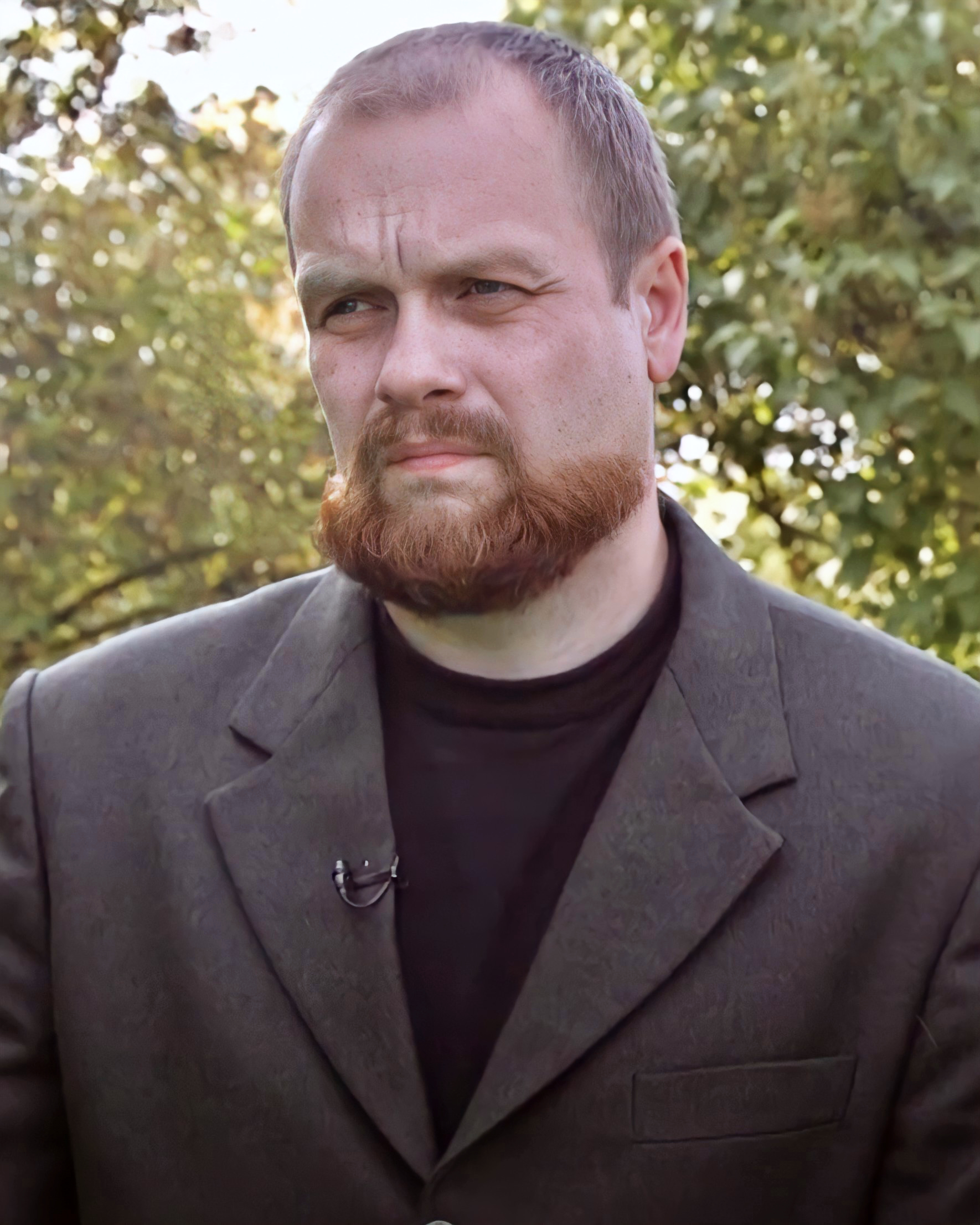
- Demushkin in 2019

Personal details
- Born: Dmitry Nikolayevich Demushkin; 7 May 1979 (age 47) Moscow, Russian SFSR, Soviet Union
- Party: Slavic Union (1999–2010); Russians (2011–2015)

Dmitry Nikolayevich Demushkin (Note: Also transliterated as Dyomushkin.) (Russian: Дмитрий Николаевич Дёмушкин; born 7 May 1979) is a Russian nationalist activist, politician and public figure. He founded the neo-Nazi organization "Slavic Union" in 1999, which was designated as extremist and banned in 2010. In 2011, he co-founded the nationalist organization "Russians", which was designated as extremist and banned in 2015. He was also an organizer of the Russian march. In 2019, Demushkin was appointed interim head of the administration of the rural settlement Barvikhinskoye, Odintsovsky District, Moscow Oblast.

== Early life ==
Dmitry Nikolayevich Demushkin was born in the city of Moscow on 7 May 1979. His father Nikolai Mikhailovich Demushkin is an ambulance driver and driving instructor. His mother Yelena Aleksandrovna Demushkina (née Petrova) is a teacher of Russian language and literature. In 1981, his parents divorced, and Dmitry was raised by his mother, grandmother and aunt.

In his youth, Dmitry boxed frequently and visited the gym often. "We had our own group, we didn't call ourselves skinheads then, but we all looked similar. Everyone shaved their heads and wore leather jackets, ready for a fight," Demushkin recalled. In early 1995, Demushkin joined a group of people "who considered themselves to be skinheads."

== Education ==
He attended three school in Moscow: No. 763 until fifth grade, then at No. 997 up to ninth grade, and finally completed high school at No. 144.

He graduated from the Moscow Social and Humanitarian Institute with a degree in "State and Municipal Administration" from the Faculty of Economics and from the Faculty of Psychology with a degree in teaching psychology. In September 2008, he entered graduate school.

== Political career ==
=== 1990s ===
In 1995, he was one of the founders of the first group of skinheads on the Arbat. On April 6, 1996, he joined Russian National Unity (RNU).

In 1999, he began to "manage the quarantine" of RNU. “At the beginning, Barkashov was against me managing the quarantine because of my speech impediment, but I had a talent for persuading people,” Demushkin said. At the same time, according to his own recollections, he began, together with his deputies, to "secretly" supervise the "functions of the Security Council" (security services) of RNU.

After a split in RNU, Demushkin founded the far-right organization "Slavic Union" in 1999. The main goals of the organization are to establish Russian as a national power, increase the national representation of Russians and consolidate Russia's status as a state-forming nation. In 2010, the organization was banned by authorities on grounds of extremism.

=== 2000s ===
In 2001, he created the organizing committee of the National Power Party of Russia (NDPR). He also signed a Memorandum of Establishment with Yuri Belyaev (Freedom Party) and Stanislav Terekhov (Union of Officers).

In January 2006, Demushkin assigned lawyers to defend Alexander Koptsev, who attacked one of Moscow's synagogues. At the same time, Demushkin claimed that Koptsev's belonging to the Slavic Union had not been established.

In July 2006, Demushkin was detained by law enforcement agencies in connection with his suspected involvement in an explosion near a mosque in Yakhroma. A search was carried out in Demushkin's apartment, where a laptop and six boxes of various materials were seized and Demushkin was arrested. He was released shortly after. Subsequently, Oleg Kostarev and Ilya Tikhomirov, who were also responsible for the 2006 Moscow market bombing, took responsibility for the attack in Yakhroma.

=== 2010s ===
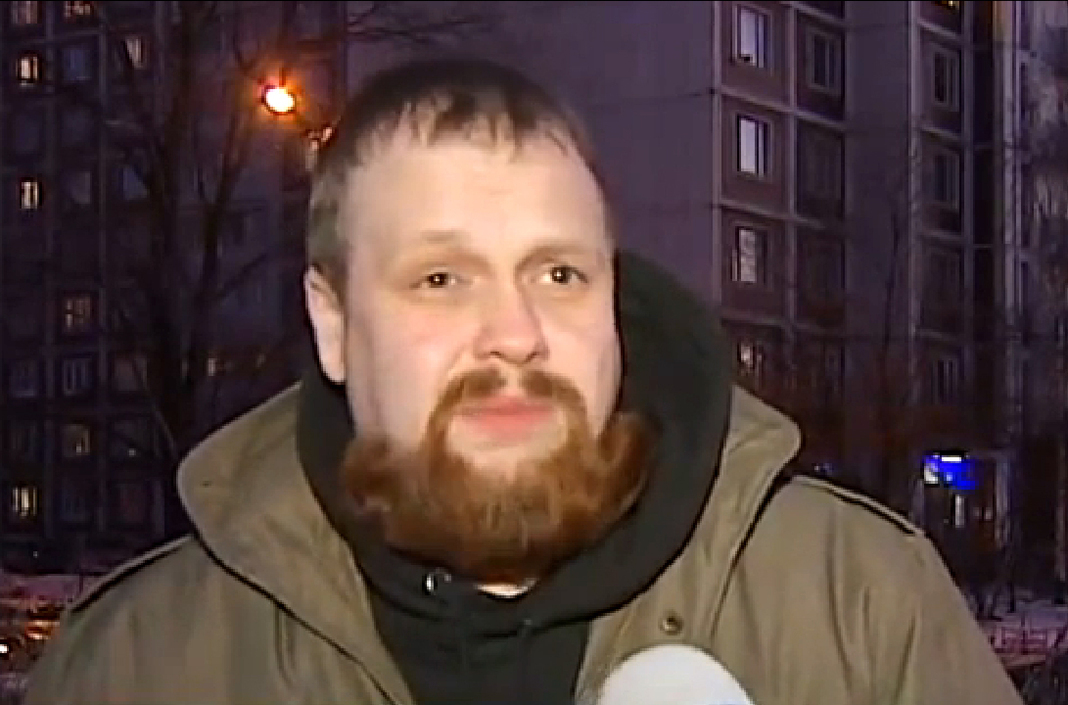
Dmitry Demushkin in 2015.

On April 27, 2010, the Moscow City Court classified the "Slavic Union" movement as extremist. On June 29, 2010, the Supreme Court of Russia upheld the decision of the Moscow City Court to ban the movement. On the same day, Demushkin announced the dissolution of the organization. The successor of the banned movement was called the "Slavic Force."

"Slavic Force" positioned itself as a Nazi organization, recognizing the work of the leaders of the NSDAP as its basis. The organization openly demanded the "cleansing" of the country from all "non-Russians", with the only exception being representatives of ethnic groups that did not have statehood. For these purposes, the organization supported and encouraged right-wing radical violence.

On December 11, 2010, Demushkin took part in the Riots on Manezhnaya Square (2010), but categorically denied accusations that nationalists provoked clashes with riot police.

On March 12, 2011, he spoke at a rally in Moscow in defense of Colonel Kvachkov, who was accused of attempting to orchestrate a rebellion.

In 2011, Demushkin co-founded the nationalist organization "Russians", however it was banned in 2015.

On May 3, 2011, Demushkin co-founded the nationalist organization "Russians" with DPNI leader Alexander Belov, however it was banned in 2015. The new organization was created on the basis of the banned Slavic Union and DPNI, as well as a number of other nationalist movements. In July 2011, Demushkin, together with two associates (Alexander Belov and Vladimir Maksimov) went to Chechnya, after which he admired the state of affairs in the republic, which caused a mixed reaction among Russian nationalists.

On January 29, 2012, Demushkin spoke in the parliament of the Chechen Republic, where he raised the issue of giving the Russian people a state-forming status in the Russian Federation. This proposal involves the introduction of appropriate amendments to Article 1 of the Constitution of Russia. Earlier, the head of the Chechen parliament, Dukuvakha Abdurakhmanov, commented on Demushkin's initiative, saying in an interview with the Russian News Service that the body was ready to come up with a legislative initiative to change the status of the Russian people. At the same time, he stressed that legally this "will not give anyone anything." Abdurakhmanov also said “but if there is such a desire, and this desire is constantly exploited politically, it is possible to place emphasis (on the issue).”

He took an active part in the defense of the leader of the "Moscow Defense League" Daniil Konstantinov, who was detained on suspicion of murder. In an interview with RIA Novy Region, Demushkin said that he did not exclude the possibility that the prosecution of Konstantinov could have been fabricated for political reasons. Demushkin also added that prior to his arrest, law enforcement officers put pressure on Konstantinov in order to persuade him to cooperate. On April 9, 2012, Demushkin participated in a series of solo pickets near the building of the Main Investigation Department of the Investigative Committee.

On April 26, 2012, in an interview with RIA Novy Region, Demushkin expressed the opinion that a criminal case would be initiated against lawyer Dagir Khasavov, who on the air with Ren-TV promised to flood Moscow with blood if Sharia courts were not created. At the same time, he noted that after Khasavov's statement, xenophobia in Russia would increase, which could lead to unpredictable consequences. According to Demushkin, Khasavov "did more to incite ethnic hatred in Russia than all nationalists - both Russians and the rest, combined."

On August 14, 2012, Demushkin submitted documents to run for mayor of Kaliningrad, however, the Election Commission refused to register him.

On August 22, 2012, he turned to the Patriarch of Moscow and All Rus' Kirill with a request to support the committee "For the Removal of Lenin." Earlier, Demushkin turned to the Prosecutor General of Russia Yury Chaika with a request to check whether the presence of Lenin's body on Red Square was legal. To date, no official response has been received from the Prosecutor General's Office.

On March 19, 2012, Russians expressed its intention to create a political party, with Demushkin as the leader.

In early July 2012, Demushkin notified the Ministry of Justice of the creation of a Party of Nationalists. Demushkin was appointed authorized person of the committee. To date, the party registration process has not been completed.

He took an active part in the 2011–2013 Russian protests that unfolded after the Duma elections in 2011.

In 2013, Demushkin announced his intention to run for president in the 2018 Russian presidential election. He was unsuccessful.

In 2015, Demushkin was featured in Reggie Yates' Extreme Russia documentary.

In 2019, he became a correspondent for the "White News" online publication.

== Political beliefs ==
During his membership in the Slavic Union, Demushkin had Nazi views. However, in a 2015 interview with the online publication Meduza, Demushkin said that National Socialism is a “dead end path”, and today he considers himself a “traditional nationalist.”

Demushkin has argued that the Russian people be given state-forming status and that appropriate amendments be made to the Russian Constitution.

At the same time, he calls the slogan Russia for Russians “not very correct and requires deciphering.” In his opinion, the slogan should be interpreted as "Russia for the Russians and other indigenous peoples of Russia." Indigenous peoples refers to peoples who "live on the territory of the country, participate in its defense, construction and strengthening and do not have their own national formations outside Russia."

He believes that Russians, Ukrainians and Belarusians are one people.

He advocates for the introduction of a visa regime with the countries of Central Asia, to restore order in the migration sphere and the labor market, and to eliminate ethnic monopolies for ethnic communities.

He is a supporter of the de-Sovietization of Russia. He is the coordinator of the committee "For the Removal of Lenin's Mummy!"

Demushkin is one of the key organizers of the Russian march.

In an interview with the Nevex TV news agency, he promised to completely change Russian television if he came to power, as it contributes to the moral degradation of young people. In particular, Demushkin said that MTV would definitely be closed under him, since, in his opinion, it was engaged in the promotion of homosexuality.

On May 5, 2012, in an interview with the Russian news agency Novy Region, Demushkin stated that “today there is not a single organization and party that would reflect the interests of Russians. We have communists, liberals, bureaucrats, "the party of crooks and thieves". But there is no Russian party. We are striving for universal ethno-political Russian solidarity.”

He did not publicly express his position on the beginning of Russo-Ukrainian war in 2014, but he considered the actions of the Russian authorities erroneous, since they actually only strengthened anti-Russian sentiments in Ukraine.

In 2022, Demushkin condemned Russia's invasion of Ukraine and demanded an end to it. In November 2022, two protocols were drawn up against Demushkin for spreading fake news about the Russian military. Shortly before that, his apartment was searched, and his phone was confiscated. Demushkin's lawyer linked the persecution with the Demushkin's journalistic activities.

== Criminal cases ==
=== Slavic Union ===
On May 3, 2011, the Main Investigation Department of the Investigative Committee initiated a criminal case under Part 1 of Art. 282.2 of the Criminal Code of the Russian Federation (organization of the activities of an extremist organization). According to the investigators, “the activities of the Slavic Union public association, despite being duly recognized as an extremist organization, have not actually been stopped. On the contrary, in order to avoid criminal liability, the association was renamed and became known as "Slavic Force". The actual leader of this organization is Dmitry Demushkin."

On October 22, 2011, a criminal case was initiated against Demushkin under two articles of the Criminal Code of the Russian Federation: inciting hatred or enmity and calling for riots and violence against citizens. According to the investigation, in an interview on October 17, 2011, Demushkin expressed ideas about recognizing the superiority of the Russian nation over others, called for riots and expressed threats of violence against persons who would prevent the establishment of the ideology of Russian superiority.

Some of the charges were dropped, so Demushkin was only charged with engaging with an extremist group that had been banned, under which he faced up to three years in prison. On June 24, 2013, the trial began in the Ostankinsky Court of Moscow.

In March 2014, the world court of the Ostankino district of Moscow found Demushkin guilty of organizing an extremist community, referring to the Slavic Force movement, which he was the leader of. Demushkin was sentenced to a fine of 200,000 rubles, but was released from punishment due to the expiration of the statute of limitations for the crime.

During the 2011–2013 Russian protests, Demushkin was wounded while in police detention and was taken to the Danilovsky police department. According to him, law enforcement officers hit him on the head with a rubber club.

In 2016, Demushkin was sentenced to two and a half years in prison for inciting hatred under Article 282 of the Criminal Code of Russia, an extremism statute. The basis of the criminal case were pictures published on his page in the social network VK. Demushkin spent eight months in the intensive monitoring sector, because in the materials from the investigator he was marked as prone to escape. He was released in 2019 after serving his prison sentence at a prison in Pokrov, Vladimir Oblast.

=== Extremism ===
On March 28, 2016, Demushkin was included in the register of extremists and terrorists of Rosfinmonitoring.

On October 21, 2016, while applying for a permit for the Russian march, Demushkin was detained and placed on house arrest for engaging in extremism. The criminal case was initiated because of pictures that were published on his page on VK. On April 25, 2017, the Nagatinskiy District Court of Moscow sentenced him to 2.5 years in prison. He spent 8 months in IK-2, as he was marked as prone to escape.

On February 20, 2019, the Petushinsky District Court of the Vladimir Region ruled that Demushkin would receive an early release from corrective colony No. 2 in Pokrov. The basis for early release was the partial decriminalization of Part 1 of Article 282 of the Criminal Code of Russia, which concerned extremist activity. Because of his early release, Demushkin was released 15 days earlier than his full sentence.

On December 20, 2019, Demushkin was removed from the register of Rosfinmonitoring.

== Municipal Employee Career ==
Soon after his release from prison, Demushkin was hired as a specialist in local governments in the rural settlement of Barvikhinsky. He was then appointed to the position of Chief Specialist of the Department for Organizational Work, Youth Affairs, Culture and Sports in Barvikhinsky. On May 13, 2019, Demushkin was appointed acting head of the administration of the rural settlement of Barvikhinsky. In his new position, Demushkin checked the activities of the previous administration and fought against the unification of Barvikha with the Odintsovo District. After the unification of the Odintsovo District, the powers of local governments and local government officials have been terminated.
