= Slavic Union (Russia) =

Russian neo-Nazi organization

Slavic Union Славянский союз
- The group's insignia, a stylized Tursaansydän made to represent two S's.
- Abbreviation: SU (English); СС (Russian); SS (Romanized)
- Founder: Dmitry Demushkin
- Founded: September 1999
- Banned: June 29, 2010
- Split from: Russian National Unity
- Succeeded by: Russians
- Ideology: Neo-Nazism; Pan-Slavism; Russian ultranationalism
- Political position: Far-right
- Religion: Slavic paganism
- Colours: Red White
- Slogan: "Russia for Russians"

Party flag

National Socialist Movement "Slavic Union" (Russian: Национал-социалистическое движение «Славянский союз», romanized: Natsional-sotsialisticheskoye dvizheniye «Slavyanskiy soyuz») was a Russian neo-Nazi organization founded in 1999 by Dmitry Demushkin. In 2010, it was banned by the Moscow City Court. The group's website, in Russian, links to extensive material on Holocaust denial and to works by Adolf Hitler. Its organizational logo was a stylized swastika and the group's initials, "SS" in Russian, are the same as those used by the German Schutzstaffel during World War II. The party was also notorious for promoting a far-right, "Aryan" tradition of Slavic paganism. The organisation was described as ultranationalist and anti-Semitic.

== History ==
Slavic Union was founded in September 1999 by Dmitry Demushkin. In Autumn 2000, there was a conflict in the leadership of Russian National Unity, as a result of which on 21 September 2000, at a closed plenum of commanders of sixteen regional branches, it was announced that Alexander Barkashov, the founder and leader of the movement, had been expelled from the ranks of Russian National Unity. In October of the same year, O. Kassin's moderate patriotic movement Russian Revival was established on the basis of the Moscow and Stavropol branches of Russian National Unity. Dmitry Demushkin also split from Russian National Unity, founding his own movement Slavic Union.

Europe-Asia Studies called the Slavic Union the best known Russian neo-Nazi organisation, although it stressed that it had very few members. Along with Russian All-National Union, it was the only far-right organisation in Russia to have had permanent bases used for training camps. Main activities of the party involved paramilitary training and low-scale racist attacks. Officially, the party claimed to not have endorsed violent activities, although individual members of the organisation were tried for violent acts up to the party's ban in June 2010. In 2006, Demushkin was arrested on suspicion of involvement in a mosque attack in the town of Yakhroma. In September 2008, another leader of the Slavic Union was arrested for murder of a Tajik and a Dagestani.

The Prosecutor General's Office of the Russian Federation listed the Slavic Union as one of the "most active extremist associations" in Russia in 2009, along with organisations such as: "National Socialist Society", "Movement Against Illegal Immigration", "Northern Brotherhood." The Slavic Union was sympathetic to German National Socialism, although it did not advertise this.

Slavic Union was banned by the Moscow City Court on 27 April 2010 following charges by prosecutors that the group promotes national socialism with "ideas similar to the ideology of Nazi Germany". Responding to the ban on 27 April, Demushkin noted that the Slavic Union had been "banned all across Russia" and indicated that an appeal to higher legal authority of the organization's prohibition would "definitely" be forthcoming. Since then, the group has remained active underground.

In September 2010 information surfaced that the organization allegedly has opened offices in Norway. This was reported when Viacheslav Datsik showed up at Norwegian immigration authorities requesting political asylum. Datsik had shortly before escaped from a mental institution near Saint Petersburg and was believed to have reached Norway on board an arms-trafficking vessel. Together with two other persons he was arrested by Norwegian police on suspicion of having possible links to organized crime. In 2012, it was reported that an underground successor to the Slavic Union called the Slavic Force (Slavyanskaya Sila) was formed.

== Ideology ==
Slavic Union was described as neo-Nazi, pan-Slavic, white supremacist, nativist, anti-immigration, anti-communist, anti-Semitic and homophobic. When the organisation was created in 1999, Russia had a very high immigration rate, which was reflected in the xenophobic rhetoric of the Slavic Union. The organisation blamed refugees and foreign migrant workers, as well as minorities such as the Jews and the LGBT community, for the supposed decline of Russia as well as the "Slavic world" itself.

At its core, the organisation is pan-Slavic and promotes the concept of unifying all Slavic nations. Zeev Sternhell classified the organisation's rooted as anti-Enlightenment, perceiving "democracy and pleas for equality…[as] an attack on the natural order". In promoting pan-Slavism, the organisation made appeals to "blood purity" and "the greatness and the power of the Slavic race", while also promoting military strength that a union of all Slavic countries would supposedly possess. Slavic Union made references to historical states that encompassed much of the Slavic world such as Kievan Rus and the Soviet Union; the organisation even repurposed Soviet propaganda posters, replacing the communist hammer and sickle with paganist tribal signs.

In order to complement its pan-Slavic rhetoric, the organisation also promoted Slavic paganism and often references Slavic legends and methodology as to create the image of a powerful, pre-Christian "Slavic race". The symbols of German National Socialists were connected and combined with Slavic ones, resulting in reversed swastikas and Slavic runes, including rune-styled Slavic words.
