= Melekhovo, Vladimir Oblast =

Urban locality in Vladimir Oblast, Russia

Coordinates: 56°16′20″N 41°18′00″E

Melekhovo (Russian: Мелехово) is an urban-type settlement in Kovrovsky District of Vladimir Oblast, Russia. Population: 6,560 (2021 census); 7,039 (2010 census); 7,084 (2002 census); 6,180 (1989 Soviet census). It is home to the IK-6 maximum security prison.
