= Russians (organization) =

Russian political party

Ethno-political association "Russians" Этнополитическое объединение «Русские»
- Leader: Dmitry Demushkin
- Founders: Dmitry Demushkin; Alexander Belov
- Founded: 3 May 2011
- Banned: 28 October 2015
- Preceded by: Slavic Union; Movement Against Illegal Immigration
- Ideology: Russian nationalism Ethnic nationalism Anti-immigration
- Political position: Far-right
- Colours: Black; Gold; White; Red

Party flag

Website
- rusnat.com

Ethnopolitical Association "Russians" (Russian: Этнополитическое объединение «Русские», romanized: Etnopoliticheskoye obyedineniye "Russkiye"), or simply Russians (Русские), was a Russian nationalist organization founded in 2011 by Dmitry Demushkin and Alexander Potkin (Belov). It was outlawed on 28 October 2015 by a Moscow court after being designated as an extremist group.
