= Corrective colony No. 6, Vladimir Oblast =

Prison in Melekhovo, Russia

FKU Corrective Colony No. 6 of the FSIN of Russia for Vladimir Oblast
- Interactive map of FKU Corrective Colony No. 6 of the FSIN of Russia for Vladimir Oblast
- Location: Melekhovo, Vladimir Oblast, Russia; 56°15′19″N 41°18′59″E
- Status: Operational
- Managed by: Federal Penitentiary Service

FKU (Note: 'FKU' stands for Federal Governmental Institution ("federalnoye kazyonnoye uchrezhdeniye") and UFSIN is for Office of the Federal Penitentiary Service ("Управление федеральной службы исполнения наказаний").) Corrective Colony No. 6 of the UFSIN of Russia for Vladimir Oblast also known simply as IK-6 Melekhovo or Melekhovo correctional colony, is a strict regime corrective colony located on the outskirts of the town of Melekhovo in Vladimir Oblast, Russia. Abuse and torture of inmates have been reported.

Russian opposition leader and prisoner of conscience Alexei Navalny was imprisoned there from 2022 until late 2023.

It is also the last known location of Russian political activist and prisoner Vladimir Kara-Murza.

Dissident journalist Vladimir Kara-Murza was later transferred elsewhere and then, in August 2024, released from detention.
