= Russian All-National Union =

Russian All-National Union Русский общенациональный союз
- Abbreviation: RONS (English); РОНС (Russian)
- Leader: Igor Artemov
- Founded: 1 December 1990; 35 years ago
- Banned: 6 June 2011; 15 years ago
- Headquarters: 14th building, Lazo Street, Moscow, Russia. 111395
- Newspaper: Third Rome
- Ideology: Russian ultranationalism Orthodox nationalism Anti-communism; Anti-Sovietism; Anti-LGBT; Pan-Slavism
- Political position: Far-right
- Religion: Russian Orthodox Church
- Colours: Black; Gold; White
- Slogan: "Russia will be liberated by our forces!" (Russian: "Россия освободится нашими силами!")

Party flag

Website
- ronsslav.com

The Russian All-National Union (RONS; Russian: Русский общенациональный союз; РОНС; Russkiy obshchenatsionalnyy soyuz, RONS) was a Russian Pan-Slavic Orthodox political movement which was founded in 1990. From 1995, RONS took part in state and local elections and its representatives became the members of local parliaments in the Irkutsk, Novosibirsk, Vladimir, and Tula Oblasts. Members of the organization represented RONS in municipal legislatures in more than twelve regions of Russia, including in: Saint Petersburg, Nizhny Novgorod, Stavropol, and Rostov-on-Don.

RONS was known to organize against the policies of the Yeltsin, Putin, and Medvedev governments, often citing resistance to the "propaganda of alcohol, smoking, abortion and homosexuality", as well as against various "immoral" programs on television and radio. It also sponsored youth sporting camps in summer periods.

RONS published the newspapers "Рубеж", "Отчизна", along with a magazine named "Третий Рим", the symbols of these papers included the Celtic cross, Saint George the Victorious, and along with various Russian national banners: primarily the modern national flag of the Russian Federation and the black-yellow-white tricolor.

The National Council of RONS included 15 members, and the chairman was Igor V. Artemov (Игорь Артёмов).
