= Alexander Potkin =

Russian politician

- Александр Поткин
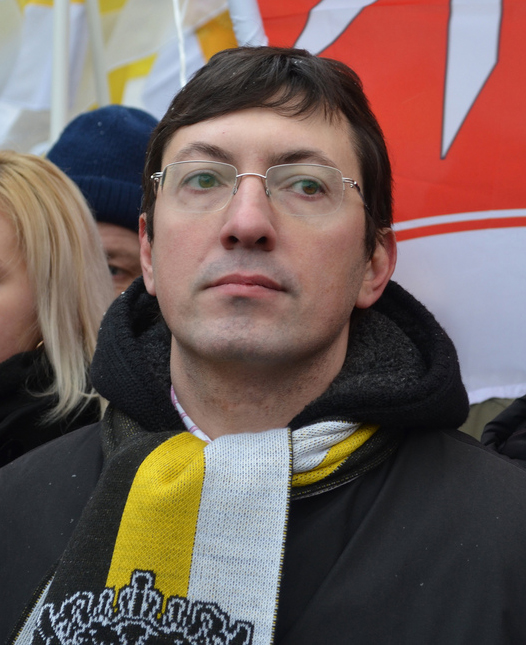
- Potkin in 2012

Personal details
- Born: Alexander Anatolyevich Potkin; 29 May 1976 (age 50) Moscow, Russian SFSR, Soviet Union
- Party: DPNI (2002–2011); Russians (2011–2015)
- Education: Peoples' Friendship University; Russian State University for the Humanities

Alexander Anatolyevich Potkin (Russian: Александр Анатольевич Поткин; born 29 April 1976), also known as Alexander Belov, is a Russian nationalist politician.

== Political career ==
Potkin led the Movement Against Illegal Immigration, a nationalist organization, which was later banned in April 2011. The following month, he co-founded the nationalist organization "Russians" with Dmitry Demushkin, which was later banned in 2015.

== Criminal cases ==
In May 2009, he was found guilty by a Moscow Court of inciting ethnic hatred after comparing the Russian White House to a Torah Scroll.

In August 2016, he was sentenced to prison on charges of creating an extremist group and money laundering. He was sentenced to seven and a half years in prison.
