= Russian march =

Annual demonstration

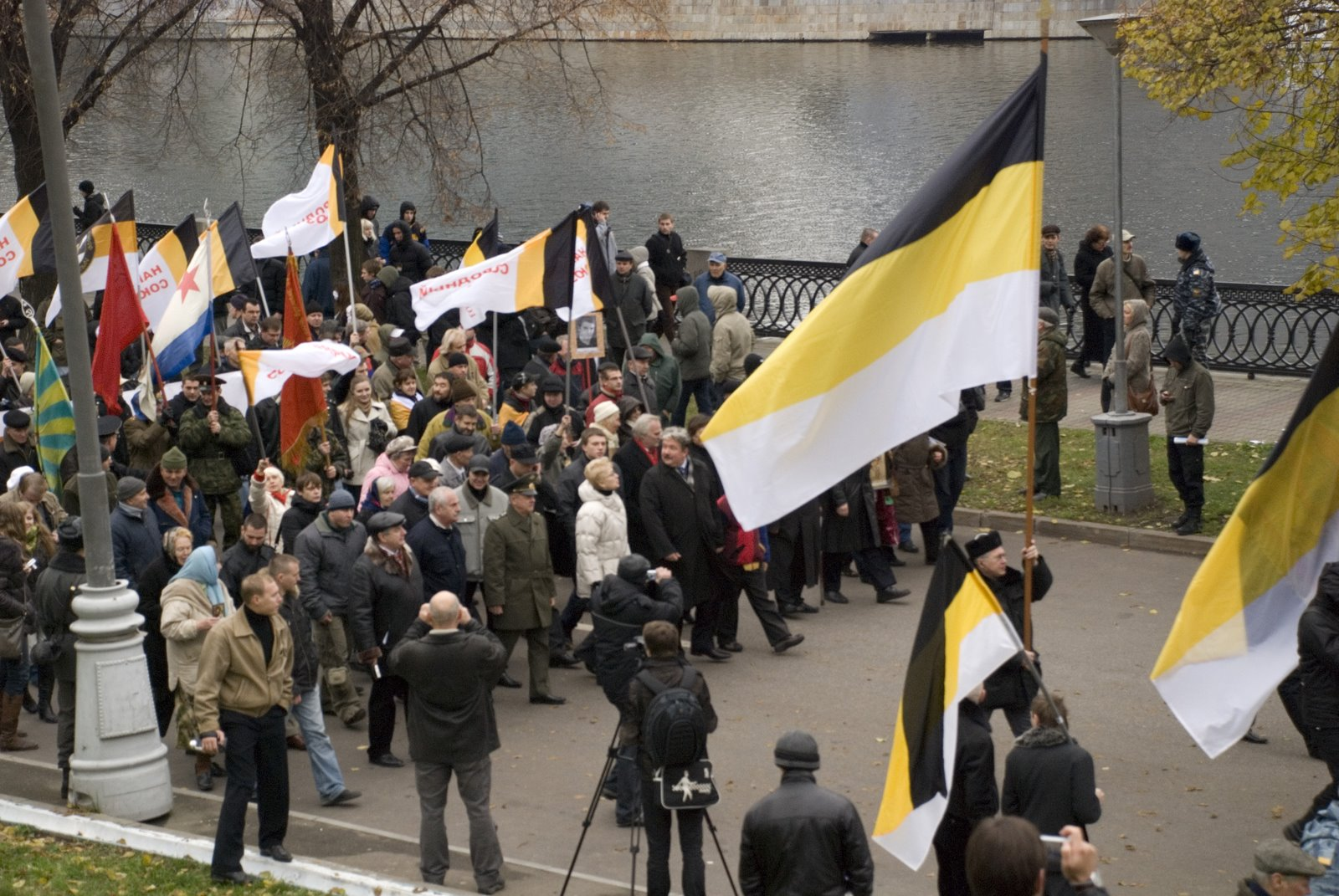
Russian nationalists, carrying the black-yellow-white monarchist flag, in 2008 march.

The Russian march (Russian: Русский марш, romanized: Russkiy marsh) is an annual demonstration conducted by far-right Russian nationalist and neo-Nazi organizations in major Russian cities. They are usually conducted on 4 November, the Day of National Unity in Russia.

== First Russian march ==
The first Russian March took place on 4 November 2005, the Unity Day.

== 2006 Russian march ==
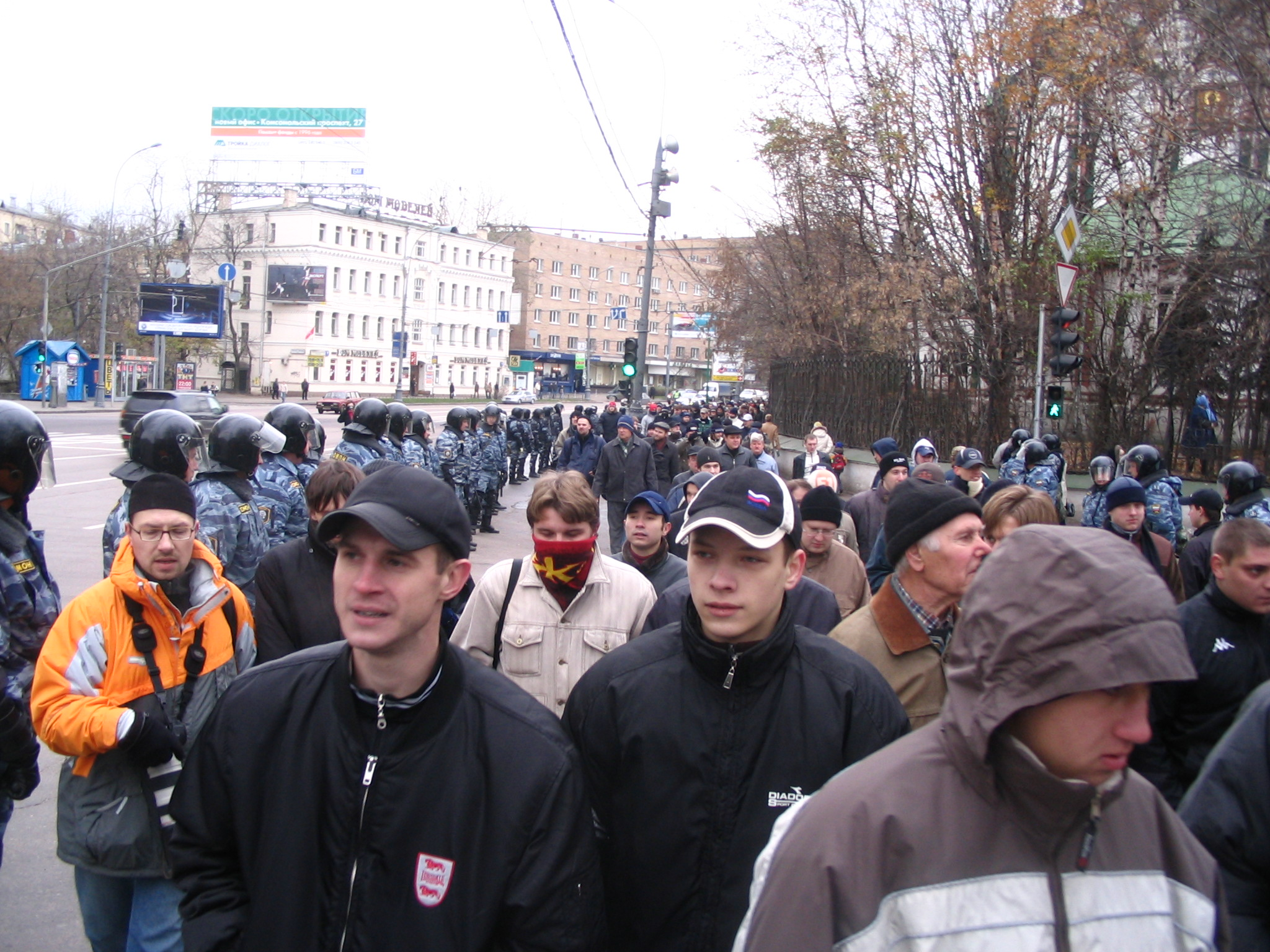
Demonstrators of the 2006 Russian march walked for several hundred metres within a corridor lined by riot police

Besides Moscow, the March was planned in Saint Petersburg, Krasnoyarsk, Novosibirsk, Chita, Stavropol, Maykop, Tyumen, Vladivostok, Yuzhno-Sakhalinsk, Blagoveshchensk, Nizhniy Novgorod and Kaliningrad, but was banned in the majority of cities as well. Irkutsk officially allowed the March. The rallies took place also in Ukraine (Kyiv, Crimea, Odesa, Sevastopol), Moldova (Chișinău, Tiraspol) and Georgia (Tbilisi). The Heads of Russian Youth of Moldova and Eurasian Youth Union of the Republic of Moldova have been arrested. Even though the use of Nazi symbols was prohibited by the organizers, a flag with conventionalized swastika was raised by the Head of SS-Slavic Union Dmitriy Demushkin in Moscow.

Banning the march in Moscow, mayor Yuriy Luzhkov said: "If we allow our state to be split on ethnic or interconfessional grounds, if we allow religious wars, then I am afraid this will be the end of Russia." A counter-protest in Moscow by left-wing demonstrators drew about 500 people carrying banners with slogans such as "Russian Anti-Fascist Front" and "I am Russian and therefore not a fascist." The Russian March was also opposed by the Moscow Bureau for Human Rights and Russian Jewish community headed by rabbi Berel Lazar. Krasnoyarsk youth organizations "Together!", "Krasnoyarsk Regional Student Squads", "Krasnoyarsk Youth Forum", "Yenisey Patriots" and "Youth Guards of United Russia" have prepared a written appeal to Governor of Krasnoyarsk Oblast Alexander Khloponin and city mayor Pyotr Pimashkov to prevent holding of Russian March in the city. However the Movement Against Illegal Immigration told Reuters it would go ahead with their gatherings regardless of whether they were authorized or not.

The 2006 Russian march was banned by city mayor Yuriy Luzhkov on 31 October. Despite condemning the xenophobic nature of The March, the Deputy Chief of the Moscow branch of Yabloko Alexei Navalny advocated for the permission of the event in the framework of freedom of assembly.

A separate mass-meeting called the Right March have been organized by several Orthodox movements (the National Council, the Orthodox Standard Bearers Union and The Bastion), which declared their independent intentions.

== 2017 Russian march ==
In the 2017 the Russian march, in Lyublino District, participants are reported to include several far-right organizations, such as Nationalist Party, Black Bloc led by Vladimir (Ratnikov) Komarnitsky, Nation and Freedom Committee (KNS) led by Vladimir Burmistrov and Roman Kovalyov. At the beginning of the event, some far-right activists, addressing reporters, told that the police wanted to prevent them from participating in the march, because of the symbols they were wearing. For this reason, several demonstrators broke away from the march and tried to improvise a new march on Belorechenskaya street, and they were quickly arrested along with other passersby, in the confusion. During these detentions the police threw one of women participants, knocking her unconscious. The march continued towards the Bratislavskaya Metro station and also Konstantin Filin was also detained after the far-right demonstrators shouted anti-police slogans. At the metro station several nationalist leaders made speeches from the stage, during which they talked about the repression suffered by the far right in Russia. Ivan Noviopov of the Irreconcilable League called for a "white revenge", unfurling a Confederate flag. Andrei Narodny of the National-Revolutionary Vanguard (NRA) closed his speech with a fascist salute.

== 2020 Russian march ==
Authorities of the Russian Federation denied authorization for the 2020 Russian march due to the COVID-19 pandemic. Despite the ban, dozens of nationalists gathered in the Siberian city of Barnaul on November 4, protesting against President Vladimir Putin. The organizers of the Russian march in Moscow, following the refusal, planned to lay flowers at the Federal Penitentiary Service office, to commemorate Russian neo-Nazi Maxim Martsinkevich, who died in prison one month before. The Moscow police detained at least 32 far-right activists.

== See also ==
- Russia for Russians
