= Movement Against Illegal Immigration =

Movement Against Illegal Immigration Движение против нелегальной иммиграции
- Abbreviation: DPNI (English); ДПНИ (Russian)
- Leader: Vladimir Yermolayev
- Founder: Vladimir Basmanov
- Founded: 10 July 2002
- Banned: 18 April 2011
- Succeeded by: Russkiye
- Ideology: Russian nationalism Ethnic nationalism Anti-immigration; Xenophobia; Anti-islam
- Political position: Far-right
- Colours: Black; Red
- Slogan: "For law and order!" (Russian: "За закон и порядок!") "Russia for Russians"

Party flag

Website
- www.dpni.org

The Movement Against Illegal Immigration (DPNI; Russian: Движение против нелегальной иммиграции; ДПНИ; Dvizheniye protiv nelegalnoy immigratsii, DPNI) was a Russian far-right and nationalist organization. In addition to opposing illegal immigration, the DPNI targeted Russians from ethnic, religious, and sexual minority backgrounds.

From 2008 to 2010, the DPNI was led by Aleksandr Potkin, a former member of the ultranationalist Pamyat organization. The Supreme Court of Russia declared the DPNI an extremist organisation and banned it in 2011.

== History ==
=== Foundation ===
The Movement Against Illegal Immigration was created in 2002 following an ethnic conflict in Krasnoarmeysk, Moscow Oblast between ethnic Russians and immigrants from Armenia.

Following the wounding of a Russian by an Armenian migrant, pogroms targeting Armenians took place. Over two dozen people were injured, with eight victims being hospitalized for severe injuries. On 12 July 2002, a xenophobic rally commenced in Krasnoarmeysk demanding the deportation of the migrants and the release of all Russians detained in the clashes.

=== Activities ===
The Movement Against Illegal Immigration have organized a number of rallies against illegal immigration throughout Russia.

The NDPI also takes part in carrying out the annual Russian March, a Russian ethnic pride display and protest event. Aside from mass protests the movement is active in organizing public pressure to support ethnic Russians in number of high-profile court cases involving crimes committed by the immigrants.

According to the SOVA Center, the DPNI symbol it should be interpreted as an image of a celtic cross, unfolded by 45%. The organisation uses both the black-yellow-white imperial flag (1858–1896) and the official tricolor of the Russian Federation, on which the movement symbol is placed.

=== Leadership ===
- 2002–2008: Vladimir Basmanov
- 2008–2010: Aleksandr Belov (Potkin)
- 2010–present: Vladimir Yermolayev

== Ideology ==
According to the SOVA Center, while the DPNI claimed to solely exist in illegal immigration, in reality the DPNI provided cover for attacking a broad range of ethnic and religious minorities in Russia:

"[F]ormally, DPNI opposes illegal immigration (with the exception of immigration from Slavic countries), in practice it is against "foreigners" in general. It differs from other ultra-right organizations in that it is not a rigidly hierarchical structure, but a network structure. It has a rather vague ideology, the basis of which is xenophobia and implicit racism. It readily provides itself as an "umbrella" structure to local groups of Nazi skinheads, provides them with assistance, including legal assistance. Skinheads associated with the DPNI were implicated in attacks on foreigners, representatives of sexual minorities, anti-fascists and adherents of 'non-traditional religions'."

Some liberal rights activists have filed complaints with the Russian authorities and tried to ban the DPNI because they believe it is "pursuing a fascist agenda", exemplified by slogans such as "Russia is for Russians!". During a 2007 speech, the DPNI founder asserted that "Russia will be white!" and employed antisemitic rhetoric:

We will free Europe! Russia will be white! We came here to say simple words: We are sick and tired of the power of occupants, of conquerors, and now it’s enough. We are the real power, not those who are hiding in this Torah!

— Aleksandr Belov (Potkin), founder of DPNI. Speech during the Russian March (2007)

== Political activity ==
In April 2007, former Rodina legislator Dmitry Rogozin announced the creation of a political party, the Great Russia Party, from the membership of the Congress of Russian Communities and the DPNI.

The DPNI has said it would like to see Belarusian President Alexander Lukashenko become President of Russia in 2008. This is not possible under the Russian constitution, as Lukashenko is not a citizen of Russia. Regardless, Lukashenko rejected the offer in early 2007.

== Street protest and militia activity ==
During ethnic riots in the northern Russian city of Kondopoga, in August–September 2006, the DPNI provided an up to the minute online coverage of the unfolding situation in response to what it saw as the media's politically correct silence about what was happening there. DPNI representatives arrived in the town shortly after riots had commenced, and were able to largely control the flow of news and events in the absence of any reaction from local authorities or police. The DPNI, led by their leader Aleksandr Belov (Potkin), organized an "assembly" and advocated the deportation of Chechen and other migrants within 24 hours. Belov was later indicted for disturbing the peace.

On 22 June, few DPNI members took part in inter-ethnic fighting in the center of Moscow, near the Kremlin, according to Moscow city authorities, resulting in 42 arrests. DPNI leader Belov defended the action as having been provoked by ethnic groups from the Caucasus region (Chechens, etc.) who were dancing and conducting themselves loudly when prayers were to be conducted at the Monument to the Heroes of Plevna. Estimates of participants in the fighting range from 50 to 200; other groups participating included the Slavic Union, the Russian Public National Union (RONS), and the "St. George" youth group ("георгиевцы").

On 26 June 2007, the DPNI announced the formation of armed "People's Self-Defense" groups to defend "indigenous citizens" against "the aggressive actions of criminal migrants." The groups will be trained in hand-to-hand fighting and are required to obtain "legal hunting weapons and handguns." In April 2005, the DPNI had announced creation of "mobile fighting groups", composed of cell networks of five persons each, whose members would have access to automobiles and legal weapons. The 2005 announcement cited a "possible worsening of the internal political situation in the Russian Federation and the likelihood of mass disorders and aggressive actions by foreign states."

== Ban ==
By the verdict of the Dorogomilovsky District Court of Moscow dated 28 May 2009, the leader and head of the DPNI Alexander Potkin (Belov) was found guilty of committing a crime under Part 1 of Art. 282 of the Criminal Code of the Russian Federation. The court found that, on Moscow DPNI leader's instructions, persons unidentified by the investigation attacked citizens of the Republics of Tajikistan, Uzbekistan, Vietnam, causing bodily harm.

The Movement Against Illegal Immigration was banned by the Moscow City Court on April 18, 2011. The organization has been accused of igniting interethnic hatred. However, it did not enter into force across Russia because it was appealed. At the same time, the 18 February 2011 decree of Moscow Chief Prosecutor about the suspension of the activities of the organization is in force. In August 2011, the High Court of Russian Federation has issued a federal ban of the organization.

== See also ==
- Russian Community
- Racism in Russia
- Immigration to Russia
- Russian nationalism
- Ethnic minorities in Russia
