= Leonid Khabarov =

Russian military officer and military academic

- Леонид Васильевич Хабаров
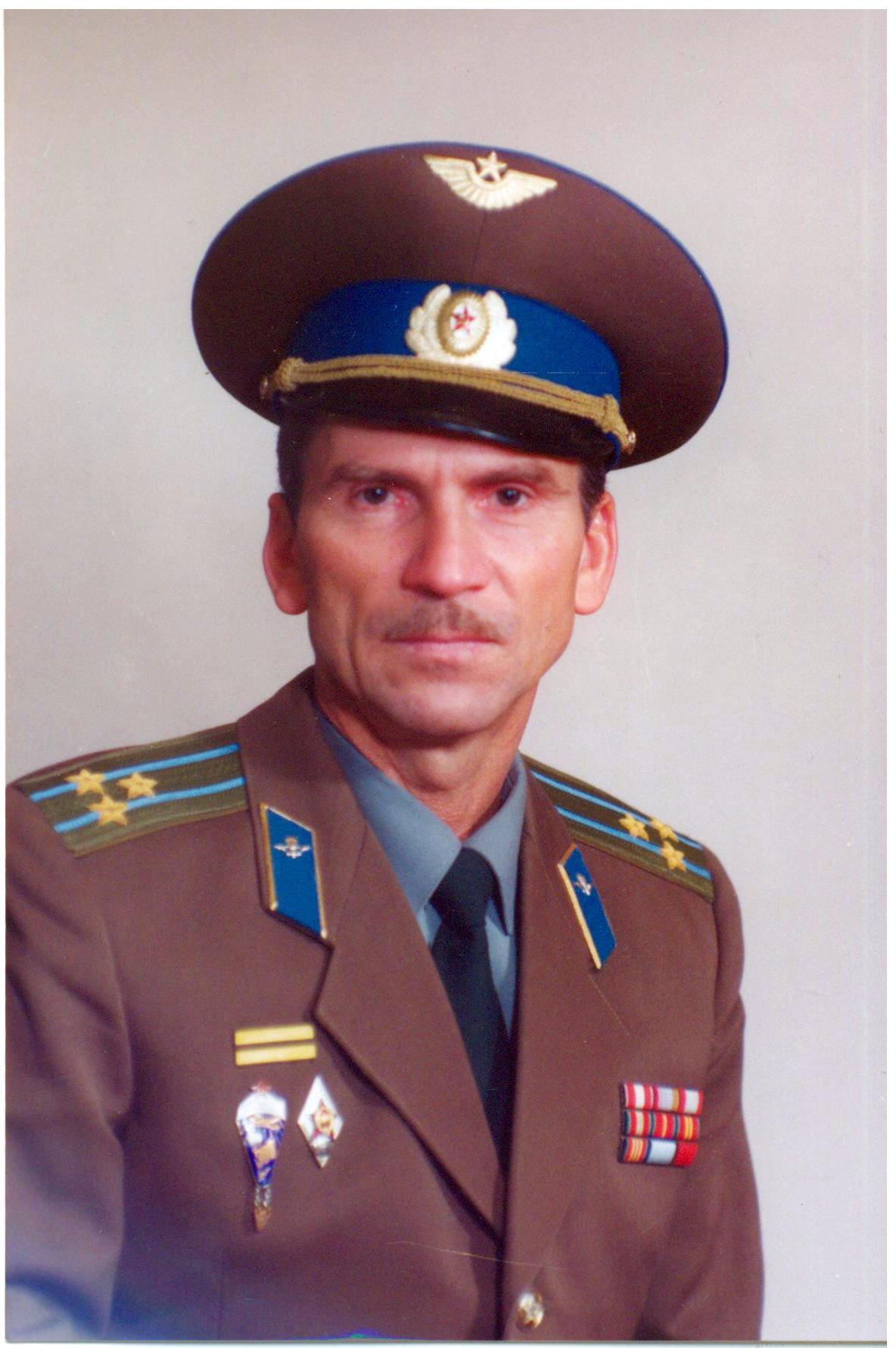
- Colonel Khabarov in his everyday service uniform
- Born: May 8, 1947 (age 79); Shadrinsk, Kurgan Oblast, RSFSR
- Relatives: see Family
- Military career
- Allegiance: USSR; Russia
- Branch: Soviet Airborne Troops
- Service years: 1966–1991 (active duty); 1991–2010 (ROTC)
- Rank: Colonel (ret.)
- Unit: 56th Guards Air Assault Brigade
- Commands: 4th Air Assault Battalion
- Conflicts: Soviet–Afghan War
- Awards: see Military awards
- Other work: see In the ROTC
- Website: "Free Colonel Khabarov!"–movement; Official website (in Russian)

Leonid Khabarov (Russian: Леони́д Васи́льевич Хаба́ров, IPA: [lʲɪɐˈnʲit xɐˈbarəf]; born May 8, 1947) is a former Soviet military officer whose battalion was the first Soviet Army unit to cross the border into the Democratic Republic of Afghanistan on December 25, 1979, marking the de facto beginning of the decade-long Soviet–Afghan War.

After a distinguished military and academic career, in 2011 Khabarov received widespread media attention after he was arrested on charges of fomenting a coup d'état while serving as a Russian Reserve Officer Training (ROT) chief. He was accused of attempting to illegally purchase weapons as part of a master plot to overthrow local authorities in the Ural region of Russia and launch a nationwide rebellion.

The sessions of Khabarov's trial were routinely rescheduled, but on February 26, 2013 the Sverdlovsk Regional Court sentenced him to 4 1/2 years in prison, despite nationwide protest. He appealed to the Supreme Court of Russia, but his case was rejected. On July 2, 2014 he was released on parole.

== Early years ==
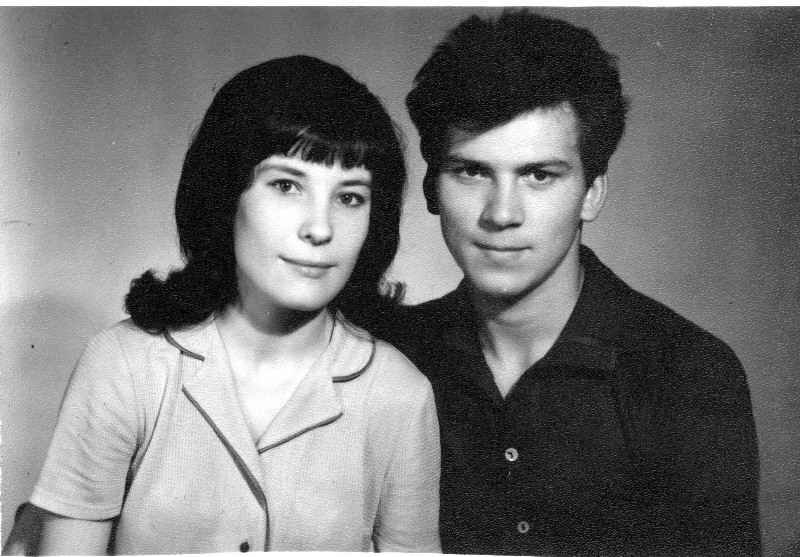
Khabarov and his then girlfriend and now wife Tonya

Khabarov was born to a military family in Shadrinsk, Kurgan Oblast, Russia on May 8, 1947. His father Vasily Khabarov was a Red Army officer and World War II veteran who died from battle injuries soon after his son was born. Khabarov's mother moved to Nizhny Tagil, where he successfully finished evening school and then vocational school. Having received a work qualification he then worked for a year as an excavator operator in the Tagil industrial area. In addition to working and studying he also participated in amateur boxing, winning several local championships.

When Khabarov became eligible for conscription he planned to attend a military aviation school but was rejected due to a nasal fracture acquired during his boxing career. He was permitted to join the Russian Airborne Troops instead. Although it was possible for a civilian to enrol directly in the airborne school without having served as a conscript, Khabarov decided to voluntarily complete his mandatory military service first. During a training jump he received a spinal injury but this did not prevent him from continuing his service. After three years as a conscript he began attending the airborne school at Ryazan,^{[a]} leaving the enlisted ranks as a sergeant.

== First command ==
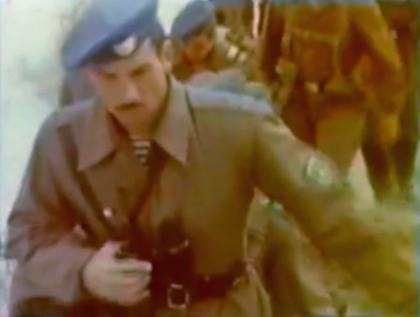
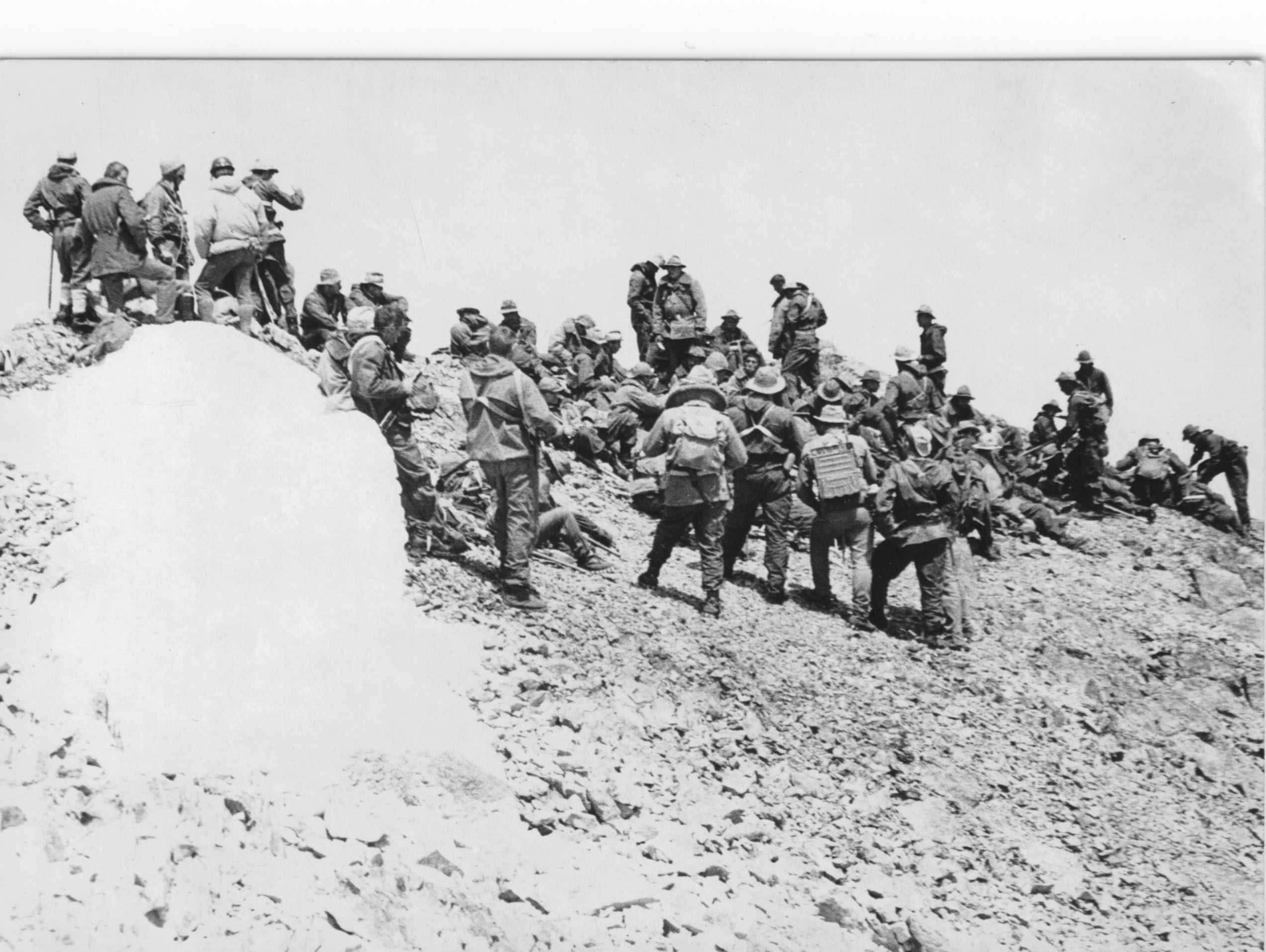
Senior Lieutenant Khabarov leading his company through the dunes of Taklamakan Desert (left.) The 100th Separate Reconnaissance Company on the top of the newly conquered VDV Peak of the Pamir Mountains (right).

After successfully graduating from the airborne school, Khabarov was assigned as commanding officer (CO) of the 100th Separate Reconnaissance Company of the Soviet Airborne Forces (VDV). He insisted on an exhausting training regime for his troops, conducting training missions in the Taklamakan Desert and climbing the Pamir peaks, one of which was named "VDV Peak" as a result.

After two years in command of the company during which it twice won the Soviet Airborne Troops Team Championship, by now Senior Lieutenant Khabarov was chosen to be the protagonist of Skies on the Shoulders, a Soviet Armed Forces half-hour promotional video that aired in 1975 across the Soviet Union and was particularly successful with conscription-eligible youths. Thus for several years he served as a military celebrity, appearing on the front page of Pravda several times.

Vasily Margelov, Commander-in-Chief of the Soviet Airborne Troops, noted during large-scale military exercises that "[Khabarov] has great prospects". Margelov insisted that Khabarov attend the Vystrel Higher Military Courses in Moscow, and following his graduation had him assigned to the 105th Guards Airborne Division as a battalion commander in Chirchik, north-east Uzbekistan.

== Service in Afghanistan ==
=== First deployment ===
At 12:00 AM on December 25, 1979 Khabarov led his battalion across the border between Uzbekistan and Afghanistan as part of the wider Soviet invasion, becoming the first unit to cross the border. He and his men quickly advanced through Mazar-i-Sharif, Kunduz, and Puli Khumri, covering 279 miles in less than eighteen hours in temperatures of minus 22 °F, in order to seize the Salang Pass, a strategic location on the way to Kabul.^{[b]} Khabarov and his garrison faced several counter-attacks over the following three months, with the first of these attacks coming in a matter of hours, only to be successfully repelled and leaving 80 mujahideen dead and nearly 150 wounded. Despite the frequent blizzards, stormy wind, and mujahideen activity, there were no Soviet casualties during that time.

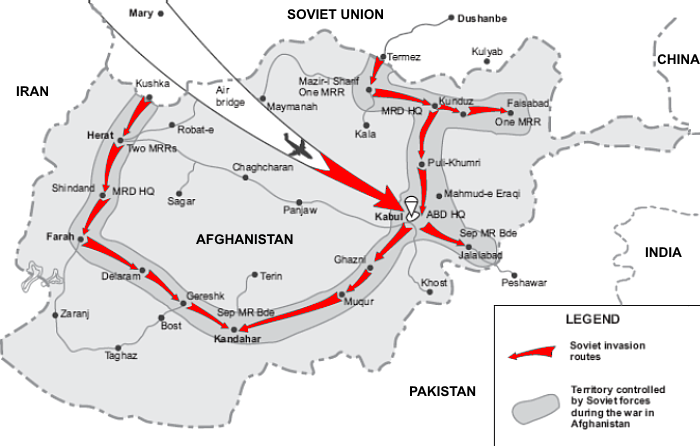

Khabarov′s air assault battalion route from the Soviet–Afghani border to the Salang Pass, covered in less than 18 hours, with air temperatures of minus 22 °F

Yuri Tukharinov, then Commander of the Soviet Forces in Afghanistan, later noted that despite almost all of the land-transported Soviet troops having to use the Salang Pass and hence all of them hearing Khabarov's name, Tukharinov himself had never met Khabarov in person. He had only heard Khabarov via radio transmissions, leading to this junior commander seeming to be a mythical King in the mountain, a hero from ancient sagas. Tukharinov was amazed when he finally met Khabarov and found him to be nothing more than a thin redheaded everyman in his thirties.

After a few months spent defending the Salang, Khabarov and his men were dispatched to Kunduz Province where they engaged in several military operations before they were called back to Kabul under the direct order of Tukharinov. The Afghani resistance had intensified its insurgency, blowing up bridges, springing ambushes in deep ravines, and setting up heavy machine-guns in caves, and Khabarov was now needed in the capital.

=== Panjshir offensive ===
In March 1980 Khabarov received an order to prepare his troops for a major offensive in Panjshir Province, a stronghold of the mujahideen. Based between Jabal-ul-Siraj and Charikar, his battalion was ordered to move through the Panjshir Valley to the very end of it and then back again in order to lure out and confront the resistance and their leader, Ahmad Shah Massoud, who had mined the only road in the valley. In the course of the mission Khabarov's troops covered the stretch from Kabul in Afghanistan to Shahimardan in Fergana Province, Uzbekistan, defeating several rebel groups and seizing documentation belonging to the Afghan National Islamic Committee along the way, including portfolios on all rebel leaders and their detailed plans.

On April 13, 1980, Khabarov and his battalion, in cooperation with units of the Afghan National Army, confronted a large group of mujahideen fighters. After killing several of them Khabarov received a shot to the head from a Type 56 assault rifle which his helmet absorbed, before being hit by a .50 caliber round that crippled his right hand, leaving him unable to fight or use the radio. Despite this he continued to command his troops via the battalion's radioman until a helicopter arrived to evacuate casualties. Khabarov ordered the most badly wounded to be evacuated first, expecting there would be no place left for him. But despite his protestations he was loaded aboard the helicopter by his subordinates.

Delivered to Kabul military hospital he nearly had his hand amputated by medical interns before his patron, Colonel General Yuri Maximov, intervened. Maximov realized that handicapping one of his most prominent officers would affect troop morale and cause negative publicity in the USSR, so he had expert surgeons operate on Khabarov, saving his life and hand. Khabarov was transferred to Tashkent and then to Burdenko General Military Clinical Hospital in Moscow, where he began his physical rehabilitation. While recovering he was promoted to major, graduated from Frunze Military Academy, and was assigned to command a mechanised infantry regiment located near the Afghan border.

=== Second deployment ===
Disliking serving as an infantry commander, Khabarov accepted a demotion from Regiment Commander to Chief-of-Staff of a brigade in order to transfer back to the 56th Air Assault Brigade. He spent 11 months with his brigade from October 1984 to September 1985, until the supply convoy he was escorting was ambushed near Barikot. His vehicle was hit by a rocket propelled grenade (RPG), turning it upside down, and Khabarov was left with a broken collarbone, three fractured ribs, and further injuries to his right hand. He was again treated in Kabul and Tashkent military hospitals, but as he recovered then-President Mikhail Gorbachev signed the Geneva Accords, leading to the Soviet withdrawal from Afghanistan in 1989. Khabarov saw this act as a direct betrayal of the friendly Afghani government headed by the pro-Soviet president Mohammad Najibullah.

Khabarov was curious to know who had shot him, since military intelligence plants had reported that the Afghan insurgency priced his life at Afs 500,000. Throughout his two deployments to Afghanistan Khabarov's goal had been to find and capture Ahmad Shah Massoud, known as the Panjshir Lion, the informal leader of the Afghan resistance, and he wondered if Massoud had been involved somehow. Khabarov and his men had encountered Massoudi troops, but Khabarov had never faced Massoud personally. While in hospital he was asked what he would have done to Massoud if he had succeeded in capturing him. Khabarov replied that there was no chance a dedicated mujahideen such as Massoud would allow himself to be captured alive by the Shuravi (Soviets)^{[c]} unless he was wounded and in a near-death condition, unable to resist. And in any case, Khabarov was reported as saying, even if he had captured Massoud he would have treated him not like a fierce enemy but rather as his close ally. Khabarov never did find out who shot him.

== Staff officer and academic career ==
Dates of rank: click on the shoulder strap to see the rank
Insignia	Rank	Component	Date
Trooper (Airborne)	Trooper	Airborne Troops	1965
Junior Sergeant (Airborne)	Jr. Sgt.	Airborne Troops	1966
Sergeant (Airborne)	Sgt.	Airborne Troops	1967
Lieutenant (Airborne)	Lt.	Airborne Troops	1972
Senior Lieutenant (Airborne)	Sr. Lt.	Airborne Troops	1975
Captain (Airborne)	Capt.	Airborne Troops	1979
Major (Airborne)	Maj.	40th Army	1980
Lieutenant Colonel (Infantry)	Lt. Col.	Turkestan Military District	1984
Lieutenant Colonel (Airborne)	Lt. Col.	40th Army	1986
Lieutenant Colonel (Infantry)	Lt. Col.	Carpathian Military District	1987
Colonel (Airborne)	Col.	Airborne Troops	1991

=== Refusing retirement ===
Having recovered from his injuries Khabarov was assigned to a staff position at the Carpathian Military District, quartered in Lviv, Ukraine. He was given a large apartment in the city and a quiet office job, later describing his life in Lviv as idyllic and his work the equivalent of "fraying pants".

In 1991 Khabarov celebrated 25 years of active duty service and faced approaching retirement age. He had the option of retiring early with a medical discharge, due to the severity of the injuries he had suffered. However, he decided not to go on the pension and asked his superiors for a chance to remain in service. The high-ranking airborne officer Georgy Shpak, then Volga–Urals Military District Deputy Chief, aided Khabarov in getting a transfer from the Carpathian Military District to the Urals, where he received the unusual assignment of a chair in military studies at the Ural State University in Yekaterinburg.

=== Academic success ===
Times were tough for military education as a plethora of educational facilities had been closed due to budget revisions and the chaotic situation which emerged following the collapse of the Soviet Union in the late 1980s and early 1990s. Khabarov embraced the challenge, discovering a completely new military realm for himself in the training of reserve officers. The official objective of such education was to cross-train civil specialists, engineers, and medics in order to give them a set of supplementary military skills in addition to their basic university degree program. In fact it had turned out to be a safe harbor for draft evaders, providing them with the opportunity to dodge the mandatory active duty and receive officer's rank as a plus. Military officers who led these facilities were not keen to turn them into boot camps and thus the situation had remained stale for decades.The Ural program was no exception, with the Joint Military Chair of the Ural Industrial Institute not having experienced any significant changes since its establishment in 1937.

Khabarov used draconian measures to turn his university chair into a high-profile educational facility, able to compete with conventional military schools and academies. Within a year he had expanded the military chair into a military department, and after a decade of his deanship it branched off into a separate mil-tech educational facility, now re-named the Institute for Military Technical Education and Security (IMTES). In doing this he wrested T-72, T-80, and T-90 battle tanks for the institute's car park from the Russian Ground Forces depots; he conducted military exercises for his trainees in cooperation with the Volga–Urals Military District Command; he hosted conferences that were attended by senior military officials and heads of military education facilities from across the country and beyond; and in 1996 the institute's reconnaissance sub-department was visited by members of the U.S. Special Forces. Apart from training his cadets in conventional warfare tactics, he encouraged innovative scientific research among his subordinates including a military robotics program, launched by the institute seniors under his direct academic guidance.

The results were not long in coming. In 2003 Khabarov's outfit was considered to be the best educational facility in the entire Russian military, and in 2004 he was regarded as the best military academic in the country. Khabarov's tankmen were named as the best specialists in the Russian military in 1998, 2003, and 2005. As were his "flaks" and "picks′n′shovels" in 2006.

=== Back to Afghanistan ===
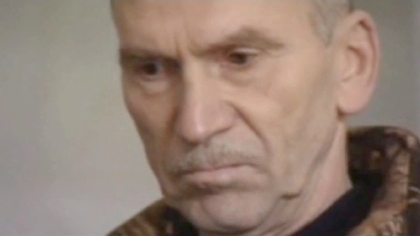
"Rest in peace, good buddy." Colonel Khabarov standing by the grave of his lifelong rival Ahmad Shah Massoud in 2009

In late February 2009, Col. Khabarov and two other veterans, 22nd Separate Spetsnaz Brigade Sgt. Victor Babenko and 345th Guards Airborne Regiment Sgt. Maj. Evgeny Teterin, visited the Islamic Republic of Afghanistan on a veterans′ tour along their service paths, going all the way through the Panjshir mountains where the fierce battles of the 1980s had unfolded. Together they visited Salang Pass and met the officer in charge of the place, now a Colonel General of the Afghan Army rather than the mere captain Khabarov had been during his time in charge there.

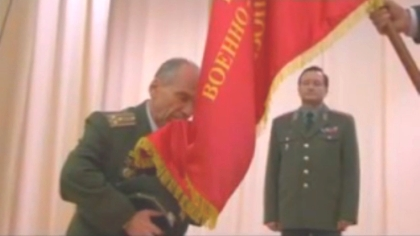
Khabarov kissing the war banner of his unit during the farewell ceremony in 2010

At the end of their journey they visited Bazarak village in the Panjshir Valley, the burial place of Ahmad Shah Massoud. Never having met Massoud face to face, Khabarov asked his fellow companions to leave him alone for a minute, saying: "Would you excuse us, guys. Ahmad and I wish to have a private chat."

In 2010, after almost 20 years of training reserve officers, Khabarov finally retired from service.

== Military awards and citations ==
Col. Khabarov's ribbon chart: click on the ribbon bar to see the award
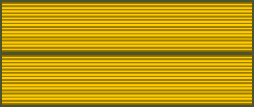

For his service during the Afghan war Khabarov was awarded the Order of the Red Banner; both classes of the Medal "For Distinction in Military Service"; all three classes of the Medal "For Impeccable Service"; and the Armed Forces of the USSR Veteran's Medal. After the fall of the Soviet Union he was awarded the Order of Military Merit and several honorary titles in recognition of his past exploits and actions.

Just after he was assigned to Kabul in 1980 his subordinates sent a letter to Moscow without informing him in which they described Khabarov's actions while he was in charge of Salang and its neighboring area, and asking that he be named a Hero of the Soviet Union, the supreme Soviet military and civil award. The letter was submitted for consideration, but at that time the Politburo was denying there was any armed confrontation in Afghanistan, and hence no such thing as a war going on there. Thus Khabarov's nomination was suspended indefinitely, and he never received the award.

After the USSR collapsed this effort on Khabarov's behalf received another boost. Sazhi Umalatova, a former Soviet parliamentarian was elected Head of the Presidium of the Supreme Soviet of the USSR which then established its own medals and orders. After the Presidium found out that Khabarov had been nominated as a Hero of the Soviet Union they awarded him with the "Veteran Internationalist Medal" as an acknowledgement of his Afghan feats, and the "80 Years of the Soviet Armed Forces" Jubilee Medal in recognition of his 25 years spent as an active duty soldier and almost 20 years of service with the ROT. Khabarov and other veterans accepted these awards, even though many thought that the USSR would be restored in a few years. Khabarov later commented: "I did serve political leaders. I served for the sake of the country — the Soviet Union — Russia — my Motherland."

== Family ==
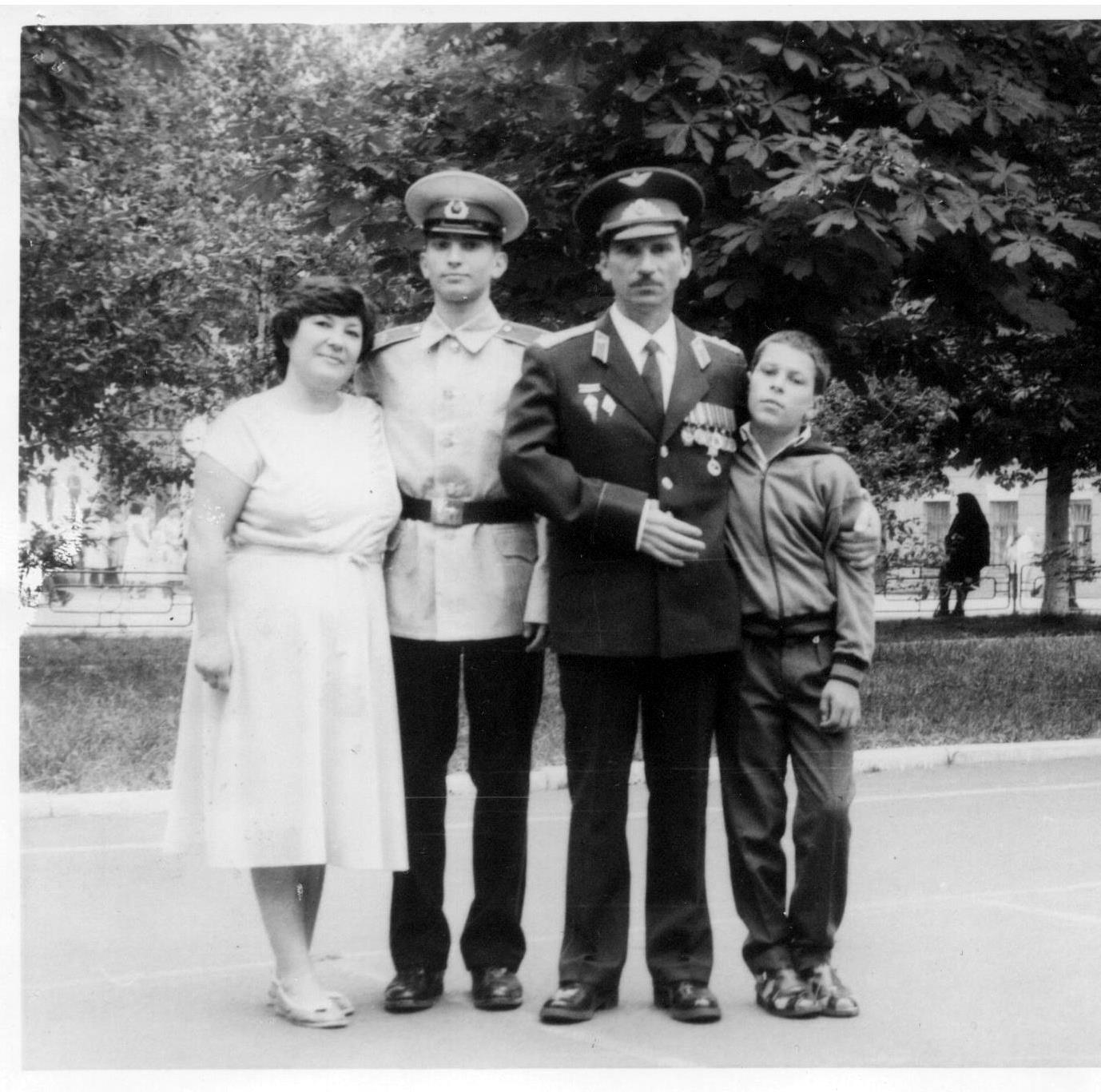
Col. Leonid Khabarov and his wife Tonya in the mid-1980s with their two children – Vitaly (dressed in cadet's uniform) and Dmitry

Being a third-generation military man after his father and grandfather,^{[d]} Khabarov had decided to continue the family tradition with his wife Tonya and two sons Vitaly (born: 1975) and Dmitry (born: 1978) following him on his various postings to remote places in the Soviet Union. Growing up as military brats, his sons both followed their father's pathway and, despite their mother's protests, both enrolled in the Ryazan Airborne School.^{[a]}

Vitaly graduated from the airborne school in the mid-1990s and was assigned to serve with the 106th Guards Airborne Division. He spent his tour of duty in Chechnya, engaging in the First Russo-Chechen Conflict, and since then has served as chief-of-staff with the 242nd Airborne Training Center in Omsk with the rank of Lieutenant Colonel.

Dmitry graduated from airborne school in the late 1990s and volunteered to serve in the Chechen war on terror. As the CO of a reconnaissance platoon, he managed to locate and destroy two training facilities of the Chechen insurgency; intercepted and captured a major reinforcement of mercenaries and mujahideen from various Arab states on their way to join the rebel army; blew up two arms and ammunition depots; and achieved several minor successes. Although none of his men were killed or badly wounded during the missions, on his way back to the compound one day Dimitry was severely injured by a land mine. His subordinates evacuated him to their army base and from there he was transported by helicopter to Mozdok, in the Republic of North Ossetia–Alania and then to Moscow, where he was cared for in the same military hospital his father had been in 20 years earlier. Although army surgeons successfully saved his legs, his injuries prevented him from returning to active duty. The military instead honorary discharged him with the rank of major.

== Post-retirement life ==
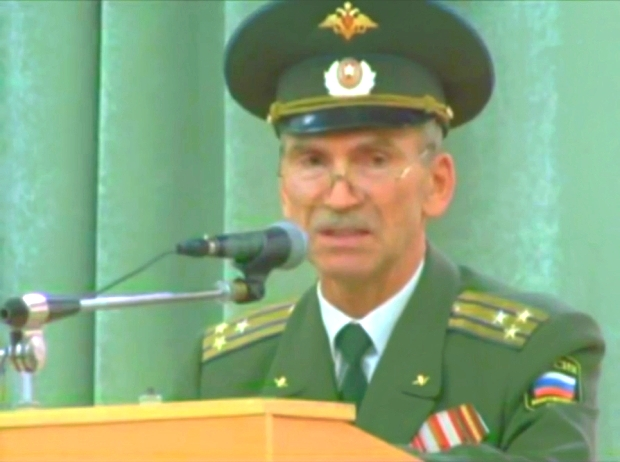
Khabarov addressing young servicemen during his farewell speech in 2010

In 2004 Khabarov senior had been elected deputy chairman of the local organization of Afghan veterans in Yekatarinburg. Still only in his mid-sixties, Khabarov continued his public activity as a supporter of the military after retiring in 2010. In particular he was a staunch critic of Anatoly Serdyukov, a civilian functionary at the head of the Russian Ministry of Defence, publicly accusing him of sabotage and destruction of the Armed Forces. Khabarov claimed that Serdyukov, during his incumbency, had succeeded in the destruction of the Russian Army in a way that the CIA could only have dreamt of during the Cold War. He also referred to Serdyukov as a state criminal rather than a politician.

=== Arrest ===
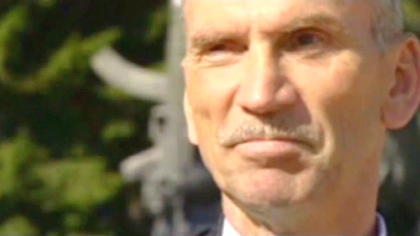
Khabarov during a television interview, a month prior to his arrest in 2011

In 2011 Khabarov was arrested by operatives of the Russian Federal Security Service (FSB), which announced that Khabarov had planned a major upheaval on Airborne Troops Day, August 2, 2011. According to the ITAR-TASS news agency, the prosecution claimeed that Khabarov's group of "People's Militia named after Minin and Pozharsky" planned to launch an operation codenamed "Dawn" to overthrow official authorities in the region.

A search of Khabarov's apartment revealed a custom-made sabre presented to Khabarov in the early 2000s by then Minister of Defence Sergei Ivanov, and an out-of-date promedol capsule from a soldier's medical kit which Khabarov had kept as a memento of his Afghan service in the 1980s. These were immediately submitted as criminal evidence of his intentions, along with a copy of Dangerous By His Faithfulness To Russia, a 2006 book by Vladimir Kvachkov that was found in Khabarov's personal library. It was submitted in evidence as "extremist literature", despite the book being freely available to buy and not listed on the Federal List of Extremist Materials. It has been suggested that Serdyukov and his henchmen were behind Khabarov's arrest and subsequent trial.

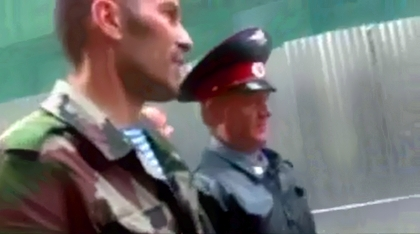
Khabarov's younger son Maj. Dmitry Khabarov (in camouflage uniform) on his way to the Presidential Administration of Russia to submit an official letter to the Russian president entitled: "A War Banner is not a Floor Rag"

=== Backlash ===
Many prominent figures in Russian politics expressed outrage over Khabarov's imprisonment. Among them were individuals with diametrically opposed political views such as the presidential candidates Leonid Ivashov and Gennady Zyuganov, as well as other political figures, including Andrey Illarionov, Andrey Savelyev, Maxim Shevchenko, Alexey Dymovsky, Maxim Kalashnikov, Irek Murtazin, Mikhail Delyagin, Ashot Egiazaryan, Aleksandr Kharchikov, Dmitry Puchkov, and others.

Khabarov's supporters have claimed that the accusations do not hold water, pointing to the ridiculousness of the collected "evidence" against him. Khabarov's colleague, Col. Vladislav Zyomkovsky, said during an interview with PublicPost that the officially announced denunciation of a failed masterplan doesn't stand up to critical examination, for in his opinion, a brilliant military strategist such as Khabarov would never develop such an obvious plan. To refute the official version of the failed plot, Zyomkovsky cited a paragraph from Khabarov's bill of indictment which states that Khabarov and his alleged accomplices planned to switch off the entire region's electrical grid and thus create panic and civil disorder. In his opinion this passage was copy-pasted from an indictment used in the criminal trials of the 1930s, when such an event would really have spread chaos. But in Russia in the 2000s, electrical outages happened on a daily basis, a routine and quite common occurrence.

== Footnotes ==
- ^{a} Ryazan Airborne School (Russian: Рязанское высшее воздушно-десантное командное краснознамённое училище имени Ленинского комсомола,) is a still-functioning four-year study facility, established on August 2, 1941, to graduate commanding officers and para specialists for military and civil organisations and agencies, including: the Soviet Airborne Troops; the Air Assault Troops (DShV); airborne reconnaissance units of the Soviet Ground Forces and Soviet Tank Corps; air assault units of the Soviet Naval Infantry; SAR-teams of the Soviet Air Forces; spetsnaz units of the Main Intelligence Directorate (GRU); and special anti-terrorist units of the Committee for State Security (KGB). Along with the Russian-speaking cadets, Ryazan Airborne School also graduated Eastern European, South American, Caribbean, African, and Asian students from friendly socialist countries and liberation movements. Renowned alumni of the school include: Levan Sharashenidze, former Defense Minister of Georgia; Wojciech Jaruzelski, the last Communist leader of Poland from 1981 to 1989; and Amadou Toumani Touré, President of Mali from 2002 to 2012.
- ^{b} Salang Pass and the tunnel underneath it is a high-risk military object which could be paralysed by a smoke grenade. At 8800 feet long, extremely narrow, and with no ventilation apertures, the giant tunnel could be smoked out in a matter of seconds. There were several lethal incidents during the Soviet military campaign in Afghanistan in which personnel in Soviet supply convoys were choked by the carbon monoxide contained in the diesel exhaust when the head truck got stuck at one of the tunnel's ends (see Salang Tunnel fire.) It has also been known for the deadly avalanches which struck it time after time (see Salang avalanches.) However, while Khabarov was in charge of the Salang and its surroundings there were no casualties on the Soviet side.
- ^{c} Shuravi or Shouravi (Persian: شوروی) is a Parsi word, which stands for "Soviets." Contrary to other derogatory terms (e.g. yankees,) the term itself bears no negative connotation,and has been used by both the Afghans and Soviet military men in Afghanistan. Various terms were coined from the Afghans′ everyday language such as Salam (short for "Peace, man!"), Bacha ("Buddy"), etc.
- ^{d} Vasily Khabarov was a Red Army officer and a World War II veteran, a Red Banner and Red Star recipient. His latter assignment was a Regiment Chief-of-staff; Stepan Khabarov, was a Russian Imperial Army officer, a St. George Cross cavalier, and a veteran of the Russo-Japanese War, World War I, and the Russian Civil War in Siberia and the Far East. His latter assignment was as a Regiment Commander.
