= People's Militia named after Minin and Pozharsky =

People's Militia named after Minin and Pozharsky Народное ополчение имени Минина и Пожарского
- Abbreviation: NOMP (English); НОМП (Russian)
- Leader: Vladimir Kvachkov
- Founded: 21 February 2009
- Banned: 18 February 2015
- Merger of: Movement Against Illegal Immigration; Russian Imperial Movement; Russian All-National Union; Left Front
- Headquarters: 106th building, Narodnogo Opolcheniya Street, Moscow, Russia. 121059
- Newspaper: ParaBellum
- Ideology: Russian nationalism Ultranationalism; Antisemitism; Militarism; Orthodox nationalism Soviet patriotism
- Political position: Far-right
- National affiliation: National Patriotic Forces of Russia; Russian National Front
- Colours: Black; Gold; White; Red

Website
- narodpolk.org pbrus.org

The People's Militia named after Minin and Pozharsky (NOMP; Russian: Народное ополчение имени Минина и Пожарского; НОМП; Narodnoye opolcheniye imeni Minina i Pozharskogo, NOMP), also known as People's Militia of Kvachkov (Russian: Народное ополчение Квачкова; Narodnoye opolcheniye Kvachkova) was an unregistered Russian public organization. In February 2015, it was recognized as a terrorist organization by a court decision.

== Creation ==
It was created in February 2009 by GRU сolonel Vladimir Kvachkov. An appeal “People's militia today” was issued, which, in particular, said:

... the names of Minin and Pozharsky are included in the name of the organization because of the striking similarity of the current situation in Russia with the situation four centuries ago. Confusion at the very top - you will not understand who runs the country ... inter-clan squabbles ... betrayal of the boyars ... theft and arbitrariness ... robbery in the streets ... invasion from the West.

Yuri Ekishev became a member of the NOMP headquarters and Kvachkov's chief assistant, who in 2007 was sentenced to two years in prison for inciting ethnic hatred.

The NOMP includes representatives of the Union of Officers, the Movement Against Illegal Immigration (DPNI), the Russian Imperial Movement, the Russian All-National Union (RONS), the Military Power Union of Russia, and the Left Front. NOMP cells were established in more than forty regions of Russia.

== Trials ==
On December 23, 2010, Kvachkov was detained by FSB officers in his apartment on charges of organizing rebellion and terrorism.

At the end of July 2011, the FSB reported that members of the local cell of the People's Militia had been detained in Yekaterinburg. The detainees were charged with organizing a terrorist group and preparing a riot. According to investigators, on the morning of August 2, 2011 (on the Paratroopers' Day), several armed combat detachments with a backbone of former special forces were supposed to break into the buildings of the Yekaterinburg branches of GUVD, FSB, MChS and kill their leaders. The same detachments were entrusted with the capture of warehouses with weapons. Groups of saboteurs were supposed to blow up the power substations of Yekaterinburg in order to de-energize the city and spread panic among the population. Further, the rebels allegedly planned to mobilize and arm the entire male population of Yekaterinburg and hold the defense with such forces until they receive help from neighboring regions. The leader of the fighting cell is called entrepreneur Alexander Ermakov, who, according to the investigation, not only developed a plan for the insurrection, code-named "Dawn", but also recruited supporters among retired military and security officials dissatisfied with the reforms in the country. Four more - 64-year-old colonel-"afghan" Leonid Khabarov, former criminal investigator Vladislav Ladeyshchikov, entrepreneur Sergei Katnikov, doctor of sciences, inventor Viktor Kralin were detained on July 19 in Ermakov's office. They were all airsoft players.

On February 8, 2013, the Moscow City Court sentenced Vladimir Kvachkov to 13 years in a strict regime colony for preparing an armed mutiny. The second defendant, Alexander Kiselev, was sentenced to 11 years in a strict regime. The verdict says that it was established that in 2009 Kvachkov offered his supporters in various cities to take part in an armed rebellion, which was supposed to begin on June 24, 2010. His trusted man, Manrik, picked people up and they underwent military training at the training ground in Myakinino. In 2010, Kiselev in St. Petersburg picked up a group of ten people and acquired weapons. Kvachkov and his supporters were going to start a mutiny in Kovrov. It was planned to seize the buildings of the MVD, the FSB, the MChS of Kovrov, as well as weapons and ammunition in small groups. The success of the armed mutiny in Kovrov was supposed to provoke similar events in other regions, according to their plans. One of the main pieces of evidence in the case was the recording of a conversation between several supporters of Kvachkov, when they were developing a plan for a sortie into Kovrov, intelligence, distribution of funds and human resources.

In May 2012, a trial began in the Sverdlovsk Regional Court on charges against Khabarov, Ladeyshchikov, Katnikov and Kralin. As Ladeyshchikov explained to the investigation, his comrades-in-arms set before him "tasks of operational work." In particular, he had to find ways for the militants to approach and withdraw to the building of the Yekaterinburg synagogue, track the schedule and routes of movement of the Sverdlovsk rabbi Zelig Ashkenazi for his subsequent liquidation. The murder of the rabbi was supposed to be committed by a nonresident combat group that arrived in Yekaterinburg "under the guise of airsoft players". The defendants also allegedly planned the elimination of the heads of the power structures of the Sverdlovsk region. The mutiny was supposed to begin with the blowing up of the power lines feeding Yekaterinburg. Then the conspirators had to break into the military units stationed in the city, after which the military, according to the plan, had to go over to the side of the "revolutionaries". Further, having “mobilized the citizens of Sverdlovsk,” the “People's Militia” was going to move to Moscow to overthrow the government. The conspirators had pistols and revolvers, some of which were training, and some were combat. But an expert examination found that of all the seized weapons, only one pistol was suitable for shooting.

Ladeyshchikov was the only one of all the accused who confessed to the investigation. Therefore, charges of preparing for a mutiny were dropped from him. He was charged only with the commission of crimes under Art. 205.1, part 1 (threat of committing a terrorist act) and Art. 222, part 2 (illegal acquisition, transfer, sale and storage of ammunition and explosive devices) of the Criminal Code of the Russian Federation. Alexander Ermakov was declared insane and sent for compulsory treatment.

On February 26, 2013, a verdict was passed in this case. Leonid Khabarov and Viktor Kralin were sentenced to 4.5 years in a general regime penal colony each (they were found guilty only under the articles "Assistance in terrorist activities" and "Illegal acquisition, transfer, sale, storage, transportation or carrying of firearms, ammunition, explosive substances "), Alexander Ladeyshchikov received a 2-year suspended sentence. S. Katnikov, who pleaded guilty, also received a suspended sentence. In July 2014, L. Khabarov was released, and in January 2015, V. Kralin was released.. On February 7, 2019, the Zubovo-Polyansky Court of Mordovia ruled to release Kvachkov from punishment for extremism. Since the first part of Article 282 (extremism) ceased to be a criminal offense, the court ruled to release Kvachkov from serving his sentence. The time limit for the attempted rebellion has already expired. February 19, 2019 Kvachkov was released.
