= List of Umalatova awards =

The post-Soviet, Russian socialist political Party of Peace and Unity under the leadership of Sazhi Umalatova issued a number of orders, decorations and medals on the behalf of the unregistered NGO "Permanent Presidium of the Congress of People's Deputies of the Soviet Union" (ППСНД СССР, PPSND). Some were original or reminted Soviet awards, others were new but retained the communist aesthetics dating to before the dissolution of the USSR.

The awards listed below were issued between 1994 and 2010, they are commonly called "Umalatova awards" (Russian: Награды Умалатовой) after the party leader.

== Post-Soviet Union Umalatova "Awards" ==
=== "Orders" ===
Medal	Badge and Ribbon	Name (English/Russian/Translit)	Creation Date	Description
		Order of the Defender of Soviets (Order of the Defender of Freedom); Орден «Защитнику Советов» ("Защитнику свободы"); Orden Zashhitniku Sovetov ("Zashhitniku svobody")	22 September 1994	Awarded to the defenders of the Supreme Soviet of Russia during the 1993 constitutional crisis
		Order of Stalin; Орден "Сталина"; Orden "Stalina"	4 March 1998	The post-Soviet Presidium's highest award

=== "Medals" ===
Badge and Ribbon	Name (English/Russian/Translit)	Creation Date	Description	Number Awarded
	Medal for 50 Years of Soviet Victory in the Great Patriotic War 1941–1945; Медаль "50 лет Победы советского народа в Великой Отечественной войне 1941–1945 гг."	7 February 1997		
	Medal of Marshal of the Soviet Union Zhukov; Медаль "Маршал Советского Союза Жуков"	20 February 1997		
	Medal for 80 Years of the Great October Socialist Revolution; Медаль "80 лет Великой Октябрьской социалистической революции"	25 September 1997		
	Medal for 80 Years of the Armed Forces of the Soviet Union; Медаль "80 лет Вооруженных сил СССР"	10 December 1997		
	Medal of Fleet Admiral of the Soviet Union Kuznetsov; Медаль "Адмиралу флота Советского Союза Кузнецову"	7 April 1998		
	Medal for 80 Years of Border Troops of the USSR; Медаль "80 лет пограничным войскам СССР"	6 May 1998		
	Medal for 80 Years of VChK-KGB; Медаль "80 лет ВЧК-КГБ"	12 August 1998		
	Medal for 80 Years of VLKSM; Медаль "80 лет ВЛКСМ"	14 October 1998		
	Medal for Veteran Internationalist; Медаль "Ветерану-Интернационалисту"	16 October 1998		
	Medal for 50 Years of Nuclear Power Engineering of the Soviet Union; Медаль "50 лет ядерной энергетике СССР"	16 October 1998		
	Medal In Commemoration of the 120th Anniversary of the Birth of I.V. Stalin; Медаль "В ознаменование 120-летия со дня рождения И.В.Сталина"	15 August 1999	Presented as an equal accompanying the award of the 100th birthday of Vladimir Lenin.	
	Medal for the 55th Anniversary of the Soviet Victory in the Great Patriotic War 1941–1945; Медаль "55 лет победы советского народа в Великой Отечественной войне 1941–1945 гг."	18 November 1999		
	Medal for 70 Years of the Creation of the Airborne Troops of the Soviet Union; Медаль "70 лет создания Воздушно-Десантных войск СССР"	30 June 2000		
	Medal for 60 Years of Soviet Victory in the Great Patriotic War 1941–1945; Медаль "60 лет Победы советского народа в Великой Отечественной войне 1941–1945 гг."	7 April 2005		
	Medal for 90 Years of the October Revolution; Медаль "90 лет Октябрьской Революции"	2006		
	Medal for 85 Years of the Foundation of the USSR; Медаль "85 лет образования СССР"	20 November 2007		
	Medal for 90 Years of the Armed Forces of the Soviet Union; Медаль "90 лет Вооруженных сил СССР"	20 January 2008		
	Medal for 90 Years of Border Troops of the USSR; Медаль "90 лет пограничным войскам СССР"	2008		
	Medal for 90 Years of the VLKSM; Медаль "90 лет ВЛКСМ"	7 July 2008		
	Medal "20 Years of withdrawal of Soviet troops from Afghanistan"; Медаль "20 лет вывода Советских войск из Афганистана"	3 September 2008		
	Medal In Commemoration of the 130th Anniversary of the Birth of I.V. Stalin; Медаль "В ознаменование 130-летия со дня рождения И.В.Сталина"	3 September 2009		
	Medal for the 65th Anniversary of the Soviet Victory in the Great Patriotic War 1941–1945 Медаль «65 лет победы советского народа в Великой Отечественной войне 1941—1945 гг.»	2010		
	Medal "Participant of the Liquidation of the Accident at the Chernobyl Nuclear Power Plant" Медаль «Участнику ликвидации аварии на Чернобыльской атомной электростанции»	unknown, before 2008	Considered to be one of the rarest of the Umalatova awards	

== See also ==
- Orders, decorations, and medals of the Soviet Union
- List of orders, decorations, and medals of the Russian Federation
- Party of Peace and Unity
- List of political parties in Russia
