= Party of Peace and Unity =

Party of Peace and Unity Партия мира и единства
- Abbreviation: PME (English); ПМЕ (Russian)
- Leader: Sazhi Umalatova
- Founder: Sazhi Umalatova; Ivan Shashviashvili
- Founded: 14 December 1996; 29 years ago 12 May 2012; 13 years ago (refoundation)
- Dissolved: 23 November 2008; 17 years ago
- Merged into: Patriots of Russia (2008–2012)
- Headquarters: 4/3th building, Kuznetsky Most Street; Moscow, Russia
- Newspaper: Voice of unity
- Ideology: Internationalism; Eurasianism; Anti-Americanism; Soviet nationalism
- National affiliation: All-Russia People's Front
- Colours: Red; Purple
- Slogan: "Peace People Unity" (Russian: "Мир Народ Единство")
- Seats in the State Duma: 0 / 450
- Seats in the Regional Parliaments: 0 / 3,994

Party flag

Website
- http://pmerf.ru/

Party of Peace and Unity (PME; Russian: Партия мира и единства; ПМЕ; Partiya mira i yedinstva, PME) was a political party in Russia.

It was founded in 1996, uniting several communist groups that opposed president Yeltsin's policies. Its leader was Sazhi Umalatova, a Russian politician of Chechen nationality, who was a devoted opponent of Mikhail Gorbachev and Boris Yeltsin. Umalatova supported the August coup in 1991 and the anti-Yeltsin opposition in the October 1993 events. However, she later became an ardent supporter of President Vladimir Putin.

At the December 7, 2003 legislative elections, the party won 0.25% of the popular vote and no seats. The party did not participate in the 2007 legislative election and merged with the party Patriots of Russia in 2008.

The party received 34 million barrels worth of oil vouchers in the United Nations Oil-for-Food Programme, according to the paper "The Beneficiaries of Saddam's Oil Vouchers: The List of 270".

The party was revived on May 24, 2012
