= Alexey Dymovsky =

Russian police officer

- Алексей Дымовский
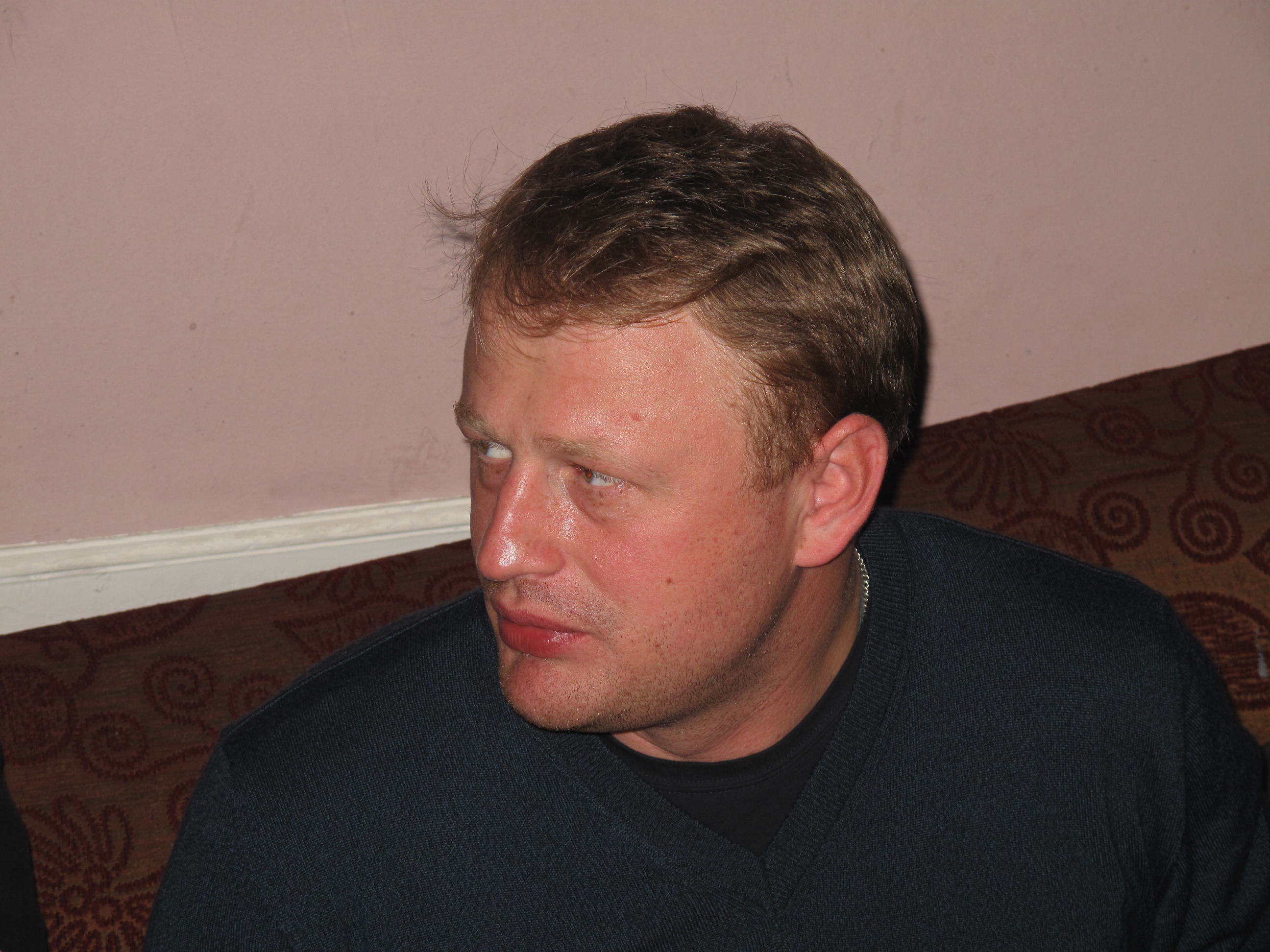
- Alexey Dymovsky, November 2009.
- Born: 28 August 1977 (age 49); Blagoveshchensk, Russian SFSR, Soviet Union
- Other name: Aniskin
- Relatives: Olesya (spouse); Diana (adoptee)
- Police career
- Department: Internal Affairs Directorate of Novorossiysk
- Service years: 2000–2009
- Rank: 2009 – commissioned as a Major
- Other work: Founder of the White Ribbon (NGO)

Alexey Alexandrovich Dymovsky (Russian: Алексе́й Алекса́ндрович Дымо́вский; born 28 August 1977) is a former militsiya officer who became famous in Russia for speaking out against corruption in law enforcement agencies in November 2009.

He was fired and detained on fraud charges in January 2010, but the charges were later dropped.

== Early life and career ==
Alexey Dymovsky was born on 28 August 1977 in Blagoveshchensk, Amur Oblast, Soviet Union. In 1992, he graduated from the 11th Secondary School in Svobodny and entered the Svobodnensky Railway Technical School, receiving a degree in 1996. On leaving education, he completed his service in the Russian Ground Forces between 1996 and 1998, and had been working in the Ministry of Internal Affairs since February 2000.

He served as a precinct officer at the Department of Internal Affairs (OVD) of Svobodny until 2004, and then was transferred to the Internal Affairs Directorate (UVD) of Novorossiysk, Krasnodar Krai. In 2005, he was appointed as an operative agent of the Novorossiysk UVD's operative search unit. In November 2007, Dymovsky took up his post as a senior operative agent of the murder investigation division, and had held the same post at the drug traffic control division since 2008. In May 2009, Dymovsky was conferred the rank of major in exchange for a promise to jail an innocent person, which he subsequently was unable to fulfill.

== Video appeals ==
Dymovsky decided to post video appeals on the Internet in part due to pressure that had started to be exerted on him at work following his unsuccessful attempt to raise his concerns during an annual TV program, Direct Line with Vladimir Putin, in 2006. During the program, Dymovsky had submitted a question to then-President Vladimir Putin, asking when outrages would end in the Novorossiysk militsiya. The question, which had been recorded, was never broadcast. According to Dymovky, when his call had become known in the workplace, heavy pressure began to be exerted on him; this pressure was so severe that when the Presidential Administration called him back with regards to his claims, he dared not to testify.

In his video appeals to Prime Minister Putin, Dymovsky claimed that corruption in the militsiya was endemic and such practices as accusing innocent people in order to meet official crime detection targets and taking money to frame innocent people were widespread.

The first part of Dymovsky's video appeal has been watched on YouTube more than 725,000 times.

Dymovsky was fired from the police soon after posting the videos. His YouTube messages prompted a wave of videos from other Russian police officers describing corruption and the framing of innocent people.

== 2019 arrest ==
In October 2019, he was arrested for TNT possession while riding a taxicab. Prior to his arrest, Dymovsky uploaded a video in which he states the explosives are real evidence, which his former police colleagues threw out in the urban periphery instead of destroying them. He further contends that, after keeping them for a while, he decided to voluntarily hand them over to the police.

== See also ==
- Frank Serpico
