= Sazhi Umalatova =

Russian political activist

- Сажи Умалатова
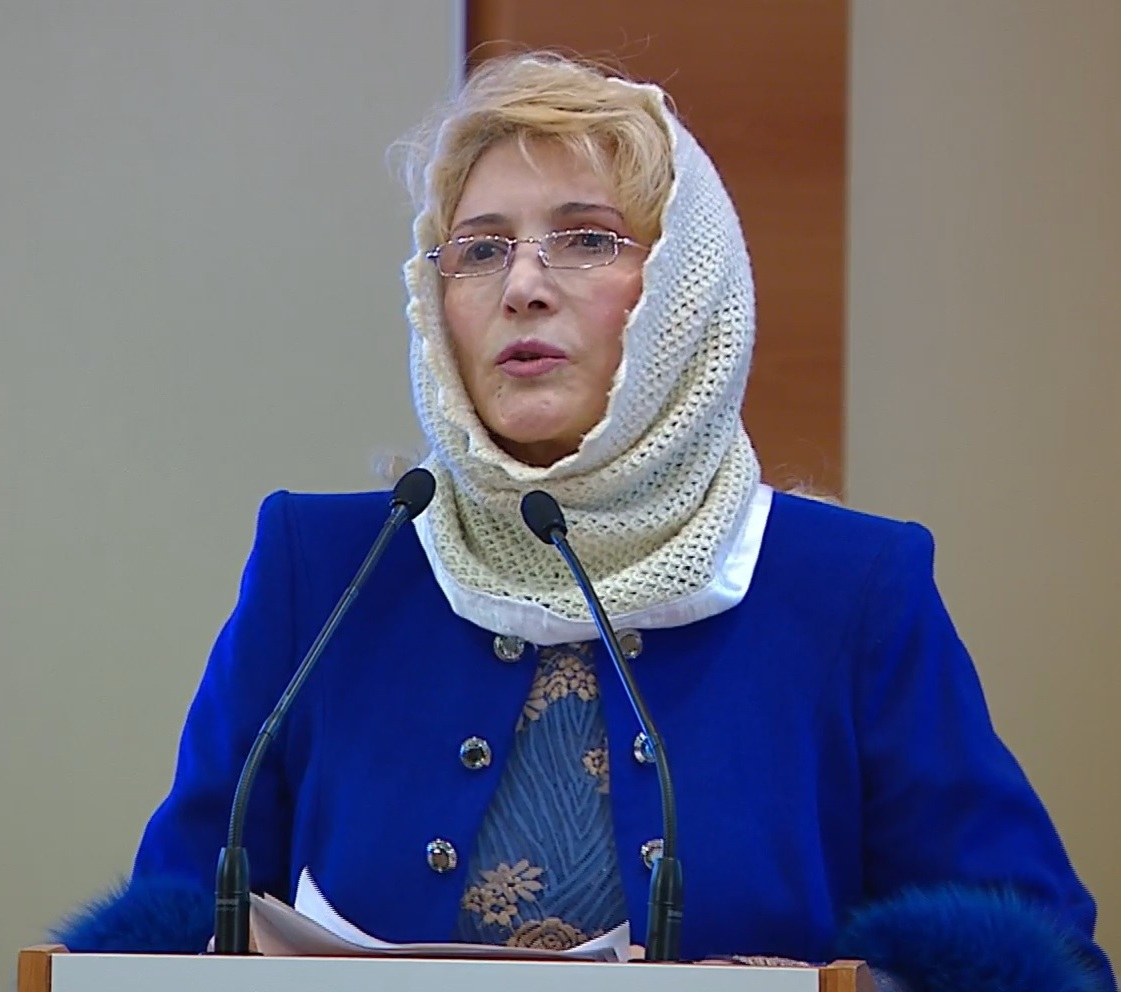
- Born: 3 August 1953 (age 72); Tashkensaz, Enbekshikazakh District, Alma-Ata Oblast, Kazakh SSR, Soviet Union
- Awards: Order of the October Revolution Order of the Badge of Honour

Sazhi Zayndinovna Umalatova (Russian: Сажи Зайндиновна Умалатова; born 3 August 1953) is a Russian politician, known for her Soviet legitimist activism, who claims to be the Chairwoman of the "Permanent Presidium of the Congress of People's Deputies of the USSR" since 1992.

== Biography ==
Sazhi Umalatova was born in 1953 in Kazakhstan, where her Chechen parents were deported in 1944. In 1957, she moved with her family to Grozny. She began her career in oil industry in 1969 at the Krasny Molot machine-building plant in Grozny; worked as a saturator, electric welder. In 1973, she was elected to the Grozny city council. Member of CPSU from 1978. In 1984, Umalatova was elected deputy of the 11th Supreme Soviet of the USSR. In March 1989, she was elected a People's Deputy of the Union. Soviet media of those years named her among the active participants of the I Congress of People's Deputies. On the 4th Congress in December 1990, she called for Mikhail Gorbachev to resign. She resigned from the Communist Party of the Soviet Union in 1991.

On 17 March 1992, she was elected chairman of the "Permanent Presidium" of the Congress of People's Deputies of the USSR at a self-proclaimed "6th Extraordinary Congress" attended by less than 10% of the total number of deputies. Unlike other bodies claiming the status of legal heirs to the Soviet government, the Permanent Presidium practically did not engage in lawmaking, focusing on awards and honorary titles related to the dismantled Union. In 1999, CPRF Perm Oblast branch was accused in cooperating with Umalatova's Presidium in selling illegal medals.

She is the leader of the Party of Peace and Unity, which she founded in 1996. Party of Peace and Unity and Umalatova personally were mentioned in the final report on the investigation into the fraud associated with the UN Oil-for-Food Programme, as she allegedly participated in exporting oil from Saddam's Iraq, bypassing UN sanctions.

== See also ==
- Neo-Sovietism
- Union of Slavic Forces of Russia
