= Vladimir Kvachkov =

Russian colonel (born 1948)

- Владимир Васильевич Квачков
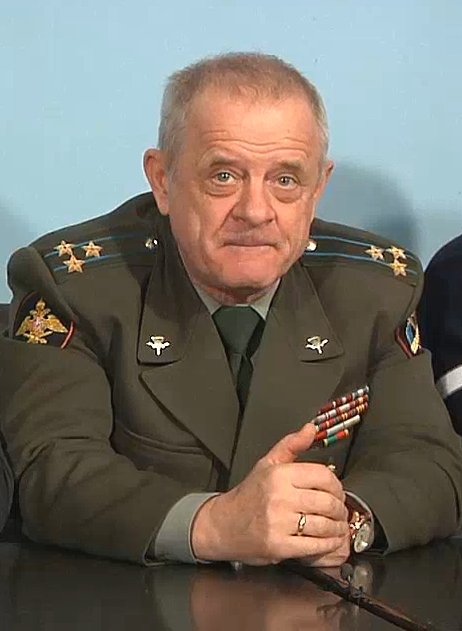
- Kvachkov in 2010
- Born: 5 August 1948 (age 78); Kraskino, Russian SFSR, Soviet Union
- Alma mater: Frunze Military Academy
- Spouse: Nadezhda Kvachkova
- Children: Anna Kvachkova; Elena Kvachkova; Alexander Kvachkov; Kirill Kvachkov
- Military career
- Rank: Colonel
- Units: Spetsnaz GRU; Group of Soviet Forces in Germany
- Conflicts: Soviet–Afghan War; First Nagorno-Karabakh War; Tajikistani Civil War
- Vladimir Kvachkov's voice Kvachkov's speech against Russian military reform Recorded on 7 November 2010

Vladimir Vasilievich Kvachkov (Russian: Владимир Васильевич Квачков; born 5 August 1948) is a Russian former Spetsnaz colonel and military intelligence officer, known for being arrested and charged for the attempted assassination of politician Anatoly Chubais in 2005, for which he was jailed for three years until he was acquitted on 5 June 2008.

== Early years ==
Vladimir Vasilievich Kvachkov was born on 5 August 1948, Kraskino, Primorsky Krai, Russian SFSR, the son of a military officer, and spent his childhood as a military brat in the town of Ussuriysk, where his father was transferred. Kvachkov graduated from Suvorov Military School in 1966 and the Higher Military School in Kiev, Ukrainian SSR in 1970. Kvachkov started his military service as a commander of a Spetsnaz platoon stationed in Pskov, and later served in the Group of Soviet Forces in Germany and Transbaikal Military District. In 1978, Kvachkov enrolled at the Frunze Military Academy and honourably graduated it in 1981. He had studied within the same group as Pavel Popovskikh, a military officer later charged and acquitted by court with the contract killing of journalist Dmitry Kholodov.

Col. Kvachkov's ribbon chart:
click on the ribbon bar to see the award

== Military career in GRU ==
In 1981, shortly after his graduation from the military academy, Kvachkov began serving in Leningrad Military District. In 1983, he was transferred to Afghanistan to lead a brigade of Spetsnaz GRU during the Soviet–Afghan War, where he became shell-shocked and had to undergo medical treatment.

From 1984 to 1986, Kvachkov served in Pskov, and from 1986 to 1989 he was the Chief of the Staff of a brigade in the Group of Soviet Forces in Germany. In 1989, Kvachkov became the commander of the 15th GRU Spetsnaz brigade located in the Turkestan Military District, and took part in military conflicts in Azerbaijan during the First Nagorno-Karabakh War in 1990, and in the Tajikistani Civil War in 1992. Kvachkov later served as a military consultant for the movie Black Shark, devoted to Black Shark helicopter pilots and Spetznaz GRU, where he also played a role as a Spetznaz colonel in the film.

In 1997 Kvachkov and Pavel Popovskikh (at that time the Chief of Military Intelligence of the Russian Airborne Troops) organized the scientific conference Special Operations and the Need to create the Special Forces branch of the Russian Army. Kvachkov and Popovskikh advocated making Spetsnaz groups an arm of service of the Armed Forces of the Russian Federation. The reform they proposed was not accepted.

== Post-retirement life ==
In 1998, Kvachkov retired from the active military service with the rank of colonel. He started to work as a senior research fellow with the Center for Military and Strategic Research of Russian Defense Ministry, working on the theory and practice of modern guerrilla warfare. The same year he received the Candidate of sciences degree (equivalent to PhD) for his dissertation Development of means and methods of special intelligence in the modern warfare. In 2005, he prepared a doctoral dissertation, with emphasis on special forces.

Rossiyskaya Gazeta asserts that during the 1999 NATO bombing of the Federal Republic of Yugoslavia Kvachkov presented Slobodan Milošević with his plan of an "alternative war". Milošević praised the plan but decided not to escalate the conflict. Rossiyskaya Gazeta also asserted that Kvachkov was the author of the plan to mine the corridor which Chechen fighters led by Shamil Basayev used to break from the siege of Grozny during the Second Chechen War.

== Assassination attempt ==
On 17 March 2005, Anatoly Chubais, head of the state run monopoly RAO UES and a major privatization economic reformer, narrowly escaped an ambush outside Moscow when his convoy was blasted with roadside bombs and trapped under automatic gunfire. The armored car carrying Chubais was damaged by a remotely controlled improvised explosive device, but was able to continue moving without stopping while the second car carrying bodyguards was shot upon. Allegedly the assailants left the scene in the green Saab car. Police investigators traced the green Saab reported at the scene, which turned out to be Kvachkov's wife car. The prosecution insisted not to divulge details of the case.

=== Arrest ===
Soon Kvachkov and two other former Spetznaz troopers, Alexander Naydenov and Robert Yashin were detained under suspicion of involvement into the assassination. The Meshchansky District Court of Moscow approved ten-days-arrest for Kvachkov. Investigators did not have any direct evidence or indicating his guilt, but indirect evidence allowed the court to issue the warrant. Igor Yartykh, a lawyer who won a case involving former paratroopers accused of the murder of Dmitry Kholodov, took Kvachkov's defense. According to the version of the investigators, Vladimir Kvachkov, Naydenov and Yashin as well as Vladimir Kvachkov's son, Alexander Kvachkov and Ivan Mironov, son of former Minister for Media and Information, Boris Mironov conspired to assassinate Chubais. The version was mostly based on the words of a single witness, Igor Karvatko.

On 19 March 2005, Kvachkov, who was a specialist in explosives, was arrested as a suspect in the Chubais assassination attempt.^{[d]} While the first search of Kvachkov's home discovered nothing crime related, the second search found firecrackers in Kvachkov's dacha. Kvachkov denied his involvement and refused to help the investigation. On 25 March 2005, Russian prosecutors formally charged Kvachkov with the assassination attempt.

== First trial ==
Court hearings began in spring 2006. The accused maintained that the assassination was staged by Chubais himself. In November–December 2006 Karvatko changed his testimony accusing the investigators in undue pressure and threats. He said that he was abducted by police soon after assassination attempt and tortured. He agreed to slander defendants after his kidnappers threatened to imprison his wife and showed him a forged protocol of the search in his apartment illegal ammunition and narcotics had been found. He provided audio recordings of some of his conversations with militia officers pressuring him, but the judge refused to make an examination of this tape and to file it to the case. Right away after that Karvatko's statement the jury panel was dismissed at the request of the prosecutor who stated the jury could no longer remain unbiased when they heard how Karvatko's testimony had been obtained. Only the initial of Karvatko's testimonies had been considered valid by court. While the lawyers of the plaintiff insisted that Karvatko was pressured by the suspects and their friends, Tatiana Mironova, mother of another suspect, Ivan Mironov, publicly accused investigators in torturing Karvatko. In December 2006 the court was restarted with the a new jury. As of December 2007, jury had been dismissed again, and hearings continued with the third jury. Pro-Kremlin liberal media pleaded for "tough sentences," to cool "folk avengers" and finally, after three years of imprisonment Kvachkov, Naydenov and Yashin were acquitted by the court on 5 June 2008. After the acquittal of Kvachkov, Chubais made statement saying that he has no doubts that Kvachkov was responsible for the assassination, and that it was Kvachkov who personally tried to shoot him in March 2005. On the other hand, he believes that acquittal of the guilty is better than sentencing of innocent Kvachkov, in retaliation, called the attack on Chubais the "first act of armed resistance in the national liberation war", Around the same time, Kvachkov said "now I have a chance to finish what I started", meaning his doctoral thesis, but some media quoted it out of context. Still he maintained that he did not participate in the assassination and that it was staged by Chubais himself to divert attention from his business problems The case returned to court again after the prosecution's appeal. The new trial started on 29 September 2008. The next court session was postponed until 13 October because only 6 out of 500 potential jurors arrived to court on the day the jury selection was scheduled to begin. On 13 October 2008 the case was sent by court back to the prosecution after the judge received Kvachkov's case and Ivan Mironov's case as two separate cases. The judge sent both cases back to the prosecutor so that they could be merged into one case. The trial on a new merged case began on 23 November 2009. On 21 August 2010 the jury found that there was not enough evidence presented in the persecutor case and all the defendants were acquitted again.

== The Crossbow Coup ==
On 22 December 2009, The Supreme Court rejected the prosecutor's appeal and confirmed the jury's verdict. The next day, Kvachkov's apartment was raided by FSB and he was arrested again on charges of raising an insurrection using crossbows. Such cases are processed without jury and secretly, so some media have speculated that the new sentence may not be as successful for the defendant as the first one. Chubais claimed that the new charges are very serious and that Kvachkov is insane.

The Moscow City Court approved the arrest. Kvachkov's lawyer Andrei Pershin said via the phone that he believed that the arrest of his client was Chubais's revenge. "Considering the fact that he was already in pretrial detention, we expected this to happen," Pershin said about the court decision to keep Kvachkov in pretrial detention for two months. He also stated that the defense planned to appeal to the European Court of Human Rights. The charges were linked to the activities of the group of Kvachkov supporters, the People's Front for Liberation of Russia, whose members in Tolyatti were accused of training with crossbows in a plot to overthrow the government. Thus, Kvachkov faced literally decades behind bars on charges of assisting terrorists and planning an armed uprising. Terrorism-related charges also meant he could not be tried by jury that time, which implied that there was a greater possibility of a guilty verdict.

On February 8, 2013, the Moscow City Court sentenced Vladimir Kvachkov to 13 years in a strict regime colony for preparing an armed mutiny. The second defendant, Alexander Kiselev, was sentenced to 11 years in a strict regime. The verdict says that it was established that in 2009 Kvachkov offered his supporters in various cities to take part in an armed rebellion, which was supposed to begin on June 24, 2010. His trusted man, Manrik, picked people up and they underwent military training at the training ground in Myakinino. In 2010, Kiselev in St. Petersburg picked up a group of ten people and acquired weapons. Kvachkov and his supporters were going to start a mutiny in Kovrov. It was planned to seize the buildings of the Kovrov branches of MVD, the FSB, the MChS, as well as weapons and ammunition in small groups. The success of the armed mutiny in Kovrov was supposed to provoke similar events in other regions, according to their plans. One of the main pieces of evidence in the case was the recording of a conversation between several supporters of Kvachkov, when they were developing a plan for a sortie into Kovrov, intelligence, distribution of funds and human resources.

Subsequently, the prison term was reduced to 8 years and in 2019 Kvachkov was released.

== Political activity ==
=== 2005 Duma elections ===
On 4 December 2005, Kvachkov, while in prison, took 30% and won the second place in the by-elections of the State Duma deputies in the North-East of Moscow.

Kvachkov was adamant to entreats of his supporters to run for the Duma mandate, which would set him free (elected representatives receive immunity from legal prosecution of any kind, criminal or civil). Kvachkov thought that it would make him look guilty. He continuously insisted that there was no wrongdoing in his actions, even if it was he who stood behind the assassination master plan, so he should not look for a way to avoid jail time. However, a group of major nationalist groups nominated Kvachkov for the race without even asking his permission.

Preliminary figures put Kvachkov's vote at 29 percent, quite an astonishing outcome. But eventually, he lost race to Sergei Shavrin, a former Federal Security Service officer. In the Preobrazhensky district in eastern Moscow, Shavrin, garnered 36.24 percent of the vote ahead of runner-up Vladimir Kvachkov with 28.91 percent. Kvachkov, received every third vote in the district, despite that he was only known to the public because of his alleged involvement in Chubais' murder attempt.

=== 2006 Duma elections ===
On 12 March 2006, Kvachkov stood for the State Duma again, now in the Medvedkovo district of Moscow. Andrey Savelyev from the Rodina faction announced that "Rodina members canvass Kvachkov's candidature in earnest," However, Rodina's leader Vladimir Rogozin refuted the statement nearly at once. Kvachkov said he had never considered the chances of taking part in elections until 8 September 2005. There was a reason, however, why Kvachkov didn't rush to elections: Taking part in them could be interpreted as indirect acknowledgment of guilt, Kvachkov pointed out, having good grounds for the supposition. Andrey Trapeznikov, member of the RAO UES board, said "Should Kvachkov agree to be nominated, it would be an illustrative indicator that he feels his guilt and tries to avoid responsibility by using deputy's credentials"

Kvachkov was not registered as a candidate by the regional Electoral Commission. Protesting this decision, Kvachkov's devoted sidekicks Naydenov and Yashin went on hunger strike in their prison. By the beginning of the elections, detention term for Kvachkov as well as for his alleged accomplices had been extended until 18 December, to pitch him out from the race. Another applicant for the elections, Communist Party member Yelena Lukyanova, a law professor at Moscow State University and the daughter of top-ranked Soviet apparatchik Anatoly Lukyanov, withdrew from the race, even though Rodina and the Union of Right Forces had considered backing her bid. Lukyanova said that she decided to leave the race because she believed it would be unfair. "I withdrew because I cannot take part in an election where a candidate does not enjoy the same rights I do," she said, referring to Kvachkov, who was in jail, left without any options to support his own candidature.

Both times, in 2005 and 2006, the Moscow branch of Labour Russia and Vanguard of Red Youth helped Kvachkov with his election campaign.

=== Position on the Russo-Ukrainian war ===
Vladimir Kvachkov has strongly supported the Russian invasion of Ukraine, but criticized Russian military for insufficient successes and called for the general mobilization of Russian population. In August 2023, he was fined 40 thousand rubles for “discrediting the army,” and in October he was placed under administrative supervision and banned from participating in rallies for five years.

== Publications ==
- Спецназ России (Russian Spetznaz), 2004, ISBN 978-5-93165-186-6
- Спецназ. 55 лет соединениям и частям специального назначения Вооруженных Сил Российской Федерации (Spetznaz. 55 years of Special Operations Forces of Russian Federation), 2005, ISBN 5-366-00002-5
- Опасен Верностью России (Dangerous By His Faithfulness To Russia), 2006 ISBN 5-9265-0231-4
- "Special Operations: Basic Types and Forms." Military Thought. 9(5): 70.

== Honours and awards ==
=== Soviet Union ===
- Order of the Red Star
- Medal "Veteran of the Armed Forces of the USSR"
- Jubilee Medal "50 Years of the Armed Forces of the USSR"
- Jubilee Medal "60 Years of the Armed Forces of the USSR"
- Jubilee Medal "70 Years of the Armed Forces of the USSR"
- Medal "For Impeccable Service", 1st, 2nd and 3rd classes

=== Russian Federation ===
- Two Orders of Courage
- Jubilee Medal "300 Years of the Russian Navy"

== Trivia ==
Kvachkov's cell mate at the Matrosskaya Tishina detention facility was former business oligarch Mikhail Khodorkovsky. According to Kvachkov Khodorkovsky is an exception among the oligarchs: "I have not found him intriguing against the state", said Kvachkov.

Khodorkovsky also planned to participate in the Duma byelections for the same seat as Kvachkov. His plan was based on the legal loophole: a convicted felon cannot vote or stand for a parliament, but if his case is lodged with the Court of Appeal he still has all the electoral rights. Unexpectedly it took only a couple of weeks to process Khodorkovsky's appeal, invalidating any of his electoral plans until the end of his sentence.

== Footnotes ==
- ^{a} Kvachkov′s Doctoral thesis in military science has been already written and submitted to the General Staff Academy, but due to some certain circumstances, particularly to the current imprisonment, he is not allowed to defend doctoral degree, so the degree process is temporarily suspended.
- ^{b} As he later commented his unwillingness to either admit or deny his involvement, was motivated by the concern, that court trial could be reopened "due to newly surfaced facts", in spite of the fact that he's already acquitted, and the acquittal itself isn't immutable, and would be contested by Chubais lawyers in case if Kvachkov admits some information related to his role in the assassination attempt.
- ^{c} His exact words were: "Thou shalt not kill a man, but you must eliminate the enemy."
- ^{d} The defense insisted on changing the charge formal formula "Statesman assassination attempt" to "Assassination attempt", because latter isn't a capital offense, and de jure Chubais doesn't hold any State position and thus isn't a statesman. However, that objection was dismissed by the judge.
