= Far-right politics in Russia =

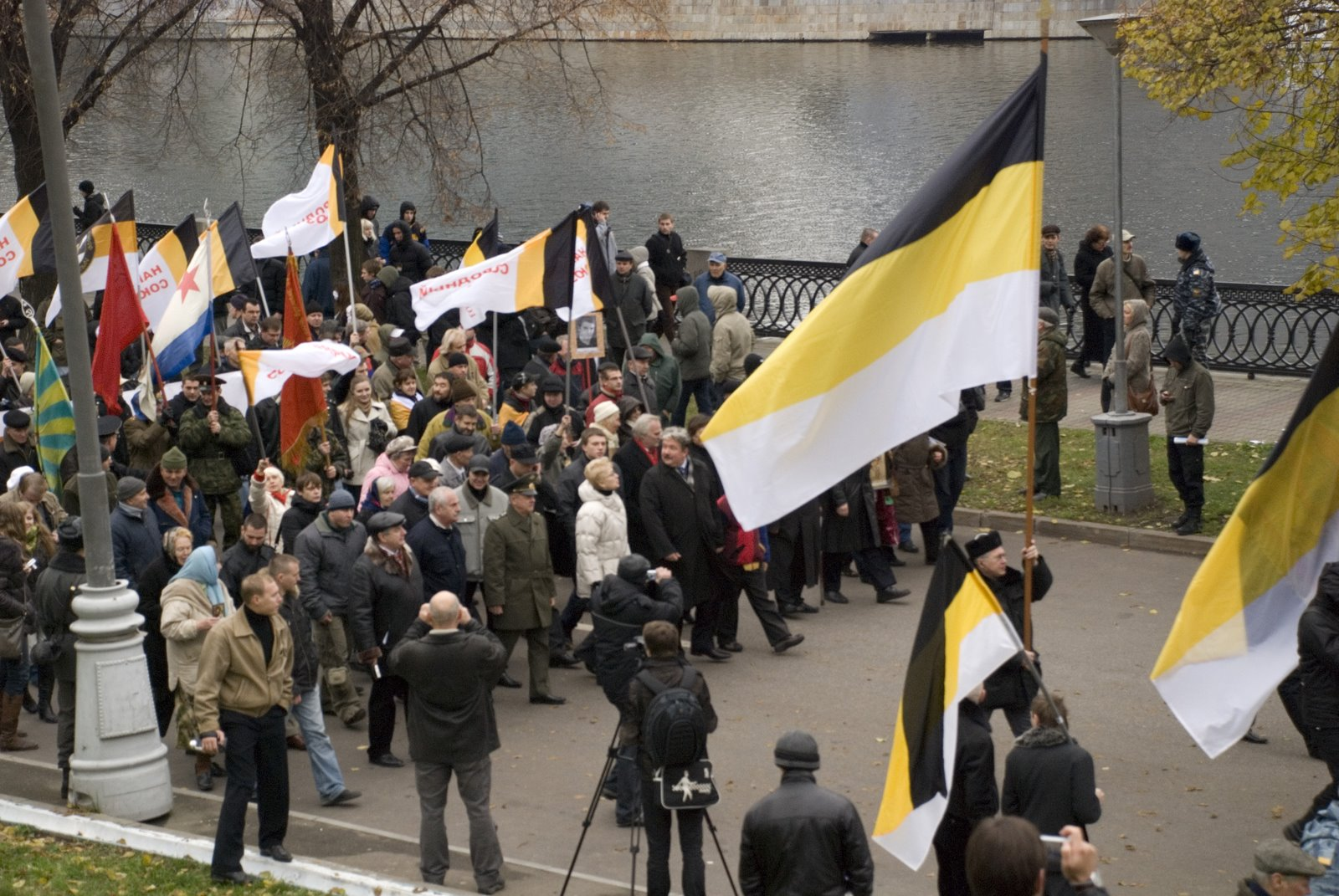
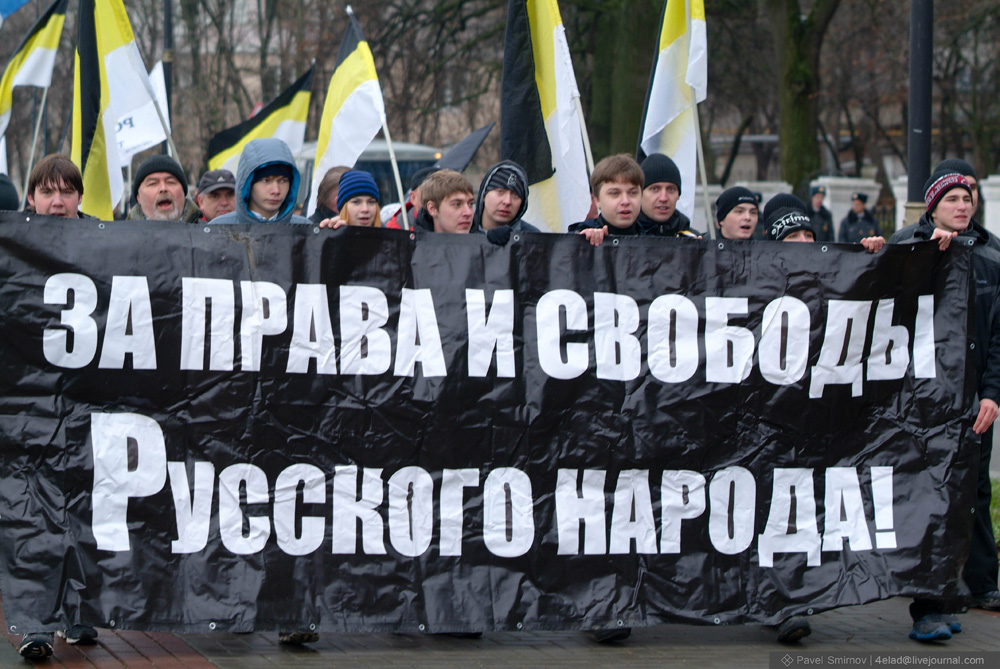
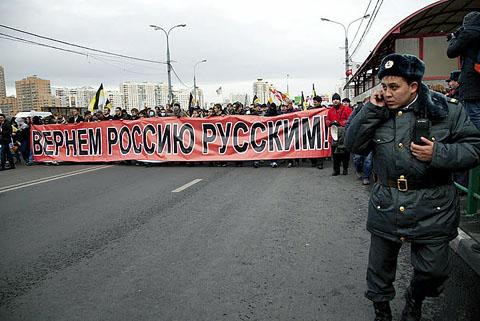
The black-yellow-white flag of the Russian Empire is commonly used among the far-right in Russia.

In contemporary Russia, the far-right scene spans a wide spectrum of political groups, authors, activists, political movements and intellectual circles. The mainstream radical right that is allowed or supported by the government to participate in official mass media and public life includes parties such as the Liberal Democratic Party of Russia (LDPR) and Rodina as well as political thinkers such as Aleksandr Dugin and Lev Gumilev. Other movements of Russia's far right include actors like the Movement Against Illegal Immigration and contemporary successors of the Pamyat organization.

Some of the main radical right-wing groups and figures in contemporary Russia had become active in politics before the dissolution of the Soviet Union. Alexander Dugin and Vladimir Zhirinovsky started their political career in the 1980s. Zhirinovsky's LDPR and Dugin's Eurasia Movement and Eurasian Youth Union and affiliated organizations remain fixtures in Russia's far-right scene and, since 1991, were joined by many other parties and networks.

Since the collapse of the Soviet Union, radical right-wing ideas have shaped Russia's political system, public discourse, domestic and foreign policies, and intellectual life.

== History ==
The ideology of the German Nazis regarded the Slavs in general as members of an "inferior race" and "subhuman", which during World War II resulted in an attempt to implement the "Generalplan Ost", which provided for the extermination, expulsion or enslavement of most or all of the Slavs in central and eastern Europe (Russians, Ukrainians, Poles and others).

=== Soviet period ===
The first reports of neo-Nazi organizations in the Soviet Union appeared in the second half of the 1950s. In some cases, participants were attracted primarily by the aesthetics of Nazism (rituals, parades, uniforms, the cult of the beautiful body, and architecture). Other organizations were more interested in the ideology of the Nazis, their program, and the figure of Adolf Hitler.

In 1970, a text titled Word of the Nation, signed by "Russian patriots" and later determined to have been written by A. M. Ivanov (Skuratov), one of the founders of the Russian neo-pagan movement and a supporter of the struggle against the so-called "Jewish Christianity", was distributed in samizdat in the USSR. It expressed rejection of the liberal-democratic ideas prevalent among some Russian nationalists at the time, and proclaimed as a program the ideas of a strong state and the formation of a new elite. To maintain order and combat crime, the program said, the authoritarian government should rely on "people's squads" (an analog of the Black Hundreds), which were not to be subject to any law. The author made demands against "infringement of the rights of the Russian people" and "Jewish monopoly in science and culture". He also argued against the "biological degeneration of the white race", which he said was a result of the spread of "democratic cosmopolitan ideas" and "accidental hybridization" of races, and called to remedy these problems by a "national revolution", after which "real Russians by blood and spirit" and others should become the ruling nation in the country. A full Russian version of this document was published in the émigré magazine Veche in 1981, where the author wrote about the possibility of the United States becoming "a tool to achieve world black supremacy" and argued that Russia has a special mission to save world civilization.

At the end of 1971, a text titled "Letter to Solzhenitsyn" signed by an individual named Ivan Samolvin was also circulated in samizdat. The "letter" talked about the ties of Jews and Freemasons, as well as a conspiracy to seize power over the world. The October Revolution is presented as the implementation of these secret plans. It is argued that the "true history" of the ancestors of the Russian people is being carefully hidden from the people. The letter was written by Valery Emelyanov, also one of the founders of Russian neo-paganism. These documents had a significant impact on the development of racism in Russia and neo-Nazism.

During the Soviet era, Viktor Bezverkhy (Ostromysl), the founder of the Russian Vedism movement (a branch of Slavic neo-paganism), revered Hitler and Himmler and in the narrow circle of his students propagated racial and anti-Semitic theories, calling for ridding humanity of "defective progeny" that allegedly resulted from interracial marriages. He called such "inferior people" "bastards", included "kikes, Indians or gypsies and mulattoes," and believed that they prevented society from achieving social justice. At the age of 51, he took an oath "to devote his life to the struggle against Judaism, the mortal enemy of mankind. The text of this oath, written in blood, was found on his person during a search in 1988. Bezverhij developed a theory of "Vedism," according to which, among other things: "all peoples will be sifted through the sieve of racial definition, the Aryans will be united, the Asian, African and Indian elements will be put in their place, and the mulattoes will be eliminated as unnecessary.».

The first public demonstrations by neo-Nazis in Russia took place in 1981 in Kurgan, and then in Yuzhnouralsk, Nizhny Tagil, Sverdlovsk, and Leningrad.

In 1982, on Hitler's birthday, a group of Moscow high school students held a Nazi demonstration on Pushkin Square.

=== Gorbachev years (1980s) ===
With the relaxation of Communist party control over public life during Mikhail Gorbachev's rule from 1985 to 1991, extreme right-wing groups began to openly organize, hold meetings and publish newspapers and journals. Their views had largely been formed before Gorbachev's perestroika. Their political and ideological frame of reference was the Black Hundreds movement which consisted of antisemitic and ultranationalist organizations and was best known for organizing Jewish pogroms in the Russian Empire during the early 20th century.

The best known far-right organization of the perestroika period was Pamyat. The group began its political activity in 1985, holding meetings and demonstrations at state premises and propagating its main idea that the global Jewish population had conspired against Russia. The group's leader Dmitri Vasilyev read aloud excerpts from The Protocols of the Elders of Zion, claiming that the course of history proved their authenticity. While many members of Pamyat adhered to Russian Orthodoxy and had sympathizers in the hierarchy of the Russian Orthodox Church, some members of the far-right rejected religion in favor of paganism. Pamyat's pagan branch centered around the figure of Valery Yemelyanov. He and other representatives of the Russian neo-pagan movement argued that Christianity has a negative influence because it was founded by Jesus – a Jew —, an idea echoing Nazi ideology. A 1987 book on paganism by Boris Rybakov which was published by the Academy of Sciences of the Soviet Union helped boost the development of politicized paganism with antisemitic overtones in Russia.

In 1987, several official magazines including Nash Sovremennik and Molodaya Gvardiya started publishing The Protocols of the Elders of Zion and other antisemitic literature by Russian writers the majority of whom did not belong to Pamyat but sympathized with the organization and expressed similar views. Russian authorities did not oppose the publishers and distributors of antisemitic and often purely fascist literature as the law enforcement and Communist party leadership reportedly had many sympathizers in their ranks. Representatives of the Leningrad City Communist Party Committee and police attended meetings of Pamyat from 1987 to 1988, where organizers called for a ban of marriages between Russians and non-Russians and for the deportation of all Jews. The adoption of the Soviet press law in 1990 which relaxed state censorship led to the proliferation of even more extreme publications that focused almost entirely on the Jewish question and published excerpts from works by Nazi ideologists. Several magazines including the monthly of the Defense ministry, Voenno-Istorichesky Zhurnal, published Mein Kampf.

=== Yeltsin years (1990s) ===
The far-right played an important role in Russian politics during Boris Yeltsin's presidency. The collapse of the Communist system in 1991 created new social and political circumstances that boosted the proliferation of far-right groups and ideas.

The disintegration of the Soviet Union led to migration flows across the borders of the newly created post-Soviet states. Far-right groups effectively exploited the resentment of the population of the Russian Federation towards forced migrants and refugees. Russian National Unity and its leader Alexander Barkashov agitated against people from the Caucasus and Central Asia and alleged that Russians would need to "defend" themselves against the newcomers.

The sense of national humiliation and injured imperial pride were a breeding ground for far-right views. Whereas the other Soviet successor states believed that they had gained something as a consequence of the Communist collapse, that is, their independence, Russians viewed the dissolution of the Soviet Union as a loss of an empire and their central place therein. As an expression of hurt imperial pride, the Vice President of Russia Alexander Rutskoy and other nationalists argued that the territorial borders of Russia are not the same as those of the Russian Federation and that Russians could not give up their claim to territories conquered since the 16th century that now lay beyond the borders of the Russian Federation. The idea that Russians should enjoy a special role on the territory of the former Soviet Union became a key element of Yeltsin's foreign policy.

In the 1990s, White power skinheads became a notable phenomenon among right-wing radicals of a neo-Nazi persuasion in Russia. Alexander Tarasov considers the breakdown of the education and upbringing system, as well as the economic recession and unemployment during the reforms of the 1990s to be the key reasons for the sharp growth of the skinhead movement in Russia. Tarasov writes that the First Chechen War further intensified dislike for natives of the Caucasus and contributed to the growth in the number of skinheads, which was further compounded by the government's imperialist rhetoric and weak prosecution of the extremist organizations by the police. According to Victor Shnirelman, the spread of racism and "Aryan identity" among skinheads in Russia was also influenced by anti-communist propaganda and criticism of internationalism during the "wild capitalism" of the 1990s, when social Darwinism and the "pursuit of heroism" promoted the popularity of images of "superhumans" and "the superior aristocratic race».

According to data from a participant observation conducted in 1996–2008 by lawyer and researcher S. V. Belikov, the first skinheads appeared in Moscow in the early 1990s, and their number was no more than a few dozen. In 1993–1994, the number of skinheads in Moscow reached 150–200 people, and the first skinhead groups started appearing in major Russian cities (St. Petersburg, Rostov, Volgograd, and Nizhny Novgorod) in the same years. In 1995–1996, the total number of skinheads in Russia exceeded 1,000, and their subculture and ideology became prominent among right-wing political extremists. In 1996–1998, there was a jump in numbers and organization: in 1998, there were about 20 organized associations in Moscow, there were printed publications, firms that satisfied the demand for skin paraphernalia, and skin music groups. In 1998–2000, increased attention from the police and society led to a decline in the skin-movement, which got rid of random people.

=== Putin years (2000s/present) ===
The years 2000–2004 saw a new upsurge, which ended in 2004 after the state intensified repressive and deterrent measures and a series of "show" trials Belikov estimates that in 2002 the approximate number of skinheads reached 5–7 thousand in Moscow and about 2 thousand in St. Petersburg. According to estimates by Alexander Tarasov and Semyon Charny in reports by the Moscow Bureau for Human Rights, as of 2004–2005 there were about 50,000 NS-skinheads in Russia (data sources and evaluation methodology are not cited). According to the SOVA Center, the number of victims of hate-motivated attacks at various times amounted to up to 700 people a year (the maximum values were recorded in 2008–2009), by 2015 this number had dropped to 80 people.

Experts attribute the cessation of growth in numbers and the decline in neo-Nazi activity both to increased resistance from law enforcement agencies and to the events in Ukraine (Euromaidan and the War in Donbas), which split the neo-Nazi movement and drove away some right-wing radicals. According to media reports, neo-Nazis from Russia take part in hostilities both on the side of the unrecognized Donetsk People's Republic and Luhansk People's Republic and on the side of the Armed Forces of Ukraine and pro-Ukrainian volunteer units. French sociologist and political scientist Marlene Laruelle reported on the participation of Russian National Unity members in the armed struggle on the side of the rebels. Sociologist Nikolai Mitrokhin notes that one of the units called Rusich consists of neo-Nazis from St. Petersburg and fights under a banner with a swastika stylized as a "black sun.

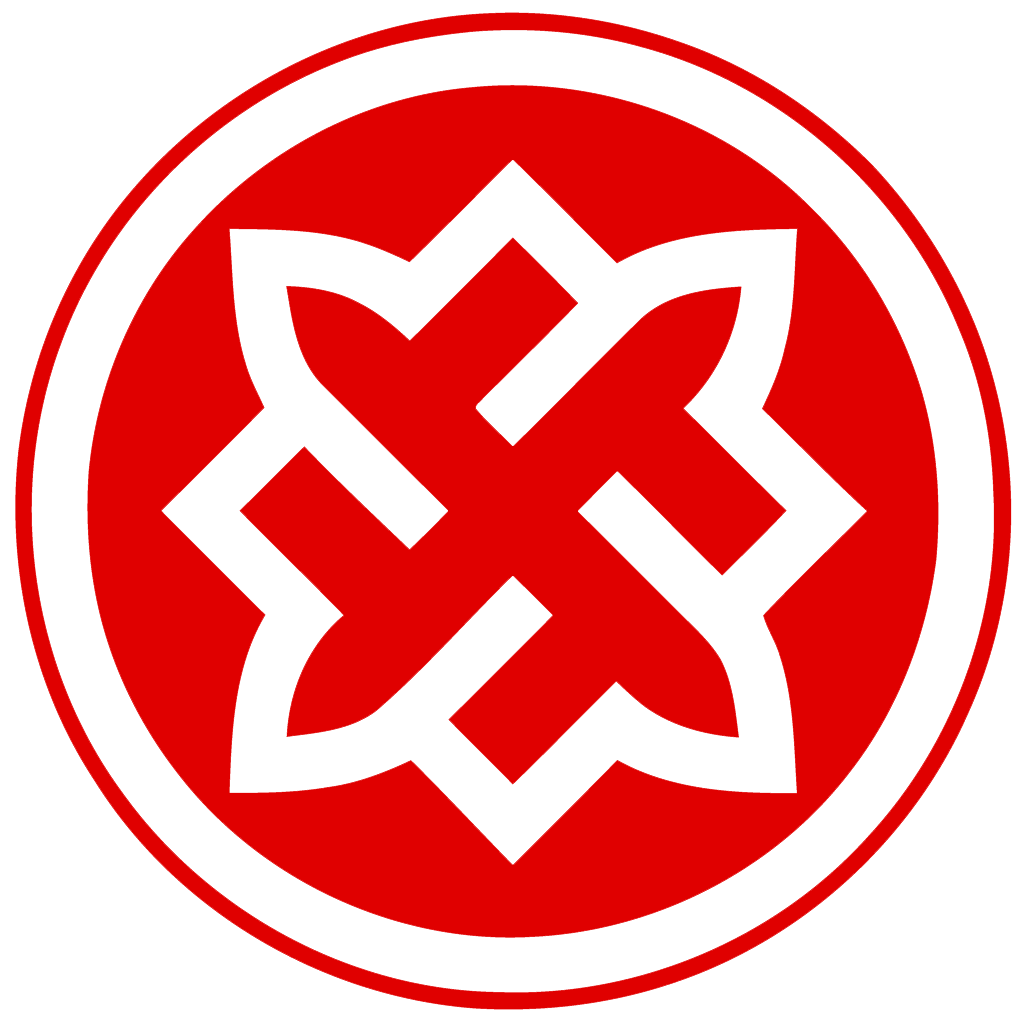
Swastika element in the logo of the neo-Nazi organization Russian National Unity

The following skinhead groups were among the radical wing neo-Nazi organizations that used terrorist methods of struggle: the Werewolf Legion (liquidated in 1996), Schultz-88 (liquidated in 2006), White Wolves (liquidated in 2008–2010), "New Order" (disbanded), Russian Target (defunct), and other groups.

In the mid-2000s, the future General Director of Roscosmos and Russian Federation Senator Dmitry Rogozin participated in ultranationalist rallies and was seen performing a Nazi salute in public.

The activities of neo-Nazi organizations and the use of Nazi symbols in Russia are prohibited by the Federal Law On Commemoration of Victory of the Soviet People in the Great Patriotic War of 1941–1945 and the Federal Law On Countering Extremist Activity.

At the United Nations, Russia introduced a Resolution on Combating the Heroization of Nazism in 2015 and 2016, which contained concerns about the glorification of the Nazi movement and the desecration or destruction of monuments to those who fought against Nazism during World War II. On 16 December 2020, a resolution was adopted by the UN General Assembly.

=== Ties to the Russian government ===
Since the 2004 Orange Revolution in Ukraine, the Russian government has been routinely accused of collaborating with neo-Nazis to fight domestic opposition to Vladimir Putin. This policy, known as managed nationalism, led to the increased prominence of the Russian Image group. Court documents at the trials of Russian Image leaders revealed that the organisation had connections to the Presidential Administration of Russia, that wanted "an organisation, dependent on the authorities, which could control the Russian far right".

Since the annexation of Crimea by the Russian Federation and the beginning of the Russo-Ukrainian War in 2014, connections between the Russian government and neo-Nazi groups have once again been noted in international news outlets. In particular, the Russian Imperial Movement have been noted for their large number of volunteers, including white supremacist militants from throughout Europe. Initially important in supporting Russian forces during the 2014–2022 War in Donbas, their relevance has decreased with the 2022 Russian invasion of Ukraine.

=== Opposition to Putin ===
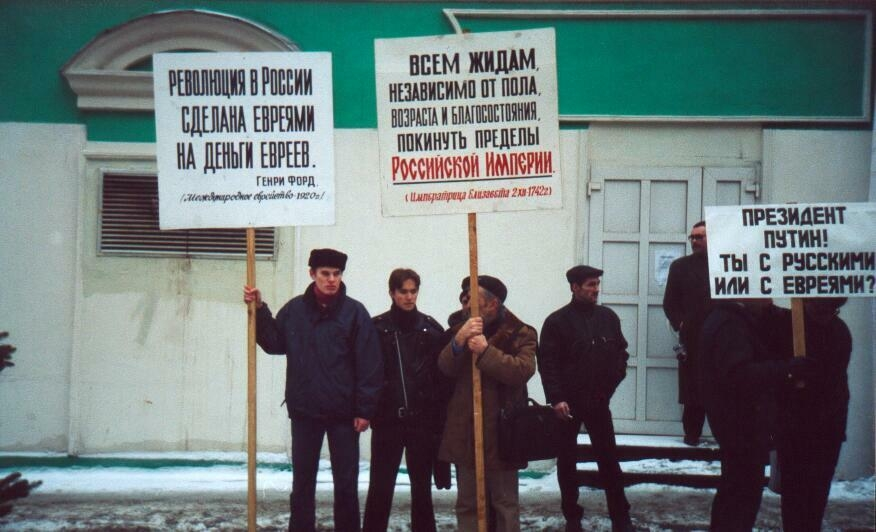
An antisemitic demonstration in Russia (2003), with posters claiming "president Putin is with the Jews".

The Guardian's report from Luke Harding noted that during the 2000s Neo-Nazis, Russian nationalists, and ultranationalist groups were the most significant opposition to Putin's government.

Prominent Russian liberal opposition figure Alexei Navalny said before his 2020 poisoning that the Kremlin was "far more afraid of ultra-nationalists than they were of him", noting that "[the ultranationalists] use the same imperial rhetoric as Putin does, but they can do it much better than him".

In 2022 and 2023 Political experts in Russia and in the United States have described the far-right ultranationalist opposition to Putin as possibly "the most serious challenge" to the Russian regime.

== Groups ==
=== Werewolf Legion ===
In 1994, a neo-Nazi group called the Werewolf Legion operated in Moscow, whose ideology was based on the basic tenets of German Nazism, including the struggle against "subhumans". Its members studied Hitler's Mein Kampf and prepared to fight Jews, communists and democrats. The group adhered to neo-pagan ideas, leaning toward the ideologemes of German neo-paganism. It existed for several months, and in the summer of 1994 was liquidated by the Moscow law enforcement.

=== Schultz-88 ===
In 2004, a trial was held against members of the neo-Nazi group Schultz-88, which operated in St. Petersburg and the Leningrad region from April 2001 to March 2003. Members of the group attacked people of "non-Slavic" appearance, Jews and representatives of youth subcultures hostile to skinheads. Members of the group included Alexey Voevodin and Dmitry Borovikov, leaders of the Mad Crowd skinhead group. The chief expert on the Schultz-88 case was the St. Petersburg scholar and ethnographer Nikolai Girenko. He was murdered on 19 June 2004. During the trial, the jury of the St. Petersburg City Court found members of the Borovikov-Voyevodin gang ("Combat Terrorist Organization") guilty, including in the murder of Girenko. On 14 June 2011 the St. Petersburg City Court sentenced the ringleader Voyevodin and another member of the group, Artyom Prokhorenko, to life imprisonment. Other members of the gang were sentenced to various terms of imprisonment.

=== Mad Crowd ===
On 14 December 2005, six members of the skinhead group Mad Crowd were sentenced to various terms of imprisonment for attacks on persons of "non-Slavic" appearance. The group operated in 2002–2003 in St. Petersburg and was led by Ruslan Melnik, Alexey Voevodin and Dmitry Borovikov. At the time of the trial, members of the group had formed a clandestine terrorist organization called the Combat Terrorist Organization (BTO). Borovikov died in 2006 from a fatal wound during an arrest and was buried with a neopagan funeral.

=== National Socialist Party of Russia ===
On 15 August 2007, a student was arrested for posting a video known as "Execution of a Tajik and a Dagestani" on the Internet. Against the background of the flag of Nazi Germany, skinheads organize the massacre of two Muslim illegal migrants. The National Socialist Party of Russia took responsibility for the massacre.

=== Saviour ===
On 15 May 2008, the Moscow City Court issued a guilty verdict in the 2006 Moscow market bombing. The attack took place on 21 August 2006. As a result, 14 people were killed, including two children, and 61 people were wounded. Among the dead were six citizens of Tajikistan, three citizens of Uzbekistan, a citizen of Belarus, a citizen of China, and two Russian citizens. All of the suspects were members of The Saviour, a neo-Nazi paramilitary group. The defendants were sentenced to terms ranging from two years to life imprisonment. Nikolai Korolyov, Ilya Tikhomirov, Oleg Kostarev and Sergey Klimuk were sentenced to life imprisonment.

=== White Society-88 ===
In 2008–2009 several members of the neo-Nazi group White Society-88 were detained, which had been operating in Nizhny Novgorod since 2008. Students Alexander Degtyarev and Artyom Surkov committed four murders and nine attempted murders of persons of "non-Slavic" appearance. Degtyarev was detained in December 2008 right after he shot and killed his teacher with a hunting smooth-bore gun. In June 2010, the Nizhny Novgorod Regional Court sentenced Alexander Degtyarev to life imprisonment, while Artyom Surkov and Maxim Alyoshin were sentenced to 10 and 9.5 years' imprisonment, respectively.

=== Ryno-Skachevsky gang ===
In 2008–2010, members of the Ryno-Skachevsky gang led by Artur Ryno and Pavel Skachevsky were convicted. Ryno claimed that since August 2006 he had killed 37 people of "non-Slavic" appearance, including about 20 with his buddy Skachevsky. In December 2008, students Artur Ryno and Pavel Skachevsky each received ten years in a minimum-security penal colony. Other members of the group were also sentenced to long terms of imprisonment.

=== BORN ===
Members of the neo-Nazi group Battle Organization of Russian Nationalists (BORN) were accused of a series of murders and attempted murders. In 2011, Nikita Tikhonov, one of the organization's leaders and founders, was sentenced to life imprisonment for the murders of lawyer Stanislav Markelov and journalist Anastasia Baburova, and his roommate Yevgenia Khasis received 18 years in prison. In April 2015, Maxim Baklagin and Vyacheslav Isayev were sentenced to life imprisonment, and Mikhail Volkov was sentenced to 24 years in prison. In July 2015, Ilya Goryachev, the group's founder, was sentenced to life imprisonment for organizing a gang, five murders, and arms trafficking. The sentencing of Ryno and Skachevsky was announced on 8 April 2010. Judge Eduard Chuvashov of the Moscow City Court, who handed down a verdict in this case, was murdered on 12 April 2010, by members of the BORN.

=== Volkssturm ===
In 2011, nine members of the "Volkssturm" skinhead group were sentenced. In 2013, one of the two convicted skinheads was Alexander Solovyov, one of the leaders of the group. In January 2014, the Investigative Committee of the Russian Federation reported that a 25-year-old member of the group, wanted since 2008, was detained in the Sverdlovsk region. The group operated in Yekaterinburg in 2006–2008. It was named after the units of the people's militia of Nazi Germany. It is proven, that the members of the group committed three murders and eight attempted murders of persons of 'non-Slavic' appearance and beat up 20 migrants. The skinheads documented their actions by filming them and posting them on the Internet.

=== Lincoln-88 ===
On 5 May 2011 Petersburg city court passed a guilty sentence on members of the skinhead group "Lincoln-88" that operated in St. Petersburg from August–December 2007. Andrei Linok involved more than 22 people in the group. Members of the group committed 12 attacks on persons of "non-Slavic" appearance, including two murders and one attempted murder. Eight attacks were videotaped and posted on the Internet. The court found 19 members of the group guilty, 10 defendants were sentenced to 4 to 9 years in prison, while the rest received suspended sentences of varying lengths of imprisonment.

=== NS/WP Nevograd ===
In June 2014, the neo-Nazi group NS/WP Nevograd was sentenced on charges of murder, an act of terrorism, incitement of hatred on racial and national grounds, and trafficking in weapons and ammunition.

=== The Cleaners ===
On 23 October 2017, the Moscow City Court sentenced members of the neo-Nazi group the Cleaners who killed more than 15 people between July 2014 and February 2015. Pavel Voitov was sentenced to life imprisonment, Elena Lobachova to 13 years and Maxim Pavlov to 9 years and 6 months in a penal colony. Vladislav Karatayev was sentenced to 16 years and Artur Nartsissov to 9 years and 6 months in a strict regime penal colony. As victims, members of the group chose citizens who, in their opinion, violate generally accepted norms of behavior: persons without a fixed place of residence, begging, abusing alcohol and being intoxicated.

=== Atomwaffen Division Russland ===
Atomwaffen Division Russland is a neo-Nazi terrorist group in Russia found by Russian officials to have been tied to multiple mass murder plots. AWDR was founded by former members of defunct National Socialist Society responsible for 27 murders and AWDR is connected to local chapter of the Order of Nine Angles responsible for rapes, ritual murders and drug trafficking. The Russian authorities raided an Atomwaffen compound in Ulan-Ude and uncovered illegal weapons and explosives.

=== Rusich Group ===
The Rusich Group, a small unit of several dozen people operating within Wagner Group's military organisation, in particular has notable Neo Nazi elements.

The group is referred to as a "sabotage and assault reconnaissance group", which has been fighting as part of the Russian separatist forces in Ukraine. Rusich are described as a far-right extremist or neo-Nazi unit, and their logo features a Slavic swastika. The group was founded by Alexey Milchakov and Yan Petrovsky in the summer of 2014, after graduating from a paramilitary training program run by the Russian Imperial Legion, the fighting arm of the Russian Imperial Movement. As of 2017, the Ukrainian Prosecutor General and the International Criminal Court (ICC) were investigating fighters of this unit for alleged war crimes committed in Ukraine. In June 2023, Wagner Group mutinied, but quickly stepped down.

=== Wagner Group (disputed) ===
The Wagner Group, a Russian mercenary group notable in the Russo-Ukrainian War has been accused of Neo-Nazism. However, Erica Gaston, a senior policy adviser at the UN University Centre for Policy Research, stated that the Wagner Group is not driven by ideology, but is rather a network of mercenaries "linked to the Russian security state".

=== Russian Volunteer Corpus ===
Russian Volunteer Corps is a far-right paramilitary unit of Russian citizens, based in Ukraine. It was formed in August 2022, during the Russian invasion of Ukraine, to fight against the government of Vladimir Putin. The group is headed by Denis Kapustin who is known as the owner of a neonazi merch store «WhiteRex», a sponsor of ultraright parties and organizer of football rioting in Europe. The group reportedly consists of Russian emigrants who are primarily united by their opposition to Putin. The group describe their ideology as conservatism, Russian nationalism and European nationalism.

== Ideology ==
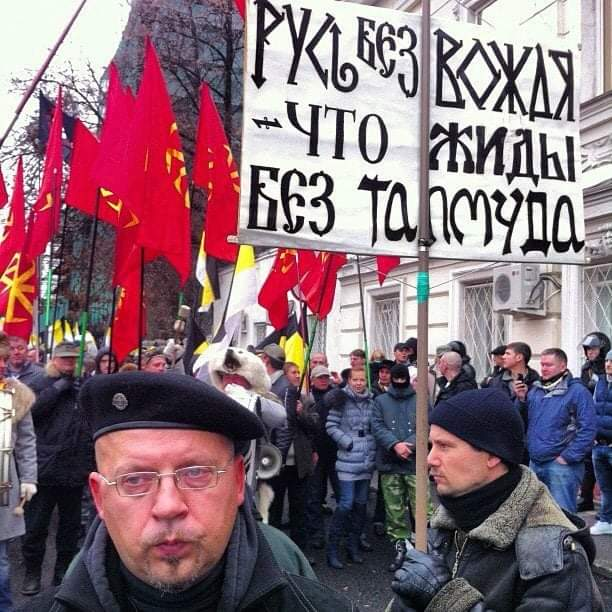
"Russian march" in 2012 in Moscow, poster against the background of flags with the nationalist and neo-pagan Kolovrat symbol

Like the old Nazism, Russian neo-Nazism combines ethnic nationalism, the idea of the Aryan race, its biological and cultural superiority over other races, the idea of racial antisemitism (the Semitic race is seen as the antipode and the main enemy of the "Aryan"), anti-communism and anti-democratism. The cult of Adolf Hitler is significant, and swastika, or its various modifications, remain the main symbols.

Until the late 1990s, one of the largest Russian nationalist-extremist parties was the neo-Nazi social-political movement Russian National Unity (RNE) of Alexander Barkashov, founded in 1990. In late 1999, RNE made an unsuccessful attempt to run for the State Duma. Barkashov viewed "true Orthodoxy" as a fusion of Christianity and paganism, advocating a "Russian God" and an allegedly related "Aryan swastika". He wrote about the Atlanteans, the Etruscans, the "Aryan" civilization as the direct predecessors of the Russian nation, their centuries-long struggle with the "Semites", the worldwide Jewish conspiracy, and the Jewish domination of Russia. The symbol of the movement was a modified swastika. Barkashov was a member of the "True Orthodox ("catacomb") Church", and the first cells of RNE were formed as fraternities and communities of the IPC.

The ideology of Russian neo-Nazism is closely related to the ideology of Rodnovery (Slavic neo-paganism). In some cases, there are also organizational ties between neo-Nazis and neo-pagans. Thus, one of the founders of Russian neo-paganism, the former dissident Alexey Dobrovolsky (pagan name – Dobroslav), believed in the ideas of National Socialism and he also transferred them to his neo-pagan doctrine. According to the historian, Dobrovolsky picked up the idea of the swastika from the work of Nazi ideologist Hermann Wirth (the first leader of Anenerbe). Dobrovolsky declared the eight-armed "kolovrat", consisting of two overlapping swastikas, considered in Slavic neo-paganism to be the ancient Slavic sign of the Sun, a symbol of an uncompromising "national liberation struggle" against the "Judean yoke". According to Dobrovolsky, the meaning of the "kolovrat" completely coincides with the meaning of the Nazi swastika.

A former Komsomol activist Ilya Lazarenko became one of the founders of the Union of Russian Youth. In 1992–1994, he was the head of the neo-Nazi youth movement which was called the "Front of National Revolutionary Action", that organization evolved from the Union, and it declared its allegiance to Orthodox Christianity. He published the newspapers Our March (1992–1993) and People's Construction (1993–1996). In March 1996, criminal proceedings were launched against Lazarenko and he was the first person to be convicted of inciting ethnic hatred. While he was under investigation, Lazarenko broke with the Orthodox faith and, founded the neo-Nazi Nav Society (also known as the "Holy Church of the White Race") in Moscow on Hitler's birthday in 1996. He did so under the ideological influence of the founder of esoteric neo-Nazism, Miguel Serrano In October 1994 Lazarenko became the leader of the youth neo-Nazi National Front party. The Navi Society was based on the worship of two supposedly Slavic gods, Yav and Nav, and practiced dress uniforms and rituals similar to Ku Klux Klan. The doctrine of the "church" was a combination of the ideas of Slavic neo-paganism with Indo-Aryan and Zoroastrian beliefs. Lazarenko identified "white people" exclusively with Russians. The main attribute of the movement's supporters were armbands with swastikas; others included Novgorod crosses (identical to Celtic crosses) with inscribed swastika, runic inscriptions, a ram's skull and Siegfried's sword. One of its goals was the extermination of people characterized by physical deformity. In 2005 Lazarenko repented and returned to the Orthodox Church.

Rodnovery is a popular religion among Russian white power skinheads. These skinheads, however, do not usually practice their religion.. During the trial for the skinhead organization Schultz-88 in the second half of 2005, the brochure "Paganism as the spiritual and moral basis of Russian national-socialism" by Dobrovolsky and the neo-pagan magazine The Wrath of Perun were mentioned. Members of the neo-Nazi group called the Combat Terrorist Organization of Nevograd (BTO), disbanded by the police in 2006, considered themselves Slavic Rodnovers. They published self-published magazines with a racist-neo-pagan orientation, where they developed the idea of creating a "new Nordic race". They called for a "pagan revolution", which they aimed to make closer by hunting on people of "non-Slavic appearance".

== Themes ==
An important theme of the Russian far-right has been so-called Russophobia. It is based on the belief that the Western world and internal groups driven by hatred for everything Russian have conspired and striven for centuries to harm Russia. A 1989 publication by Igor Shafarevich titled "Russophobia" garnered much attention. In the essay, he argued that the course of Russian history was characterized by the desire of "Little people" — here he singled out mostly Jewish members of the intelligentsia — to malign "Great People", that is, the majority of the Russian population.

== Art ==
In the 1990s, a number of neo-Nazi rock bands appeared in Russia. One of the most popular rock bands among skinheads is Kolovrat, founded in 1994. The band members share the ideas of the coming triumph of the "white world" and call for the "Aryans" to wage a race war. Other popular groups include Vandal and T. N. F. (Terror National Front), who record songs to the verses of the popular poet S. Yashin. Yashin, glorifying the "white race" and the "Aryan" idea. Similar groups exist in the regions – "Vantit" in Voronezh, "Faterland" in Samara, "Horst Wessel" and NS FRONT in Volgograd. Some of them adhere to the "Aryan style of music". The founder of the band DK Sergey Zharikov wrote about the unconditionally pagan character of rock culture, supported the national idea and messianism. Referring to the works of B. A. Rybakov, he argued that pagan ideology was most suitable for the struggle for the independence of the Russian land. Zharikov became the publisher of the neo-Nazi magazine Ataka, which focuses heavily on neo-pagan ideas. Such rock bands represent the Russian variety of a neo-Nazi music movement that developed in England and Germany from the early 1980s among the right-wing skinhead culture.

== See also ==
- Russia for Russians
- Russian irredentism
- Ruscism
- Nerus (political slur)
- Russian nationalism
- Ethnic nationalism in Russia
- Neo-Nazism in Russia

== Literature ==
- Агурский М. С. Неонацистская опасность в Советском Союзе // Новый Журнал. — Нью-Йорк, 1975. — Кн. 118: 199—204.
- Ксенофобия, национализм, фашизм: лики русского неонацизма. 2005.
- Новые религиозные культы, движения и организации в России : словарь-справочник. 1998.Новые религиозные культы, движения и организации в России : словарь-справочник. 1998.
- Современная религиозная жизнь России. Опыт систематического описания. 2006.Современная религиозная жизнь России. Опыт систематического описания. 2006.
- Новые религиозные организации России деструктивного, оккультного и неоязыческого характера. 2000.
- "Опыт сравнительного анализа текстов А. А. Добровольского и Г. Ф. Вирта (к вопросу об источниковой базе российских неоязычников)".
- Шнирельман, Виктор (2012). Русское родноверие : неоязычество и национализм в современной России. Litres. ISBN 9785457733121.
- Шнирельман, Виктор (2015). Арийский миф в современном мире. Новое литературное обозрение. ISBN 9785444804223.
- "Subcultures, pop music and politics: skinheads and "Nazi rock" in England and Germany". Oxford University Press. 2004.

External videos
- 1. From Russia With Hate // Current TV.
- 2. Hunted // Channel 4.

- Aitamurto, Kaarina (2018). "Родноверие, современное славянское язычество и сложности определения "религии"". Доклад, октябрь 2018 года, Второй Конгресс Русского религиоведческого общества «Понимание религии : исторические и современные аспекты». Archived from the original on 25 May 2021.
- Aitamurto, Kaarina (Aleksanteri Institute, University of Helsinki) (2007). "Russian Rodnoverie: Negotiating Individual Traditionalism". The 2007 International Conference. Globalization, Immigration, and Change in Religious Movements. June 7—9, 2007. Bordeaux, France. CESNUR. Archived from the original on 27 June 2021.
- Неонацизм в России//Передача радиостанции «Эхо Москвы» Архивная копия от 9 июня 2013 на Wayback Machine
