= Neo-Nazism in Russia =

External videos
- 1. From Russia With Hate // Current TV.
- 2. Hunted // Channel 4.

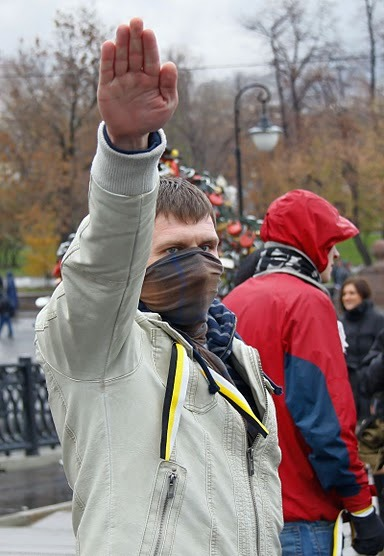
A participant in the rally against a pride parade on Bolotnaya Square in Moscow raising his hand in the Nazi salute (30 October 2010)

Neo-Nazism in Russia is a far-right political and militant movement in Russia. Emerging during the late Soviet era and early 1990s from white power skinheads and football hooligans, neo-Nazism in Russia has become known for a series of violent attacks and murders targeting Central Asian and Caucasian migrants. Videos of these attacks have been uploaded onto the internet by members of neo-Nazi or skinhead gangs, leading to international outcry and an eventual crackdown in the late 2000s and early 2010s.

Neo-Nazi organizations and the use of Nazi symbols in Russia are prohibited by federal law; however, with the beginning of the Russo-Ukrainian War, Russian neo-Nazis have achieved international attention for their militant support of Russian-backed separatist forces in eastern Ukraine. Certain groups, such as the Russian Imperial Movement, have been accused of training white supremacists and neo-Nazis from other countries in Europe. The links between these groups and the Russian government, comprising a policy known as managed nationalism, have become particularly noteworthy since the 2022 Russian invasion of Ukraine after Russian President Vladimir Putin claimed to be pursuing the "denazification" of Ukraine.

Neo-Nazi organizations and the use of Nazi symbols in Russia are prohibited by the Federal Law on Commemoration of Victory of the Soviet People in the Great Patriotic War of 1941-1945 and the Federal Law on Countering Extremist Activity.

== History ==
The ideology of Nazi Germany regarded the Slavs in general as members of an "inferior race" and "subhuman", which resulted in an attempt to implement Generalplan Ost during World War II, which provided for the extermination, expulsion, or enslavement of most or all of the Slavs in Central and Eastern Europe (mainly ethnic Poles, Belarusians, Czechs, Ukrainians, Serbs, and Russians).

=== Soviet period ===
The first reports of neo-Nazi organizations in the Soviet Union appeared in the second half of the 1950s. In some cases, participants were primarily attracted by the aesthetics of Nazism (rituals, parades, uniforms, the cult of the body, and architecture). Other organizations were more interested in the Nazi ideology and program and Adolf Hitler. In 1957, influenced by the Hungarian Revolution of 1956, neo-Nazi activist and dissident Alexey Dobrovolsky founded the Russian National Socialist Party, one of the first Russian neo-Nazi organizations, for which he was imprisoned. The emergence of neo-Nazism in the USSR continued in the 1960s and 1970s, during which such organizations still preferred to operate underground.

In 1970, a text entitled The Word of the Nation was circulated in samizdat in the Soviet Union. Signed by "Russian patriots" and later determined to have been written by A. M. Ivanov (Skuratov), one of the founders of the Russian Neo-pagan movement and a supporter of the struggle against the so-called "Jewish Christianity", it expressed rejection of the liberal democratic ideas then prevalent among some Russian nationalists, and proclaimed a new program based on the ideas of a strong state and the formation of a new elite. To maintain order and combat crime, the program said, the authoritarian government should rely on extrajudicial "people's militias" (analogous to the Black Hundreds). The author demanded a struggle against the "infringement of the rights of the Russian people" and the "Jewish monopoly in science and culture". He also argued against the "biological degeneration of the white race", which he said was due to the spread of "democratic cosmopolitan ideas" and "accidental hybridization" of races, and called for a "national revolution", after which "true Russians by blood and spirit" would become the ruling nation. The full Russian version of this document was published in the émigré magazine Veche in 1981, where the author wrote about the possibility of the United States turning into "an instrument for achieving global domination by the black race" and argued that Russia has a special mission to save global civilization.

In late 1971, a text entitled Letter to Solzhenitsyn, signed by a certain Ivan Samolvin, was also circulated in samizdat. The letter spoke of alleged Jewish ties to the Freemasons and a secret conspiracy to seize power over the world. The October Revolution was presented as the implementation of these secret plans. It was claimed that the "true history" of the ancestors of the Russian people was being carefully concealed from the public. The letter was written by Moscow-based Arabist Valery Yemelyanov. This document and The Word of the Nation had a significant impact on the development of Russian racism and neo-Nazism.

Modern Russian neopaganism emerged in the late 1970s and is associated with the anti-Semitic activities of Valery Yemelyanov and Alexey Dobrovolsky. However, not all currents of Russian neopaganism (Rodnovery) are associated with neo-Nazism.

During the Soviet era, Viktor Bezverkhy, the founder of Peterburgian Vedism (a branch of Slavic neo-paganism), openly revered Adolf Hitler and Heinrich Himmler and, among his close circle of disciples, promoted racial and anti-Semitic theories, calling for ridding humanity of "defective progeny" that allegedly resulted from interracial marriages. He called such "inferior people" "bastards" and included among them "Jews, Indians, Gypsies, and mulattoes," and believed that they hindered society in achieving social justice. At the age of 51, he swore an oath to "devote his entire life to the struggle against Judaism, the mortal enemy of humanity." The text of this oath, written in blood, was discovered during a search of his home in 1988. Bezverkhy's Vedism stated, among other things, that, "In the event of a fascist victory, all peoples will be sifted through the sieve of racial identification, the Aryans will be united, the Asian, African and Indian elements will be put in their proper place, and the mulattoes will be eliminated as unnecessary."

The first public neo-Nazi demonstrations in Russia took place in 1981 in Kurgan, in which over 100 high school students with swastika armbands took part. Among the slogans of the demonstration was "Fascism will save Russia." Other demonstrations took place in Yuzhnouralsk, Nizhny Tagil, Sverdlovsk, and Leningrad.

On 20 April 1982, Hitler's birthday, a group of Moscow students, numbering from somewhere between a dozen to nearly 100, held a neo-Nazi demonstration on Pushkin Square.

=== Post-Soviet period ===
In the 1990s, white power skinheads became a prominent phenomenon among neo-Nazis in Russia; Alexander Tarasov considers the key reasons for this to be the breakdown of the education system, as well as the economic recession and unemployment during the reforms of the 1990s. Tarasov wrote that the growth of the skinheads was also fueled by the First Chechen War, which heightened hostility toward people from the Caucasus, which was further compounded by the government's imperialist rhetoric and the insufficient efforts of law enforcement agencies to combat right-wing radical organizations. According to historian Viktor Shnirelman, the spread of racism and "Aryan identity" among skinheads in Russia was also influenced by anti-communist propaganda and criticism of internationalism during the "wild capitalism" of the 1990s, when social Darwinism and the "pursuit of heroism" contributed to the popularity of images of the "superman" and the "superior aristocratic race".

Starting in 1997, Russian skinheads received regular support from the European and American far right. A number of neo-Nazis and other white supremacists (including members of the Ku Klux Klan) from the United States, as well as members of the German People's Union, as well as the Wiking-Jugend (which was banned in Germany), took trips to Russia to and supplied Russian skinheads with neo-Nazi literature, audio cassettes, and uniforms. On 5 December 1998, skinheads and neo-Nazis marched through the city's historic center, chanting slogans such as "Russia for Russians, Moscow for Muscovites."

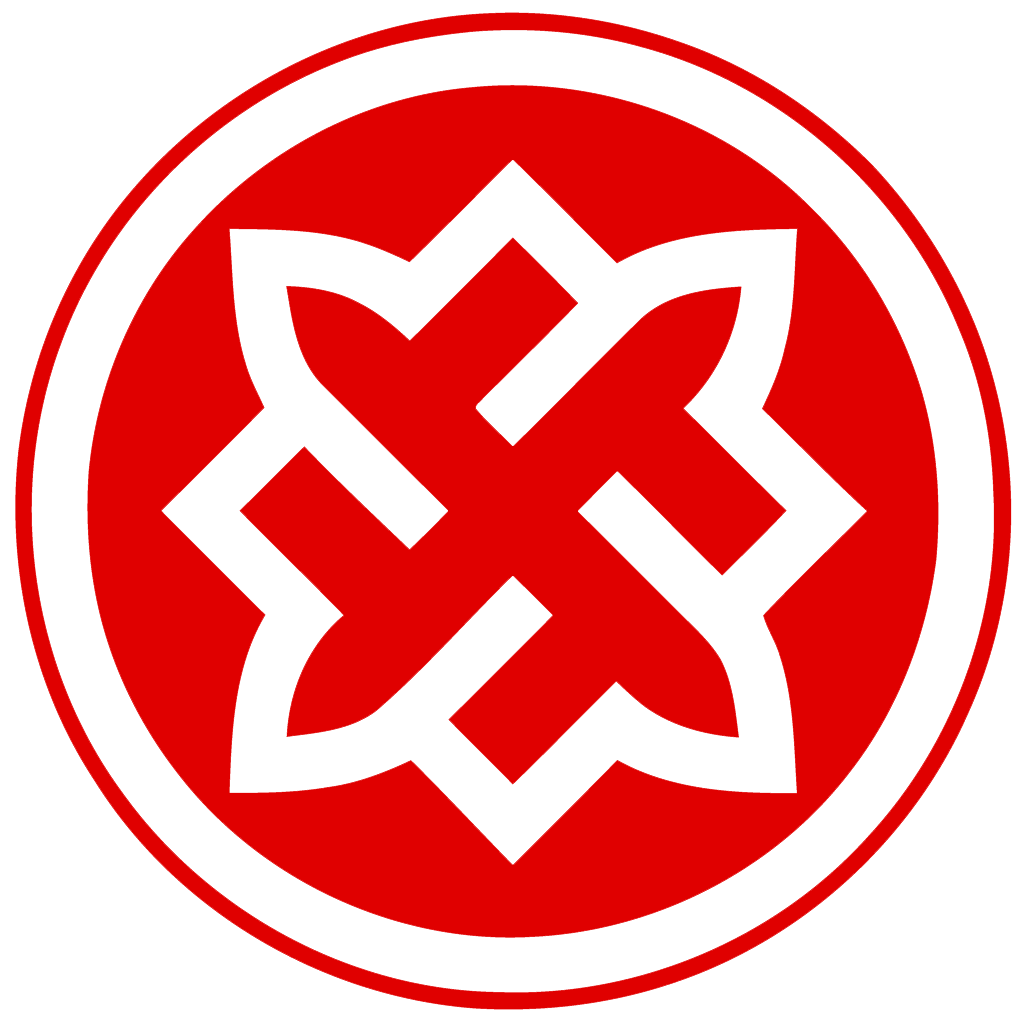
Swastika element in the logo of the neo-Nazi organization Russian National Unity

Some Russian neo-Nazi organizations are members of the World Union of National Socialists. As of 2012, six Russian organizations were officially registered members, including Russian National Unity and the Slavic Union (banned by a court decision in June 2010).

Among the neo-Nazi organizations that used terrorist methods were: the Werewolf Legion (liquidated in 1996), Schultz-88 (liquidated in 2006), White Wolves (liquidated in 2008-2010), New Order (disbanded), and Russian Goal (defunct).

On 15 August 2007, Russian authorities arrested a student for allegedly posting a video on the Internet which appears to show two migrant workers being beheaded in front of a red and black swastika flag. Alexander Verkhovsky, the head of a Moscow-based center that monitors hate crime in Russia, said, "It looks like this is the real thing. The killing is genuine ... There are similar videos from the Chechen war. But this is the first time the killing appears to have been done intentionally." The Ministry of Internal Affairs has a history of downplaying and denying neo-Nazi violence: A ministry representative called the beheading video a "fake". On November 4, 2025, a racially motivated murder took place in Moscow on the Russian Unity Day. The "National Socialist Organization for the Liberation of White Europe" took credit and posted a video of the murder. The Ministry again downplayed it and stated it was a conflict between teens.

=== Ties to the Russian government ===
Since the 2004 Orange Revolution in Ukraine, the Russian government has been routinely accused of collaborating with neo-Nazis in order to fight domestic opposition to Vladimir Putin. This policy, known as managed nationalism, led to the increased prominence of the Russian Image group until its collapse in 2009 after the arrest of its leaders for the murders of Stanislav Markelov and Anastasia Baburova. Court documents at the trials of Russian Image leaders revealed that the organisation had connections to the Presidential Administration of Russia, that wanted "an organisation, dependent on the authorities, which could control the Russian far right".

Since the annexation of Crimea by the Russian Federation and the beginning of the Russo-Ukrainian War in 2014, connections between the Russian government and neo-Nazi groups have once again been noted in international news outlets. In particular, the Russian Imperial Movement have been noted for their large number of volunteers, including white supremacist militants from throughout Europe. Initially important in supporting Russian forces during the 2014–2022 War in Donbas, their relevance has decreased with the 2022 Russian invasion of Ukraine.

==== Neo-Nazi militias ====
Neo-Nazis from Russia have participated in military operations on the side of the unrecognized Donetsk People's Republic and Luhansk People's Republic, as well as on the side of the Armed Forces of Ukraine and pro-Ukrainian volunteer units. Russian-Belarusian neo-Nazi activist Sergei Korotkikh took part in the fighting on the Ukrainian side. French sociologist and political scientist Marlène Laruelle reported on the participation of mercenaries "related, directly or indirectly, to the Russian National Unity movement" in the war on the side of the separatists. Sociologist Nikolai Mitrokhin notes that one unit, Rusich, is composed of neo-Nazis from Saint Petersburg and fights under a banner featuring a swastika stylized as a "kolovrat".

According to journalist Antonia Langford, writing for The Telegraph, Russian state militarization of the youth and narratives of external threats have been responsible for youth violence and school attacks against perceived outsiders. There were at least seven school attacks in the first two months of 2026, most prominently the Bashkir State Medical University attack, in which a teen neo-Nazi stabbed seven foreign students while shouting Nazi slogans and painting a swastika with the victims' blood. There is also a convergence with Russian militants fighting in Ukraine: the Rusich Group reportedly supported the 15-year-old white supremacist who stabbed a Tajik student to death in the 2025 Odintsovo school attack.

== Demographics ==
According to data from a participant observation conducted in 1996–2008 by lawyer and researcher S. V. Belikov, the first skinheads appeared in Moscow in the early 1990s and numbered no more than a few dozen. In 1993–1994, the number of skinheads in Moscow reached 150-200 and the first skinhead groups began to emerge in major Russian cities (St. Petersburg, Rostov-on-Don, Volgograd, Nizhny Novgorod, Novosibirsk, Yekaterinburg, and Krasnoyarsk). In 1995–1996, the total number of skinheads in Russia exceeded 1,000, and their subculture and ideology became prominent among right-wing political extremists. In 1996–1998, there was a surge in numbers and organization: in 1998, there were about 20 organized associations in Moscow, printed publications, firms supplied skinhead paraphernalia, and skinhead music band. In 1998–2000, increased attention from the police, the Federal Security Service, and society led to a decline in the skinhead movement. Between 2000 and 2004, there was a new upsurge, which ended by 2004 after the state intensified repressive and deterrent measures and a series of publicized trials Belikov estimated that in 2002, the approximate number of skinheads reached 5,000-7,000 in Moscow and about 2,000 in St. Petersburg. According to estimates cited by Alexander Tarasov and Semyon Charny in reports by the Moscow Bureau for Human Rights, there were approximately 50,000 neo-Nazi skinheads in Russia in 2004-2005 (data sources and evaluation methodology are not cited). By 2008, the membership of fascist skinhead groups in Russia was estimated at between 20,000 and 70,000 members. By 2008, the membership of fascist skinhead groups in Russia was estimated at between 20,000 and 70,000 members.

According to the SOVA Center, the number of victims of hate-motivated attacks in Russia amounted to up to 700 people a year (the highest figures being recorded in 2008–2009); by 2015, this number had decreased to 80 people.

Experts attribute the decline in the growth of neo-Nazi organizations in Russia to increased counteraction from law enforcement agencies as well events in Ukraine (Euromaidan and the war in Donbas), which have split the neo-Nazi movement.

== Groups ==
=== Werewolf Legion ===
In the spring of 1994, a neo-Nazi group called the Werewolf Legion was formed in Moscow. Shortly after its formation, the group allegedly attempted to set fire to the Olympic sports hall in Moscow, which was serving as the site of a Messianic Jewish conference. They were also reported to have planned arson attacks on movie theaters that were screening the film Schindler's List. Three members of the group were put on trial for charges of homicide, robbery, hooliganism and inciting racial hatred.

Two of the members received prison sentences by the Russian court, and the group was dismantled by Moscow law enforcement in July 1994.

=== Schultz-88 ===
In 2004, a trial was held against members of the neo-Nazi group Schultz-88, which operated in St. Petersburg and the Leningrad Oblast from April 2001 to March 2003. Members of the group committed attacks on individuals of "non-Slavic" appearance, Jews, and members of youth subcultures hostile to neo-Nazi skinheads. Among the group's members were Alexey Voyevodin and Dmitry Borovikov, leaders of the neo-Nazi skinhead group Mad Crowd. The chief expert witness in the Schultz-88 case was the St. Petersburg scholar and ethnographer Nikolai Girenko. He was murdered on 19 June 2004. During the trial, a jury of the St. Petersburg City Court found members of the Borovikov-Voyevodin gang (the Combat Terrorist Organization) guilty of, among other things, Girenko's murder. On 14 June 2011, the St. Petersburg City Court sentenced Voyevodin and another member, Artyom Prokhorenko, to life imprisonment. Other members of the gang were sentenced to varying terms of imprisonment.

=== Mad Crowd ===
On 14 December 2005, six members of the skinhead group Mad Crowd were sentenced to various terms of imprisonment for attacks on persons of "non-Slavic" appearance. The group operated in 2002–2003 in St. Petersburg and was led by Ruslan Melnik, Alexey Voevodin and Dmitry Borovikov. At the time of the trial, members of the group had formed a clandestine terrorist organization called the Combat Terrorist Organization (BTO). Borovikov died in 2006 from a fatal wound during an arrest and was buried with a neopagan funeral.

=== National Socialist Party of Rus' ===
On 15 August 2007, a student was arrested for posting a video online known as "The Execution of a Tajik and a Dagestani" on the Internet. In the video, against the backdrop of the flag of Nazi Germany, skinheads orchestrated the massacre of two Muslim illegal migrants. The National Socialist Party of Rus' claimed responsibility for the murders.

=== The Saviour ===
On 15 May 2008, the Moscow City Court delivered a guilty verdict for the 2006 Moscow market bombing. The terrorist attack took place on 21 August 2006. It killed 14 people, including two children, and injured 61 people. Among the dead were six Tajik citizens, three Uzbek citizens, a Belarusian citizen, a Chinese citizen, and two Russian citizens. All suspects were members of the neo-Nazi terrorist organization The Saviour. The defendants were sentenced to terms ranging from two years to life imprisonment. Nikolai Korolyov, Ilya Tikhomirov, Oleg Kostarev, and Sergei Klimuk were sentenced to life imprisonment.

=== White Society-88 ===
In 2008-2009, several members of the Nizhny Novgorod-based neo-Nazi group White Society-88, which was active since 2008, were detained. Students Alexander Degtyarev and Artyom Surkov committed four murders and nine attempted murders of individuals of "non-Slavic" appearance. Degtyarev was arrested in December 2008 immediately after shooting and killed his professor with a shotgun. In June 2010, the Nizhny Novgorod Oblast Court sentenced Alexander Degtyarev to life imprisonment, while Artyom Surkov and Maxim Alyoshin were sentenced to 10 and 9.5 years, respectively.

=== Ryno-Skachevsky gang ===
In 2008–2010, members of a neo-Nazi skinhead gang led by students Artur Ryno and Pavel Skachevsky were convicted. Ryno claimed that since August 2006, he had killed 37 individuals of "non-Slavic" appearance, including about 20 with his friend Skachevsky. In December 2008, Ryno and Skachevsky were each sentenced to ten years in a minimum-security penal colony. Other members of the gang also received lengthy prison terms.

=== Battle Organization of Russian Nationalists ===
Members of the neo-Nazi group Battle Organization of Russian Nationalists (BORN) have been accused of a series of murders and attempted murders, including the murders of Stanislav Markelov and Anastasia Baburova. In 2011, Nikita Tikhonov, one of the organization's leaders and founders, was sentenced to life imprisonment for the murders of lawyer Stanislav Markelov and journalist Anastasia Baburova, while his partner, Yevgenia Khasis, received 18 years in prison. In April 2015, Maxim Baklagin and Vyacheslav Isayev were sentenced to life imprisonment, and Mikhail Volkov was sentenced to 24 years. In July 2015, Ilya Goryachev, the group's founder, was sentenced to life imprisonment for organizing the gang, committing five murders, and arms trafficking. The verdict against Ryno and Skachevsky was announced on 8 April 2010. Moscow City Court Judge Eduard Chuvashov, who delivered the verdict in this case, was murdered on 12 April 2010 by members of BORN.

=== Volkssturm ===
In 2011, nine members of the Volkssturm skinhead gang were convicted. In 2013, one of two more skinheads convicted was Alexander Solovyov, one of the gang's leaders. In January 2014, the Investigative Committee Russia reported the arrest in the Sverdlovsk Oblast of a 25-year-old member of the gang, who had been wanted since 2008, was detained in the Sverdlovsk region. The gang operated in Yekaterinburg from 2006 to 2008. It was named after the Volkssturm, the national militia of Nazi Germany. It has been proven that the members of the gang committed three murders and eight attempted murders of individuals of "non-Slavic" appearance and beat 20 migrants. The members documented their actions by filming and posting them online.

=== Lincoln-88 ===
On 5 May 2011, the St. Petersburg City Court convicted members of the neo-Nazi skinhead gang Lincoln-88, which operated in St. Petersburg from August to December 2007. Andrei Linok recruited more than 22 people into the gang. The gang members committed 12 attacks on individuals of "non-Slavic" appearance, including two murders and one attempted murder. Eight of attacks were filmed and posted online. The court found 19 members guilty, 10 of whom were sentenced to prison terms ranging from 4 to 9 years, while the rest received suspended sentences of varying lengths.

=== NS/WP Nevograd ===
In June 2014, members of the neo-Nazi gang NS/WP Nevograd were convicted of murder, terrorism, incitement to hatred on racial and national grounds, and illegal trafficking of weapons and ammunition.

=== The Cleaners ===
On 23 October 2017, the Moscow City Court sentenced members of the neo-Nazi gang the Cleaners, who killed more than 15 people between July 2014 and February 2015. Pavel Voitov was sentenced to life imprisonment, Yelena Lobachova to 13 years, and Maxim Pavlov to 9 years and 6 months in a penal colony. Vladislav Karatayev was sentenced to 16 years and Artur Nartsissov to 9 years and 6 months in a maximum-security penal colony. The group targeted individuals they believed violated generally accepted norms of behavior: homeless individuals, beggars, alcohol abusers, and intoxicated individuals.

=== Atomwaffen Division Russland ===
Atomwaffen Division Russland is a neo-Nazi terrorist group in Russia found by Russian officials to have been tied to multiple mass murder plots. AWDR was founded by former members of defunct National Socialist Society responsible for 27 murders and AWDR is connected to local chapter of the Order of Nine Angles responsible for rapes, ritual murders and drug trafficking. The Russian authorities raided an Atomwaffen compound in Ulan-Ude and uncovered illegal weapons and explosives.

=== Rusich Group ===
The Rusich Group, a unit operating within Wagner Group's military organisation, in particular has notable Neo Nazi elements.

The group is referred to as a "sabotage and assault reconnaissance group", which has been fighting as part of the Russian separatist forces in eastern Ukraine. Rusich are described as a far-right extremist or neo-Nazi unit, and their logo features a Slavic swastika. The group was founded by Russian Neo-Nazis Alexey Milchakov and Yan Petrovsky in the summer of 2014, after graduating from a paramilitary training program run by the Russian Imperial Legion, the fighting arm of the Russian Imperial Movement. As of 2017, the Ukrainian Prosecutor General and the International Criminal Court (ICC) were investigating fighters of this unit for alleged war crimes committed in Ukraine. In June 2023, Wagner Group mutinied, but quickly stepped down.

=== Wagner Group ===
The Wagner Group, a Russian mercenary group notable in the Russo-Ukrainian War has been accused of Neo-Nazism.

The group is believed to have been named after Dmitry Utkin who was the military commander of the unit and had call sign “Wagner”, apparently chosen after Richard Wagner, the favorite composer of Adolf Hitler. Utkin was openly a Neo-Nazi. Members of the Wagner Group have been observed spray painting swastikas and SS lightning bolts, and Dmitry Utkin who was widely considered Wagner's operational commander, had tattoos featuring Nazi ″SS″ epaulets.

However, Erica Gaston, a senior policy adviser at the UN University Centre for Policy Research, stated that while the alleged founder has "sympathies to far-right groups and there's probably some in the general recruitment that also have those sympathies, predominantly, it's not an ideological group but a mercenary network "linked to the Russian security state".

== Ideology ==
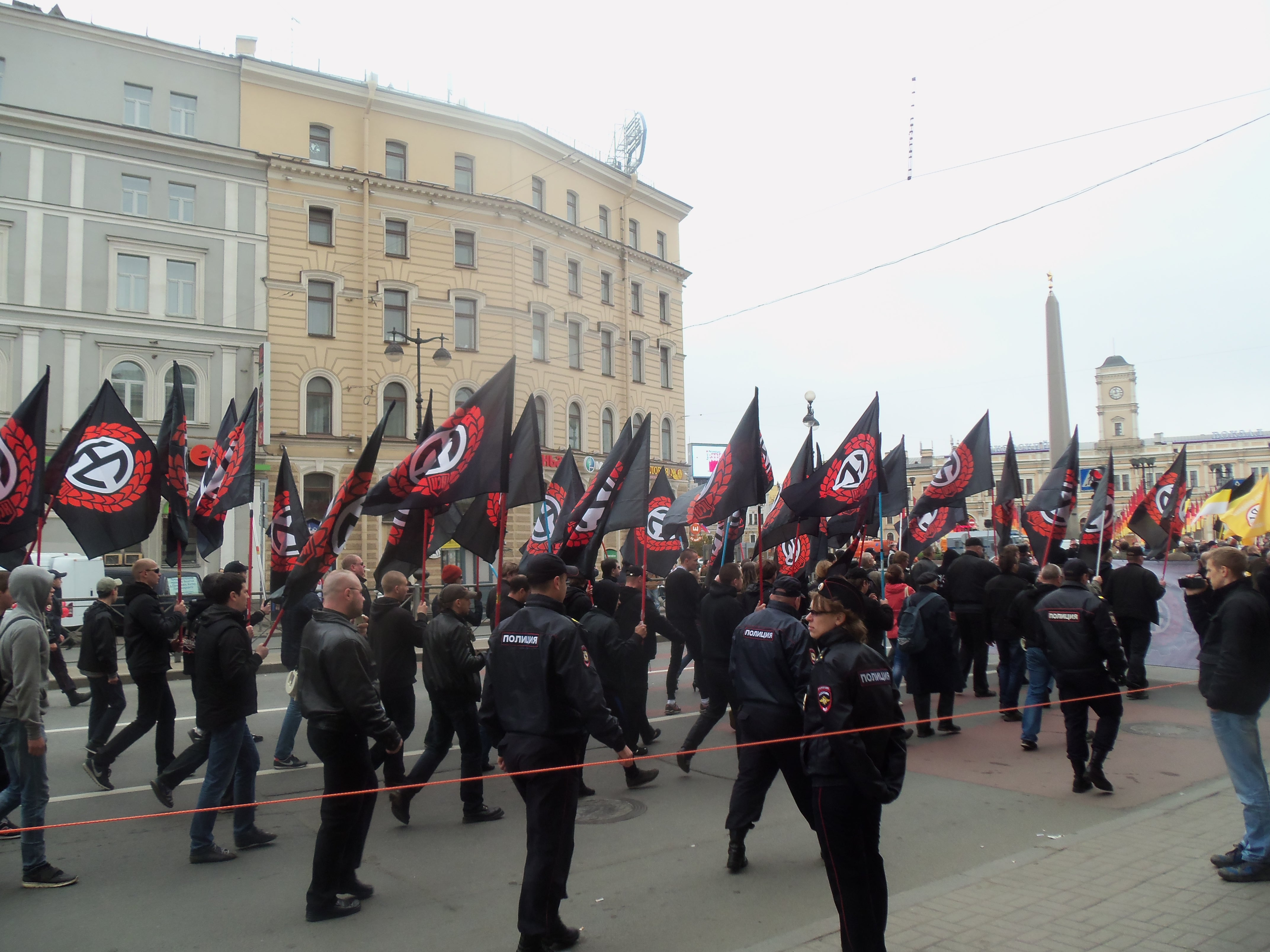
A column of neo-Nazis at the May Day procession in St. Petersburg, 2014

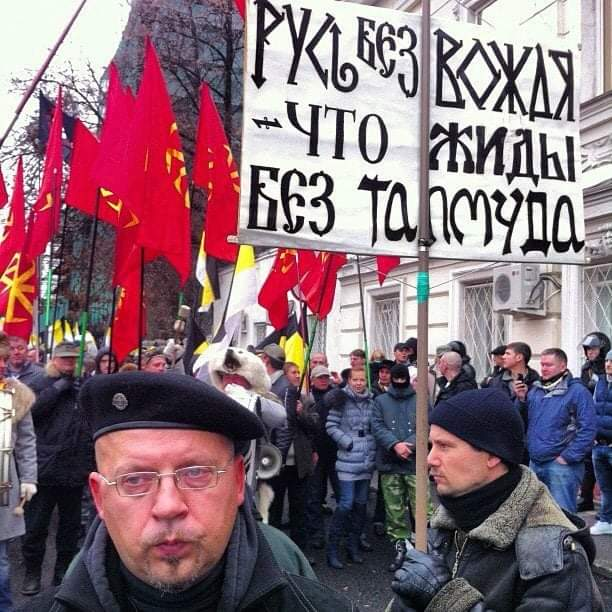
"Russian march" in 2012 in Moscow, poster against the background of flags with the nationalist and neo-pagan Kolovrat symbol

Like the old Nazism, Russian neo-Nazism combines ethnic nationalism, the idea of the Aryan race, its biological and cultural superiority over other races, the idea of racial antisemitism (the Semitic race is seen as the antipode and main enemy of the "Aryans"), anti-communism and anti-democratism. The cult of Adolf Hitler is significant, and swastika, or its various modifications, remain the main symbols.

One of the largest Russian nationalist extremist parties until the late 1990s was the neo-Nazi movement Russian National Unity (RNU), founded by Alexander Barkashov in 1990. In late 1999, RNU unsuccessfully attempted to run for the State Duma elections. Barkashov viewed "true Orthodoxy" as a fusion of Christianity and paganism, advocating for a "Russian God" and the "Aryan swastika" allegedly associated with him. He wrote about the Atlanteans, the Etruscans, and the "Aryan" civilization as the direct predecessors of the Russian nation, their centuries-long struggle with the "Semites", a "global Jewish conspiracy", and the "Jewish domination of Russia". The movement's symbol was a modified swastika. Barkashov was a parishioner of the Russian True Orthodox Church, and the first RNU cells were formed as brotherhoods and communities of the RTOU.

The ideology of Russian neo-Nazism is closely linked to the ideology of Rodnoverie (Slavic neo-paganism). In a number of cases, there are also organizational ties between neo-Nazis and neo-pagans; for example, one of the founders of Russian neo-paganism, Alexey Dobrovolsky (pagan name - Dobroslav) adhered to neo-Nazi ideas and included them in his neo-pagan teachings. Dobrovolsky called his ideology "Russian national socialism". He was the spiritual leader of the radical wing of Russian neo-paganism. According to historian Roman Shizhensky, Dobrovolsky adopted the idea of the swastika from the work of Nazi ideologue Herman Wirth, the first leader of Ahnenerbe. Dobrovolsky declared the eight-pointed "kolovrat", consisting of two overlapping swastikas, considered in Slavic neo-paganism to be the ancient Slavic sign of the Sun, to be the symbol of the uncompromising "national liberation struggle" against the "Jewish yoke". According to Dobrovolsky, the meaning of the "kolovrat" is entirely consistent with that of the Nazi swastika.

Historian Leo Klejn identified two opposing tendencies in Russian Slavic neopaganism: the first is a form of religious quest, a striving for spiritual unity with native nature and a healthy lifestyle, a religious modification of the green movement; the second is a form of nationalist propaganda, self-organization of chauvinists, and a religious framing of Russian neo-Nazism.

Another founding figure of post-Soviet neo-Nazism was former Komsomol activist Ilya Lazarenko; from 1992 to 1994, he led the neo-Nazi youth movement Front of National Revolutionary Action, which declared allegiance to Eastern Orthodoxy. In March 1996, a criminal case was opened against Lazarenko, which resulted in him becoming the first person in Russia to be convicted of inciting ethnic hatred. While under investigation, Lazarenko broke with Orthodoxy and, influenced by the ideas of Miguel Serrano, a founding figure of esoteric neo-Nazism, founded the neo-pagan neo-Nazi Navi Society (also known as the Holy Church of the White Race) in Moscow on 20 April (Hitler's birthday) 1996. The Navi Society was based on the worship of two supposedly Slavic gods, Yav and Navi, and had uniforms and rituals similar to those of the Ku Klux Klan. The doctrine of the society was a combination of Slavic neo-pagan ideas with Indo-Aryan and Zoroastrian beliefs. Lazarenko considered only Russians to be white. The main symbol of the movement was a swastika; others included the Novgorod cross with an inscribed swastika, runic inscriptions, a ram's skull, and Siegfried's sword. One of the society's goals was the extermination of people with physical deformities. In 2005 Lazarenko returned to Orthodoxy. According to Lazarenko, the coming of the “Third Rus',” a “thousand-year National Socialist Empire” called to usher in the “era of the New Sacred Civilization,” was nigh.

In contrast, right-wing politician and former neo-Nazi leader Alexei Shiropayev opposed the pro-imperial and Russo-centric variety of Russian neo-Nazism. He did not share anti-Westernism, instead having proposed seeking racial allies in the "white" West. Shiropayev doubted the unity of the Russian people and views it as a conglomerate of sub-ethnic groups, differing both psychologically and physiologically. For this reason, he advocated Russian separatism, believing that it would be easier to defend Russian interests in several small states composed of ethnic Russians than in a large multinational empire. Their center of power, in his view, should be a "Great Rus'," encompassing the central and northwestern regions of Russia, and it should become homogeneous in a "cultural and racial" sense and oriented toward German racial ideas. Shiropayev viewed this as an interim stage on the way to a period when the confederation of Russian republics will become a springboard for a "new white colonization" and the formation of a "modern neocolonial empire." Later, Shiropayev proposed dividing Russia into seven Russian republics and transforming it into a "federal commonwealth of nations," where nation is understood not in an ethnic but a political sense. Along with Ilya Lazarenko, Shiropayev argued that the project of a multi-ethnic Russian nation had failed, as ethnicity remained important for the population of Russia; the two presented these ideas in 2013 at the Higher School of Economics in Moscow. Shiropayev proposed transforming the Central Federal District into the Republic of Zalesskaya Rus' and fostering a "Zalessian identity" within it. Lazarenko leads the Zalesskaya Rus' movement.

Rodnovery is a popular religion among Russian skinheads. These skinheads, however, generally do not practice the religion. During the trial of the skinhead organization Schultz-88 in 2005, Dobrovolsky's brochure "Paganism as the Spiritual and Moral Foundation of Russian National Socialism" and the neopagan magazine Gnev Peruna (The Wrath of Perun) were mentioned. Members of the neo-Nazi group Combat Terrorist Organization, disbanded by the police in 2006, identified themselves as Rodnovers; they published samizdat magazines with a racist and neo-pagan orientation, where they developed ideas for the creation of a "new Nordic race". They called for a "pagan revolution", which they aimed to accomplish by hunting down people of "non-Slavic appearance".

== See also ==
- Russian nationalism
- Racism in Russia
- Ruscism
- Sideburns (film), a satire by Yuri Mamin on Russian Neo-Nazi

== Literature ==
- Agursky, Mikhail (1975). "Неонацистская опасность в Советском Союзе" [The Neo-Nazi Threat in the Soviet Union]. Новый Журнал (in Russian) (118). New York: 199–204.
- Ilyushenko, Vladimir (2005). Ксенофобия, национализм, фашизм: лики русского неонацизма [Xenophobia, Nationalism, Fascism: The Faces of Russian Neo-Nazism] (in Russian).
- Ovsiyenko, Fridrikh; Trofimchuk, Nikolai; Odintsov, Mikhail, eds. (1998). Новые религиозные культы, движения и организации в России : словарь-справочник [New religious cults, movements, and organizations in Russia: a dictionary and reference book] (in Russian). Moscow: Russian Academy of Public Administration Press.
- Современная религиозная жизнь России. Опыт систематического описания [Contemporary Religious Life in Russia: An Attempt at a Systematic Description] (in Russian). Moscow: Logos. 2006.
- Новые религиозные организации России деструктивного, оккультного и неоязыческого характера [New religious organizations in Russia of a destructive, occult and neo-pagan nature] (in Russian). Palomnik. 2000.
- Klejn, Leo (2004). Воскрешение Перуна [The Resurrection of Perun] (in Russian). Saint Petersburg: Evraziya. ISBN 5-8071-0153-7. OCLC 57364474.
- Shizhensky, Roman (2012). "Опыт сравнительного анализа текстов А. А. Добровольского и Г. Ф. Вирта (к вопросу об источниковой базе российских неоязычников)" [An attempt at a comparative analysis of the texts of A. A. Dobrovolsky and H. F. Wirth (on the issue of the source base of Russian neo-pagans)].
- Shnirelman, Viktor (2012). Русское родноверие [Russian Rodnoverie] (in Russian). Moscow: Biblical Theological Institute of St. Andrew the Apostle. p. xiv + 302. ISBN 978-5-89647-291-9.
- Shnirelman, Viktor (2015). Арийский миф в современном мире [The Aryan Myth in the Modern World] (in Russian). Moscow: Novoye Literaturnoye Obozreniye. ISBN 978-5-4448-0279-3.
- "Subcultures, pop music and politics: skinheads and "Nazi rock" in England and Germany". Oxford University Press. 2004.
- Aitamurto, Kaarina (2007). "Russian Rodnoverie: Negotiating Individual Traditionalism". CESNUR. Archived from the original on 27 June 2021.
- Aitamurto, Kaarina (2018). "Родноверие, современное славянское язычество и сложности определения "религии"". Пантеон. Archived from the original on 25 May 2021.
- "Неонацизм в России" [Neo-Nazism in Russia]. Echo of Moscow.
