= Rodina (political party) =

All-Russian Political Party "Rodina" Всероссийская политическая партия «Родина»
- Leader: Aleksey Zhuravlyov
- Founders: Dmitry Rogozin; Sergey Glazyev; Sergey Baburin; Yury Skokov
- Founded: 14 February 2004; 22 years ago 29 September 2012; 14 years ago (refoundation)
- Dissolved: 28 October 2006; 19 years ago
- Preceded by: Party of Russian Regions
- Merged into: A Just Russia (2006–2012)
- Headquarters: 2nd Building, 27 Zemlyanoy Val Street; Moscow, Russia; 105064
- Youth wing: Tigers of Rodina
- Membership (2006): 135,000
- Ideology: Managed nationalism Russian ultranationalism; Conservatism (Russian); National conservatism; Social conservatism; Right-wing populism; Anti-communism; Anti-Zionism; Antisemitism; Faction: Neo-Nazism (Russian)
- Political position: Far-right
- National affiliation: Rodina (2004–2005); All-Russia People's Front
- International affiliation: World National-Conservative Movement (2015)
- State Duma group: Liberal Democratic Party of Russia
- Colours: Red
- State Duma: 1 / 450
- Seats in the Regional Parliaments: 6 / 3,994

Party flag

Website
- rodina.ru

The All-Russian Political Party "Rodina" (Note: Russian: Всероссийская политическая партия «Родина», romanized: Vserossiyskaya politicheskaya partiya «Rodina», IPA: [fsʲɪrɐˈsʲijskəjə pəlʲɪˈtʲitɕɪskəjə ˈpartʲɪjə ˈrodʲɪnə]) is a nationalist political party in Russia. It was established by Dmitry Rogozin in February 2004 from Party of Russian Regions, one of the three key components of the People's Patriotic Union "Rodina" bloc. The party's ideology combines "patriotism, nationalism, and a greater role for the government in the economy", and is described as pro-Kremlin. Its headquarters is located in Moscow.

In the 2003 legislative elections, Rodina bloc won 9.02% of the vote and ended up with 37 of the 450 seats in the State Duma. In the 2016 elections, the party won 1.51% of the vote and ended up with one seat. In the 2021 elections, it won 0.80% of the vote and ended up with one seat. The party supports President Vladimir Putin.

== Party name ==
The term rodina (Russian: родина) means "motherland". It is one of three words in the Russian language that express the concept of "native land". Otechestvo (отечество) and оtchizna (oтчизна) both translate into English as "fatherland" and "relate to the country in which one is a citizen". Rodina means one's birthplace and is identified with the nation's soul.

== History ==
=== 2003-2007 ===
Following allegations brought by the Communist Party and ousted reform-oriented liberal parties such as the Union of Right Forces and Yabloko that President Vladimir Putin's United Russia had manipulated elections to ensure a favorable outcome, Rodina declined to field its own candidate in the 2004 presidential elections. This created a schism within Rodina as Sergey Glazyev insisted on running for President under the banner of an officially separate Rodina party, but Dmitry Rogozin was able to consolidate his support and defeat Glazyev.

In the aftermath of the 2003 legislative elections, the party mostly supported the policies of President Putin. However, four Rodina deputies, including Dmitry Rogozin, went on a public hunger strike and locked themselves in their offices at the State Duma to protest the welfare reforms being pushed through by Putin's government in February 2005. The bloc since increasingly adopted the slogan Za Putina, Protiv Pravitel'stva ("For Putin, Against the Government") and stated that its immediate goal was to win a parliamentary majority in the 2007 legislative elections.

On 27 January 2005, nineteen members of the State Duma, including members of Rodina and the Communist Party, signed a petition to the prosecutor-general demanding that Jewish organisations be banned in the Russian Federation. This caused a political scandal, with President Putin (who was participating in commemorations for the anniversary of the liberation of Auschwitz on the day that the petition was issued) expressing shame over the petition's content and the Union of Councils for Soviet Jews issuing a statement roundly criticising the petition and its signers. The prosecutor-general in a later investigation declined to charge the signatories of the petition with fomenting racial hatred. In July 2005, the party's co-leader Sergey Baburin left the bloc, taking nine Duma deputies with him and forming an alternative group in the State Duma, which also calls itself Motherland. The split led to a reunification of Dmitry Rogozin's and Sergey Glazyev's supporters. Rogozin accused the Kremlin of waging a dirty war against his bloc, which he claims is feared by the United Russia party because of its potential electoral support. Rogozin had also announced intentions to take legal action against the State Duma for allowing Baburin to register his bloc in the Duma as Motherland, creating a potential for confusion within the electorate.

On 6 November 2005, Rodina was barred from taking part in the December elections to the Moscow Duma following a complaint filed by the Liberal Democratic Party of Russia that Rodina's advertising campaign incited racial hatred. The advertisement in question showed Caucasian immigrants tossing watermelon rinds to the ground and ended with the slogan "Let's clear our city of trash", calling for Russians to clean their cities of rubbish. It garnered much controversy and opinion polls predicted that Rodina would come second with close to 25% in the December vote. Rogozin appealed the decision, but the ban was upheld on 1 December 2005.

Rodina's difficulties continued into 2006, when it failed to obtain permission to contest local elections in a number of regions. However, the party did come third in the regional elections in Altai Republic. Rogozin unexpectedly stepped down as party leader in March 2006 and was replaced by the less known businessman Alexander Babakov. Many suspected this was a tactical decision on Rodina's part to ease pressure from the Kremlin, although a small number of party members in Moscow had been vocal in their criticism of Rogozin's more outlandish nationalist rhetoric. On 28 October 2006, Rodina merged with the Russian Party of Life and the Russian Pensioners' Party into a new party called A Just Russia. Many of Rodina's parliamentary faction joined the new party, except for Rogozin, Andrey Savelyev and Glazyev, who at present does not belong to any party. In 2007, Rogozin was appointed Russian Ambassador to NATO.

=== Since 2012 ===
Rodina was reinstated on 29 September 2012 and Aleksey Zhuravlyov, formally a member of the ruling United Russia, was unanimously voted to lead the party. Unlike the 2004 iteration of Rodina, which included a socialist faction, the revived Rodina includes groups affiliated with far-right subcultures including football hooliganism and neo-Nazism; Fyodor Biryukov, described as the party's ideologist, was previously a singer for neo-Nazi band Kolovrat. The party opposed the 2011–2013 Russian protests and members of the party's paramilitary have participated in attacks on migrants in Moscow.

In July 2017, the chairman of Rodina announced that the only candidate whom the party will support is current President Vladimir Putin for the 2018 presidential election.

In December 2023, Rodina announced that the party will support current President Vladimir Putin for the 2024 presidential election.

== Party platform ==
The party was described as "far-right" by Timothy Snyder in The New York Review of Books in March 2014.

Novaya Gazeta journalist Anna Politkovskaya stated that Rodina was a chauvinistic organisation that had been "created by the Kremlin's spin doctors" for the 2003 election and the "aim was to draw moderately nationalist voters away from the more extreme National Bolsheviks". The Guardian claims that Rodina was "set up by President Vladimir Putin's allies" in 2003 "to leach votes from the Communist party".

Rodina and its leader Dmitry Rogozin has made illegal immigration and a "Moscow for Muscovites!" platform a centerpiece of their election campaign.

== Electoral results ==
=== Presidential ===
Election	Candidate	First round		Second round		Result
Election	Candidate	Votes	%	Votes	%	Result
2004	Endorsed Vladimir Putin	49,563,020	71.91%	—N/a		Won
2008	Party was part of A Just Russia and did not participate in the elections					
2012	Party was part of A Just Russia and did not participate in the elections					
2018	Endorsed Vladimir Putin	56,430,712	76.69	—N/a		Won
2024	Endorsed Vladimir Putin	76,277,708	88.48	—N/a		Won

=== State Duma ===
Election	Leader	Votes	%	Seats	+/–	Rank	Government
2003	Sergey Glazyev	5,470,429	9.02	38 / 450		▲4th	Opposition
2007	Party was part of A Just Russia and did not participate in the elections						
2011	Party was part of A Just Russia and did not participate in the elections						
2016	Aleksey Zhuravlyov	792,226	1.51	1 / 450	▲1	▲8th	Support
2021	Aleksey Zhuravlyov	450,437	0.80	1 / 450	1	▼10th	Support
2026	Aleksey Zhuravlyov	469,972	0.71	1 / 450	1	▲9th	
