= Anton Shekhovtsov =

Ukrainian political scientist (born 1978)

- Антон Володимирович Шеховцов
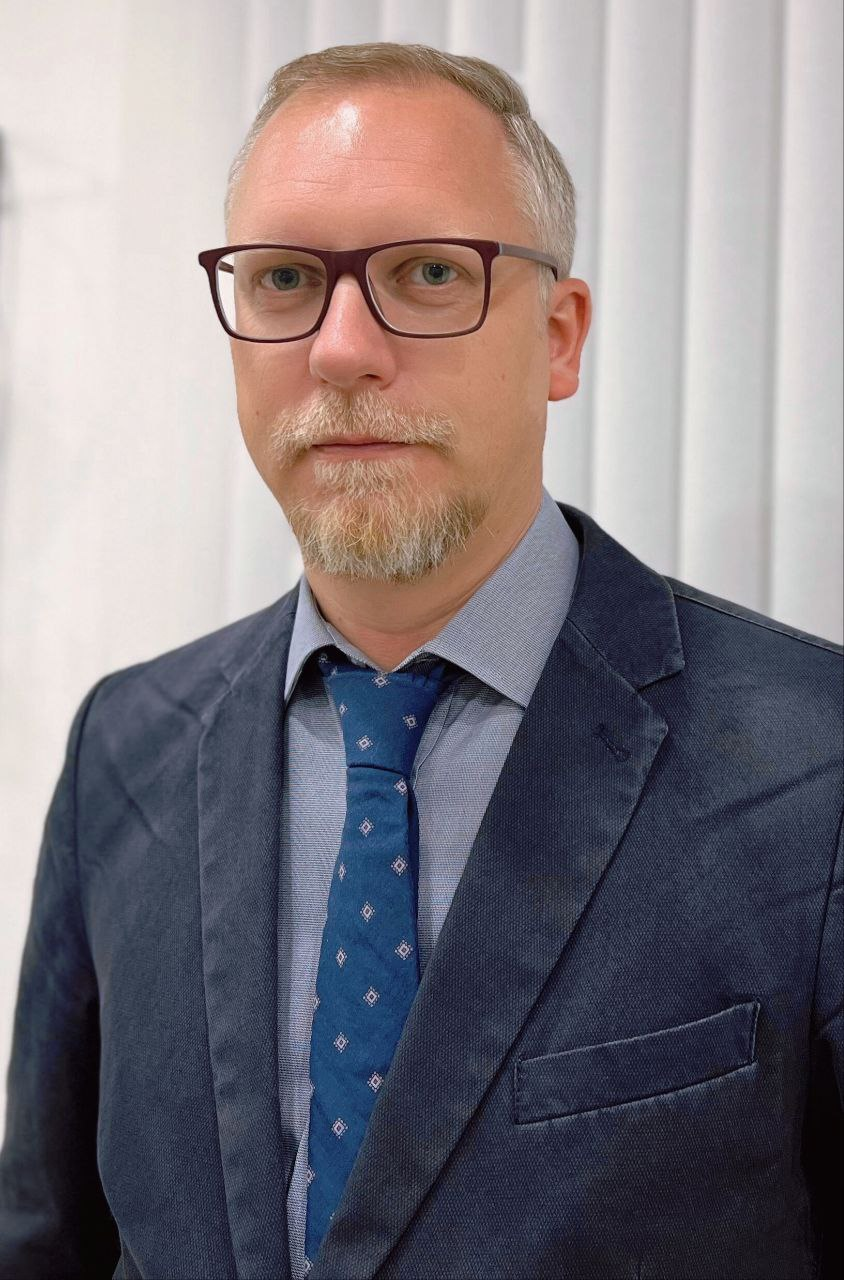
- Anton Shekhovtsov in 2025
- Born: 1978 (age 47–48); Sevastopol, Soviet Union
- Other name: Антон Владимирович Шеховцов
- Occupation: Academic

Academic background
- Education: Sevastopol National Technical University; University College London

Academic work
- Discipline: Political Science
- Main interests: Far-right movements in Europe, Neo-Eurasianism
- Website: shekhovtsov.org

Anton Volodymyrovych Shekhovtsov (Ukrainian: Антон Володимирович Шеховцов; Russian: Антон Владимирович Шеховцов; born 1978) is a Ukrainian political scientist, academic and writer. He is known for his writings on the European radical right and in particular its connections to Russia. He is the editor of the Explorations of the Far Right book series at ibidem-Verlag and is member of the board of the open access journal Fascism: Journal of Comparative Fascist Studies.

== Education ==
Shekhovtsov was born in 1978 in Sevastopol, then in the Ukrainian Soviet Socialist Republic, Soviet Union. He studied English philology at the Sevastopol National Technical University between 1995 and 2000, going on to teach business English at the European University in Kyiv between 2000 until 2002. He returned to his alma mater to complete an aspirantura in Political Science between 2006 and 2009, and lectured there until 2010.

== Academic career ==
Between 2010 and 2012 Shekhovtsov had two stints as a visiting fellow researcher at the University of Northampton, as part of the Radicalism and New Media Research Group. He then went on to complete a PhD in Slavonic and East European studies at University College London between 2013 and 2017.

2020 he founded with Andreas Umland in Vienna (Austria) the Centre for Democratic Integrity to "monitor and analyse attempts of authoritarian regimes based on illiberal value systems to wield malign influence in Europe".

Currently he is associated researcher at the Research Center for the History of Transformation in Vienna and visiting professor at the Department of International Relations of the Central European University in Vienna.

== Works ==
Shekhovtsov's works have been featured on/at OpenDemocracy, the Chatham House, Foreign Affairs, the Carnegie Council for Ethics in International Affairs and the Aspen Institute.

== Bibliography ==
- Radical Russian Nationalism: Structures, Ideas, Persons (2009) with Aleksandr Verkhovsky and Galina Kozhevnikova
- New Radical Right-Wing Parties in European Democracies: Determinants of Electoral Support (2011)
- White Power Music: Scenes of Extreme-Right Cultural Resistance (2012) with Paul Jackson
- The Postwar Anglo-American Far Right: A Special Relationship of Hate (2014) with Paul Jackson
- Russia and the Western Far Right: Tango Noir (2017)
- The Rise and Fall of a Polish Agent of the Kremlin Influence: The Case of Janusz Niedźwiecki (2022)

=== Articles and Book Chapters ===
- Wodak, Ruth; Khosravinik, Majid; Mral, Brigitte, eds. (2013), "From Para-Militarism to Radical Right-Wing Populism", Right-Wing Populism in Europe. Politics and Discourse, New York: Bloomsbury, pp. 249–264, doi:10.5040/9781472544940.ch-017
- With Umland, Andreas (2013), "Ultraright Party Politics in Post-Soviet Ukraine and the Puzzle of the Electoral Marginalism of Ukrainian Ultranationalists in 1994-2009", Russian Politics & Law, vol. 51, no. 5, pp. 33–58, doi:10.2753/RUP1061-1940510502
- "The Ukrainian Far Right and the Ukrainian Revolution", New Europe College Black Sea Link Program Yearbook 2014-2015, Bukarest: New Europe College, 2015, ISSN 1584-0298
- Laruelle, Marlene, ed. (2015), "Alexander Dugin and the West European New Right, 1989-1994", Eurasianism and the European Far Right: Reshaping the Europe-Russia Relationship, Lanham: Lexington Books, pp. 35–53, ISBN 9781498510684
- "The Phenomenon of the European Far Right and Their Foreign Policy Positions", Sociology of Power, 2021, doi:10.22394/2074-0492-2021-2-168-183, ISSN 2074-0492

== See also ==
- Edward Lucas
- Roger Griffin
