= Eduard Chuvashov =

Eduard Vladimirovich Chuvashov
- Born: November 25, 1962; Tula, Russia (then part of the Soviet Union)
- Died: April 12, 2010 (aged 47); Moscow, Russia
- Cause of death: assassination
- Body discovered: 24 Strelbishchensky Lane
- Resting place: Troyekurovskoye Cemetery
- Citizenship: USSR (1962–1991); Russia (1991–2010)
- Education: Moscow University of the Ministry of Internal Affairs of Russia
- Occupations: Judge, lawyer
- Years active: 2001-2010

Eduard Vladimirovich Chuvashov (November 25, 1962 - April 12, 2010) was a Russian judge and lawyer who was assassinated by 28-year-old Alexei Korshunov with a revovler as he left his home on 24 Strelbishchensky Lane in the city of Moscow. He was likely assassinated for his convictions against nationalist groups like the White Wolves Gang.

== Biography ==
Chuvashov was born in Tula, Russia (then the Soviet Union) in 1962, he graduated from the Moscow University of the Ministry of Internal Affairs of Russia and became Chief of the Criminal Police of the Presnensky District Department of Internal Affairs of Moscow. In December 2001, he was appointed as a federal judge of the Gagarinsky District Court of Moscow from 2005 to 2008 and gained fame for convicting Elena Klimenkova, who was accused of embezzling $46 million Rubles from Sberbank.

In March 2008, he became a judge in the Moscow City Court and dealt with high-profile criminal cases including corruption in the Russian Ministry of Internal Affairs and convicted several members of Neo-Nazi gangs including the White Wolves and the Ryno-Skachevsky gang.

In 2010, Judge Chuvashov was proceeded over two terrorism cases, a murder trial perpetrated by Sergei Konoplin and Konstantin Gryzunkov due to hooliganism and the trial of Vladimir Belashev, a member of the Revolutionary Military Council who were responsible for blowing up a statue of Tsar Nicholas II and the attempted destruction of a statue of Peter I by Zurab Tsereteli in 1997.

== Murder and Investigation ==
On April 12, 2010, as Judge Chuvashov was exiting his apartment on 24 Strelbishchensky Lane in Moscow, Russia, he was approached by 28-year-old Alexei Korshunov who shot him multiple times with a revovler before fleeing the scene leaving Chuvashov to die.

Russian authorities began an investigation into Judge Chuvashov's death and, by May 2010, announced that the investigation had definitively linked Chuvashov's murder to his professional activities as a judge. On June 25, 2010, Alexander Ivanovich Bastrykin announced that the investigation expected to solve the crime soon and that the main version regarding its motives remained the judge's professional activities. By March 2010, Alexei Korshunov became a suspect due to his close friendship with Nikita Tikhonov, a nationalist who was involved in the 2009 murder of Stanislav Markelov and Anastasia Baburova. Korshunov was fled to Zaporizhzhia, Ukraine and died in October 2011, when one of his personal grenades exploded while he was on a jog.

On June 27, 2012, Two 27-year-old residents Maxim Baklagin and Vyacheslav Isaev, were detained. Both men were involved in Neo-Nazi groups since 2004 and were involved in serious crimes from 2008 to 2010. On June 28, 2012, the Investigative Committee filed charges against Vyacheslav Isaev and Maxim Baklagin, who were detained on suspicion of involvement in the murder of a Moscow City Court judge, as well as other crimes. The young men are charged with murder committed by an organized group motivated by ideological hatred, an attempt on the life of the judge, and illegal possession of weapons. It was discovered that, although registered in the Moscow region, they were hiding in a rented apartment in the Vladimir region. It was there that they were arrested. The detainees attempted to resist but were quickly subdued. A search of the apartment revealed a Finnish Suomi submachine gun, a Makarov pistol, and a hand grenade. According to media reports, Baklagin and Isaev were initially suspected of another murder. According to investigators, in 2009, they, along with their associate Yuri Tikhomirov, stabbed to death anti-fascist Ilya Dzhaparidze. All three suspects were soon detained, but Baklagin and Isaev were released on their own recognizance. They escaped and have been wanted ever since. Tikhomirov was sentenced to ten years in prison. While the young men were being sought, investigators concluded that they may have assisted Alexei Korshunov, the alleged killer of Judge Chuvashov. In October 2012, Baklagin confessed to following Chuvashov and illegally possessing weapons and ammunition in a closed session of the Moscow City Court.

On December 11, it became known that Baklagin and Isaev were accused of creating an organized crime group that hid under the name "BORN" (Battle organization of Russian nationalists). According to investigators, the group included Isaev, Baklagin, Nikita Tikhonov, and Aleksey Korshunov, along with possibly other unidentified individuals. They had been engaged in criminal activity since at least 2008. Law enforcement officials first discovered the group in 2009 during the investigation into the murder of lawyer Markelov and journalist Baburova, and the arrest of Nikita Tikhonov and Evgeniya Khasis. According to investigators, Tikhonov and Khasis mentioned surveillance of Chuvashov in their conversations. According to investigators, the surveillance of Chuvashov and Khutorskoy was organized by Isaev and Baklagin, and the murder of both was committed by Korshunov. In addition to the murders of the federal judge and the anti-fascist, the Investigative Committee of Russia (ICR) charges the detainees with the murder of anti-fascist Ilya Dzhaparidze, the murder of world champion Muay Thai Muslim Abdullaev, the murder of taxi driver Sos Khachikyan, who was a defendant in the case of the beating of a pregnant Euroset employee, and the attempted murder of Golyanovo police officer Gagik Benyaminyan, who was involved in a property dispute between a Muscovite and her neighbors from Central Asia. Nikita Tikhonov was also transferred from the penal colony to a Moscow pretrial detention center. Investigators accuse him of complicity in the murder. According to the investigation, despite the fact that at the time of the murder he was under investigation for the murders of Markelov and Baburova, the nationalist was involved in preparing the crime and handed Korshunov the pistol with which he killed the judge. According to some reports, Tikhonov gave a confession . Also, during the search of Tikhonov, a photograph and address information for the judge were found. According to the investigation, Nikita, while still at large, together with his accomplices, developed a plan to murder Chuvashov, but did not take part in it, as he ended up behind bars, and Mikhail Volkov, who was hiding in Ukraine, are suspected of complicity in the murder. Ilya Goryachev, who was arrested in Serbia and extradited to Russia, and who, according to investigators, was the leader of BORN, was also charged with complicity in the murder. However, this charge was later dropped. On March 25, 2014, the case of the BORN group was transferred to court.
