= Russian National Unity =

Neo-Nazi group in Russia (1990–2000)

Russian National Unity Русское национальное единство
- Abbreviation: RNU (English); РНЕ (Russian)
- President: Alexander Barkashov
- Founded: 1990; 36 years ago
- Dissolved: 2000; 26 years ago
- Split from: NPF "Pamyat"
- Headquarters: Moscow, Russia
- Newspaper: Russian order
- Membership (2000 est.): approx. 20,000–25,000
- Ideology: Neo-Nazism
- Political position: Far-right
- Slogan: "Russia for Russians"
- Part of: World Union of National Socialists

Party flag

Website
- soratnik.com (archived 2016)

Russian National Unity (RNU) or All-Russian civic patriotic movement "Russian National Unity" (Russian: Общероссийское общественное патриотическое движение «Русское национальное единство» (РНЕ), romanized: Obshcherossiyskoye obshchestvennoye patrioticheskoye dvizheniye "Russkoye natsionalnoye yedinstvo", RNE) was an unregistered neo-Nazi, irredentist group based in Russia and formerly operating in states with Russian-speaking populations.

It was founded in 1990 by the ultra-nationalist Alexander Barkashov. The movement advocated the expulsion of non-Russians and an increased role for traditional Russian institutions such as the Russian Orthodox Church. The organization was unregistered federally in Russia, but nonetheless collaborated on a limited basis with the Federal Security Service. The group was banned in Moscow in 1999 after which the group gradually split up in smaller groups and their webpage became defunct in 2006.

== History ==
In 1989, Barkashov was the second in command in Russian National-Patriotic Front Pamyat. His conflict with Dmitri Vasilyev resulted in Barkashov leading, in his words, "the most disciplined and active members, dissatisfied with empty talk and theatrical stunts, out of Pamyat". In 1990, RNU grew in the face of the economic and social difficulties faced by Russians in the course of the dissolution of the Soviet Union.

The Russian National Unity movement was founded on 16 October 1990 by a splinter group of the National Patriotic Front "Memory" (NPF "Pamyat"). It grew from 1990 to 1991. Members have been reported to wear black and camouflage uniforms. The group also adopted a red and white swastika emblem and openly expressed admiration for German National Socialism and public celebrations of the rise of the Nazis, although the organization officially denied any support for Nazi ideology. The group was active not only in Russia, but also in Estonia, Latvia, Lithuania and Ukraine. The RNU has attempted to unite nationalist groups by organizing Slavonic and then Russian sobors. They met with various groups to pursue common goals, but saw little progress.

By the middle of 1993, the RNU had become the most prominent Russian nationalist movement, with a wide network of regional divisions. In addition to engaging in political action, the RNU conducted military drills and tactical training. As the 1993 Russian constitutional crisis unfolded, the RNU militantly supported the Russian parliament over President Boris Yeltsin. In 1993, it also took part in defending and patrolling the White House, the residence of the Supreme Council of the Russian Federation, against the President's troops. Following Yeltsin's victory, the RNU worked illegally for several months. While underground, the movement continued to publish their newspaper Russian Order.

The same year, the organization was registered as "a club for military and patriotic upbringing" and later was recognized by local officials as "a volunteer people's self-protection unit". To help achieve its goals, the RNU developed a cadre of armed paramilitaries, known as Russian Vityazi, who were trained in the use of small arms and explosives.

On 15 October 1995, 304 delegates from 37 regional divisions attended a RNU conference in Moscow.

In 1998, Moscow's mayor Yuri Luzhkov, with the support of higher government officials, prohibited the second RNU regional conference from being held in Moscow.

At the peak of its popularity in 1999, RNU was estimated to have 20,000–25,000 active members all over Russia by state officials.

The group was banned in Moscow in 1999 and Barkashov lost the control of the group by 2000 after which the group was defunct.

After the ban on the group, members of RNU were often jailed and the organisation was split into a number of other groups. The members of these new groups, namely Alexander Barkashov, Russian Orthodox Army, and others have since have engaged in religious activities and pro-Russian activism in Donbas conflict. They also support the Russian invasion of Ukraine and expressed their readiness to fight against Ukraine.

== Ideology, tactics and activities ==
Promoting the notion of "Russia for Russians and compatriots", members of the party (sometimes called Barkashovites) endorse policies including the expulsion of minorities that "have their homeland outside Russia", especially Jews and migrants from the South Caucasus such as Azeri, Georgians and Armenians as well Central Asian nationalities such as Kazakhs, Uzbeks, Tajiks, and others like South Asians. Their vision of Russia is divided into privileged ethnic Russians, who would be guaranteed majority political representation, and non-Russians who live in Russia and have their national homeland there, including indigenous populations of Russian Far East, North, Turkic and some other minorities.

New recruits (storonniki, literally "supporters" or "siders") to the organization have traditionally been required to serve as low-level functionaries in the organization, acting as drivers and handing out flyers as well as attending instructional sessions on the group's philosophy and beliefs, many of which are derived from a book written by Barkashov. As members advance, they may attain the rank of spodvizhniki (literally archaic, high-style for "co-workers" or "co-endeavourers") and are entitled to wear the insignia and participate in paramilitary training. The most dedicated members advance to the ranks of the soratniki (literally "comrades-in-arms"), who serve as the leadership of the group.

Members of some local RNE groups have been convicted of serious racist crimes, such as in the case of the RNE group in Tver who vandalized Jewish and Muslim graves, murdered and assaulted individuals belonging to ethnic minorities, and spread racial hatred, among other crimes.

Reportedly, RNE talked about killing Jews and Gypsies who reside in Russia. Concerning Adolf Hitler, Barkashov declared: "I consider [Hitler] a great hero of the German nation and of all white races. He succeeded in inspiring the entire nation to fight against degradation and the washing away of national values." Regardless of the RNE's resemblance to Nazism, founder Barkashov rejected the labels 'fascist' and 'Nazi', however, he admitted to being a national socialist. The group had a membership of around 20,000–25,000 members before its breakup in 2000.

== See also ==
- Anti-Armenian sentiment
- Anti-Azerbaijani sentiment
- Anti-Georgian sentiment
- Anti-Afghan sentiment
- Anti-Bengali sentiment
- Anti-Indian sentiment
- Anti-Pakistan sentiment
- Antisemitism in the Soviet Union
- Antisemitism in Russia
- Collaboration in the German-occupied Soviet Union
- Racism in Russia
- Russian Imperial Movement
- Russian Liberation Army
- Russian National Unity (2000)
