= Managed nationalism =

Russian governmental policy of cooperation with far-right groups

Managed nationalism or controlled nationalism (Russian: Управляемый национализм, romanized: Upravlyayemyy natsionalizm) is a term used by some academics to refer to an informal policy of pragmatic collaboration with Russian nationalists and neo-Nazis (or in broader cases, the Russian far-right as a whole) pursued by the government of Russia under Vladimir Putin. Beginning after Putin's election as President of Russia in 2000 and escalating after the 2004 Orange Revolution in Ukraine, managed nationalism led to the promotion of the Russian Image organisation throughout the late 2000s until the 2009 murders of human rights activists Stanislav Markelov and Anastasia Baburova, at which point Russian Image was dissolved.

Since the 2011–2013 Russian protests and Euromaidan, managed nationalism has faced a revival, with far-right militants supporting the anti-Maidan and Novorossiya. The policy of managed nationalism is closely linked to other Russian government policies of promoting neo-Nazism and other far-right movements in foreign countries.

== Background ==
Neo-Nazism in Russia emerged during the late 1990s from skinhead and football hooligan subcultures, as well as increasing anti-Chechen sentiment driven by the First Chechen War. By the late 1990s, Russian cities had been hit by a wave of neo-Nazi violence, leading to calls for the Russian government to pass anti-extremist legislation. In 2000, after becoming President of Russia, Vladimir Putin sought to placate the demands of anti-Nazi groups by passing anti-extremist legislation which has since been used to target opposition to Putin's government.

However, while passing anti-extremist legislation, Putin's government first began developing the policy of managed nationalism. Walking Together, a pro-Putin youth movement, reached out to White Society-88, one of Russia's largest skinhead gangs, by recruiting from among the latter's members to bolster its own ranks.

=== Role of the colour revolutions ===
The colour revolutions were a series of peaceful protests and popular uprisings that spread throughout the post-Soviet states during the mid-2000s, aimed primarily at anti-corruption and democratic reformism. Protesters successfully toppled corrupt or authoritarian governments in Georgia, Kyrgyzstan, and Ukraine. This process was viewed as concerning by the government of Russia and Putin, who has been alleged to have concerns about the possibility of a colour revolution occurring in Russia. The colour revolutions, as well as Putin's reaction to them, led him to pursue a strategic alliance with neo-Nazi groups in a bid to retain power.

== Early period ==
After the 2004 Orange Revolution in Ukraine, Putin increased cooperation with neo-Nazi groups in order to shore up his position within Russia. This was exemplified by a 2005 speech by Vasily Yakemenko, in which he advocated for recruiting skinheads to youth groups. These groups, particularly hooligans, were used as a form of intimidation against Russian oppositionists, such as a clash with the National Bolshevik Party in 2005 that injured ten and a 2009 attack on environmentalists opposing plans to build a road through Khimki Forest.

In 2008, with the growing strength of Alexei Navalny's unified movement of liberal and nationalist Russian dissidents, the Russian government leaned heavily into Russian Image, a neo-Nazi militant group. Russian Image soon developed a significant media presence, participating in televised discussions with members of the Russian government, meeting with State Duma member Maksim Mishchenko, and hosting a concert by Rock Against Communism band Kolovrat at Bolotnaya Square. The Russian government also ignored murders committed by neo-Nazi groups and their glorification in an internet documentary published by the group.

=== Crackdown on Russian Image ===
Following the murders of human rights activist Stanislav Markelov and Novaya Gazeta journalist Anastasia Baburova in 2009, a crackdown on members of Russia's neo-Nazi community began. Co-founder of Russian Image Nikita Tikhonov, as well as his wife Yevgenia Khasis, were arrested and charged with murdering Markelov and Baburova. Ilya Goryachev, leader of Russian Image, fled Russia to Serbia, being extradited in 2013 and eventually convicted of involvement in the murders in 2015, as well as those of three others. Court documents during Goryachev's trial revealed that Russian Image had direct links to the Presidential Administration of Russia, which supported it in its efforts to take leadership over the Russian far-right from Eduard Limonov and the Movement Against Illegal Immigration.

Reception of Russian Image among other neo-Nazi and skinhead groups has been critical, with specific note being given of their support from the Russian government. Dmitry Demushkin, leader of the Slavic Union, claimed in 2010 that the former organisation "was a double organisation, created by the Kremlin."

== 2011–2013 Russian protests ==
With the beginning of the 2011–2013 Russian protests against the Russian government, managed nationalism once again was used by the Russian government to attack opposition protesters. Nashi, a group descended from the earlier Walking Together, was among the largest groups of counter-protestors. The Eurasian Youth Union, a non-Nazi but nonetheless far-right organisation which also participated in counter-protests, has been described by Finnish researcher Veera Laine as being among the groups supported by the Russian government under the managed nationalism policy.

== Managed nationalism and Ukraine (2014–present) ==
The Russian response to Euromaidan marked a significant revitalisation of managed nationalism. Neo-Nazis, monarchists, Stalinists, and Christian nationalists, as well as Cossack groups, formed the anti-Maidan coalition, and later became militants supporting the Donetsk and Luhansk People's Republics as part of the Russian people's militias in Ukraine, bringing together members of the Russian neo-Nazi community and others from throughout Europe. These militants have included former members of Russian Image, such as Aleksandr Matyushin, a field commander for the Donetsk People's Republic. Another Russian Image member, Dmitrii Steshin, has become a war correspondent for Komsomolskaya Pravda.

Managed nationalism is also closely linked with Russia's policy of promoting far-right politics abroad. The Base, an American neo-Nazi terrorist organisation, is run from Saint Petersburg, and members of the global far-right have been given support by Russia in spreading Anti-Western sentiment domestically, as well as serving as election monitors for the Russian government abroad.

== See also ==
- Angry patriots
- Ruscism
