= Ivan Khutorskoy =

Russian anti-fascist activist (1983-2009)

Ivan Igorevich Khutorskoy (February 17, 1983, Moscow – November 16, 2009, Moscow) was a RASH skinhead, nicknamed "Bonecrusher," who was a prominent member of the Russian anti-fascist movement. He was murdered in his home in a suburb of Moscow.

He was shot by a pistol in his own doorway on November 16, 2009. The group Combat Organization of Russian Nationalists (BORN, Russian: Боевая организация русских националистов (БОРН)) claimed responsibility for the killing, although several media outlets have questioned the existence of that organization. There are even claims that the entire organization is "purely comic-opera character."

== See also ==
- Antifaschistische Aktion
- List of unsolved murders (2000–present)
- Red and Anarchist Skinheads
- Combat Organization of Russian Nationalists
- Combat Terrorist Organization
- NS/WP Crew
- The Savior (paramilitary organization)
