= Russian National Unity (2000) =

Russian paramilitary organization (2000–2013)

New Russian National Unity Новое Русское национальное единство
- Abbreviation: VOPD RNU (English); ВОПД РНЕ (Russian)
- Leader: Board of Regional Commanders
- Founders: Mikhail Lalochkin; Yevgeny Lalochkin
- Founded: 21 September 2000
- Dissolved: 2013
- Split from: Russian National Unity
- Headquarters: Saint Petersburg
- Newspaper: Evpaty Kolovrat, Nation
- Ideology: Neo-Nazism; Russian ultranationalism Monarchism
- Political position: Far-right
- Religion: Russian Orthodoxy
- International affiliation: World Union of National Socialists
- Colours: Maroon
- Slogan: "Russia for Russians"

Party flag

Website
- rusnation.org/org.shtml

The All-Russian Public Patriotic Movement «Russian National Unity» (VOPD RNU; Russian: Всероссийское общественное патриотическое движение «Русское национальное единство»; ВОПД РНЕ; Vserossiyskoye obshchestvennoye patrioticheskoye dvizheniye «Russkoye natsional'noye yedinstvo», VOPD RNE) was a Russian unregistered nationalist paramilitary organization that existed in 2000–2013 as a result of the split of the previously united organization Russian National Unity (1990). It was managed by a council of regional commanders. The organization was a member of the World Union of National Socialists.

== History ==
In the fall of 2000, a conflict occurred in the leadership of the RNU, as a result of which on September 21, 2000, at a closed plenum of the commanders of 16 regional branches, it was announced that the founder and leader of the movement, Alexander Barkashov, was expelled from the ranks of RNU. According to another version, the organization split into the "Barkashov's Guard" and the RNU of the Lalochkin brothers (leaders of the Saint Petersburg and Voronezh cells). In October of the same year, on the basis of the Moscow and Stavropol branches of RNU, a moderate patriotic movement "Russian Revival" by O. Kassin was created. Dmitry Demushkin, who founded his own movement Slavic Union, also separated from RNU.

The few regional organizations that expressed their distrust of Alexander Barkashov and set themselves the goal of "preserving" RNU, united into a "network" leaderless structure, where the Council of (Unknown Fathers) commanders became the highest governing body. And the Orthodox ideology has finally taken root as the main one.

In 2013, the organization was disbanded due to a lack of precise guidance.

== Accusations ==
After the split, the RNU FOPD retained its old name and all the RNU attributes. The Lalochkin brothers played a leading role in the organization. Mikhail Lalochkin headed the central St. Petersburg branch, and Evgeny headed the Voronezh organization.

The “new” RNU has no clear leader. In terms of its structure, the RNU now resembles rather a network structure, a kind of network of autonomous mobile, classified organizations.

From 2006 to 2008, the newspaper "Evpatiy Kolovrat" was published in St. Petersburg. On May 26, 2008, the Mozhaisk City Court banned the newspaper, declaring it extremist.

On May 12, 2008, the former leader of the Voronezh branch of RNU, Yevgeny Lalochkin, was detained by a police squad for a street fight. The press service of the Central Internal Affairs Directorate of the Voronezh Region reported that during a search, eight cartridges of 9 mm caliber, a Makarov pistol, which in 1992 was stolen from a unit of the Ministry of Defense, and a grenade were seized from him.

On May 17, 2008, Yevgeny Lalochkin was charged with storing and transporting weapons and ammunition. At the same time, the RNU cell in Kazan was destroyed.

In 2009, Nizhny Novgorod members of the RNU were accused of killing a citizen of Uzbekistan, and Moscow members of the murder of lawyer Stanislav Markelov and journalist Anastasia Baburova.

In 2010, St. Petersburg members of RNU were accused of blowing up a draisine.
