= Murders of Stanislav Markelov and Anastasia Baburova =

Murder in Russia on 19 January 2009

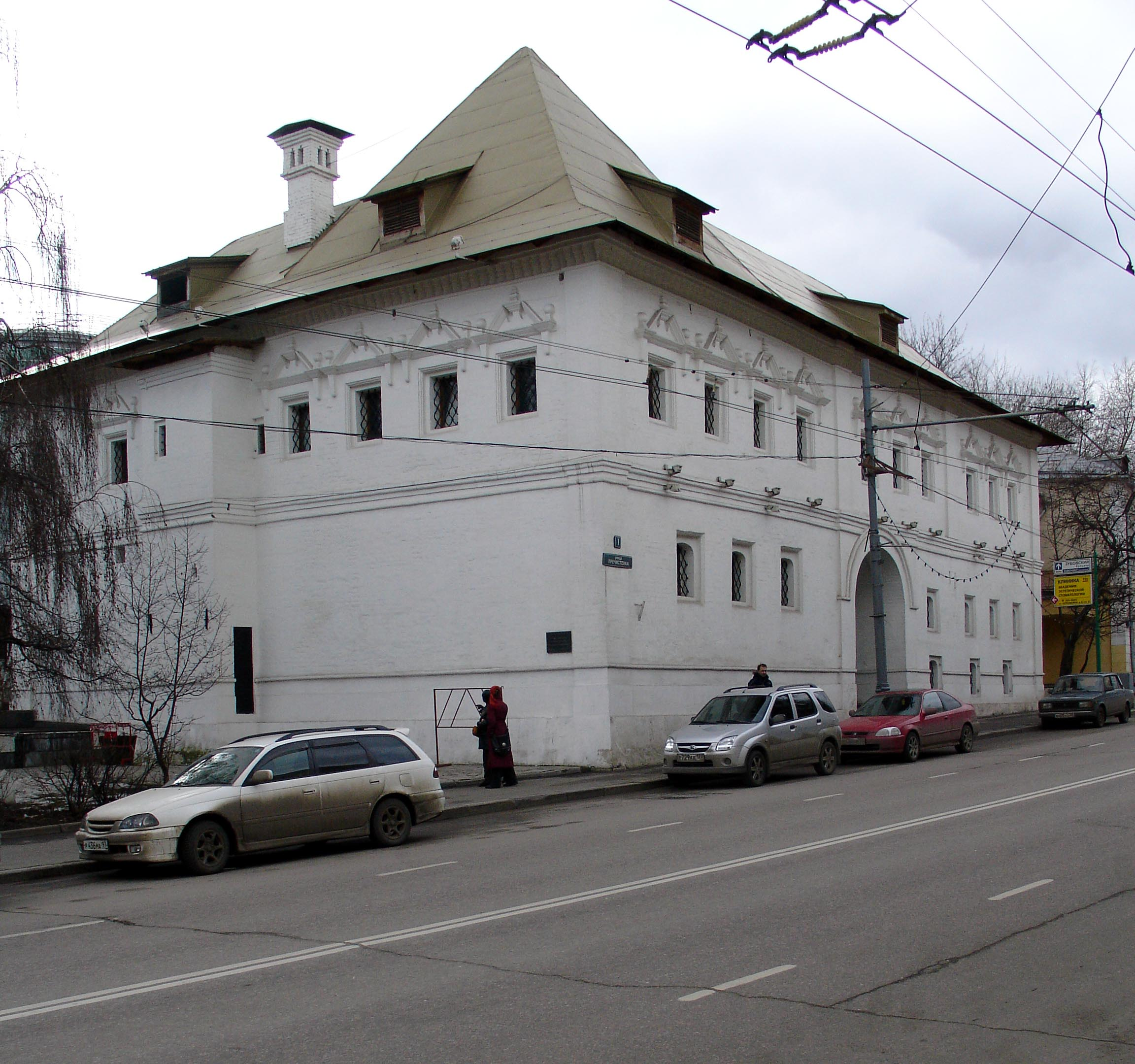

- Moscow (Moscow) Moscow (Russia)
- Location: 55.7438°N 37.5998°E; Moscow, Russia
- Date: 19 January 2009
- Attack type: Assassination
- Weapon: Browning 1910 pistol
- Deaths: 2
- Victims: Stanislav Markelov; Anastasia Baburova
- Perpetrator: Battle Organization of Russian Nationalists

On 19 January 2009, Russian journalist, Anastasia Baburova and human rights lawyer Stanislav Markelov, were shot and killed by members of the neo-Nazi organization Battle Organization of Russian Nationalists. Baburova became the fourth Novaya Gazeta journalist to be killed since 2000.

== Murder ==
Stanislav Markelov was shot to death on 19 January 2009 on Prechistenka street while leaving a news conference in Moscow less than 800 metres (1/2 mi) from the Kremlin; he was 34. Anastasia Baburova, a journalist for Novaya Gazeta who tried to come to Markelov's assistance, was also shot and killed in the attack. The weapon used in the shooting was a Browning 1910 pistol.

At first it was reported that Baburova had been wounded in an attempt to detain Markelov's killer, but later Russian law enforcement authorities declared that Baburova was shot in the back of the head. Baburova died a few hours after the attack at a Moscow hospital.

== Aftermath ==
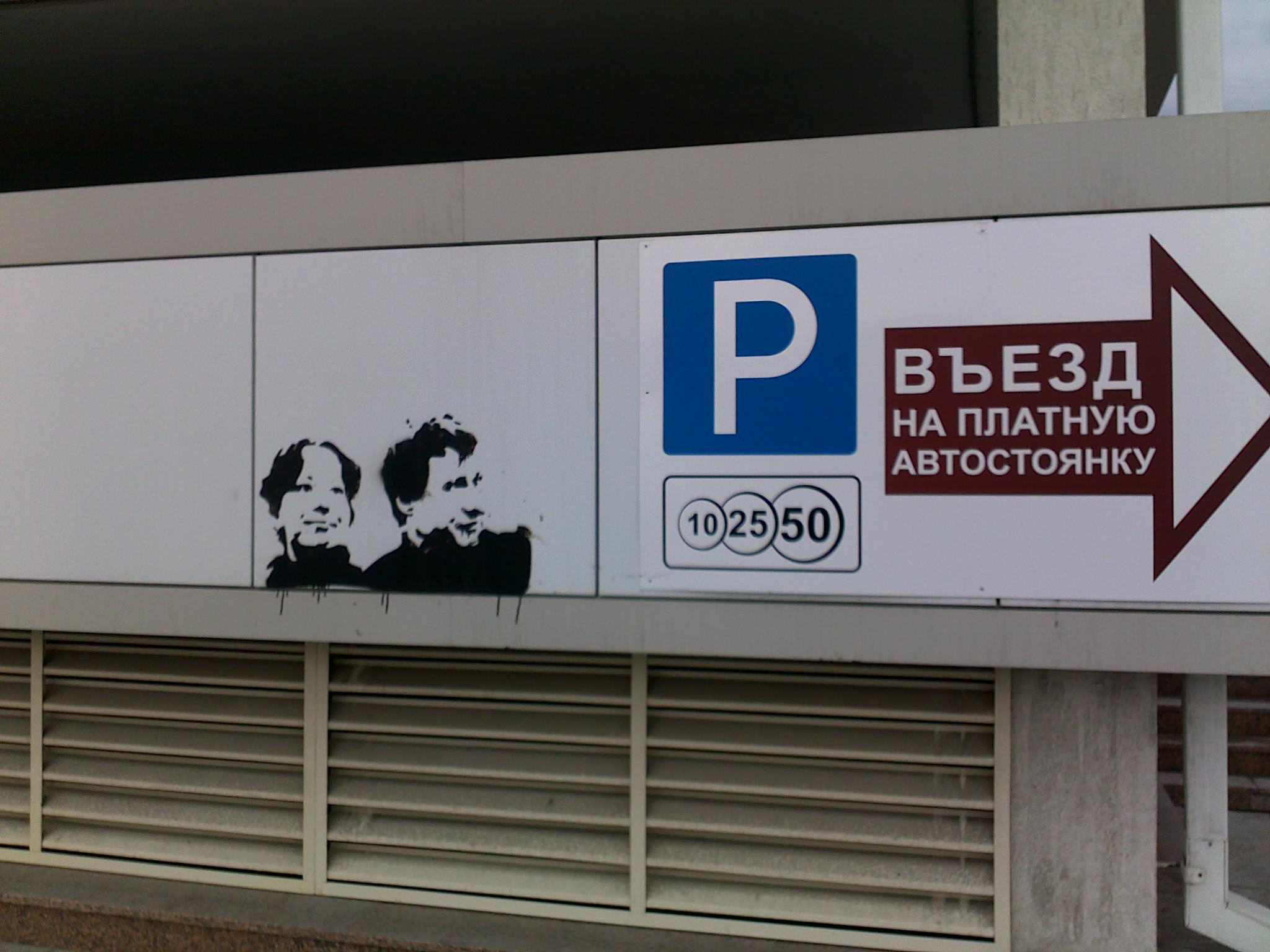
Graffiti on a parking lot of the Tyumen Regional State Library, dedicated to Markelov and Baburova. Tyumen, Russia.

=== Reactions ===
Close to 300 young people protested in Moscow with slogans such as "United Russia is a fascist country" and "Markelov will live forever". More than 2,000 people took to the streets of Grozny.

Then President of Ukraine Viktor Yushchenko sent her parents a condolence telegram on 23 January 2009. Russian president Dmitry Medvedev gave his condolences six days later.

Human Rights Watch and Amnesty International requested an impartial investigation. A hate crimes expert, Galina Kozhevnikova, said in February 2009 that she received an e-mailed threat warning her to "get ready" to join Markelov.

The BBC reported that Markelov had planned to appeal the early release of Yuri Budanov. Budanov, sentenced to ten years in prison, was released early because he had "repented". When reached for a comment, Budanov denounced the killings as a provocation aimed at fueling animosity between Russians and Chechens and offered condolences to the families of the deceased.

Investigations by the radio station Echo of Moscow indicate that most people distrusted the authorities and thought they could not adequately investigate the murder and that the crimes would not be solved.

According to Russian military analyst Pavel Felgenhauer, the details of the murder indicate the involvement of Russian state security services. He stated:

In the opinion of the Novaya Gazeta staff, of which I am a member, the Russian security services or rogue elements within these services are the prime suspects in the murders of Baburova and Markelov. The boldness of the attack by a single gunman in broad daylight in the center of Moscow required professional preliminary planning and surveillance that would necessitate the security services, which closely control that particular neighborhood, turning a blind eye. The use of a gun with a silencer does not fit with the usual pattern of murders by nationalist neo-Nazi youth groups in Russia, which use homemade explosives, knives, and group assaults to beat up and stab opponents to death.

The offices of Russia's rulers President Dmitry Medvedev and Prime Minister Vladimir Putin have not issued any statements expressing indignation or offering any condolences after the two murders. This follows the usual behavioral pattern of the authoritarian Putin regime when its critics are murdered in cold blood.

=== Burial ===
On 26 January 2009, Baburova was buried in the central city cemetery of her home town of Sevastopol.

== Investigation ==
In November 2009, Russian authorities declared the end of the criminal investigation. The murder suspects were 29-year-old Nikita Tikhonov and his girlfriend, 24-year-old Yevgenia Khasis, a radical nationalist couple involved with a group called Russky Obraz or Russian Image (Russian: Русский образ) and associated with the identitarian organization BORN (Russian: Боевая организация русских националистов).

Initially, "Russkiy Obraz" was a magazine, set up by Tikhonov and his friend Ilya Goryachev in 2002 as a clone of the radical fascist Serbian "Image" (Russian: Сербское "Образ") formed by Mladen Obradovic (Russian: Младен Обрадович), Deacon Boban Milovanovic (Russian: диакон Бобан Милованович) and Alexander Mishich (Russian: Александр Мишич). (Note: In 2012, Russkiy Obraz became the "Right-wing Conservative Alliance" (Russian: "обновленная версия" – "Правоконсервативный альянс") or Right-Conservative Alliance (PKA) (Russian: «Право-Консервативного Альянса» (ПКА)) and stated that the former leader of the Serbian Radical Party Vojislav Šešelj (Serbian Cyrillic: Војислав Шешељ) is an honorary citizen of Moscow. Both Anna Trigga, also known as Anna Vladislavovna Bogacheva (Russian: Анна Владиславовна Богачева), who is indicted by the United States for her participation with the Internet Research Agency to interfere with the 2016 United States elections and convicted Russian spy Maria Butina were members of the Conservative Alliance.) Both were students of history at Moscow State University. According to Tikhonov, the identitarian organization BORN was founded by him and Goryachev in 2007.

According to both Khasis and Sergey Smirnov, Russky Obraz was the political roof for BORN similar to Sein Fein's relationship to the Irish Republican Army. According to Khasis, Leonid Simunin was the BORN connection to the Kremlin and the presidential administration through Vladislav Surkov with a siloviki as the retired FSB officer Aleksey Korshunov (Russian: Алексей Коршунов) another strong supporter of BORN.

According to investigators, Tikhonov was the one who committed the murder, while Khasis reported to him, by cell phone, the movements of Markelov and Baburova right before the assault. The motive of the murder was revenge for Markelov's prior work as a lawyer in the interests of Trotskyite activists.

=== Legal proceedings ===
The murder suspects were arrested, and were reported to have confessed. In May 2011, Tikhonov was sentenced to life imprisonment, and Khasis was sentenced to 18 years in prison.

In 2015, Goryachev was sentenced for the murder of Markelov.

Early in 2022, the Supreme Court of Russia reduced Eugenia Khasis's sentence to 16 years 1 month. On November 28, 2025 Eugenia Khasis was released from the penal colony.
