= Ethnic nationalism in Russia =

Nationalism in Russia is nationalistic manifestations of the peoples of Russia in the territory of Russia.

The term "Nationalism in Russia" refers not only to ethnic Russian (East Slavic ethnic group) nationalism, but also refers to nationalist activities of national minorities in Russia.

In 1990s during the so-called "parade of sovereignties" Russian regions proclaimed its sovereignty.

In the past 20 years, nationalist activity takes place, for example, in Chechnya and Tatarstan.

Berezovsky argued that throughout its history, Russia has not fully passed through the nationalist idea. France, England, Turkey, Jews and others passed through the idea of nationalism. Berezovsky claimed that Russia would go through the nationalist idea, but he did not know how it would hit the rest of the non-Russians (Jews, Tatars, Caucasian peoples). The entire non-Russian population will certainly face this. Claimed that non-Russians faced nationalism in the 1990s. According to Berezovsky, the nationalist idea is a huge danger that the entire non-Russian population of Russia will face and will face on an increasing scale in the future.

Since the early 2010s, Putinism has been suppressing ethnic nationalism (whether ethno-Russian chauvinism or ethnic separatism) and promoting fascistic state nationalism; however, it does contain some elements of Russian ethno-nationalism.

== See also ==
- All-Tatar Public Center
- Balkar and Karachay nationalism
- Baltic Republican Party
- Caucasus Emirate
- Chechen Republic of Ichkeria
- Chechen–Russian conflict
- Circassian nationalism
- Ethnic nationalism in Japan
- List of ethnic groups in Russia
- Pan-Slavism
- Rossiyane
- Russia for Russians
- Russian ethnic nationalism
- Siberian regionalism
- Slavophilia
- Category:Tatar nationalism
