= Mikhail Agursky =

Soviet cyberneticist and dissident (1933–1991)

Mikhail (Melik) Agursky
- Михаил Самуилович Агурский
- Born: 1933; Moscow, USSR
- Died: August 21, 1991 (58 years old); Moscow, USSR
- Citizenship: Soviet Union, Israel
- Occupations: Cybernetist, historian, publicist
- Spouse: Vera Fiodorovna Kondratieva
- Children: 2

Academic background
- Education: Soviet Academy of Sciences

Academic work
- Institutions: ЭНИМС, НИИТМ, Hebrew University of Jerusalem
- Notable works: The Ideology of National Bolshevism

Mikhail Samuilovich Agursky (Russian: Михаи́л Самуи́лович Агу́рский; 1933 – 21 August 1991), real name Melik Samuilovich Agursky (Russian: Мэ́лик Самуилович Агу́рский), was a Soviet cyberneticist and dissident, who after emigration became a prominent Sovietologist and historian of National Bolshevism.

== Biography ==
=== Family ===
Mikhail Agursky was born in Moscow in 1933 to a Jewish family. His father, Samuil (Shmuel) Haimovich Agursky, was a revolutionary and later historian who had left the Russian Empire and spent time in England and the United States before returning to Russia during the Revolution. Samuil Agursky would fall foul of the authorities during the Stalin era, suffering internal exile to Kazakhstan, where he died in 1947. In 1955 Mikhail Agursky married Vera Fiodorovna Kondratieva, with whom he had a son and a daughter.

=== In the USSR ===
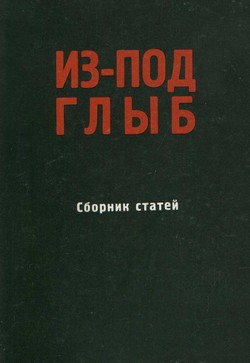
Cover of Из-под глыб (From Under the Rubble), a samizdat collection to which Agursky contributed (1974)

Mikhail Agursky received an education in engineering, and worked at the ЭНИМС before completing his aspirantura in cybernetics at the Soviet Academy of Sciences in 1969. After graduating he found employment at the НИИТМ, an institute directly subordinate to the Ministry of General Machine Building, where he worked until the autumn of 1970. During this period he also published a series of scientific works in specialised journals. In 1970 Agursky ended up unemployed after leaving the НИИТМ but failing to secure employment in the field of biocybernetics at the Institute of Automatization and Telemechanics (ИАТ). Having a family to support, he ended up working as a translator for academic journals and for the Journal of the Moscow Patriarchate, and cataloguing materials at the Moscow Theological Academy.

Agursky's activity was not limited to his sphere of expertise. Already in the 60s he had become acquainted with Alexander Men, and through him he was introduced to Soviet underground currents of thought, and in the 1970s, coinciding with the turmoil in his professional life, he became active in the dissident movement. In this period Agursky met Alexander Solzhenitsyn, Igor Shafarevich and others, collaborating with them in samizdat publications, most notably Из-под глыб, "From under the Rubble".

=== Emigration and death ===
His opposition to the Soviet regime eventually culminated in Agursky emigrating to Israel in 1975, where he became a fellow of the Soviet and East European Research Center at the Hebrew University of Jerusalem. He defended a second PhD thesis in Slavic Studies at the Sorbonne in 1983, titled "The National Roots of Soviet Power", and largely based on his book, The Ideology of National Bolshevism, which he had published (in Russian) in Paris in 1980. In that same year he became a lecturer at the Hebrew University of Jerusalem. In Israel he combined his academic activity with political analysis in the media as well as commentary on Soviet affairs.

Invited to a congress in his native Moscow, Agursky was found dead of a heart attack in his hotel room on August 21, 1991, amid the political chaos unleashed by the August putsch.
