= Stanislav Markelov =

Russian lawyer (1974–2009)

- Станислав Маркелов
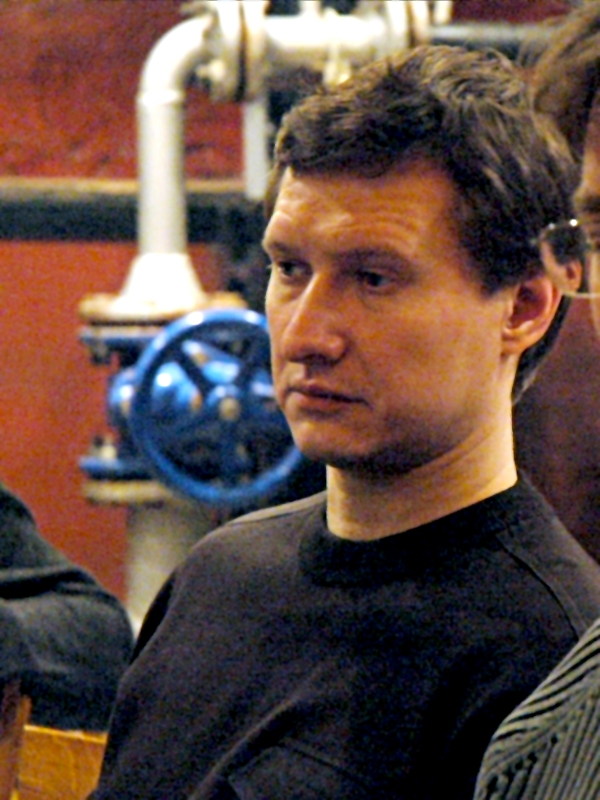
- Markelov in 2007
- Born: Stanislav Yuryevich Markelov; 20 May 1974; Moscow, Russian SFSR, Soviet Union
- Died: 19 January 2009 (aged 34); Moscow, Russia
- Cause of death: Murder
- Education: Moscow State Law University
- Occupations: Human rights lawyer and journalist

Stanislav Yuryevich Markelov (Russian: Станисла́в Ю́рьевич Марке́лов, IPA: [stənʲɪˈslaf ˈjʉrʲjɪvʲɪtɕ mɐrˈkʲeləf]; 20 May 1974 – 19 January 2009) was a Russian human rights lawyer. He participated in a number of publicized cases, including those of left-wing political activists and antifascists persecuted since the 1990s, as well as journalists and victims of police violence.

Markelov had been the attorney for the family of Elza Kungaeva, a young Chechen woman killed by Russian colonel Yuri Budanov, who was released from prison in mid-January, 15 months before his original sentence was to end. Markelov was murdered by members of the neo-Nazi organization BORN on 19 January 2009 in Moscow.

== Career ==
Markelov was a president of the Russian Rule of Law Institute. He represented Anna Politkovskaya, who was gunned down in Moscow in 2006; Mikhail Beketov, the editor of a pro-opposition newspaper who was severely beaten in November 2008; and many Chechen civilians who had been tortured. He also defended people who were victims of the Moscow theater hostage crisis.

== Assassination ==
Markelov was shot to death on 19 January 2009 on Prechistenka street while leaving a news conference in Moscow less than 800 metres (1/2 mi) from the Kremlin; he was 34. Anastasia Baburova, a journalist for Novaya Gazeta who tried to come to Markelov's assistance, was also shot and killed in the attack.

The president of Ukraine Viktor Yushchenko sent a telegram to the parents of Anastasia Baburova on 23 January 2009. Russian President Dmitry Medvedev offered his condolences six days later.

=== Reactions ===
Close to 300 young people protested in Moscow with slogans such as "United Russia is a fascist country" and "Markelov will live forever". More than 2,000 people took to the streets of Grozny. Human Rights Watch and Amnesty International requested an impartial investigation. A hate crimes expert, Galina Kozhevnikova, said in February 2009 that she received an e-mailed threat warning her to "get ready" to join Markelov.

=== Investigation ===
In November 2009, Russian authorities declared the end of the criminal investigation. The murder suspects were 29-year-old Nikita Tikhonov and his girlfriend, 24-year-old Yevgenia Khasis, a radical nationalist couple involved with a group called Russky Obraz or Russian Image (Russian: Русский образ) and associated with the identitarian organization Combat Organization of Russian Nationalists.

== His articles ==
- Stanislav Markelov, "Russia's 'Filtration System'"
- Stanislav Markelov, Do Not Read This book
