= Galina Kozhevnikova =

Russian human rights defender

Galina Vladimirovna Kozhevnikova (Russian: Галина Владимировна Кожевникова; 16 March 1974 in Kazan – 5 March 2011 in Moscow) was a Russian journalist and human rights activist. Galina Kozhevnikova was deputy director of the Moscow human rights center "Sova", a Russian non-governmental organization (NGO). She was known in Russia as a leading expert of problem of nationalism, researching xenophobia and ethnic hatred.

== Education ==
Kozhevnikova completed Rossiyskiy Gosudarstvennyy Gumanitarnyy Universitet, Istoriko-Arkhivnyy Institut at faculty of history-archival studies in 1997, where she also continued studies at the academic department of history of government institutions and public organizations.

== Career ==
Kozhevnikova started first work at the Information and Research Center "Panorama" in 1995, researching issues of the activities of federal executive authorities and state authorities of the constituent entities in Russia. When, in 2002, with the help of "Panorama" and Moscow Helsinki Group, was created "Sova Center", a NGO, researching xenophobia and ethnic hatred, she continued there work as a leading researcher. While researching ethnic hatred at "Sova", she was often receiving threats. Galina Kozhevnikova was actively working at "Sova", despite her serious illness, until her death.

== Death ==
Kozhevnikova died from a long illness on March 5, 2011, at the age of 36. Her colleagues, expressing sympathies about her early death, said that Kozhevnikova was a courageous researcher of nationalism and ethnic hatred in Russia. Tanya Lokshina, colleague from Human Rights Watch, said that Kozhevnikova was a leading researcher of xenophobia in Russia, "She had a completely encyclopedic mind. She knew more about this topic than anyone else".

== Publications ==
- Radical Nationalism in Russia in 2008, and Efforts to Counteract It
