= Anastasia Baburova =

Ukrainian-born Russian journalist (1983–2009)

- Анастасия Бабурова
- Born: 30 November 1983; Sevastopol, Ukrainian SSR, Soviet Union
- Died: 19 January 2009 (aged 25); Moscow, Russia
- Cause of death: Assassination
- Education: Moscow State University
- Occupation: Journalist/student
- Employer: Novaya Gazeta
- Spouse: Alexander Frolov (m. 2003; divorced 2007)

Anastasia Baburova (Russian: Анастасия Эдуардовна Бабурова, romanized: Anastasia Eduardovna Baburova; Ukrainian: Анастасiя Едуардівна Бабурова, romanized: Anatasiia Eduardivna Baburova; 30 November 1983 – 19 January 2009) was a journalist for Novaya Gazeta and a student of journalism at Moscow State University. She was born in Sevastopol, Ukrainian SSR. A member of Autonomous Action, she investigated the activities of neo-Nazi groups. She was shot and killed together with human rights lawyer Stanislav Markelov.

== Personal life ==
Baburova was the only child of Eduard Fyodorovich Baburov and Larisa Ivanovna Baburova, who were both professors at the Sevastopol National Technical University. Besides Russian and Ukrainian, which she considered her native languages, she also spoke English and French.

In 2000, she began studying at the Management-Faculty of the Black Sea branch of the Moscow State University. She went to Moscow in 2001 and became a student in international law at the Moscow State Institute of International Relations. In 2003, she married a fellow journalism student, Alexander Frolov, whom she met in 2000 during her studies in Sevastopol. In 2004, Baburova became a journalist student at the Moscow State University. Along with her studies, she worked as a freelance journalist for Vechernyaya Moskva, Rossiyskaya Gazeta and Izvestia. In the summer of 2007, Baburova and Frolov divorced.

== Political and journalistic activity ==
Baburova's political activity may be traced back to her having witnessed an attack by neo-Nazis on a foreigner, after which she wrote in her diary, "It is difficult to look in the eyes of a Korean student, who has only just been struck in the temple by two juvenile thugs... they waved 'Sieg Heil' towards the tram and ran off."

Baburova was active in the anarchist environmentalist movement. She participated in the activities of ecological camps, in social fora, including the Fifth European Social Forum in Malmö 2008, organised the 'Anti-capitalism 2008' festival, demonstrated widely, and was involved in anti-fascist activities more generally.

In July 2008, Baburova participated in a demonstration against the felling of the Khimki Forest. For her involvement in another protest against the eviction of former pork factory workers from the Moscow factory, 'Smena' and impoverished CIS immigrants she would spend a night in prison. The day before her murder, Anastasia appeared at the anarcho-communist unity event 'Autonomous Action'. Earlier she had written an article on behalf of the journal 'Avtonom'.

Throughout 2008, Anastasia Baburova worked on the editorial team of the Russian newspaper, Izvestia, and had had dozens of articles published by both Izvestia and Financial News, particularly on finance. Beginning in October 2008, she investigated (as a freelance-journalist) Russian neo-Nazi groups for Novaya Gazeta. In December 2008, she resigned from this post over the political course of the newspaper, which, according to the British weekly newspaper The Economist, may be characterised by "nationalism, spinelessness and cynicism".

== Death and investigation ==
At first it was reported that Baburova had been wounded on Prechistenka street in an attempt to detain Markelov's killer, but later Russian law enforcement authorities declared that Baburova was shot in the back of the head. Baburova died a few hours after the attack at a Moscow hospital. Baburova became the fourth Novaya Gazeta journalist to be killed since 2000.

Then President of Ukraine Viktor Yushchenko sent her parents a condolence telegram on 23 January 2009. Russian president Dmitry Medvedev gave his condolences 6 days later. On 26 January 2009, Baburova was buried in the central city cemetery of her home town of Sevastopol.

According to Russian military analyst Pavel Felgenhauer, the details of the murder indicate involvement of Russian state security services. In November 2009, Russian authorities declared the end of the criminal investigation. The murder suspects were 29-year-old Nikita Tikhonov and his girlfriend, 24-year-old Eugenia Khasis, members of a radical neo-Nazi nationalistic group. According to investigators, Tikhonov was the one who committed the murder, while Khasis reported to him, by cell phone, the movements of Markelov and Baburova right before the assault. The motive of the murder was revenge for Markelov's prior work as a lawyer in the interests of anti-Russian activists. The murder suspects were arrested, and were reported to have confessed. In May 2011, Tikhonov was sentenced to life imprisonment, and Khasis was sentenced to 18 years in prison.
