= Racism in Russia =

Racism in Russia mainly appears in the form of negative attitudes towards non-ethnic Russian citizens, immigrants or tourists and negative actions against them by some Russians. Traditionally, Russian racism includes antisemitism and Tatarophobia, as well as hostility towards the various peoples of the Caucasus, Central Asia, East Asia, South Asia and Africa.

According to the United Nations, Russia's immigrant population is the world's fifth-largest, numbering over 9.1 million. Due to the country's declining population, low birth rates, and high death rates of ethnic Russians, the Russian government has tried to increase immigration to the country in the last decade. This has led to the increase of millions of migrants into Russia, mainly from post-Soviet states, including many who migrated illegally and remain undocumented.

Under serious police pressure, the number of racist acts started to decline in Russia from 2009. In 2016, it was reported that Russia had seen an “impressive" decrease in hate crimes.

== Xenophobia ==
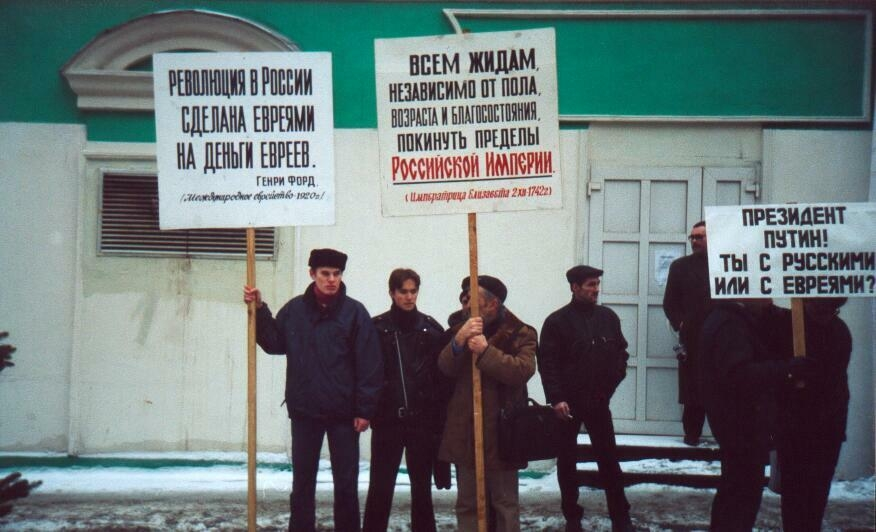
An antisemitic demonstration in Russia, with one of the posters exclaiming: "President Putin, are you with the Russians or with the Jews?"

In the late 19th century, especially after nationalistic uprisings occurred in Poland, the government expressed xenophobia in its hostility towards ethnic minorities which did not speak Russian. The government decided to reduce the use of other languages, and it insisted that minorities which did not speak Russian should be Russified.

By the beginning of the 20th century, most European Jews lived in the so-called Pale of Settlement, the Western frontier of the Russian Empire which generally consisted of the modern-day countries of Poland, Lithuania, Belarus and neighboring regions. Many pogroms accompanied the Revolution of 1917 and the ensuing civil war, an estimated 70,000 to 250,000 Jewish civilians were killed in atrocities which were committed throughout the former Russian Empire; the number of Jewish orphans exceeded 300,000.

In the 2000s, tens of thousands of people joined neo-Nazi groups inside Russia. Racism against both the Russian citizens (peoples of the Caucasus, Indigenous peoples of Siberia and Russian Far East, etc.) and non-Russian citizens of Africans, Central Asians, South Asians (Indians, Pakistanis, Bangladeshis, Srilankans), East Asians (Vietnamese, Chinese, etc.) and Europeans (Ukrainians, etc.) is a significant problem.

In 2016, Radio Free Europe/Radio Liberty reported that "Researchers who track xenophobia in Russia have recorded an "impressive" decrease in hate crimes because the authorities appear to have stepped up pressure on far-right groups".

Using information which was collected during surveys which were conducted in 1996, 2004, and 2012, Hannah S. Chapman, et al. reports a steady increase in Russians' negative attitudes towards seven outgroups. Muscovites especially became more xenophobic.

== Public sentiments and politics ==
Number of racist attacks victims according to SOVA Center
Year	Deaths	Injuries
2004	46	208
2005	47	461
2006	62	564
2007	85	605
2008	109	486
2009	84	434
2010	38	377
2011	20	130
2012	18	171
2013	20	173
2014	19	103
2015	9	68
2016	7	69
2017	4	64
2018	4	52
Total	572	3965
Total	4537	

Survey by Levada Center in which participants are asked if they agree with the phrase "Russia for Russians."

In 2006, Amnesty International reported that racism in Russia was "out of control." Russia also has one of the highest immigration rates in Eastern Europe.

Between 2004 and 2008, there were more than 350 racist murders, and Verkhovsky, the leader of the anti-racist SOVA organization, estimated that around 50% of Russians thought that ethnic minorities should be expelled from their region. Vladimir Putin meanwhile was deeply critical of the view that Russia should be "for ethnic Russians", citing the need to maintain harmony in a multiethnic federation. Western commentators have noted that during this period, racist and ultranationalist groups may have been the most significant right-wing opposition to Putin's government.

On 20 April 2011, Konstantin Poltoranin, spokesman for Federal Migratory Service, was fired after saying the "survival of the white race was at stake."

On 24 October 2013, speaking during the Poedinok programme on the Russia 1 television channel, the leader of Russia's extreme nationalist Liberal Democratic Party of Russia, Vladimir Zhirinovsky, known for his headline-grabbing outbursts, called for imposing limits on the birth rate in the Muslim-dominated North Caucasus region of Russia, and restricting the movement of people from that region across the country. These outbursts occurred shortly after the terrorist attack in Volgograd, which left several Russians dead. Zhirinovsky later apologized for his words. During the programme, there was a live population poll conducted via text messaging and the internet. Zhirinovsky won that popular vote, with over 140 thousand Russians voting in favour of him. Some Russian nationalists believe the best way to stop the uptick in Muslim migration is by using oppressive tactics to "stem the tide". In 2006, in the town of Kondopoga, Karelian republic, a brawl in a café involving Chechen migrants and local Russians turned into a massive riot that lasted for several days.

=== Publishers and periodicals ===
Literature of a neopagan, racist, antisemitic, and anti-Christian nature is published by the Moscow publishing house Russkaya Pravda, officially registered in 1994, founded by the neopagan publicist Alexander Aratov (Ogneved). The publishing house aims to "publish and distribute literature on Aryan-Slavic-Russian issues." Mainly, it publishes the newspaper Russkaya Pravda. The publishers of Russkaya Pravda advertised Alexey Dobrovolsky (Dobroslav), one of the founders of Russian neopaganism.

In 1997, Valery Yemelyanov, one of the founders of Russian neopaganism, along with a small number of followers, joined Aratov's small movement and became editor-in-chief of the Russkaya Pravda newspaper. Since 1997, the Russkaya Pravda publishing house, represented by Aratov, has formed, together with the Kaluga Slavic community and other groups, the core of the large neopagan association SSO SRV. In the fall of 2001, some former leaders of the People's National Party and Russian National Unity, as well as the editors of the Russkaya Pravda newspaper, united to create the National Power Party of Russia. Historian Victor Schnirelmann characterizes the publishing house and the newspaper Russkaya Pravda as antisemitic.

The Belye Alvy publishing house publishes racist literature. In St. Petersburg, the books of the Belye Alvy publishing house were distributed by the newspaper Za Russkoye Delo. St. Petersburg human rights activists Ruslan Linkov and Yuri Vdovin have repeatedly appealed to the authorities with a demand to check the facts of the publication of "all kinds of Nazi literature" by the publishing house Belye Alvy.

In 1999, Vladimir Avdeyev (the creator of the doctrine of "racology" about the superiority of the Nordic race) started a series of books called the "Library of Racial Thought" by the Belye Alvy publishing house, under the heading of which he published the works of Russian racial theorists and classics of Western racial theory; in particular, he republished well-known racist writings of the beginning of the 20th century, such as Ludwig Woltmann's Political Anthropology and the works of Hans F. K. Günther, a propagandist of racial anthropology during the Nazi period.

The founder of the band DK, Sergei Zharikov, wrote about the unconditionally pagan nature of rock culture and supported the national idea and messianism. Referencing the works of academician Boris Rybakov, he argued that the pagan ideology is most suitable for the struggle for the independence of the Russian land. Zharikov became the publisher of the neo-Nazi magazine Attack, which pays great attention to neopagan ideas.

Over the years, the fascist newspaper Russian Revansh, the neo-Nazi newspaper Zemshchina, and the racist magazine Heritage of Ancestors have been published. The Knizhny Mir publishing house disseminates racial ideas.

== Targeted groups ==
=== Africans ===
Official attitudes towards African people were nominally neutral during the Soviet Union, because of its internationalist agenda. As a part of its support of decolonization of Africa, the Soviet Union offered free education for selected citizens of African states. However, once in the Soviet Union, these students experienced everyday racism directed at them from all classes of society. In 1963, Moscow was the site of spontaneous protests which saw African students protest the murder of a black man, who was killed by a family of the Russian woman he was dating.

In 2006, some exchange students claimed that "monkey" insults were so frequent that students ceased reporting them.

In 2010, Jean Sagbo became the first black man in Russia to be elected to government. He is a municipal councillor in the village of Novozavidovo, 100 kilometres (62 mi) north of Moscow.

In 2013, Member of Duma Irina Rodnina publicly posted a picture showing Obama with a banana on Twitter.

A Tatar owned supermarket in Tatarstan sold calendars with images of American president Obama depicted as a monkey and initially refused to apologize for selling the calendar. They were then forced to issue an apology later.

In mid-2016, after tensions rose between the US and Russia, a Tatarstan ice cream factory produced "Obamka" (little Obama) ice cream with packaging showing a black child wearing an earring; the move was seen as an illustration of both anti-Americanism in Russia and enduring, Soviet-era racism in the country. The company, which stated that the ice cream was not intended to be political, halted production of the line shortly after the controversy arose.

=== Crimean Tatars ===
Discrimination against Crimean Tatars was state-enforced during the Soviet era through the racially based special settlement system, which confined the deported Crimean Tatar nation in small perimeters within Central Asia and the Mari ASSR and deprived them of a variety of civil liberties that other peoples had. While no longer officially a state-mandated institution, prejudice and negative attitudes against Crimean Tatars remain pervasive throughout government and society; a notable example being when Russian consul Vladimir Andreev demanded that none of the invited Russian citizens attend the debut of Haytarma, a film about Crimean Tatar twice Hero of the Soviet Union Amet-khan Sultan, claiming that the film could not possibly be accurate because it was directed by a Crimean Tatar.

=== Peoples of the Caucasus ===
In Russia, the word "Caucasian" is a collective term referring to anyone descended from the native ethnic groups of the Caucasus. In Russian slang, Peoples of the Caucasus are called black; this name-calling comes from their relatively darker features. Since the dissolution of the Soviet Union, the rise of the Muslim population in Russia and the Second Chechen War, many Russian radical nationalists have associated Islam and Muslims with terrorism and domestic crimes. In 2010 Julia Ioffe wrote that this was similar to stereotyping faced by Italian Americans in historical eras.

On 21 April 2001, there was a pogrom in a market in Moscow's Yasenevo District against merchants from the Caucasus. Ethnically motivated attacks against Armenians in Russia have grown so common that the president of Armenia, Robert Kocharyan, raised the issue with high-ranking Russian officials. In September 2006, major ethnic tensions between Russians and Caucasians took place in Kondopoga. In 2006, the crisis in Georgia–Russia relations resulted in the deportation of Georgians from Russia. The Russian side explained the process as law enforcement towards illegal immigrants, whereas the Georgian government accused Russia of ethnic cleansing. The European Court of Human Rights concluded that the detention and collective expulsion of Georgian nationals in 2006 violated the European Convention of Human Rights and ruled, in 2019, that Russia had to pay 10 million Euros in compensation.

In December 2010, there was a massive outbreak of hostility towards Caucasians, culminating in nationalist protests at Manezhnaya Square in Moscow and in other cities. The trigger was the murder of Egor Sviridov, a Russian association football fan, in a street fight on 6 December. On 11 December, thousands of nationalist rioters, outside the Moscow Kremlin building, screamed racist phrases, cried for a "Russia for Russians" and a "Moscow for Muscovites," attacked Caucasians and other minority groups who passed by, and some – including children as young as fourteen – made the Nazi salute. The next day, a similar riot was held in Rostov-on-Don, and afterwards, the city's government banned Caucasians from performing Lezginka, their traditional dance, in the city. Later, the police chief in Moscow said that civil liberties were a hindrance in security and that migration should be restricted. Vladimir Kvachkov, a major Russian nationalist leader of the organization People's Liberation Front of Russia (which says its major goal is to "free" Russia from Caucasian and Hebrew "occupiers"), made the following statement: "We Russian nationalists, the initiators of the people's front, we are telling you that the events of 11 December are the beginning of the revolutionary changes in Russia, the first outbursts of the approaching Russian revolution... You are the ones who can participate in it."

=== People of Central Asia ===
In 2016, Kyrgyzstan's President Almazbek Atambayev urged Russians to show respect to his countrymen after an assault on two migrants in Moscow. Racial discrimination of work-migrants from Central Asians (called gastarbeiters, гастарбайтеры) became a systematic norm after the fall of the Soviet Union.

=== Jews ===
On 11 January 2006, Alexander Koptsev burst into Bolshaya Bronnaya Synagogue in Moscow and stabbed eight people with a knife. In March, he was sentenced to 13 years in prison. In 2008, allegations of blood libel appeared in posters in Novosibirsk. The Federation of Jewish Communities of Russia expressed their concern about a rising number of attacks targeting Jews, calling it part of "a recent surge in anti-Semitic manifestations" in Russia.

In 2019, Ilya Yablokov wrote that many Russians were keen on antisemitic conspiracy theories in 1990s but it declined after 2000 and many high-ranking officials were forced to apologize for the antisemitic behavior.

The 2019 Pew Research poll found that 18% of Russians held unfavorable views of Jews, dropping from 34% in 2009.

=== Romani ===
Romani people in Russia face especially harsh discrimination and mistreatment, including the segregation of Romani children in schools and police "special operations" racially profiling them.

=== Sámi people ===
In July, 2024, the Russian government labelled dozens of Indigenous organizations as extremist organizations, including some Sámi organizations. Russian repression of Sámi activists caused some to hide their Sámi identity or flee to the Nordic countries.

=== Yakuts ===
In October 2007 Sergey Nikolaev, a 46-year-old man from the Sakha (Yakutia) Republic, was brutally murdered by a group of racist youths after a soccer match who were targeting people who did not look like an ethnic Russian. Nikolaev, with a Eurasian complexion, lost his life at the scene. Despite numerous witnesses, no one intervened or alerted the police for 30 minutes. Russian society grapples with the escalating violence fueled by ethnic hatred.

=== Vietnamese ===
In October 2004 Russian skinheads stabbed and beat a Vietnamese student named Vu Anh Tuan, killing him. Vu Anh Tuan was 20 years old when he was killed in St. Petersburg. In October 2006 the 17 skinheads who were on trial for his murder were acquitted by a court.

A protest was held by 100 Vietnamese against the murder of Vu Anh Tuan, and a protestor said "We came to study in this country, which we thought was a friend of Vietnam. We do not have drunken fights, we do not steal, we do not sell drugs and we have the right to protection from bandits".

In Moscow on 25 December 2004 a crowd of people used clubs and knives to attack 2 Vietnamese students at the Moscow Energy Institute, Nguyen Tuan Anh and Nguyen Hoang Anh and they suffered severe injuries and were hospitalized.

In 2005 in Moscow, three Russians stabbed a 45-year-old Vietnamese man named Quan to death.

In Moscow on Festivalnaya Street in 2008 a group of young men stabbed a 35-year-old Vietnamese woman, who later died of her wounds.

On 9 January 2009 a group of strangers in Moscow stabbed a Vietnamese student named Tang Quoc Binh who was 21 years old and the wounds were fatal resulting in his death on 10 January.

Amid hostility towards migrant workers, around 600 Vietnamese were rounded up in Moscow and placed in tents while waiting to be deported from Russia in August 2013.

=== Non-ethnic Russians ===
In Moscow's challenging housing market, discrimination against ethnic minorities is prevalent, despite laws prohibiting such practices. A data journalism project, Robustory, analyzed 35,796 property listings on Cian.ru in April 2017, revealing that approximately 16 percent, or 5,780 ads, discriminated based on ethnicity or nationality. The Severny district emerged as the most discriminatory, with 58 percent of landlords specifying Slavic origins for tenants.

== Association football ==
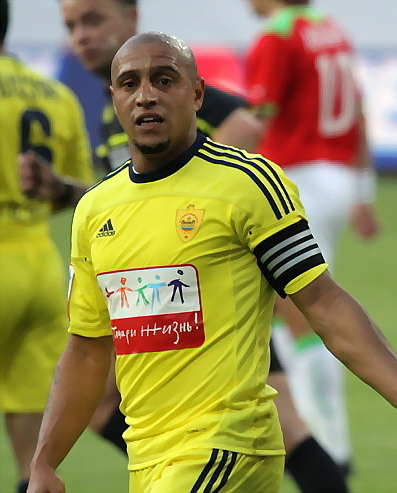
Playing for a Russian team, Roberto Carlos was twice faced with racial abuse on the field.

After it was announced that Russia will host 2018 FIFA World Cup, a head of UEFA FARE Monitoring Centre, Dr. Rafał Pankowski, accused the Russian Football Union of downplaying racist chants in stadiums, saying: "Nazi slogans are common in many Russian stadiums. Matches are often interrupted with racist chants aimed at black players." More than 100 incidents took place 2012–2014.

Cameroonian player André Amougou constantly suffered racism while playing for Lokomotiv Moscow. As Zenit Saint Petersburg kicked off their 2006/2007 Russian Premier League campaign against visitors Saturn Moscow Oblast, Brazilian footballer Antônio Géder was received with a chorus of monkey chants at Petrovsky Stadium. In March 2008, black players of French side Marseille — including André Ayew, Charles Kaboré and Ronald Zubar — were targeted by ultras of Zenit Saint Petersburg. Zenit ultras were later warned by police in Manchester not to repeat their behaviour ahead of the 2008 UEFA Cup Final. Zenit's coach Dick Advocaat revealed that when they attempted to sign Mathieu Valbuena, a Frenchman, many fans asked "Is he a negro?" Also Serge Branco, who played for Krylia Sovetov Samara, accused Zenit's staff of racism, saying: "Each time I play in St Petersburg I have to listen to racist insults from the stands. Zenit bosses do not do anything about it which makes me think they are racists too." On 20 August 2010, Peter Odemwingie of Lokomotiv Moscow signed a 3-year contract with Premier League team West Bromwich Albion. Later, photographs showed Lokomotiv Moscow fans celebrating the sale of Odemwingie through the use of racist banners, including the image of a banana with the text "Thanks West Brom".

On 21 March 2011, during a game away at Zenit Saint Petersburg, a banana was held by one of the fans near Roberto Carlos of Russian Premier League club Anzhi Makhachkala as the footballer was taking part in a flag-raising ceremony. In June, in a match away at Krylia Sovetov Samara, Roberto Carlos received a pass from the goalkeeper and was about to pass it when a banana was thrown onto the pitch, landing nearby. The 38-year-old Brazilian picked it up and threw it by the sidelines, walking off the field before the final whistle and raising two fingers at the stands, indicating this was the second such incident.

Lokomotiv Moscow was involved in another incident on 18 March 2012, when a banana was thrown at Anzhi Makhachkala defender Christopher Samba during a match at the Lokomotiv Stadium.

In October 2013, during the second half of the match, between Manchester City and PFC CSKA Moscow, Yaya Touré, a star midfielder for City from Ivory Coast, walked up to the referee, Ovidiu Hategan, and angrily pointed at CSKA fans making monkey chants and shouting abuse toward him and his black teammates. The game continued and, according to Touré, so did the abuse.

== Environmental racism ==
Environmental racism is a form of institutional racism, which has led to the disproportionate disposal of hazardous waste in communities of colour in Russia. It also results in indigenous people disproportionately bearing the environmental burdens of mining, and oil or gas extraction. In Russia, there are 47 officially recognized indigenous groups, who have had some rights to consultation and participation under Russian law since 1999. However, these guarantees have steadily eroded with the re-centralization of state control, and several indigenous autonomous territories have been abolished since the 1990s.

Russia, an International Labor Organization member, has not ratified ILO 69, an agreement that explicitly asserts the right to self-determination for all indigenous peoples. This allows the Russian Federation to continue to deny Indigenous peoples' control over their land and resources. Russia is also a member of the United Nations, which recognizes indigenous peoples of classically colonized lands, but is somewhat vague about indigenous minorities who are not separated from their colonizers by an ocean. This is one of the arguments Russia uses to justify not complying with UN treaties in the case of the indigenous peoples of Siberia.

Environmental racism in Russia also affects Romani people and migrant workers.

== Notable hate crimes ==
On 9 February 2004, a group of neo-Nazi skinheads stabbed a nine-year-old Tajik girl, Khursheda Sultanova, to death in Saint Petersburg. In 2006, the Saint Petersburg Agency for Journalistic Investigations revealed the fact that the suspected perpetrators of the hate crime were members of the "Mad Crowd" gang.

On 14 June 2011, the Saint Petersburg City Court sentenced 12 members of the gang which was led by Alexei Voevodin and Artyom Prokhorenko for their roles in dozens of racist attacks.

On 15 December 2008, Artur Ryno and Pavel Skachevsky were sentenced to penal labour for 10 years each for the murder of 19 foreigners. They were placed on the list of people banned from entering the United Kingdom, remaining the only Russians on the list. The reason given is that they are "Leaders of a violent gang that beat migrants and posted films of their attacks on the internet. Considered to be engaging in unacceptable behaviour by fomenting serious criminal activity and seeking to provoke others to serious criminal acts." A judge who conducted the trial, Eduard Chuvashov, was gunned down on 12 April 2010, four days after he added two years to the 20-year prison sentence of a member of their gang.

=== Murder of anti-fascist activists ===
- On 19 June 2004, Nikolai Girenko, a prominent ethnologist and a prominent adviser in 15 ethnic hate crimes trials, was shot to death in his Saint Petersburg apartment. On 14 June 2011, members of neo-Nazi gang Mad Crowd were sentenced to jail for a number of killings including Girenko.
- On 13 November 2005, the murder of Timur Kacharava, a Russian anti-fascist of Georgian descent, took place. On 7 August 2007, Alexander Shabalin was sentenced to 12 years in prison for his murder.
- On 19 January 2009, while leaving a news conference, a human rights lawyer and journalist Stanislav Markelov was gunned down in Moscow. Anastasia Baburova, a journalist for Novaya Gazeta who tried to come to Markelov's assistance, was also shot and killed in the attack. On 6 May 2011, the court sentenced two radical nationalists, Nikita Tikhonov and his girlfriend Yevgenia Khasis, to life imprisonment and 18 years in prison, respectively.
- On 16 November 2009, Ivan Khutorskoy, former punk singer and head of security for anti-fascist shows, was killed in a suburb of Moscow. He was known for organizing self-defense classes for anti-fascist individuals and he was also known for providing security at press conferences which were held by Stanislav Markelov.

=== Cherkizovsky Market bombing ===
On 21 August 2006, a home-made bomb exploded in Moscow at the Cherkizovsky Market, which is frequented by foreign merchants. On 15 May 2008, eight people of Russian radical nationalist organization Spas were found guilty for their roles in the attack that left 14 dead. Semyon Charny from the Moscow Bureau for Human Rights says: "The fact that this case found its way to court, and the example of people sentenced to life for the Cherkizovo market blast shows that we are moving in the right direction – but there's still a lot to do."

=== Execution of a Tajik and a Dagestani ===
Execution of a Tajik and a Dagestani (Russian: Казнь таджика и дагестанца, romanized: Kazn' tadzhika i dagestantsa) is a video clip that was distributed in the Russian Internet segment in August 2007, showing the beheading of a Russian citizen of Dagestani origin and the shooting of a Tajik immigrant by Russian neo-nazis.

The video sparked active discussions in the Russian media. On 17 March 2008, the District Court of Novgorod ruled the video as extremist, and banned its distribution in the Russian Federation.

The video was posted on behalf of the National Socialist Party of Rus' (Russian: Национал-социалистической партии Руси) on the personal livejournal blog of Adygean college student Viktor Milnikov. After a few days, he was arrested and later sentenced to one year of corrective labour by Maykop court.

On 5 June 2008, scenes of decapitation on video were identified as authentic by the Russian Investigation Committee. On the same day, one of the victims on the footage was identified by his relatives as Shamil Odamanov, a native of Dagestan.

== See also ==
- Anti-Romani sentiment
- Anti-Russian sentiment
- Antisemitism by country
- Antisemitism in Europe
- Anti-Slavic sentiment
- Environmental racism in Europe
- Far-right politics in Russia
- Fascism in Europe
- History of the Jews in Europe
- History of the Jews in Russia
- Human rights in Europe
- Human rights in Russia
- LGBT rights in Europe
- LGBT rights in Russia
- Nerus (political slur)
- Putinism
- Racism by country
- Racism in Europe
- Radical right (Europe)
- Ruscism
- Russia for Russians
- Russian nationalism
- SOVA Center

== Sources ==
- "Russian Federation" (PDF). Convention on the Elimination of All Forms of Racial Discrimination. United Nations. 20 August 2008.
- "Third report on the Russian Federation" (PDF). European Commission against Racism and Intolerance. Strasbourg: Council of Europe. 16 May 2006. Archived from the original (PDF) on 6 October 2011.
- "Russian Federation: Violent racism out of control" (PDF). Amnesty International. 3 May 2006.
- Schnirelmann, Victor (2007b). ""The chain dog of the race": couch racology as a defender of the "white man"". SOVA Center (Октябрь). Moscow.
- ——— (2012). Russian Rodnoverie: Neo-Paganism and Nationalism in Modern Russia (in Russian). Moscow: Biblical and Theological Institute of St. Andrew the Apostle. ISBN 978-5-89647-291-9.
- ——— (2015). Russian Academy of Sciences, Institute of Anthropology and Ethnography (ed.). Aryan myth in the modern world. Moscow: New Literary Review. ISBN 978-5-4448-0279-3. ISSN 1815-7912.
