= Territory of Traditional Natural Resource Use =

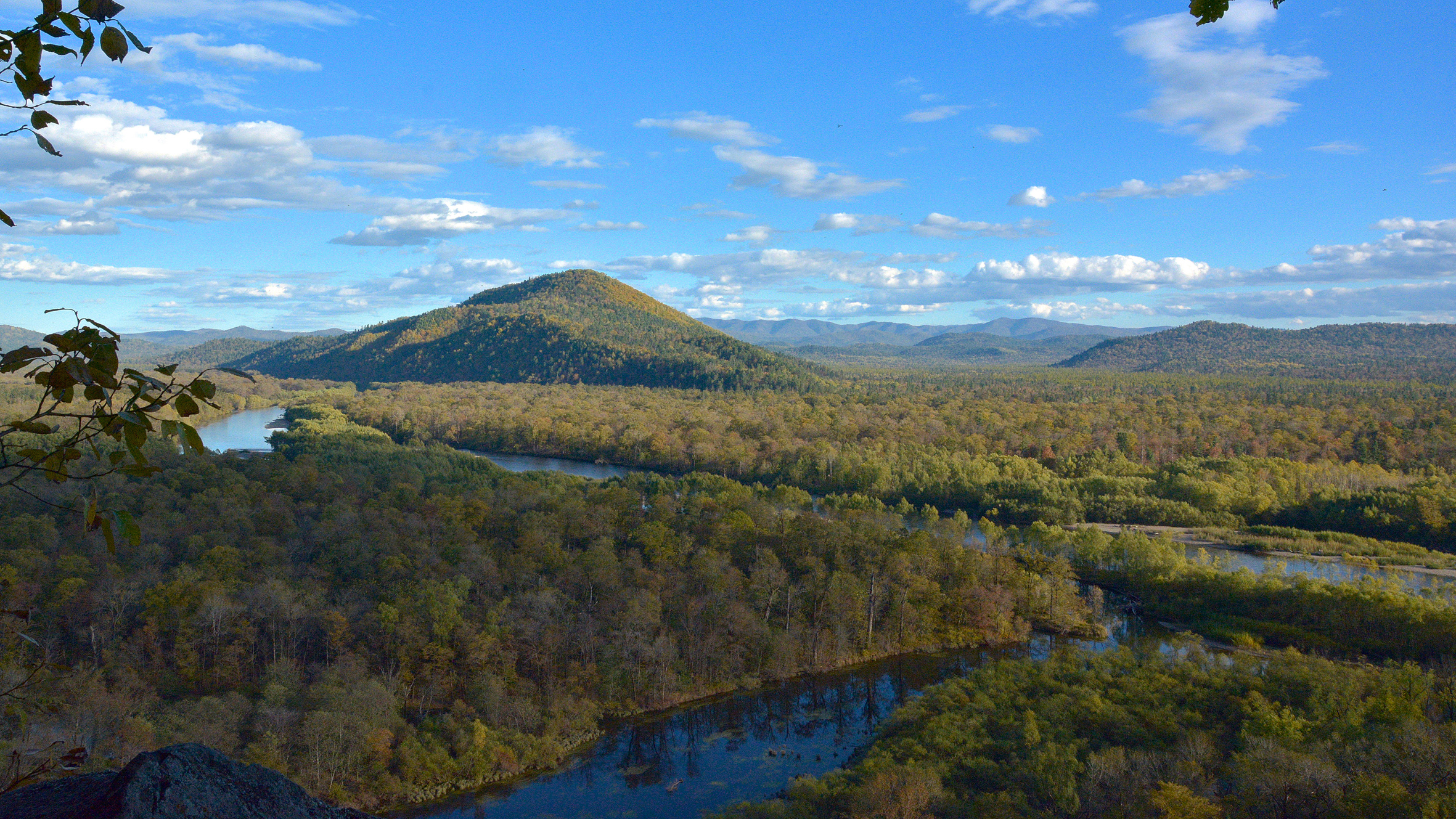
Territory of Traditional Natural Resource Use in Pozharsky District, Primorsky Krai

Territory of Traditional Natural Resource Use, TTNRU (Russian: территория традиционного природопользования, ТТП, romanized: Territoriya traditsionnogo prirodopol'zovaniya, TTP) is a type of land use and protected areas in Russia, established for protection of the traditional way of life of small-numbered Indigenous peoples of Russia that live in Siberia and Russian Far East. Introduced on April 22 1992, they are subject to the Russian federal law of May 7, 2001 (amended on May 26, 2007).

== See also ==
- Indigenous Protected Areas
- Community Conservation Areas
- Law on Guarantees of the Rights of Indigenous Small-Numbered Peoples of the Russian Federation
