= Antisemitism in Russia =

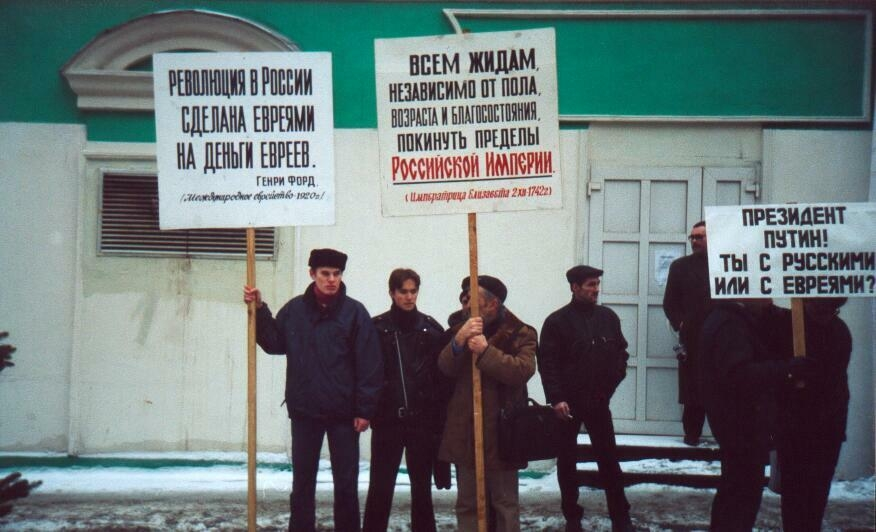
2003 antisemitic demonstration in Russia, with posters claiming "President Putin! Are you with the Russians or the Jews?".

Antisemitism in Russia is expressed in acts of hostility against Jews in Russia and the promotion of antisemitic views in the Russian Federation.

== History ==
The collapse of the USSR and the economic crisis that followed, the massive impoverishment of large sections of the population, the rapid enrichment of a small group of people and the criticism of the previously dominant ideology contributed to widespread antisemitic sentiment in Russia.

During the 1990s, antisemitism was an enduring undercurrent and source of anxiety, its presence affirmed by easily accessible antisemitic newspapers and other publications, street or popular antisemitism. Mass publication of antisemitic materials in the media began, including books such as Adolf Hitler's Mein Kampf, The Protocols of the Elders of Zion, Douglas Reed's The Dispute about Zion, The Prince of this World, The Protocols of the Soviet Wise Men by Grigory Klimov, Dezionization by Valery Yemelyanov, and others.

The number of antisemitic incidents rose sharply after the 1998 Russian financial crisis, the devaluation of the ruble and the ensuing economic hardships affecting a broad segment of the general population.

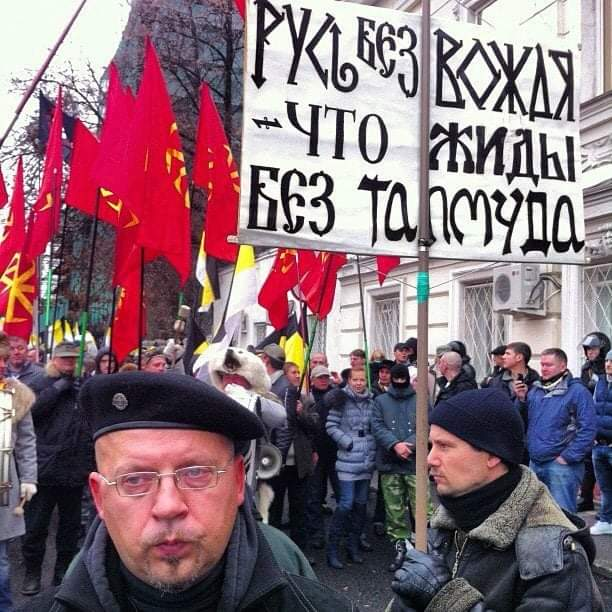
"Russian March" in 2012 in Moscow. An anti-Semitic poster against the background of flags with a nationalist and neopagan symbol "Kolovrat". The poster reads: "Rus' without a Vozhd is like zhyds without a Talmud."

High-profile antisemitic voices have included several Russian Communist public figures such as Nikolai Kondratenko, a former governor of Krasnodar Krai. He claimed the Kremlin was controlled by Jews and Zionists, to blame for the demise of the Soviet Communist Party, the Chechen conflict and other problems. He formed an alliance with local Cossacks and was said to believe that an international Jewish conspiracy rules the world. Other high-profile figures have included deputies of the State Duma from the Communist Party of the Russian Federation, such as Albert Makashov and Viktor Ilyukhin. In November 1998, the State Duma considered and rejected a measure to denounce Makashov. In late December 1998, Gennady Zyuganov, leader of the Russian Communist Party, was under pressure to publicly censure the bigoted statements of his comrades and did indeed denounce antisemitism, but at the same time labeled Zionism "a blood relative of fascism".

The ideology of Russian neo-Nazism is closely connected with the ideology of Slavic neopaganism (Rodnoverie). In a number of cases, there are also organizational ties between neo-Nazis and neopagans. One of the founders of Russian neo-paganism, the former Soviet dissident Alexey Dobrovolsky (pagan name – Dobroslav) shared the ideas of neo-Nazism and transferred them to his neopagan teaching. According to the historian Roman Shizhensky, Dobrovolsky took the idea of the swastika from the work of the Nazi ideologist Herman Wirth (the first head of the Ahnenerbe).

The eight-beam "kolovrat", consisting of two swastikas superimposed on each other, is considered in Slavic neopaganism to be the ancient Slavic sign of the Sun. In 1996, Dobrovolsky declared it a symbol of an uncompromising "national liberation struggle" against the "Zhyd yoke". According to Dobrovolsky, the meaning of the "kolovrat" completely coincides with the meaning of the Nazi swastika (Hakenkreuz).

=== 2000-2010 ===
Since the mid-2000s, incorporation of antisemitic discourse into the platforms and speeches of nationalist political movements in Russia has been reported by human rights monitors in Russia as well as in the press. Antisemitic slogans and rhetoric in public demonstrations are frequently reported, most of them attributed to nationalist parties and political groups such as "Rusoslav Orthodox". The late member of the Duma Vladimir Zhirinovsky was known for antisemitic speeches.

In 2001, 98 United States Senators penned a letter to President Putin, expressing concern about popular antisemitism, radical extremists (such as former Klansman and Grand Wizard David Duke) in the Russian Federation.

In January 2005, a group of twenty members of the Duma published a statement accusing Jews of being anti-Christian, inhumane, committing ritual murder and that "the entire democratic world today is under the financial and political control of international Jewry".

On 9 June 2005, Russian Orthodox Patriarch Alexei II addressed the international conference of the Organization for Security and Co-operation in Europe in Cordoba, Spain, to declare that the Russian Orthodox Church shares concerns over "incidents of antisemitism, xenophobia and other forms of racism". He described antisemitism, as "one of the more radical expression of misanthropy and racism", and said its perpetrators included "public figures, publicists, and the leaders of radical organizations".

For example, at the 23 February 2006 rally celebrating the Soviet Defenders of the Fatherland Day, a yearly tribute to war veterans, according to the newspaper Kommersant, marchers flourished signs with messages including "Zhyds! Stop drinking Russian blood!", "White State!", and "Russian Government for Russia".

=== 2011-2021 ===
In May 2014, Russian President Vladimir Putin signed a law that made it illegal to deny the Holocaust and other Nazi war crimes. It also made the portrayal of Nazis as heroes a criminal offence.

In 2016, the president of the Russian Jewish Congress, Yuri Kanner, attributed the decline in antisemitism in part to the vanished state sponsorship of antisemitism after the Soviet collapse. He cited a report by the Anti-Defamation League that ranked Russia last in Eastern Europe in terms of antisemitism. At the same time, experts warn that worsening economic conditions may lead to the surge of xenophobia and antisemitism in particular.

In 2019, Ilya Yablogov wrote that many Russians were keen on antisemitic conspiracy theories in the 1990s, but it declined after 2000 and many high-ranking officials were forced to apologize for the antisemitic behavior.

The 2019 Pew Research poll found that 18% of Russians held unfavorable views of Jews, the number has dropped from 34% in 2009.

=== 2022-present ===
During the onset of the Russo–Ukrainian War since 2014, and especially since the Russian invasion of Ukraine in 2022, some Russian officials were accused of using antisemitism in the form of unsubstantiated Nazi comparisons in their hostile rhetoric against Ukraine.

Since 2020 there were between 1 and 5 convictions for vandalism motivated by antisemitism. There were no convictions for antisemitic violence in the same period according to SOVA Center data.

According to a report by Tel Aviv University antisemitic tropes were present in the official discourse. The report noted antisemitic rhetoric of Alexander Dugin.

The Anti-Defamation League reported a significant increase in antisemitic attitudes within Russian society in 2024. The percentage of respondents who agreed with the majority of antisemitic stereotypes rose from 26% in 2023 to 62% in 2024.

=== 2023 antisemitic unrest in the North Caucasus ===
Due to the Gaza war in October 2023, antisemitic demonstrations and attacks against Jewish institutions sharply increased in the North Caucasus region. A large crowd in the city of Khasavyurt besieged and raided a hotel, unsuccessfully searching for Jews. In addition, an arsonist set a Jewish cultural center in Nalchik on fire.

On 29 October, around 500 protesters stormed a hotel in Khasavyurt shouting that "Jews are not allowed here" after rumours had been spread that Israeli refugees were residing there. Russian police intervened and permit some of the protesters to enter the hotel to confirm that there were no Israeli nationals present. A sign was then placed at the entrance, declaring that "Entry for Israeli citizens is strictly prohibited."

On the same day, October 29, a mob stormed Uytash Airport after a plane had landed from Tel Aviv. The passengers could not leave the plane for several hours after the protesters surrounded the plane, with some people even climbing it. 20 people were injured, among them nine police officers, of whom two were injured seriously. 150 suspects were identified and the airport announced its closure until 6 November, but reopened the next day.

== Gallery ==
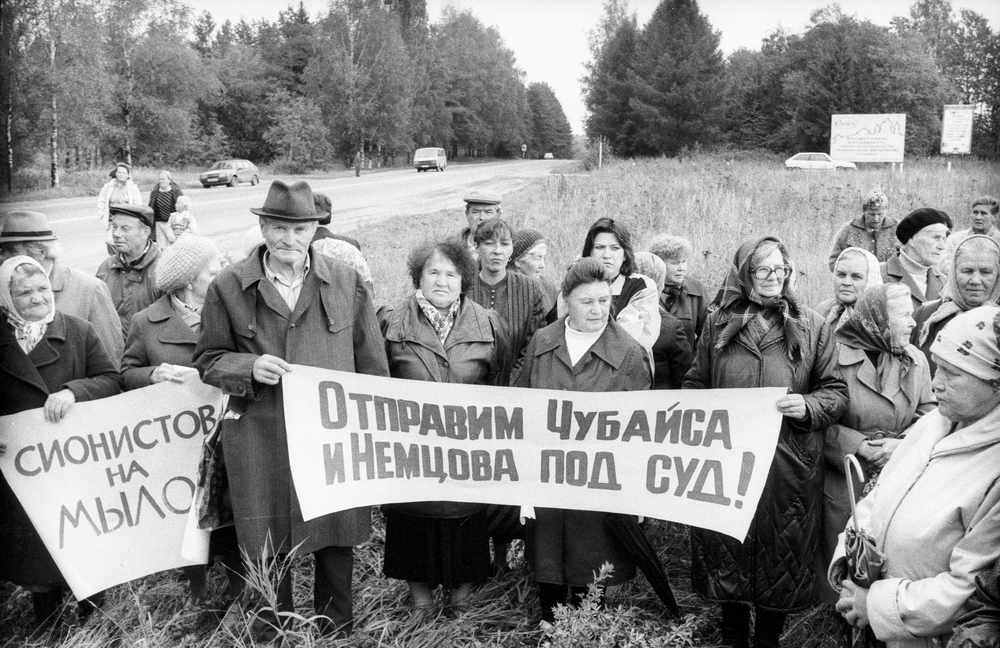
Demonstration around the time of the 1998 crisis. One sign calls for Nemtsov (murdered in 2015) and Chubais to be put on trial, and another says "Make soap of Zionists!"
Nemtsov and Chubais are both of Jewish origin.

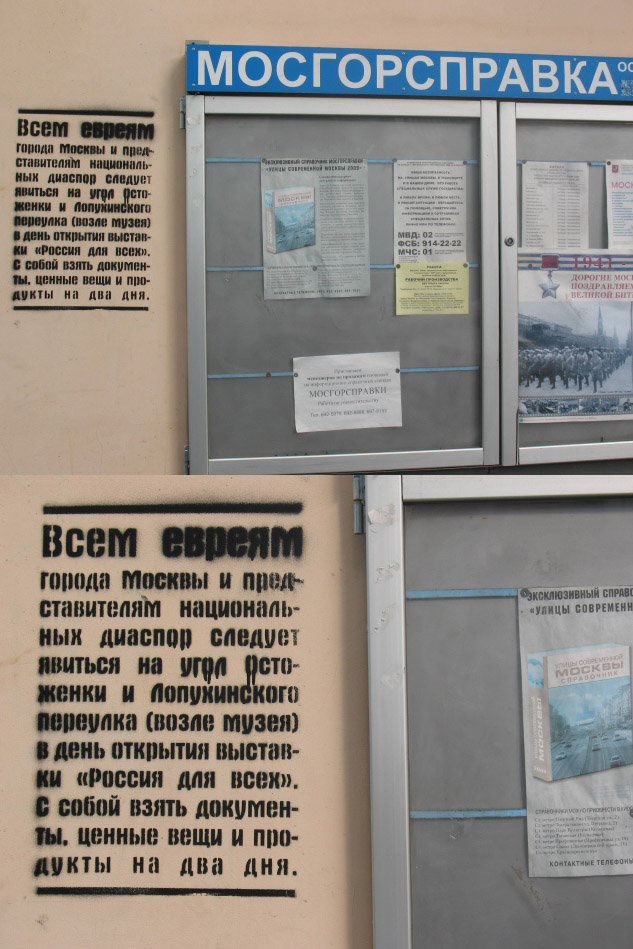
Graffiti in Moscow modeled after the leaflets distributed before the Babyn Yar massacre, 2013.
It calls on Jews to attend the opening of the exhibition "Russia for all" and bring with them documents, valuables, and food for two days.

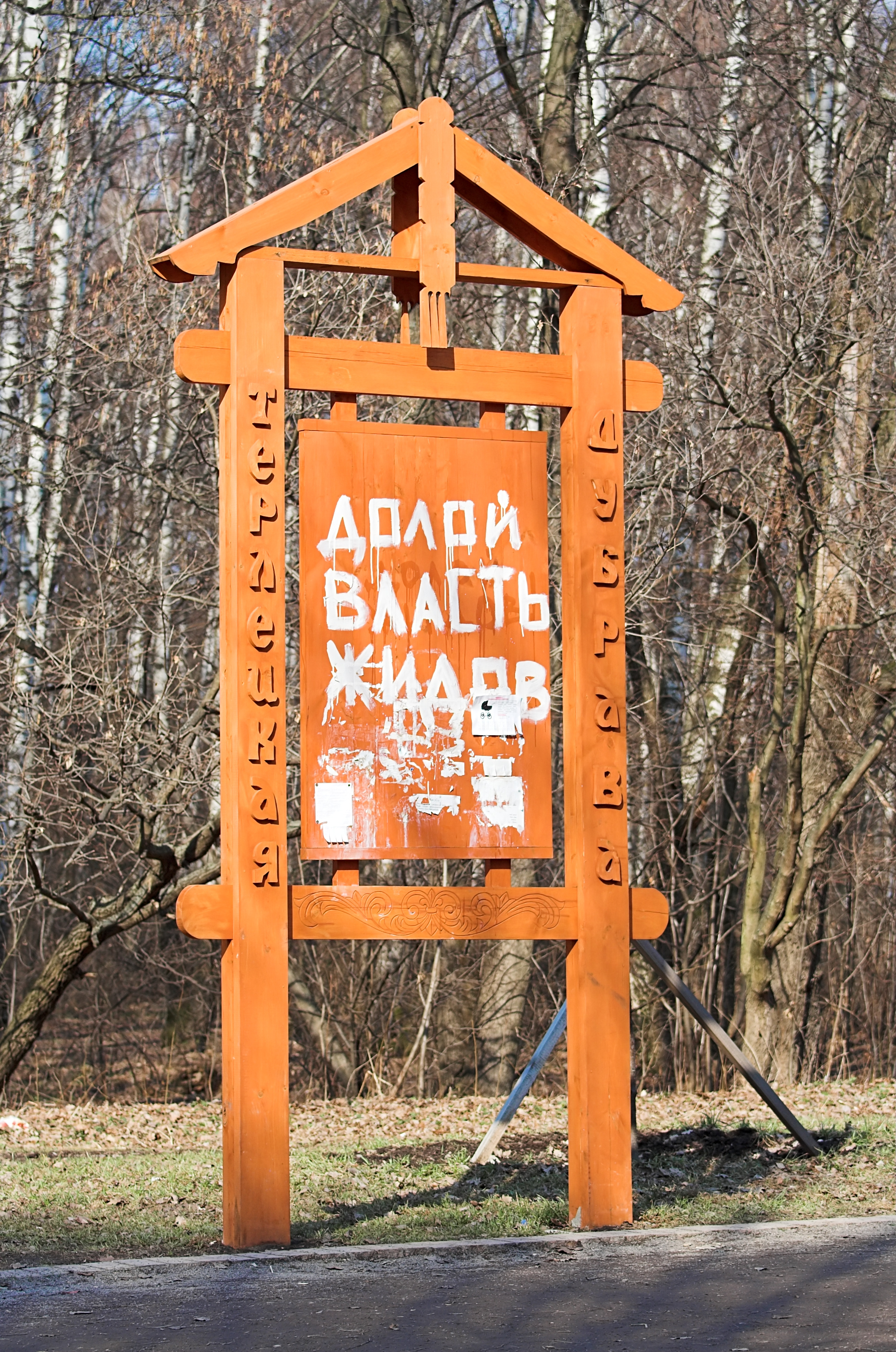
Graffiti in Terletsky park in Moscow, "Down with Zhyds' rule"

== See also ==
- History of the Jews in Russia
- Israel–Russia relations
- Antisemitism in the Russian Empire
- Antisemitism in the Soviet Union
- Racism in Russia
