= Kacharava =

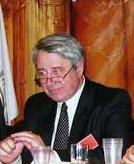
Vasil Kacharava in 2007

Kacharava (Georgian: კაჭარავა) is a Georgian surname. Notable people with the surname include:

- Anatoli Kacharava (1910–1982), Georgian sea captain and World War II veteran
- Davit Kacharava (born 1985), Georgian rugby union player
- Kakhaber Kacharava (born 1966), Georgian football coach and player
- Nika Kacharava (born 1994), Georgian footballer
- Timur Kacharava (1985–2005), Russian rock musician
- Vazha Kacharava (born 1937), Georgian volleyball player
