= Ryno-Skachevsky gang =

Russian murderers

The Ryno-Skachevsky gang was a Russian racist serial killer group composed of young men, seven of which in 2008 were convicted of beating and murdering people of ethnicities originated from Caucasus and Middle Asia. The band was headed by Artur Ryno and Pavel Skachevsky. In 2009 both of them were added to the list of individuals banned from entering the United Kingdom, in the group added to this list for the first time "for fostering extremism or hatred". The reason given was that he and Pavel Skachevsky were "Leaders of a violent gang that beat migrants and posted films of their attacks on the internet. Considered to be engaging in unacceptable behaviour by fomenting serious criminal activity and seeking to provoke others to serious criminal acts."

Ryno and Skachevsky were arrested in April 2007 following the murder of Armenian businessman Karen Abramian. Abramian was stabbed at the entrance to his Moscow apartment. It was established in court that the two were leaders of a teenage racist skinhead gang, members of which had randomly attacked and murdered 20 immigrant workers. Skachevsky and Ryno were sentenced to penal labour for 10 years each. They pleaded guilty to the murder of 37 individuals.

Ryno was convicted in nineteen of the killings. He was sentenced to the maximum of ten years of hard labour because he was a juvenile at the time.

== See also ==
- List of Russian serial killers
