= Bolshaya Bronnaya Synagogue stabbings =

2006 Stabbing incident at a Synagogue in Russia

- Location: Bolshaya Bronnaya Synagogue, Moscow, Russia
- Date: January 11, 2006; 20 years ago
- Weapon: Hunting knife
- Injuries: 8
- Perpetrator: Alexandr Koptsev

On January 11, 2006, Alexandr Koptsev burst into Bolshaya Bronnaya Synagogue in Moscow, Russia during evening prayers and stabbed eight people with a hunting knife before being wrestled to the ground by the congregation's leader, Rabbi Yitzhak Kogan, and his son Yosef Kogan. Four of those injured were in serious condition.

After the incident, Russia's Chief Rabbi Berl Lazar announced he was cutting short a visit to Israel to return to Moscow. Lazar stated that the attack was a symptom of a general climate of intolerance and xenophobia in Russia. Rabbi Kogan and his son were later awarded a medal of bravery by President Vladimir Putin.

On February 28, 2006, Koptsev pleaded not guilty of attempting to murder Jewish worshipers at a synagogue. The official charge against him was attempted murder "motivated by racial hatred", a charge that is rarely brought in Russian courts. Investigators found antisemitic and neo-pagan pamphlets in his home in addition to the Turner Diaries, but insist that he was acting alone. Koptsev admitted to adhering to Slavic neopaganism which he said was the genuine religion of the Slavs and convinced him of the need to "kill Jews".

He has been diagnosed with a schizophrenic disorder, but prosecutors said he was still fit to stand trial.

On March 27, 2006, Koptsev was sentenced to 13 years in prison and mandatory psychiatric treatment after being found guilty of attempted murder.

On April 4, 2006, Koptsev's lawyer, Vladimir Kirsanov, appealed to Russia's Supreme Court to have his client's sentence reduced, arguing he was mentally unstable, did not kill anyone, and did not cause any disabling injuries. Prosecution lawyers appealed to include the charge of inciting interethnic hatred, which was dropped by the court.
