= SOVA Center =

Russian NGO and think tank

- Сова
- Formation: 2002
- Headquarters: Moscow, Russia
- Official language: Russian
- Website: www.sova-center.ru/

The SOVA Center for Information and Analysis is a Moscow-based nongovernmental organization and think tank conducting sociological research primarily on nationalism and racism in post-Soviet Russia. Currently, SOVA devotes its monitoring, research and advocacy to three projects: Misuse of Anti-Extremism Legislation, Racism and Xenophobia, and Religion in Secular Society. SOVA publishes print reports in Russian and maintains a website updating readers in both Russian and English. Its reports are often cited by Western media sources including The New York Times and The Guardian.

In December 2016 Russia's Ministry of Justice added Sova Centre to the so-called list of "foreign agents".

In April 2023 the Moscow City Court ordered the SOVA Center to close over claims that it carried out its activities throughout Russia despite only being registered in Moscow. The order occurred during a crackdown on human rights and independent organizations in Russia following its invasion of Ukraine in 2022.

== History and Structure ==
Members of the Moscow Helsinki Group and the Russian research center "Panorama" established SOVA in October 2002. SOVA is based in Moscow and receives funding from several Western think tanks. The organization's director is Alexander Verkhovsky, and its deputy director was Galina Kozhevnikova until her death in March 2011.

SOVA's activities are devoted to the following projects:

=== Misuse of Anti-Extremism Legislation ===
Monitoring and reporting on the improper application of anti-extremism legislation in Russian courts. This project reports on trial decisions, wrongfully banned materials (texts and otherwise), improper punishments delivered in connection with legitimate or illegitimate extremism convictions, and other relevant topics. The Administrative and Criminal Code of the Russian Federation are central to its activities.

=== Racism and Xenophobia ===
Monitoring and reporting on the activities of radical right-wing and nationalist groups in Russia, and any counteraction by the Russian government. This project's reports cite numbers of individuals killed and injured in neo-Nazi or racist attacks, incidents of xenophobic vandalism, any demonstrations by ultra-right Russian groups and other relevant issues. It also keeps track of convictions and acquittals under charges relating to racism and xenophobia, with emphasis on cases that establish hatred as a motive.

=== Religion in Secular Society ===
Monitoring and reporting on problems of freedom of conscience in Russia. Data covers the regulation of religious organizations, preferential treatment given to select religious organizations and other forms of discrimination, religion in Russian military and secular educational institutions, and protection or lack thereof from defamation and attack. Such questions often intertwine with SOVA's other two projects.

=== Previous projects ===
- Countering Hate on the Internet
- Antisemitism
- Democracy Under Siege
- Hate Speech
- New Conservatism in Russia
- Resisting Radical Nationalism

Many problems addressed by discontinued projects are now covered under SOVA's three current projects.

== Policy and analysis ==
SOVA Center regularly publishes reports and recommendations that are widely used and cited by the OSCE, Amnesty International, Pulitzer Center on Crisis Reporting, and other human rights and political organizations.

=== Prevention of hate speech ===
In workshops, including under the auspices of the OSCE, SOVA Center advocates for the prevention of hate speech on the Russian Internet and for the facilitation of alternate constructive dialogue by tracing hate-sites, establishing contacts with providers in order to abolish such sites, and facilitating discussions of hatred on the Internet in order to stimulate providers to block inadmissible content. SOVA Center does not claim to support eliminating hate speech in a fashion that would endanger free speech as such.

SOVA Center presents seminars, such as one held October 26, 2006, organized with the Office of the President of the Russian Federation, titled "Incitement to hatred and enmity: legal counter-measures and law enforcement." Approximately 50 representatives from committees of the State Duma, Federal Security Service, General Prosecutor's Office, Russian Academy of Sciences, and other organizations attended. The participants agreed that while current laws sufficiently address hate crimes, improvements were required, in particular so that current statutes would not be broadened to enable arbitrary interpretation and enforcement.

== Controversies ==
State Duma Deputy and Judicial Committee Deputy Chairman Andrey Savelyev filed a criminal libel complaint against a number of NGOs including SOVA Center on July 13, 2007, citing use of the terms "ultra-right" and "racist" in articles on SOVA Center's website. He claimed that ascribing such qualities constituted a criminal accusation according to Russia's anti-extremism laws. Russian authorities investigated SOVA's comments and found the complaint to be without merit.

== See also ==
- Human rights in Russia
- Racism in Russia
- Movement Against Illegal Immigration
- Category:Russian nationalism
- Open Society Foundations (OSF)
- National Endowment for Democracy (NED)
