= Timur Kacharava =

Russian anti-fascist activist of Georgian origin (1985-2005)

- Тимур Качарава თემურ კაჭარავა
- Born: August 21, 1985; Kiev Oblast, Ukrainian SSR, Soviet Union (now Ukraine)
- Died: November 13, 2005 (aged 20); Saint Petersburg, Russia
- Cause of death: Murder
- Occupations: Musician, anti-fascist

Timur Kacharava (Russian: Тиму́р Влади́мирович Качара́ва, Timur Vladimirovich Kacharava; Georgian: თემურ კაჭარავა, T’emur Kach’arava; 21 August 1985 – 13 November 2005) was a Russian university student, punk musician and anti-fascist activist of Georgian origin. He was murdered at the age of 20 by members of a far right nationalist group in St. Petersburg.

== Biography ==
Kacharava was born into the family of an army officer near Chernobyl. He studied at Saint Petersburg State University and was involved in a student anti-fascist and anarchist group that organized anti-fascist demonstrations and philanthropic actions. In 2003, he founded the hardcore punk band Sandinista!, for which he played guitar. In 2005, he also played for the crust punk band Distress, which toured Sweden.

On 13 November 2005, Kacharava was stabbed to death in St. Petersburg's Vosstaniya Square after sharing meals for Food Not Bombs, receiving five wounds in the neck. A companion was also stabbed and seriously wounded. Observers believed that the attack may have been motivated by his activism in the anti-fascist movement.

== The response and the trial ==
Over 3,000 St. Petersburg State University students petitioned the President of Russia, Vladimir Putin, to find and punish the murderers. In December 2005, police arrested seven suspects who eventually admitted to the crime. On 7 August 2007, Alexander Shabalin was sentenced to 12 years in prison on charges of a murder and incitement to ethnic or racial hatred. Six other members of the gang, who held Kacharava and prevented him from resisting, were charged with inciting social hatred, and were given suspended sentences.

The main defendant in the trial was 14 years old.

Russian human rights association Agora considered the trial as the most important achievement of human rights defenders in Russian courts in 2007.

Kacharava's family, friends and colleagues remained convinced that Kacharava was the victim of an organized and well-armed neo-Nazi group. His friends testified that he had been followed, received threats by telephone, and been targeted before. According to Kacharva's family's lawyer, the court accepted the scenario in which the murderer claimed he had spontaneously suggested beating up an anti-fascist activist, and did not charge the other assaulters as accomplices in the murder. Kacharava's death led some of Russia's young anti-fascists to change tactics and use violence against neo-Nazis and racists.

== See also ==
- Racism in Russia
