= Bolshaya Bronnaya Synagogue =

Orthodox synagogue in Moscow, Russia

- Russian: Московская Синагога на Большой Бронной улице
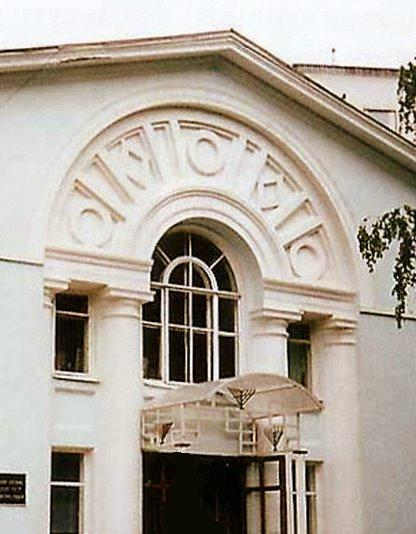
- The synagogue in c. 2008

- Location of the synagogue in Moscow

Religion
- Affiliation: Hasidic Judaism
- Ecclesiastical or organisational status: Synagogue (1881–1937); Profane use (1937–1991); Synagogue (since 1991)
- Leadership: Rabbi Yitzchok Kogan
- Status: Active

Location
- Location: 6 Bolshaya Bronnaya Street, Moscow
- Country: Russia
- Coordinates: 55°45′37″N 37°35′53″E

Architecture
- Type: Synagogue architecture
- Completed: 1883
- Materials: Brick

The Bolshaya Bronnaya Synagogue (Russian: Московская Синагога на Большой Бронной улице) is a Chabad Jewish congregation and synagogue, located at 6 Bolshaya Bronnaya Street in Moscow, Russia.

== History ==
The synagogue was built as a private synagogue by pre-revolutionary millionaire Lazar Solomonovich Polyakov. Privately constructed and owned synagogues that served congregations were a familiar tradition in many parts of Europe; in the Russian Empire, great magnates could sometimes get permission to erect private synagogues outside of the Pale of settlement when congregations could not.

The pre-war rabbi was executed by the Soviet government in 1937 and the building was converted into a trade union meeting hall. In 1991, the building was transferred to Chabad Lubavich. In 2004, a renovation was completed. The building includes classrooms, a bookstore, a lecture hall, mikvah and kosher restaurant. Since 1991, the rabbi has been Yitzchok Kogan.

== Antisemitic attacks ==
- 1999 foiled bombing – In 1999 there was a failed bomb attack on the synagogue.
- 2006 stabbing attack – On January 11, 2006, the synagogue was attacked by a neo-Nazi skinhead who stabbed nine people. It was reported that Alexander Koptsev, aged 20 years, shouted "I will kill Jews" and "Heil Hitler" before stabbing at least eight men. The rabbi jumped Kotsev, and the rabbi's 18-year-old-son, Yosef Kogan, wrestled him to the ground. Kogan held the assailant until police detained him. A documentary film was made about the 1999 and 2006 incidents.

== See also ==
- History of the Jews in Moscow
- List of synagogues in Russia
