= Environmental racism in Russia =

Racism in Russia

Environmental racism is a form of institutional racism, which has led to the disproportionate disposal of hazardous waste in communities of colour in Russia. It also results in indigenous people disproportionately bearing the environmental burdens of mining, and oil or gas extraction. In Russia, there are 47 officially recognized indigenous groups, who have had some rights to consultation and participation under Russian law since 1999. However, these guarantees have steadily eroded with the re-centralization of state control, and several indigenous autonomous territories have been abolished since the 1990s.

Russia, an International Labor Organization member, has not ratified ILO 69, an agreement that explicitly asserts the right to self-determination for all indigenous peoples. This allows the Russian Federation to continue to deny Indigenous peoples' control over their land and resources. Russia is also a member of the United Nations, which recognizes indigenous peoples of classically colonized lands, but is somewhat vague about indigenous minorities who are not separated from their colonizers by an ocean. This is one of the arguments Russia uses to justify not complying with UN treaties in the case of the indigenous peoples of Siberia.

Environmental racism in Russia also affects Romani people and migrant workers.

== Effects on Indigenous groups in Russia ==
Throughout Russia, there has been significant industrial development and pollution on Indigenous lands. In many cases, these industrial developments arguably result in disproportionate harm for the Indigenous inhabitants, who in many cases do not benefit proportionally from industrial resource extraction and transportation projects. According to environment and geography scholar Craig ZumBrunnen, two of the most heavily polluted regions in Russia are Northeastern Russia and the Kola Peninsula.

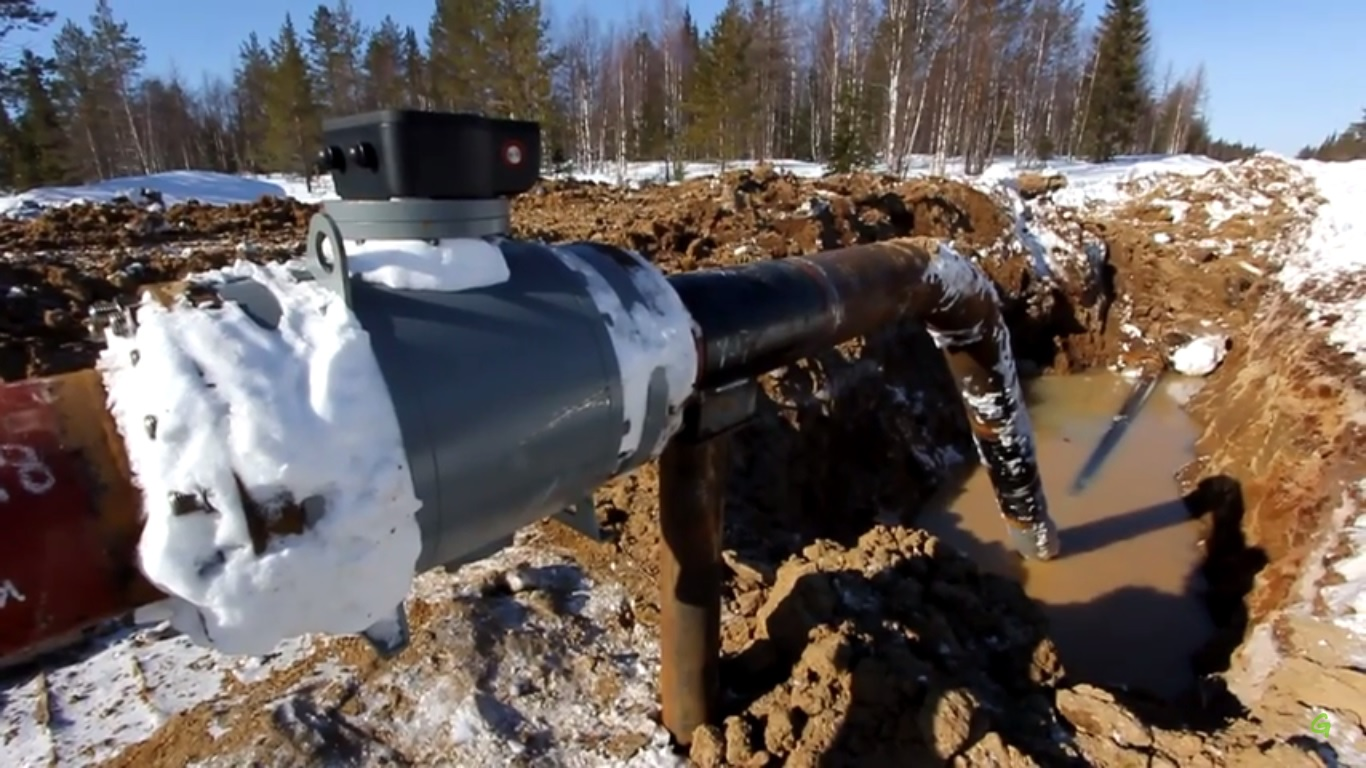
Pipeline leak, Izhma District, Komi Republic, on traditional Izvatas territories

The dispossession of Indigenous peoples from their lands throughout Russia for natural resource extraction has a long historical context of racism. According to Indigenous studies scholar Aileen Espiritu, "As non-European peoples, the Khanty, Mansi and Yamalo-Nenets were seen as inferior races by the Russians, and were therefore exploited for their goods and resources. Forcible Tsarist jurisdiction over Khanty, Mansi and Yamalo-Nenets territory began in the sixteenth century." Espiritu expands on the social implications of historical dispossession, writing

Throughout the eighteenth century, the exaction of exceedingly high yasak [tribute in furs] payments forced the Yamalo-Nenets and the Khanty to abandon their traditional economy of hunting and fishing in order to trap sables, and later foxes, for Russian officials and traders. The Khanty, Mansi, and Yamalo-Nenets were, therefore, forced to leave their own territories in an attempt to live as they had lived for hundreds, perhaps even thousands, of years (Prokof'yeva, et al. 1956:515) ... These effects on the Khanty, Mansi and Yamalo-Nenets, while serious, were minimal when compared to the imposition of Soviet rule and hegemony.

Bolshevik policies from 1917 onwards quickly focused on the transition of Indigenous economies from traditional livelihoods into socialist economies based upon, in the words of anthropologist Debra Schindler, "the creation of a 'modern,'... urban-industrial settlement system; collectivization of the indigenous production economy; development of natural resources and the industrial development of other branches of the economy; and the introduction of the indigenous population to and their incorporation in 'modern' (Russian) society (1991:70)." According to Espiritu, the result of these state policies "based on rigid and dogmatic Leninist ideology" has led to severe damage for the cultural traditions, identities, and indigenous lifestyles of aboriginal Russian peoples. In the opinion of geography scholar Gail A. Fondahl,

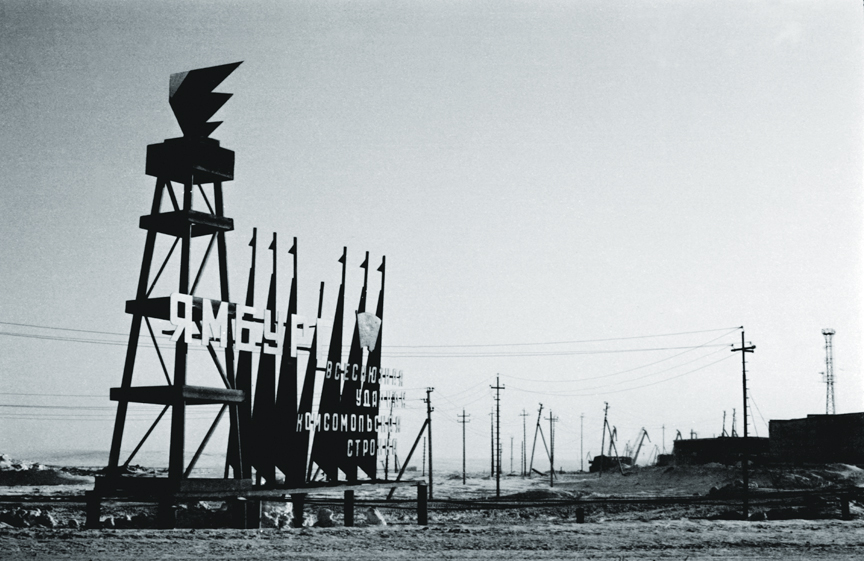
Soviet oil development, Yamalo-Nenets Autonomous Okrug, 1986

Upon assuming power, the Soviet state identified the peoples of the North as exceedingly primitive, and in need of a special policy body to facilitate the transition to socialism (Sergeev 1995; Slezkine 1994). At the same time the Bolsheviks fingered the North as a storehouse of wealth to be exploited for the development of the new socialist state. In the first decade of Soviet power, planners deliberated on balancing aboriginal needs and state aspirations in debates regarding northern development policy, but by the mid-1930s the latter took clear precedence over the former. When development concerns dictated, the state confiscated aboriginal lands and relocated Natives.

The drive for increased resource extraction intensified under Joseph Stalin's regime, resulting in particularly deleterious patterns of dispossession for indigenous peoples in the European North, Siberia, and the Far East. In the opinion of ZumBrunnen,

Since the inception of Stalin's forced industrialization campaigns in the 1930s, these extensive, remote, resource-rich regions have been targeted for industrial development, mineral and energy resource extraction and processing which have had particularly disruptive and contaminating effects ... not only did Soviet development plans favor industrialization over traditional forms of economic activities, but all too often these industrial developments have been in conflict with traditional indigenous economic activities, such as reindeer herding, fishing, fur harvesting, and self-sufficient forms of agriculture, domestic animal husbandry, and logging, all of which require healthy ecosystems."

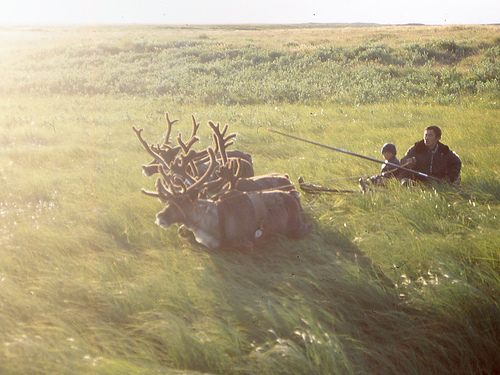
Nenets people with reindeer

Many of these issues of environmental degradation and indigenous dispossession have arguably continued from Soviet times into the present day. As described by one observer in 1991, "In the majority of regions inhabited by [the numerically Small Peoples of the North] the ecological situation has sharply intensified, the systematic destruction of established norms and rules of natural resource use has been allowed (O dopolnitel'nykh 1991)."

For Indigenous peoples in Russia, environmental degradation can often affect deeper cultural and metaphysical sentiments beyond ecological and economic concerns, extending to all aspects of indigenous lifestyles and epistemologies. As argued by Fondahl, "Northern peoples differed from other citizens of the Russian Federation due to their involvement in activities that required an intimate connection with, and an extensive use of, expansive homelands. If symbolic of primitivism in the eyes of many Soviet citizens, the traditional activities also symbolized a special, harmonic and intense interaction with the natural environments.

For example, when Soviet planners attempted to "rationalize", collectivize, and commercialize traditional Indigenous livelihoods such as reindeer husbandry, their efforts were frustrated by the realization that indigenous peoples worldviews treated such economies as intrinsically tied to non-economically quantifiable values of social and spiritual significance, which ran contrary to Soviet modernization rationale. Reindeer "conveyed a family's protective spirits, provided not only physical but spiritual nourishment at life-event celebrations, and accompanied the owner on her or his voyage from this world to the next". These metaphysical Indigenous values were rooted in the working indigenous vocabulary of reindeer husbandry to such an extent that Soviet workers assigned to the field with Indigenous groups frequently had little choice but to learn the Indigenous languages as no corollary terms for these expressions existed in Russian, yet were vital to learning the trade.

The effect of industry on the well-being of reindeer herding has been a profound concern to many Indigenous people in Russia. Speaking at the Second International Working Seminar on the Problems of Northern Peoples (Prince George, BC, Canada, 1996), V.A. Robbek, Director, Institute of the Problems of Northern Minorities, Yakutsk, Sakha Republic (Yakutia), stated, "Destroy our reindeer breeding and our traditional lands and you destroy us, the Even, as a people."

Similar views were expressed by another Russian Indigenous commentator in 1996, who stated

Our Native lands are being annexed and barbarically destroyed by rapacious petroleum and natural gas, coal, gold, and non-ferrous mining interests without any form of just compensation...and this phenomena [sic] is depriving us of our lands and rights to part of the resource wealth, [and] deprives us of our basic right—a right to life (Social...1996).

=== Oil and gas development ===
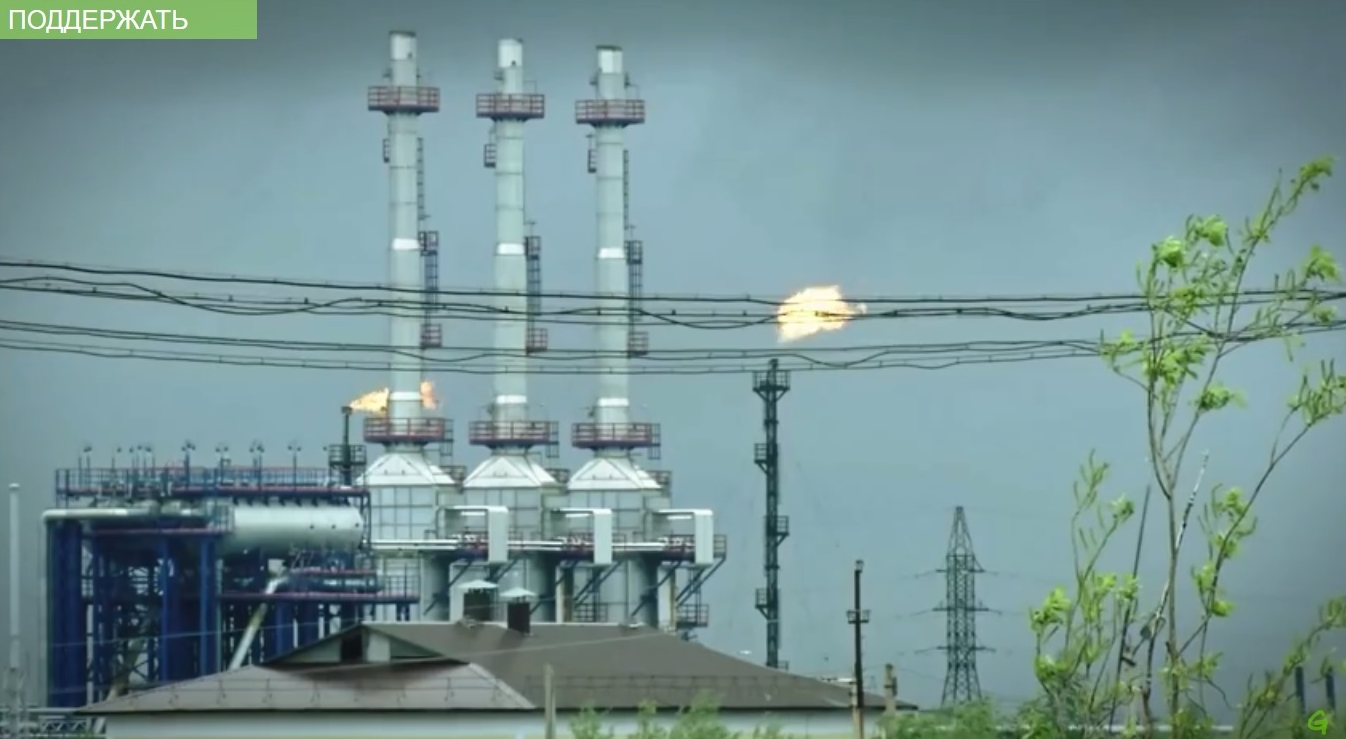
Gas flaring in Komi Republic. Traditional Komi territories, Russia.

In 2014, 70% of Russia's crude oil exports, and 90% of its natural gas exports, went to Europe. According to Henderson and Mitrova of the Oxford Institute for Energy Studies, European gas output is expected to slip from around 250bcm in 2014 to 225bcm in 2020 and 150bcm in 2030, leaving an import gap of over 310bcm by the end of this decade and over 420bcm by 2030. Much of this gap in demand could potentially be supplied by Russia. In the words of Henderson and Mitrova, "Gazprom's exports to Non-FSU (Former Soviet Union) countries rose from an initial level of 3.5bcm in 1970 to a peak of 162bcm in 2005, with sales extending across 28 countries in the region". Record quantities of oil were produced in Russia in 2015, with 534 million tons extracted, an increase of 1.5% over 2014 production levels. In 2015, a record 23 million tons of Russian petroleum products (including liquefied natural gas) were shipped through Arctic waters from Russian ports such as Murmansk, Arkhangelsk, and Varandey, as well as Norwegian ports such as Hammerfest, according to statistics provided by Vardø Bessel Traffic Service Centre in Norway.

Much of this energy supply was extracted from the traditional territories of Indigenous peoples, raising questions surrounding Indigenous rights, title, and environmental marginalization.

=== Nenets Autonomous Okrug ===
In 2015, 14.6 million tons of oil were produced from Nenets Autonomous Okrug, a 6.4% increase over 2014 production. There are 14 new oil and gas fields planned for development in the Nenets Autonomous Okrug, which lies within Northwestern Russia.

As of 2003, there were an estimated 6500 Nenets and 5000 Komi individuals residing in Nenets Autonomous Okrug, a majority of whom were engaged in reindeer husbandry. Large-scale degradation of reindeer grazing lands took place between the 1960s and 1980s; after a slowdown in development, the situation began to worsen by the early 2000s. In the words of Peskov and Dallmann, "In addition to the high unemployment among indigenous peoples, the situation in the reindeer husbandry sector is deteriorating: decreasing numbers of reindeer, misappropriation, absence of appropriate marketing schemes for products. These and other factors provoke a general degradation of indigenous society." Peskov and Dallmann identify responsibility on the part of both oil companies as well as the Nenets Autonomous Okrug government, which they claim has not lived up to its legal obligations to protect Indigenous rights. Peskov and Dallmann provide an overall opinion that "Nenets and Komi in this region have for many centuries maintained a traditional way of life rooted firmly in reindeer husbandry in the area. These are the people who mainly suffer as a result of the attitudes of newcomers to the Arctic natural environment, in spite of all legal guarantees."

=== Novaya Zemlya ===
In 1870 Nenets people were permanently settled on Novaya Zemlya by the Russian Empire to prevent Norwegian expansion. The traditional Nenets name for the archipelago, which lies in Northwestern Russia, is Edey Ya. According to the Preparatory Commission for the Comprehensive Nuclear-Test-Ban Treaty Organization, during the Cold War approximately 500 Indigenous persons were relocated from Novaya Zemlya to make way for nuclear testing. The reindeer living on the island either died or were relocated to the mainland. Between 1954 and 1990, 132 nuclear test explosions, ninety four percent of the aggregate yield of nuclear testing in the former Soviet Union, were conducted on the islands. On October 30, 1961, the Tsar Bomba hydrogen bomb was tested, representing the largest man-made explosion in history.

In spite of inexplicably high levels of cancer among Arctic Indigenous peoples in Russia during the 1960s and 1970s, comprehensive analysis of cancer statistics in 2004 indicate that overall, Indigenous peoples on the Kola Peninsula and in Nenets Autonomous Okrug (where there is significant radiation contamination) today experience below-average levels of cancer compared to the rest of Russia. However, reports by the Siberian branch of the Russian Academy of Sciences and the Russian Academy of Medical Sciences indicate high rates of chromosomal diseases and birth defects among Indigenous people around Novaya Zemlya which may be linked to nuclear testing. Locals have nicknamed the islands "the archipelago of death".

=== Komi Republic ===
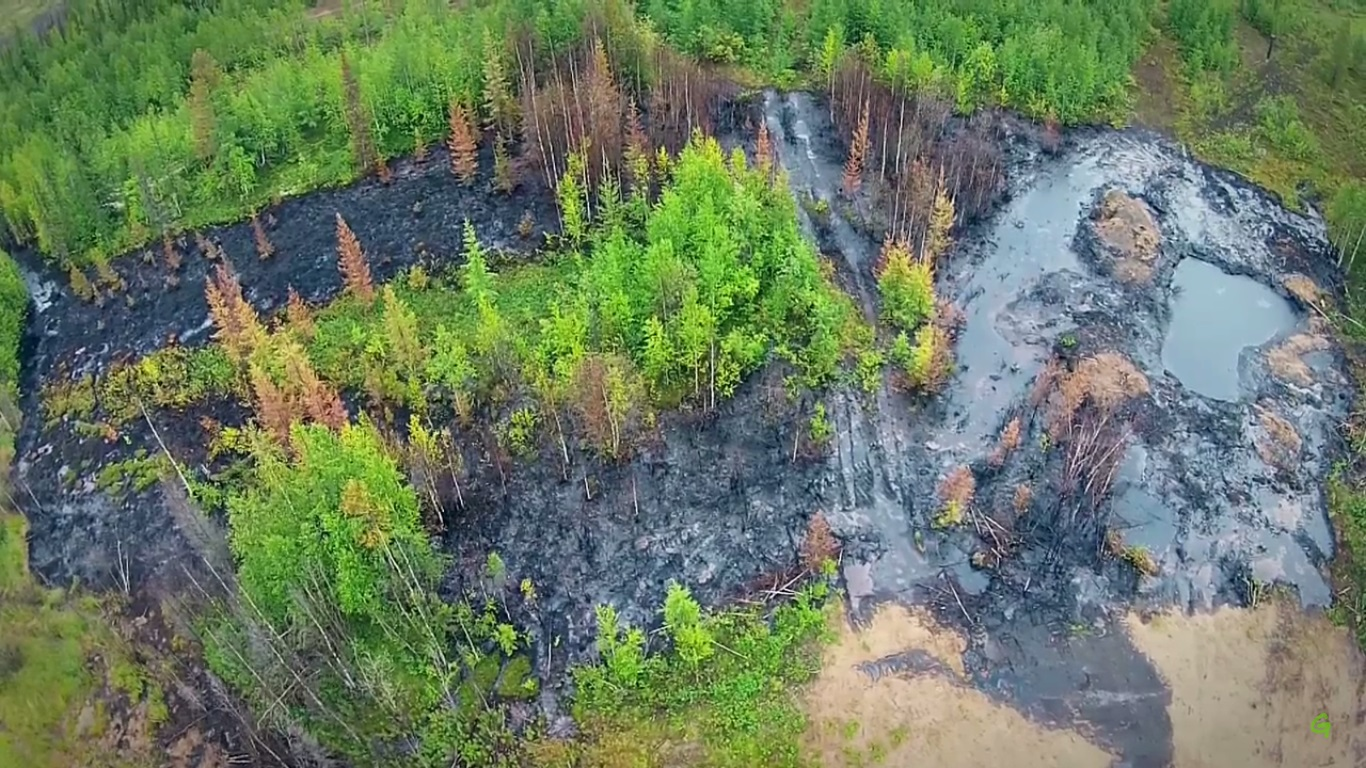
Oil spill in Komi Republic, near Ust-Usa, Usinsk region, on traditional Komi territories, Russia.

In 2015, 14.9 million tons of oil were produced from Komi Republic, an increase of 5.4% over 2014 production. The Komi Republic, which lies in Northwestern Russia, is home to the Indigenous Komi people, has 152 hydrocarbon fields, of which 87 produce oil and gas; 65 are currently in commercial production, and 22 are designated as experimental. In 1994, a pipeline fractured near the city of Usinsk, Komi Republic. According to Komineft (Komi Oil) and local government officials, 14,000 metric tons of oil leaked; however, this figure is disputed. According to the U.S. Department of Energy, the leak in fact saw 270,000 metric tons spilled. In the words of a press release from the International Work Group for Indigenous Affairs, "it was the site of the world's worst ever terrestrial oil spill."

The Pechora, Kolva, and Usa rivers have all experienced significant contamination from oil leaks. 1,900 leaks were documented along Komineft-owned pipelines between 1986 and 1991. Throughout the region, there are also concerns surrounding the accountability of environmental monitoring and cleanup programs.

For example, in the settlement of Kolva in Komi Indigenous territory, Komi Indigenous people were left to clean up the site of a major oil spill themselves, with minimal assistance from government authorities or oil company workers; the Head of Usinsk District, Alexander Tian, responded to Komi requests for help by allegedly stating "If you do not want to breathe in oil fumes, you should take a boat out and remove the oil yourself!" and offered to pay 10,000 rubles (approximately 250 Euros) per barrel recovered—a reimbursement that Kolva residents claim was not honoured. Out of 117 persons cleaning the site, 11 were workers from Rusveitpetro, the owner of the pipeline, a number that some activists felt was inadequate. Later, the inhabitants of Kolva asked for regular water testing over concerns of drinking water contamination. The results of the samples, sent to Syktyvkar, were never released, yet Komi Republic officials insisted that the tests determined the water was safe, leading to allegations of government unaccountability. According to an unidentified source from within the Komi Republic government administration, there were allegations word of the spill was suppressed by Rusveitpetro for a period of possibly several months, and that lawsuits would likely not cover the full costs of cleanup.

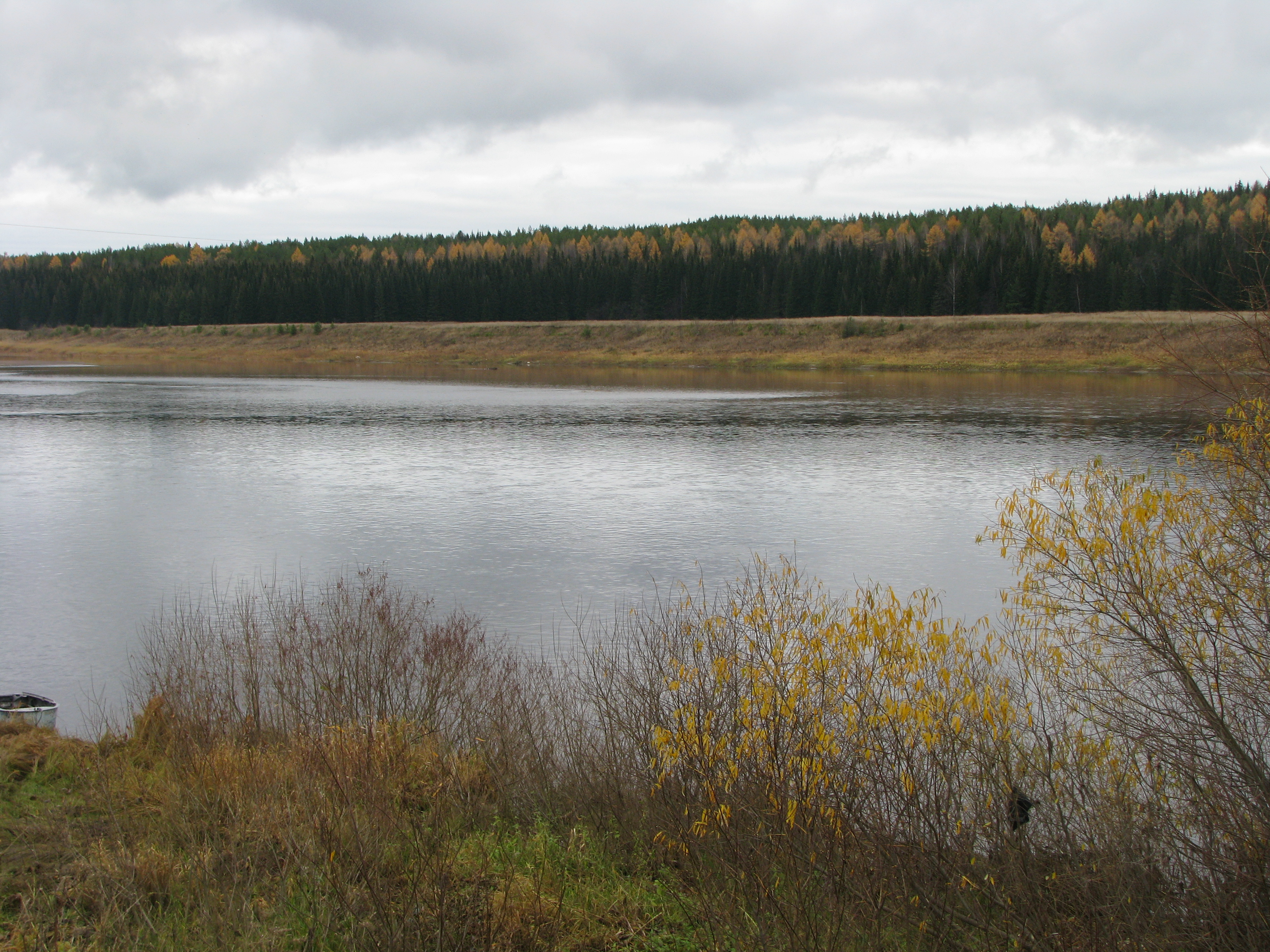
Izhma River near Ust-Ukhta Village

On April 10, 2016, members of the Komi Izvatas (also known as Komi Izhemtsy) Indigenous subgroup reported to the Committee to Save the Pechora that a large oil spill had taken place on the Yagera River near Ukhta. According to the Committee, 400 metric tons of crude oil reached the Izhma River, reportedly causing concerns of effects on Izvatas livelihoods. On April 26, sixteen days later, a possible source of the leak was identified by the Committee to Save Pechora at Malyi Voivoizh creek, although government officials could not confirm.

Many residents of Izhma district believe that cancers are occurring at an increasing rate of incidence due to pollution. Food sources such as fish have allegedly become contaminated, and reindeer have been poisoned by oil spills on their grazing areas. According to Makliuk, most residents of the district live in poverty. They also claim discriminatory hiring processes that give preference to non-local workers, in spite of the enormous revenues generated from their traditional territories. According to one resident, "we have to live on the disposal dump of [the] oil industry. We can't even sell our houses and move away, because they cost nothing."

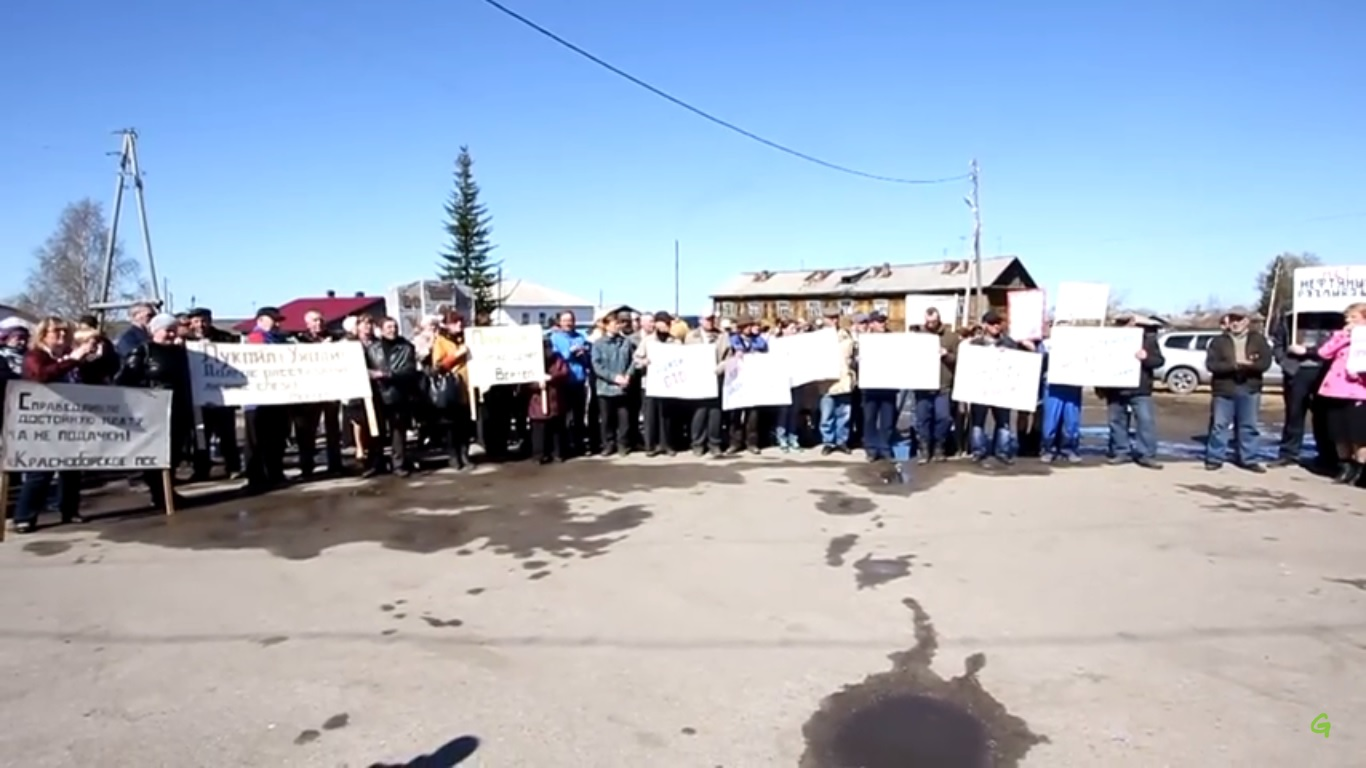
Indigenous Izvatas people protesting oil and gas development on their traditional territories. Schelyayur, Komi Republic, March 30, 2014.

On April 11, 2014, the Izhma district council passed a resolution to support a complete shutdown of oil and gas operations in the area. The decision was in part due to concerns over economic effects on reindeer herding; the residents of Izhma, many of whom are Izvatas, are part of the only subgroup within the Komi Indigenous people who still practice this livelihood. In particular, concerns were sparked by the discovery of new drilling rigs in close proximity (200 meters) to the village of Krasnobar, which had been installed without prior notice, permission, or consent of Izvatas communities or Izhma district administration, in contravention of environmental legislation. 150 people, representing twelve settlements, gathered for the vote, held in Krasnobar village; the Izhma district council voted unanimously in favor.

On June 5, 2014, a demonstration was held in Ust-Usa Village in Usinsk District, Komi Republic. The demonstration, held in the same region affected by the 1994 spill, followed earlier protests in Izhma and saw the adoption of a "strongly worded" resolution by Indigenous groups present. Protesters threatened to boycott future Komi Republic elections if their demands were not met. An excerpt from the declaration reads,

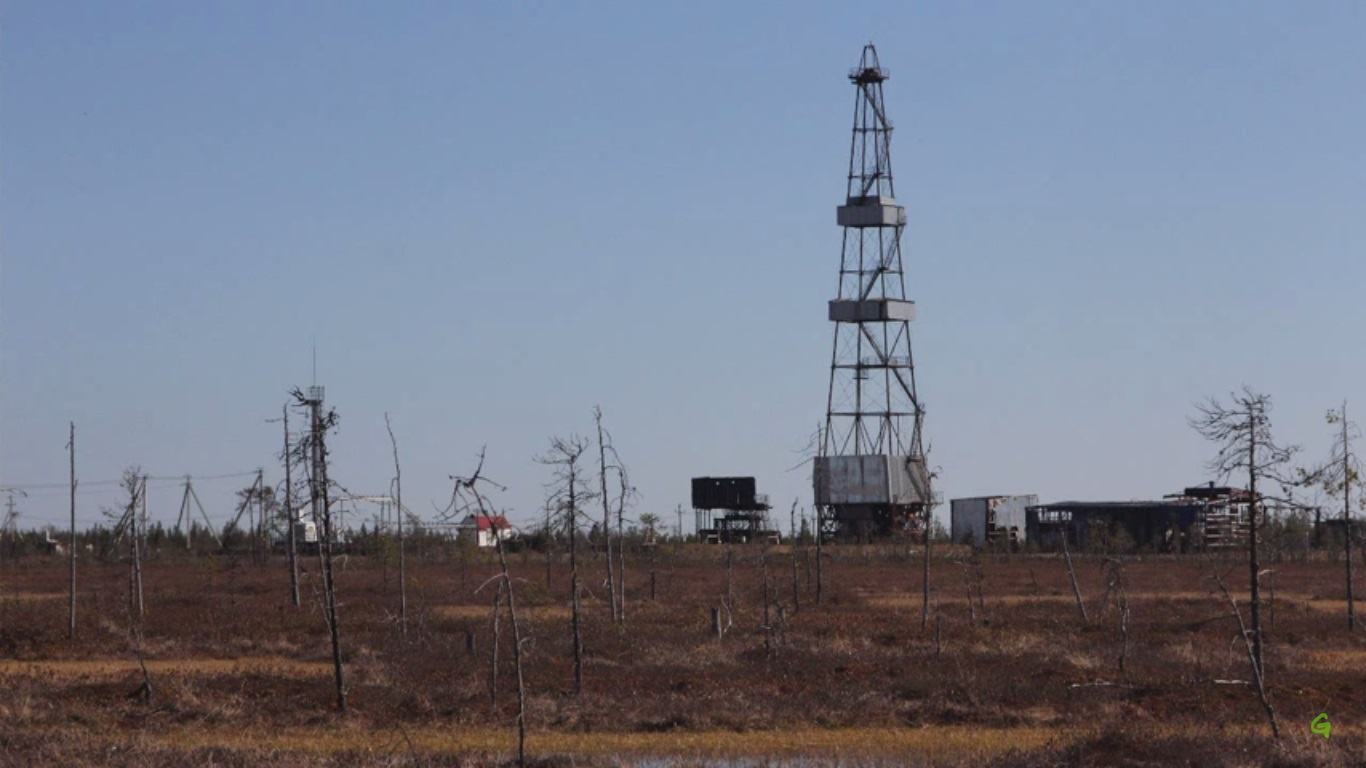
Aging oil infrastructure, Komi Republic, traditional Izvatas territories

We, the inhabitants of villages within Usinsk municipal district, have been experiencing the terrible consequences of oil extraction in our land for over four decades. Our rivers, lakes and swamps are being mercilessly polluted. Our ancestral land is being destroyed. We are deprived of the natural resources which are our main source of livelihood. Our constitutional rights to a healthy living environment, to clean air and clean water is being violated systematically. Oil companies, and first of all LUKOIL-Komi, the main operator of oil production within Komi Republic, are brushing off our letters and appeals with dismissals, promises and deceit. Neither have we never received an adequate and constructive response to our repeated enquiries to various authorities, from the municipal district administration to the country's leadership. They do not listen, they don't understand us. Therefore we are gathered here at the rally in the ancient village of Ust-Usa, and we declare that we join the residents of Krasnobor, Shelyayur and other settlements of Izhma district in that we will no longer idly observe the barbaric destruction of our land and the pollution of our rivers. People have come to our ancestral lands, who are not interested in our future and future of our children – they are only interested in the "black gold" – our mineral resources. And for its sake they are prepared to turn it into a lifeless space; and they do so.

=== Kola Peninsula ===
On the Kola peninsula in Northwestern Russia, Sami people were displaced from their traditional territories during the Cold War. The greatest single displacement took place when Sami fishermen were evacuated from the coastline in order to make way for secretive naval installations. Meanwhile, reindeer herders were dispossessed from their territories along a 200-mile zone adjacent to the border with Finland and Norway. This border was soon closed, effectively shutting communication and movement between Sami peoples in Finland, Norway, and Sweden with those on the Russian Kola.

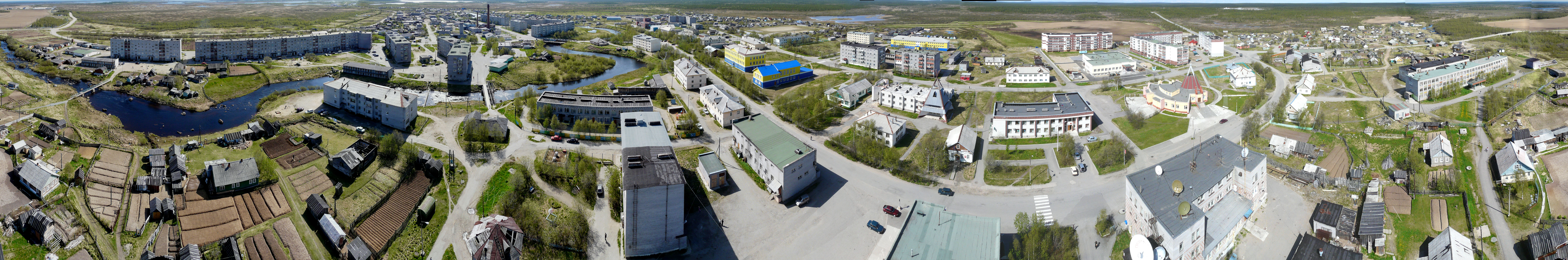
Lovozero, where many Sami displaced from their traditional territories have been resettled

Further displacement was caused by the arrival of increased heavy industry and natural resource extraction such as forestry and mining during Soviet times. Hundreds of thousands of workers from other areas of the USSR arrived, many of whom were forcibly interned as workers in the Gulags. This industrialization disrupted reindeer herding livelihoods, and led in part to the settlement of Sami into Soviet-designed urban areas such as Lovozero. Today, most Russian Sami live in extreme poverty and poor housing conditions.

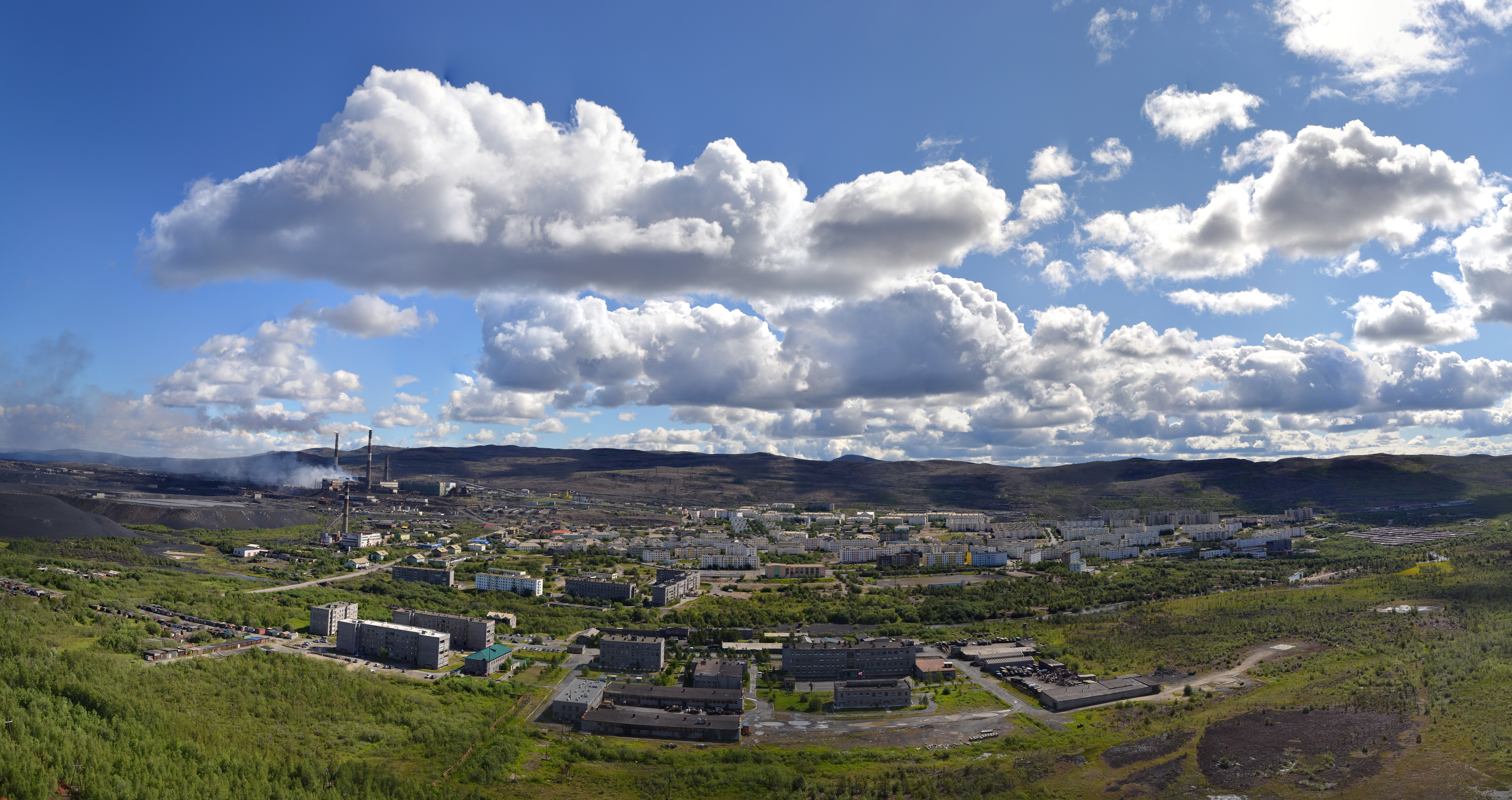
City of Nikel, Kola Peninsula, on traditional Sami indigenous territories. The Kola Mining and Metallurgical Combine is located at upper left.

Acid rain is a major concern on the Kola peninsula, where it has caused severe damage to thousands of square kilometres of tundra and taiga. The ecological balance of the peninsula has been adversely affected by mining operations, which has contributed to atmospheric pollution, damage to forests and natural meadow lands, and groundwater depletion and pollution.

According to ZumBrunnen, between 1964 and 1986 approximately 11,000 containers of "dangerous wastes" were dumped into the Kara and Barents seas. Nuclear waste dumping is believed to have occurred in Arctic waters nearby, and, as of 1997, many ships anchored near shore either stored or contained radioactive waste along the coastlines which had once been inhabited by evacuated Sami fishermen.

According to Sami activist Larisa Avdeyeva, the first public Sami protest in Russia took place in 1998, when a Swedish company attempted to establish an open-pit gold mine in the middle of Sami reindeer grazing lands. Today, vast areas of the Kola continue to be ecologically devastated by pollution from smelting, including operations such as the Kola Mining and Metallurgy Combine near the Norwegian border. Many nuclear facilities operate throughout the area, which continues to host numerous nuclear-waste sites. Pressure to expand mining as well as oil and gas production, and plans for new long-distance pipelines, have been growing concerns for Russian Sami.

Some Sami leaders have reported harassment, allegedly at the hands of the Russian government. In one notable case, the head of Russia's Sami parliament, Valentina Sovkina, was reportedly harassed and assaulted on her way to a UN Indigenous conference in New York in 2014, while other Sami leaders reported incidents such as alleged tampering of their passports en route to the event. According to SkyNews journalist Katie Stallard, "The Kremlin sees the region as a source of oil, gas and mineral wealth – a crucial part of its energy and security ambitions. Ms Sovkina thinks the authorities are worried the Sami will assert their right to self-determination, and to their share of the natural resources."

As of 2006, 1,600 Sami were living in Russia.

=== Western Siberia (Khanty-Mansi and Yamalo-Nenets Autonomous Okrug) ===
By 2008, more than 70 billion barrels of oil had been extracted from the Western Siberian province of Khanty-Mansi. Representing 70 percent of Russian oil production at a 2008 rate of seven million barrels a day, vast quantities of energy resources from Khanty-Mansi are destined for Western Europe annually. According to journalist Paul Starobin, the region's Indigenous inhabitants have experienced ongoing social and economic marginalisation, in spite of the economic wealth generated by oil and gas development. In the words of Starobin,

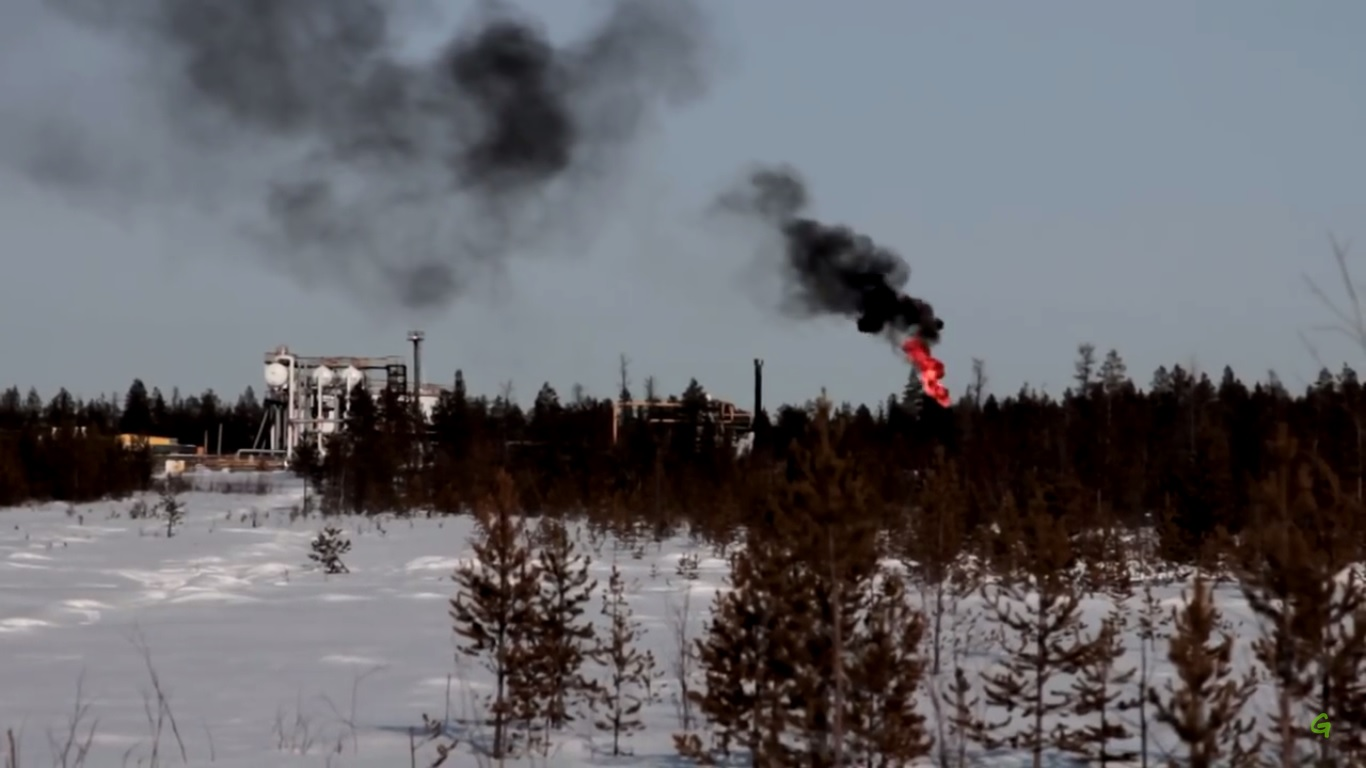
Nojabrxsk oil pollution, Yamalo-Nenets Autonomous Okrug, traditional Nenets territories

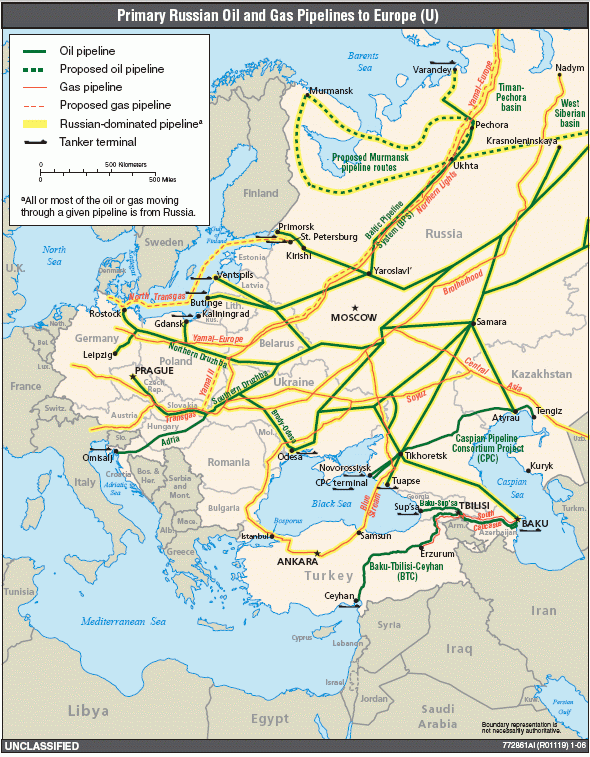
Map of Russian pipelines. Note lines linking Komi Republic, Nenets Autonomous Okrug, and Khanty-Mansi Autonomous Okrug to Western Europe

When Siberia's oil lands came under development, native people were forcibly herded into villages and cut off from their hunting and fishing grounds. Following the breakup of the Soviet Union, the nomads won legal status as "aboriginal people," with the right to roam the oil fields. In spite of their new status ... their lot has hardly improved. Their numbers are small, about 30,000 in all; their languages are nearly extinct; and they are heavily afflicted by the scourges of contemporary Russia—AIDS, alcoholism, and tuberculosis. Some oil-tax money is being invested in medical ships that stop along the rivers to care for patients. But critics say these floating clinics diagnose disease, then leave patients with no means to get treatment.

By the early 1970s, oil and gas reserves began to deplete in northeastern Russia, and production started to shift towards Western Siberia. Yet by the late 1980s, it was becoming increasingly visible that much of the wealth generated by oil and gas development was not reaching Indigenous groups. According to Espiritu, by this time the living conditions of many Indigenous people in Siberia was in a precipitous state, and Yamalo-Nenets groups were documented as living in "squalid" conditions in close proximity to the city of Salekhard.

As part of the rapid ramping up of production of oil and gas during the 1960s and 1970s, proper infrastructure for both the handling of petroleum products, as well as social infrastructure for the influx of workers, was frequently overlooked. Thousands of kilometres of pipelines were built using substandard construction codes for the harsh climate, resulting in vast numbers of leaks and spills. According to a 1997 essay by ZumBrunnen, environmentalists at the time estimated that 35,000 pipeline ruptures were occurring each year, accounting for between one and three percent of Russian oil output (3 to 10 million metric tons annually). Meanwhile, 19 billion cubic meters of gas were being flared in West Siberia annually, releasing polyaromatic hydrocarbons, heavy metals, carbon, and nitrogen dioxides into the local atmosphere. In 2012, the figure was estimated at 17.1 billion cubic metres.

Due to pollution from the oil and gas developments, reindeer herding, fishing, and hunting became unviable for many Yamalo-Nenets in the area, and many had little choice but to request government assistance. Since the 1980s, fluctuations in energy production in Khanty-Mansi and Yamalo-Nenetskiy Autonomous Okrugs have caused many Indigenous Khanty, Mansi, and Yamalo-Nenets peoples who were employed in the energy sector to find themselves out of work, with no viable traditional livelihoods to return to.

It has been estimated (according to statistics given in an interview by Evgenia Belyakova, Arctic project coordinator for Greenpeace Russia) that the total cost of replacing Russia's ageing pipelines could cost 1.3 trillion Russian rubles (approximately 1.5 billion US dollars), but could be achieved within five years if companies were prepared to absorb a 25% drop in profits at 2015 energy prices.

== Land use agreements and Indigenous-rights legislation ==
According to Indigenous studies scholar Brian Donahoe, "Article 69 of the 1993 Russian Constitution explicitly guarantees in principle the 'rights of the indigenous small-numbered peoples in accordance with the universally recognized principles and norms of international law and international agreements that the Russian Federation has entered into."

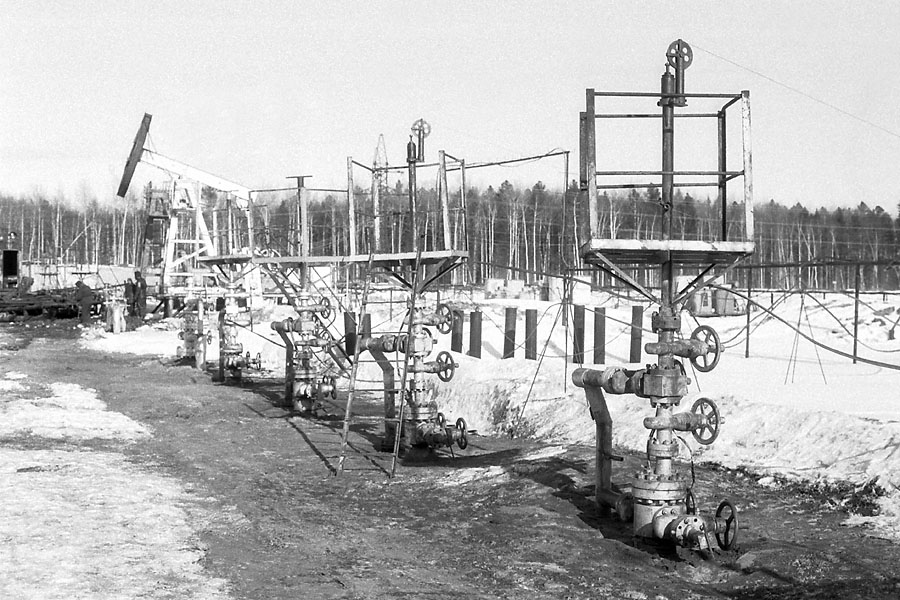
Petroleum infrastructure near Surgut, Western Siberia, 2000.

The "vague wording" of laws surrounding indigenous rights in Russia has resulted in Indigenous land use agreements in Russia that are often informal in nature. For example, "Dmitry Aleksandrovich Nesanelis, the former vice director of the Lukoil-Varandeyneftegaz oil drilling company (Lukoil's daughter company in the Nenets Autonomous Oblast), an anthropologist by training and the person responsible for relations between this company and the indigenous Nenets people, asserted in 2003 that it was in the interests of the state to make these laws so vague as to be unworkable."

Nesanelis has also spoken of concerns regarding the implications of vague legislation on oil drilling. According to Donahoe, "As a large multinational corporation, Lukoil is concerned with its public image with respect to the effect its activities have on indigenous peoples and on the environment." Nesanelis has stated he would prefer laws that would give energy corporations "some concrete guidelines about 'what exactly they have to pay, how, and to whom.'"

While some Indigenous leaders such as Vladislav Peskov, president of the Association of Indigenous Small-Numbered Peoples of the Nenets Autonomous Oblast have spoken in favour of informal agreements (Peskov has stated that "Different people need different things. Some need land, some need money, and the informal agreements with the drillers allow everyone to get what they really want"), others have voiced concerns about the long-term implications of informal land-use agreements. In the opinion of Donahoe, the informal nature of these agreements privilege short-term benefits over the security of long-term legal protections. In the words of Donahoe, "Having failed to assert their legal rights when they could have [after 2004, new Russian laws such as the omnibus Federal Law no. 122 have weakened indigenous legal rights, especially Federal Law no. 232 pertaining to changes in Environmental Impact Assessments], they will find in the longer term that their economically and politically more powerful partners can turn the law against them when it behooves them to do so."

Russia, an International Labor Organization member, has not ratified ILO 69, an agreement that "explicitly and unequivocally asserts the right to self-determination for all indigenous peoples". According to Donahoe, this allows the Russian Federation to "continue to deny Indigenous peoples true control over their economic resources". As articulated by Donahoe,

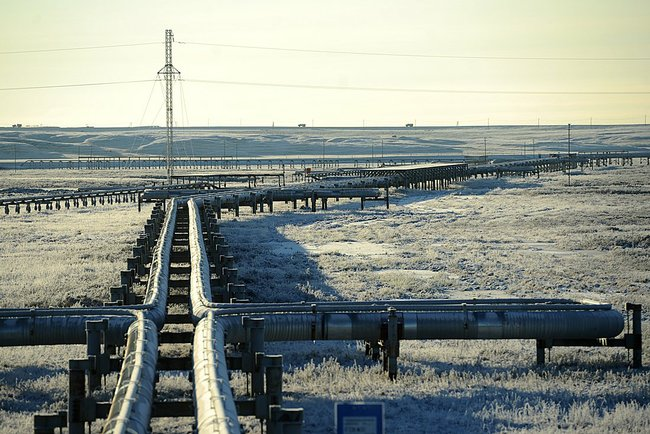
Bovanenkovo gas field infrastructure, Yamal Peninsula

Russia is also a member of the United Nations whose charter somewhat vaguely states that one of the purposes of the organization is 'to develop friendly relations among nations based on respect for the principle of equal rights and self-determination of peoples' (Article 1, paragraph 2) ... The United Nations recognizes indigenous peoples of classically colonized lands—namely, colonized lands that lie across an ocean from the colonizing country (the "salt water test"; see Magnarella 2001, 2002; Niezen 2003, 138)—but has carefully avoided recognizing indigenous minorities who are not separated from their colonizers by an ocean as 'peoples.' This lack of recognition implicitly denies such indigenous peoples the right to self-determination—one of the arguments Russia uses to justify not complying with UN treaties in the case of the indigenous peoples of Siberia.

Indigenous groups whose traditional territories lie in European Russia, such as the Nenets, Komi, and Sami peoples, are affected by this status of non-recognition of the right to self-determination, which, as federal policy implicates all Indigenous groups in Russia in addition to Siberia.

Arguably, some of the implications of non-recognition of Indigenous title may be the existence of laws that allow for socio-environmental marginalization to take place. According to Donahoe, "The federal government's monopoly over the law can be best illustrated by the negotiations over the new Land Code (Zemel'nyi Kodeks; Federal Law no. 136 of October 25, 2001) and Forest Code (Lesnoi Kodeks; Federal Law no. 200 of December 4, 2006)" which have allowed for the privatization of timber supplies. Under new iterations of these laws, previously non-commercially exploitable "forest fund [lesnoi fond]" lands, which constitute approximately 70 percent of Russia's landmass, have arguably been opened up for private sale. These new laws arguably lack provisions for the recognition of Indigenous rights, resulting in a Forest Code that, in the opinion of Donahoe, "effectively removes the power of regional governments (republics, oblasti, kraia, okrugi, etc.) to exert [non-federal] control over these lands".

The result has been a centralization of power over land management, which has arguably contributed to an unstable legal and economic context for the livelihoods of Indigenous hunters and reindeer herders who "operate in a virtually noncash economy and could not possibly afford to purchase or lease the extensive tracts of land necessary to migrate seasonally, which is crucial both to reindeer husbandry and to the effective exploitation of animal resources", according to Donahoe. The privatization of land has widened concerns over access rights, which could potentially have negative effects on Indigenous hunting and grazing.

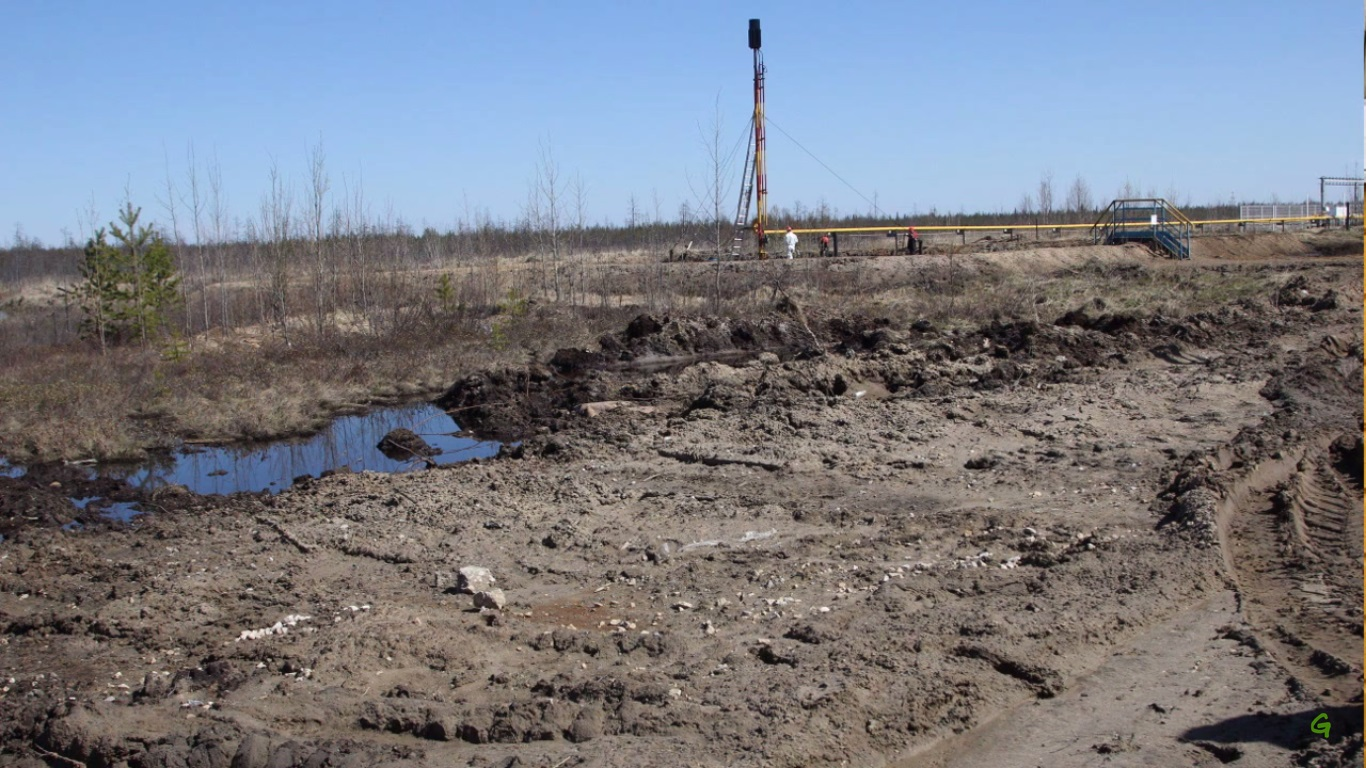
Komi Republic oil pollution, on traditional Izvatas territories

Indigenous groups in Russia have attempted to defend their rights in court. In the opinion of Donahoe, Indigenous groups in Russia have "demonstrated ingenuity in their attempts to assert their rights to land and resources and to protect against industrial development and extractive activities by using other laws not specifically designed for the protection of indigenous rights". For example, Indigenous groups have established "national parks or specially protected nature territories (osobo okhranaemye prirodnye territorii) at the local or regional level or both", under their rights to do so as outlined in Federal Law no. 33 (March 14, 1995), "On Specially Protected Nature Territories [Ob osobo okhranaemykh prirodnykh territoriiakh]". In one case, the Native Assembly of the KMAO (Khanty-Mansi Autonomous Okrug) "asked" Andrew Wiget and Ol'ga Balalaeva to craft a law that would "protect the 'folklore' of the indigenous people of Khanty-Mansi more generally". Khanty-Mansi Autonomous Okrug is an important oil-and-gas-producing region, responsible for the supply of large quantities of energy to Western Europe. It is also an area that has seen significant degradation of Indigenous lands as a result of oil and gas development. According to Donahoe,

The idea was that, by protecting folklore, they would also be protecting the environment within which the folklore was embedded. It was especially important that the law should 'link the perpetuation of living folklore traditions to specific communities and landscapes': Understood in its fullest sense, it means that sacred place myths cannot exist without sacred places, nor local legends without the sites to which they are attached. In short, folklore cannot meaningfully endure if separated from the specific enculturated environment that it inhabits. Because the power to deface that environment rests with the non-native, political majority, this is potentially urgent, because KMAO is today the center of Russia's petroleum industry, and in some areas almost 90% of the land surface is licensed for petroleum production (Wiget and Balalaeva 2004, 139-140).

After losing "some of its most important provisions", KMAO Law no. 37-03, "On the Folklore of the Native Minority Peoples of the North Living on the Territory of Khanty-Mansi Autonomous Okrug" was passed on May 30, 2003, and came into effect June 18, 2003, with its arguably most important provision intact: "Native Minority Peoples living on the territory of Khanty-Mansi Autonomous Okrug are guaranteed, in the manner established by legislation:...(3) the preservation and protection of the places of the traditional circulation of folklore, and of the natural resources necessary for the perpetuation and development of folklore traditions" (KMAO Law no. 37-03, Chapter 2, article 5, paragraph 2.3).

== Environmental racism against Romani people and migrant workers ==
Romani in Russia are frequently subject to geographic marginalization due to xenophobia. In 2005, Romani settlements in Arkhangelsk and Kaliningrad became the target of xenophobic political campaigns, in which local politicians used elections platforms that argued for "'cleaning' their city of 'gypsies' as one of their major promises to be fulfilled after winning the elections ... these politicians openly accused the entire Romani population of earning a living from the drug trade". Romani were then accused of constructing illegal dwellings. In Kaliningrad, Romani houses were later violently evicted by force. In Arkhangelsk, after obtaining legal permission to rent their parcels of land in Novy Posyolok, the Romani were then accused of not having permission to build houses; in 2006, the entire community was forced to leave the city "on a train provided for this purpose by the city administration, taking them to the Moscow region, into another illegal situation...but out of the city's political debates".

According to Paris-based Russian human rights organization Anti-Discrimination Centre (ADC) Memorial, there is a "tendency that market considerations and contempt toward persons regarded as 'Gypsies' coalesce in the actions of municipalities carrying out urban renewal programs, in which the eviction of Roma from city centers—and public view—is an active component of public policy".

=== Inequality in access to energy resources ===
In Ivanovo Province, the Kolyanovo Romani settlement was located near the disused Ivanovo airport. The residents had been evicted from Ivanovo city 15 years earlier. Following plans to expand the airport, the community became threatened with eviction once again.

Often Romani settlements are denied access to utilities such as natural gas, despite the abundance of natural gas in Russia. For example, in Ryazan Province, the village of Dyaguilevo, with a population of 600 persons, has been established since 1988 in "extreme poverty" and, as of 2008, has faced significant issues with obtaining reliable natural gas and electricity service.

An arguably more extreme case of inequality over access to energy resources can be found in the Roma village of Plekhanovo, located five kilometres outside Tula. As of 2008, the village was inhabited by 3000 individuals, most of whom had been settled there since the 1960s. In March 2016, a violent confrontation took place between residents (including children) and as many as 500 riot police over access to a natural gas pipeline that runs through the village. In spite of the line running through the village, the Romani inhabitants, whose houses were at risk of demolition, had been unable to secure legal access rights to the gas, and had resorted to illegally tapping into the pipeline for domestic use. According to community representative Nadezhda Demetr, "Instead of helping people register their houses and legalise their gas supplies, the authorities have been demolishing their houses. Since 2005, houses have been demolished without compensation because they don't have any documents." Another local Romani community leader, Ivan Grigoryevich, stated to media that "We have been living in this settlement since the 1960s and we have tried many, many times to get gas into our houses, but we are prohibited by town officials."

=== Romani evictions ===
In another conflict related to land and natural resource issues, the village of Kosaya Gora (3 kilometres outside Tula) was, as of 2008, threatened with eviction. The village of 400 individuals had been located at its current site since the 1960s, yet the land on which the Romani resided was declared by a court to be located on a "protected nature reserve area", according to Romani rights activists.

In a similar case to Kosaya Gora, residents of a Romani settlement in Chudovo were faced with eviction in 2007. The residents, who had resettled to the area with verbal consent from local authorities after being evacuated from the Chernobyl nuclear disaster, had been living in the area since the mid-1990s, later to learn that their houses were declared as falling within a "sanitary protection zone" around an unused asphalt plant, and that their homes would be subject to demolition. Without access to documents to demonstrate title to the land, the community could not effectively argue in protection of their claimed property rights.

=== Migrant workers from Hungary and Central Asia ===
Migrant workers in Russia frequently experience issues of environmental marginalization as a result of social and economic pressure to live in high-risk, substandard accommodations. According to Anti-Discrimination Centre (ADC) Memorial,

Migrant workers, especially families with children, often cannot find accommodation, due to high prices and the unwillingness of landlords to rent their property to migrants, particularly to those who do not have the appropriate documentation. As a result, migrant families are forced to live in places not designed for living, especially for living with children. Companies, who are happy to employ cheap migrant labor, and to save on their accommodation, are often facilitating this process.

As of 2013, in the Nevsky district of St. Petersburg migrant workers and their families have been documented living in unsafe housing conditions that lacked utilities such as safe drinking water and electricity. Many of the workers were from the former Soviet Republics of Tajikistan and Kyrgyzstan. As of 2013, there was also a shantytown on the outskirts of St. Petersburg, segregated in a remote, difficult to access industrial area, whose residents were Uzbek citizens from Khorezm city. In addition to concerns over health and safety similar to those faced by migrant workers in Nevsky district, this settlement had no waste collection service, and contained large garbage pits.

Other areas of environmental concern have been the settlements of "Roma-Mugat" migrants from Tajikistan, such as the settlement at Volodarka village, St. Petersburg. As of 2013, according to ADC Memorial,

The living conditions of Mugat-migrants do not correspond to elementary sanitary norms and requirements for security and hygiene. In Mugat settlements, which usually have several hundred inhabitants, there is no water supply, heating or electricity. Improvised settlements are spread on the boundaries of big towns, near household waste dumps, forest strips, [and] industrial areas ... where there is practically no infrastructure water supply, electricity and sewage system [sic].

Many of these "Central Asian Roma-migrants" have extremely poor diets, which are often supplemented by scavenged food from dumps. This has caused epidemic proportions of "tuberculosis, hepatitis, intestinal disorders, and helminthiasis".

Romani migrants from Hungary often face visible issues of environmental marginalization in Russia. As of 2013, according to ADC Memorial, "One of the largest Roma-Magyar settlements is situated in the industrial area on the outskirts of Saint-Petersburg. It borders the Saint-Petersburg-Moscow railway line and the household waste dump." Within the camp, the houses were made of scavenged materials, and basic services and utilities such as water, sewerage, and garbage collection were nonexistent; for bathing, many residents used water from a nearby marsh. Due to substandard housing and the lack of water distribution, all residents lived in constant risk of fire hazards.
