= Nerus (political slur) =

Russian political slur

In Russian culture, nerus (нерусь, "non-Rus") is a xenophobic slur in reference to the opponents of Russia in broad sense, either as a collective noun or an individual reference, in the context of the "Friend or Foe" dichotomy. A neutral Russian adjective with the same meaning is нерусский, "nerussky". The word is constructed akin to the word нечисть, nechist ("nechistaya sila", literally "non-clean force", i.e., "evil spirit").

== Historical usage ==
The word was recorded by Vladimir Dahl in 1881 in the meaning "foreigners, aliens, inorodtsy". and the term had a negative connotation, akin to similar terms in other cultures, such as "gaijin".

Anti-Soviet monarchist philosopher Ivan Ilyin referred to the Soviet state as "okaiannaia nerus" ("accursed non-Rus") as opposed to the "Holy Rus".

== Modern Russia ==
In Modern Russia the term is embraced by far right Russian nationalists.

Russian ultranationalist Oleg Platonov in his 2005 book Святая Русь и окаянная нерусь defines nerus as "the totality of active enemies of the Russian people and Russia." Right-wing philosopher Konstantin Krylov, one of the main organizers of "Russian marches", wrote an article titled "Rus and Nerus" ("Русь и нерусь"), where he defined "nerus" as "the totality of peoples, classes, social groups, as well as professional, religious and other communities seeking to subjugate, suppress or even destroy Russians as a people and Russia as an independent state". In particular, his definition encompasses "denationalized" people, who, even being of Russian ethnicity, keep the Russian nation in contempt. For the latter category of people ("anti-Russian" Russians) there is a Russian word вырусь, "vyrus". Social anthropologist Aleksandra Arkhipova took a note of the sharp rise of the usage of the latter term in Russian media since 2020..Sergey Kara-Murza writes that the word "nerus" was not in use in the Soviet Union and it was Platonov who brought it back, and popularized it.

Anna Nezhinskaya notices that Krylov's definition took place of the term "enemy of the people" and avoids the association with the Bolsheviks.

== Similar concept ==
Vyrus' (wikt:вырусь) is a 21st century derogatory neologism denoting a Russian who abandoned the Russian identity in favor of another one.
