= Constitutional Democratic Party – Party of Popular Freedom =

Minor political party in Russia (1990–1995)

Constitutional Democratic Party – Party of Popular Freedom Конституционно-демократическая партия — Партия народной свободы
- Abbreviation: KDP–PNS
- Chairman of the Central Committee: Georgy Deryagin (1990); Mikhail Astafyev (1990–?)
- Founded: 15 May 1990
- Registered: 25 September 1991
- Dissolved: 1995
- Split from: Union of Constitutional Democrats
- Preceded by: Constitutional Democratic Party
- Ideology: Before 1991: National liberalism; Reformism; Federalism; Anti-communism; After 1991: Anti-Yeltsinism; Populism; Anti-privatization
- Political position: Center-right to right-wing
- National affiliation: Democratic Russia (1990–91); Derzhava (1995); Zemsky Sobor (1995)
- Congress of People's Deputies of the RSFSR (1990): 1 / 1,068
- Moscow City Council (1990): 3 / 500

The Constitutional Democratic Party – Party of Popular Freedom (KDP–PNS; Russian: Конституционно-демократическая партия — Партия народной свободы, КДП—ПНС) was a political party in the USSR and Russia. It followed a path of development similar to that of the Democratic Party of Russia in early 1990s, developing from pro-reform/pro-democracy positions (as a member of the Democratic Russia coalition until late 1991) to nationalist opposition to Yeltsin and successive governments.

== History ==
=== Founding (1990) ===
The party was founded in 1990 by disenchanted 'fundamentalist' members of the Union of Constitutional Democrats. The party leaders adopted the 1917 program of the Cadet party of the Russian Empire. Mikhail Astafyev, people's deputy of RSFSR defected to the new organization in August 1990.

=== Evolution (1991-1992) ===
In June 1991 the '11th Refoundation Congress' of the Cadet party took place (the last congress of the historical cadet party was held in 1920). Astafyev was elected as the chairman of the re-established party. The party was initially strongly pro-reform and joined the Democratic Russia coalition, but moved to the opposition following the collapse of the Soviet Union. Whereas in 1991 they advocated 'dis-establishing the totalitarian communist regime', in early 1992, Astafyev in effect joined the radical communist-nationalist opposition to Yeltsin's government, which led a number of party members to resign.

From that time on, the party called for resignation of the government of Yeltsin–Gaidar, putting end to privatization of state enterprises and 'collapse of kolkhozes', 'veto to territorial concessions' etc. Astafyev concentrated his efforts on the National Salvation Front activities.

=== Dissolution (1993-1995) ===
The party could not participate in the 1993 legislative election due to failing to gather necessary number of signatures. In 1994, the Cadet party split, as internal opposition led by N.Kulikov accused Astafyev of having moved to 'left-wing extremist positions'. In 1995, Astafyev joined Alexander Rutskoy's Derzhava movement, but the two soon parted ways due to a dispute in dividing positions in electoral list. Later in 1995, the Cadet party of Astafyev joined Zemsky sobor ('All-National Congress'), another minor nationalist coalition.

== See also ==
- Constitutional Democratic Party
- Nashi
- Liberal Democratic Party of Russia
- Democratic Party of Russia

== Sources ==
- Коргунюк, Ю.Г.; Заславский, С.Е. (1996). "Глава 6. Националистическое и "державническое" движение". Российская многопартийность [Russian multi-party system. Ch.6. Nationalist and paternalist movement] (in Russian). Archived from the original on 2 March 2009.
- "Конституция Российской Федерации (внесена Российской Христианско-Демократической партией и Партией конституционных демократов Российской Федерации)" [Constitution of the Russian Federation (proposed by the Russian Christian Democratic Party and the Party of Constitutional Democrats of the Russian Federation)]. Обозреватель - Observer (in Russian) (17 (21)). РАУ-Университет. 1993. Archived from the original on 24 December 2013.
