= National Salvation Front (Russia) =

Defunct political coalition in Russia

National Salvation Front Фронт национального спасения
- Abbreviation: FNS (English); ФНС (Russian)
- Leader: Collective leadership
- Founders: Albert Makashov; Sergey Baburin; Gennady Zyuganov; Nikolay Pavlov; Ilya Konstantinov; Mikhail Astafyev; Vladimir Isakov; Gennady Saenko; Alexander Nevzorov
- Founded: 24 October 1992; 34 years ago
- Banned: 4 October 1993; 33 years ago
- Succeeded by: CPRF-led National Patriotic Forces of Russia; Derzhava
- Ideology: Russian nationalism Soviet patriotism Anti-Yeltsinism; Factions: Left-wing nationalism Marxism–Leninism; Corporate statism National communism National Bolshevism; Orthodox Christian nationalism
- Political position: Syncretic; Factions: Far-left to Far-right
- Member parties: Russian All-People's Union; Communist Party of the RSFSR; Russian Communist Workers Party; Russian Christian Democratic Movement; Constitutional Democratic Party; National Republican Party; Russian Party of Communists; Front of National Revolutionary Action; National Bolshevik Party; Nashi movement
- Colours: Black; Yellow; White; Red

Party flag

The National Salvation Front (NSF or FNS; Russian: Фронт национального спасения; ФНС, Front natsional'nogo spaseniya, FNS) was a broad coalition of communist, socialist, and right-wing nationalist movements against the government of President Boris Yeltsin in Russia. Established in 1992, the FNS was the first group to be banned in post-Soviet Russia before playing a leading role in the 1993 Russian constitutional crisis.

== Foundation ==
The FNS was established at a congress on 24 October 1992 at which an alliance was concluded between some 3,000 communist and nationalist activists united by their opposition to the presidency of Boris Yeltsin. Hard-line nationalism was represented by a number of leading authors and ideologues, including Valentin Rasputin, Alexander Prokhanov and Igor Shafarevich. They were joined by former leading figures from the Soviet days such as General Albert Makashov and Colonel Viktor Alksnis and political figures including Sergey Baburin and Constitutional Democratic Party – Party of Popular Freedom leader Mikhail Astafyev. The co-chairmen of the movements were Baburin, Nikolay Pavlov (both Russian All-People's Union), Gennady Zyuganov (future leader of the Communist Party of the Russian Federation), Ilya Konstantinov, Astafyev, Valery Ivanov, Vladimir Isakov, Gennady Sayenko and Albert Makashov. The involvement of Zyuganov in the FNS helped to ensure that when he established his new Communist Party in 1993 it included a significant strain of nationalism in its ideology.

== Ideology ==
Shafarevich argued that the changes taking place in Russia were reminiscent of the settlement imposed on Germany after the First World War whilst Konstantinov, who chaired the group's organising committee, stated that the aims of the group were to oust Yeltsin as President, establish a new coalition government that would take control of prices, end the dismantling of the armaments industry and halt the removal of troops from the former Eastern Bloc states. Dyen, a right-wing nationalist journal edited by a number of nationalist intellectuals including Aleksandr Dugin (accused by Yeltsin of being anti-Semitic), threw its weight behind the FNS and functioned as the effective mouthpiece of the party. Dugin's ally Eduard Limonov made his National Bolshevik Party a constituent part of the FNS as well. As a result of Dugin and Limonov's involvement the FNS won the support of Belgian Third Positionist Jean-François Thiriart who established the European Liberation Front as a network of support groups across western Europe.

The group's combination of Soviet communism and militant Russian nationalism was not always a comfortable marriage, however. Amongst the founders was Nikolai Lysenko and his National Republican Party of Russia, a hard-line nationalist group that claimed to take its inspiration from Aleksandr Solzhenitsyn. However a leaflet produced by Lysenko containing virulently anti-Caucasian sentiment was criticised by a communist leader of the FNS, leading to Lysenko's party withdrawing from the Front in July 1993, with Lysenko dismissing the movement as too communist and internationalist.

== Clashes with Yeltsin ==
On 28 October 1992 Yeltsin declared the FNS as unconstitutional, effectively making the group the first to be outlawed since the collapse of communism. Konstantinov however argued that Yeltsin had overstepped his authority in doing so and stated that only a court could make such a pronouncement. The case was taken to the Constitutional Court, which overturned the ban on 12 February 1993.

The FNS was one of the leading groups involved in the 1993 Russian constitutional crisis. The group even announced during the crisis that they had established a shadow government and were preparing to take control from Yeltsin.

Several leading members of the group were arrested and held in Lefortovo Prison in the immediate aftermath of the unrest, whilst the Front, along with the Russian Communist Workers Party and Alexander Rutskoy's Free Russia Party, was barred from participating in the 1993 Duma elections. As a result of their non-participation the nationalist vote was dominated by the Liberal Democratic Party of Russia of Vladimir Zhirinovsky, who had taken no part in the FNS.

== Decline ==
The group began to fall apart in mid-1994 as a response to ethnic unrest in the North Caucasus. The leadership of the FNS attacked Yeltsin for what they saw as his heavy-handed response to ethnic separatism but ultra-nationalist leaders Limonov and Alexander Barkashov, the leader of the far-right Russian National Unity and an emerging political force at the time, praised what they saw as the decisiveness of Yeltsin, with Barkashov even offering Yeltsin the use of his street army for use in Chechnya.

In 1994, some former members of the front created two small nationalist organisations: one led by Valeri Smirnov and one led by Ilya Konstantinov.
