= Front of National Revolutionary Action =

Front of National Revolutionary Action Фронт национал-революционного действия
- Abbreviation: FNRD (English); ФНРД (Russian)
- Leader: Ilya Lazarenko
- Founders: Ilya Lazarenko; Alexey Shiropayev
- Founded: 11 November 1991 (SRM); 17 January 1993 (FNRD); 1 May 1996 (FNRD-PNF)
- Dissolved: 18 September 1999
- Succeeded by: Society of Nav'
- Headquarters: Moscow, Russia
- Newspaper: Nash Marsh (Our March); Narodniy stroy (People's system)
- Ideology: Russian ultranationalism Revolutionary nationalism Neo-Nazism; Strasserism; Russian imperialism
- Political position: Far-right
- National affiliation: National Salvation Front (1992); National Bolshevik Front (1993)
- International affiliation: NSDAP/AO
- Colours: Black; Yellow; White
- Slogan: "God, Empire, Labor!" (Russian: "Бог, Империя, Труд!")

Party flag

The Front of National Revolutionary Action (FNRD; Russian: Фронт национал-революционного действия; ФНРД; Фронт национал-революционного действия, FNRD) was a youth national-patriotic organization that existed in Russia at the end of the 20th century. Until the end of 1992, it was called the Union of Russian Youth (SRM).

== History ==
The predecessor of the FNRD, the Union of Russian Youth, was formed on 11 November 1991. Officially, this was to mark the birthday of Fyodor Dostoevsky; however, according to the members of the SRM, the day was chosen due to its proximity to the date of Hitler's beer hall putsch on 9 November. It was founded by leader Ilya Lazarenko and ideologue Alexey Shiropayev. At first, the Union of Russian Youth subscribed to typical Russian national-patriotic ideas of its time: Orthodox fundamentalism, antisemitism, and monarchism were preached in the ranks of the SRM while the Russian Empire and the White movement were glorified. But even at the time, the SRM stood out for its radicalism; the members of the SRM called themselves "monarcho-fascists" and criticized the White movement for the absence of a pogromist, Black Hundredist worldview.

The Union of Russian Youth did not have official registration, although attempts were made to register the organization. The social base of the organization were students and high-schoolers; any Russian young man no older than 25 could become a member of the SRM.

For a short period, the SRM was considered the youth branch of the Christian Revival Union (KhV), headed by Vladimir Osipov and Vyacheslav Demin, and also worked closely with the Russian Assembly, which was headed by taxi driver Igor Shcheglov, and Cossack organizations near Moscow.

The SRM did not organize its own actions (at least officially), but took an active part in many conservative events. These were mainly congresses, rallies, prayers, and processions held by the KhV Union and the Pamyat Society, as well as mass events organized by the Communist Party of the Soviet Union (for example, a rally for the preservation of the USSR on 23 February 1991 on Manezhnaya Square in Moscow).

Already in 1992, a disengagement with traditional Orthodox-monarchist organizations took place: the SRM declared itself the legal successor of the All-Russian Fascist Party and the All-Russian National Revolutionary Labor and Workers 'and Peasants' Party of Fascists, which operated in the 30-40s among the White émigrés. The name of the organization also changed; it was now called the Union of Russian Youth - National Revolutionary Action (SRM-NRD) (Russian: Союз русской молодёжи — Национал-революционное действие (СРМ-НРД)), and since January 1993, the Front of National Revolutionary Action (FNRD).

In January, the National Revolutionary Action Front was formed in Moscow - a Russian youth radical right-wing organization that involves cooperation with foreign national revolutionary movements defending the interests of white peoples. The FNRD has its own organ - the newspaper Nash marsh. It is focused on creating a Russian new conservative ideology that embodies Orthodox, national, and social ideals

— Den' newspaper, issue no. 3 (83), dated 17 January 1993

== Ideology and propaganda ==
The evolution of the group's name and ideology can be clearly traced in the newspaper Nash marsh, published by the organization since October 1992 with a circulation of up to 40,000 copies. The newspaper contained the first positive material about white power skinheads on the pages of Russian-language media. In the program articles "The Third Rus" by Ilya Lazarenko and "National Revolution" by Alexei Shiropayev, the authors disavow traditional Russian nationalists (from Pamyat and similar organizations) and proclaim themselves the "new right". The transition from an archaic ideology to a radical concept of a national revolution, against the background of failed liberal-market reforms in Russia in the early 1990s, attracted new members to the organization. The front is replenished its ranks not only with former members of allied and like-minded organizations (RNU, Werewolf Legion, Nash Sovremennik magazine, etc.), but also with radicals from the left camp. The organization contained ex-members of the Democratic Union, the Living Ring Union, and Labour Russia.

Claiming the role of an exponent of the so-called “intellectual fascism,” the FNRD attempted to develop the theoretical foundations of the modern right-wing radical movement; the “front's” newspaper also paid a lot of attention to the history of the European “third position” and the Russian fascist movement in emigration. As their ideological postulates, the leaders of the FNRD formulated the so-called “20 points” (see: newspaper Nash Marsh. 1993. No. 4 (6)) - a short catechism of Russian fascism, which included their views on racial and state problems, the internal structure of “future Russia”, etc.

— Shatilov A.B. ““Perestroika” and the formation of right-wing radicalism in Russia at the turn of the 1980-1990s”

The FNRD called on “nationally oriented youth to organize to fight against Jewish agitation, against the occupation regime.” The goal of the FNRD was to establish, through a Russian national revolution, a “Great National Socialist Russian Empire.” The leaders of the FNRD criticized Italian fascism (for “inconsistent racial policies”) and German Nazism (for preserving the capitalist system), calling for “total radicalism” and “national socialism of the Stalin-Strasser type” instead.

Lazarenko formulated the FNRD’s strategic program for the reconstruction of Russia:

- The state structure of Third Rus' will be based on a system of personal responsibility of leaders, with the absolute power of the Leader of the Nation.
- A cohort of leaders of different levels will make up the Elitism|National Elite, which will become hereditary.
- The rest of the population will be members of trade unions and national corporations, which are intended to become a means of controlling the "mass" in the hands of the leaders.
- The ruling idea of the Russian State will be the Russian National Revolutionary ideology and the doctrine of an armed nation.
- A person's duty to his ancestors and descendants is to keep his blood pure (doctrine of racial preference).
- Nationally proportional principle of representation in all spheres of public life.
- Planned economy. Transport, communications, basic industries, military-industrial complex, and banks in the hands of the state.|

Less grandiose plans were outlined in the populist "Political Principles" published in May 1993. An attempt was made again to register the organization, as evidenced by the Charter of the Front of National Revolutionary Action, dated 4 August 1993 - a document prepared for official registration and brought into compliance with the legislation of the Russian Federation in force at that time.

Around the same time in spring 1993, an unofficial supplement to the newspaper Nash marsh appeared - the samizdat mini-newspaper Listovochka, which from 1995 would be renamed into Oruzheiny plutony, and then (1997-2000) into Khuliganist. The editors of this publication emphasized their affiliation with the FNRD even after the formal termination of the organization's activities. In addition, the FNRD published several pamphlets: "Glory to Russia!", dedicated to the activities of the head of the Russian Fascist Party Konstantin Rodzaevsky; "The Ideology of German National Socialism"; "Letter to the Pope" by Léon Degrelle, and others.

== Symbols ==
The Charter of the Front of National Revolutionary Action sets out the following rules for the organization's symbols:

5.5. The front has its own symbolism - an emblem (Novgorod (Celtic) cross) and a banner, as well as an anthem.

5.6. The Front's badge bears its emblem and is issued at the time of admission to the FNRD. 5.7. The dress uniform of Front members is approved by the National Leadership (Note: According to the same document, the term “National Leadership” means the highest executive structure of the FPRD, elected by the Party Congress.) 5.8. For members of the Front there is a special form of addressing each other - “comrade-in-arms” (Russian: соратник)

5.9. Members of the Front greet each other by raising their right hands ("Roman salute") and the words "Glory to Russia!" or "Glory to Victory!"

Flag of the FNRD:

"The flag was a yellow cloth with a black cross (similar to the crosses on the naval flags of the Second and Third Reichs), and a Celtic cross in the Novgorod version was depicted in a white circle.”

The design of the FNRD symbols was developed by Shiropayev, an artist by training. For the Moscow (central) branch of the FNRD, five flags were made, four of which were lost for various reasons during the events of October 1993. In addition to these flags, the FNRD also used the black-yellow-white banners traditional for Russian nationalists.

== Actions, political unions, foreign contacts ==
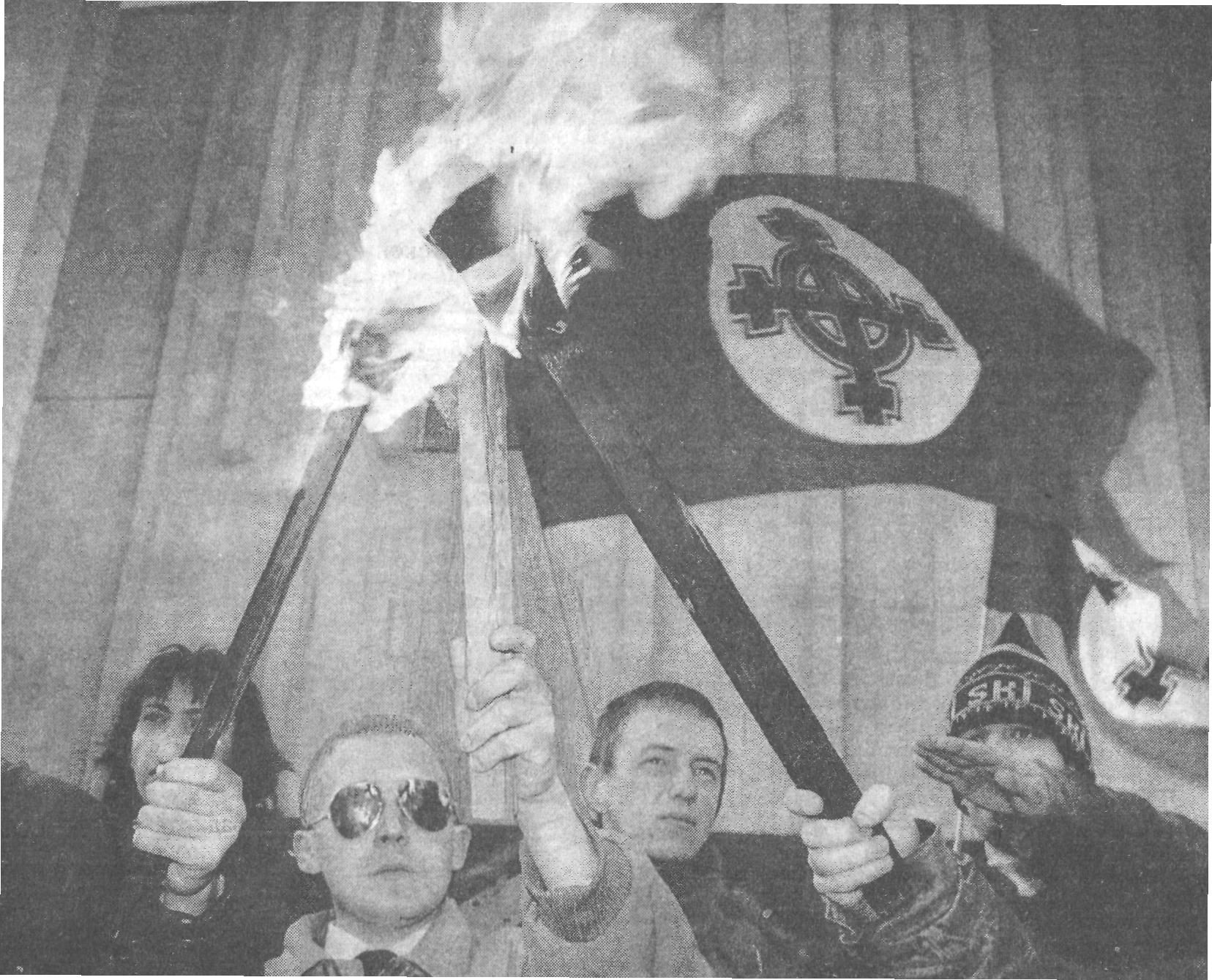
Flags of the FPRD-PNF at a rally on March 22, 1994 at the South African Embassy in Moscow.

Since its inception, the FNRD has been proclaimed a right-wing radical organization, implying cooperation with foreign organizations of a similar kind. The first of these organizations was the NSDAP/AO (Foreign Organization of the NSDAP). Later, NSDAP/AO leader Gary Lauck ended up in an Austrian prison. Photographs published by the media show that the wall in Lauck's prison cell was decorated with three newspapers: two published by him - the English-language New Order, the German-language NS Kampfruf - and the third - the Russian newspaper Nash marsh, published by Ilya Lazarenko, with a portrait of Anastasy Vonsiatsky on the front page. The FNRD had correspondence with the Ku Klux Klan and contacts with Western European, Serbian, Bulgarian, and other nationalists. One of the most notorious actions of the FNRD was the rally on 22 March 1994 at the Embassy of South Africa in Moscow against the dismantling of apartheid. Another well-known event of the FNRD-PNF is the annual Freedom for Texas event, event, which has been held in various forms on 14 February for over 12 years.

The FNRD was also looking for allies within Russia. At the end of 1992, the organization participated in the work of the National Salvation Front and in all actions of the Irreconcilable Opposition. The closest cooperation occurred between the FNRD and the Arctogaia publishing house, headed by Alexander Dugin: in February 1993, at the evening of the Elementy magazine, they proclaimed the creation of the New Right Movement.

On 1 May 1993, the New Right Movement, the FNRD, and the National Radical Party, led by Eduard Limonov, formed the National Bolshevik Front, which took part in the Irreconcilable Opposition march on 9 May 1993. However, the movement did not go further than this joint demonstration. Also on 1 May, members of the FNRD participated in clashes with riot police on Gagarinskaya Square on 1 May 1993.

== FNRD after 1993 ==
After the shooting of the White House and the defeat of the opposition, sanctions from the executive branch followed against the FNRD (as well as against many other organizations): by order of the Minister of Press and Information of the Russian Federation Vladimir Shumeyko No. 199 dated 14 October 1993, the newspaper Nash marsh was banned.

Guided by the Decree of the President of the Russian Federation No. 1400 dated 21 September 1993, stop the activities of the newspapers Den', Russkoye Delo, Russkoye voskresenye, Russkiye vedomosti, Russkiy Puls', Russkiy poryadok, Za Rus'!, Nash marsh, Natsionalist, Russkoye slovo, Moskovskiy traktir, Russkiy soyuz, K toporu, since their content is directly aimed at calls for a violent change in the constitutional system, inciting national hatred, propaganda of war, which became one of the factors that provoked the riots that took place in Moscow in September–October 1993. Printing houses and publishing complexes must stop publishing these newspapers.

However, taking advantage of the amnesty announced by the State Duma on 23 February 1994, the FNRD continued publishing the newspaper, but now under the name Narodnyy stroy. Subsequently, Narodnyy stroy was closed, and a criminal case was initiated against its editor Ilya Lazarenko for “inciting ethnic hatred”. In connection with the announcement of an amnesty dedicated to the 50th anniversary of the victory in the Great Patriotic War, he was granted amnesty.

New version of the flag

In 1994–1995, the Lazarenko's religious views changed sharply, which bewildered most members of the FNRD. In this regard, Lazarenko dissolved the FNRD and formed a completely new structure - the National Front Party (PNF), and then a new religious organization - the Navi Clan ("Holy Church of the White Race"). Despite this, for a long time in the media and reference books, Lazarenko's group continued to be called the Front of National Revolutionary Action. In addition, a group of associates (mostly Orthodox) continued to call themselves the FNRD.

The symbolism also changed somewhat: at the last stage of its existence, the FNRD, as well as its successor organizations, used red flags with a black Novgorod cross in a white circle in the center.

Despite religious differences, there was no talk of a political split between these groups: both of them participated in seminars "The Future of Russia" at Moscow State University in 1995, in the unifying congress of Russian radical organizations in 1998, and in the elections to the State Duma on the lists of the movement “For Faith and Fatherland” in 1999.

In 1998, on the eve of the National Front congress, Ilya Lazarenko officially transferred the right to use the name and symbols of the FNRD to Mikhail Moiseyev, a member of the SRM-FNRD since 1992. The National Revolutionary Action Front, thus revived, took part in the work of the congress as a collective member, representing the Orthodox wing of the movement. The last known action organized by the FNRD (together with the PNF) was an evening in memory of Baron Roman von Ungern-Sternberg at the Mayakovsky Museum on 18 September 1999.
