= Dmitri Dmitriyevich Vasilyev =

Soviet-Russian activist; leader of Pamyat (1988–2003)

Dmitry Vasilyev
- Дмитрий Васильев
- Born: 30 May 1945; Kirov, Russian SFSR, Soviet Union
- Died: July 16, 2003 (aged 58); Kriushkino, Yaroslavl Oblast, Russia
- Years active: 1984–2003
- Known for: Russian monarchism and ultranationalism, Antisemitism, founder of Pamyat
- Political party: Pamyat

Dmitri Dmitriyevich Vasilyev (Russian: Дмитрий Дмитриевич Васильев; 30 May 1945 – 16 July 2003) was a Soviet-Russian actor, monarchist, and ultranationalist who was chairman of Pamyat from 1988 until his death in 2003.

== Early life ==
Throughout his career, Vasilyev did not disclose his father's surname; when asked why he did so, he claimed that it was due to his aristocratic association, saying, "My mother did not take care of me so that I would perish." His grandfather was a Cossack ataman who was killed by the Bolsheviks during the Russian Civil War. Many other paternal relatives of his also suffered in the Gulag system.

He first studied at the Moscow Art Theatre School, after which he was conscripted into the Soviet Army, where he served as a tanker. Vasilyev carried out his military service in Hungary. Following his military service, he returned to acting; he played the minor role of Pyotr Stolypin in Sergei Gerasimov's final film, Lev Tolstoy.

== Political career ==
Vasilyev was active in Pamyat from 1984, when it was still an organisation of amateur historians. When it split the next year, he, along with his supporters, formed the National Patriotic Front "Memory", which would eventually be recognised as the primary successor organisation to the original Pamyat. However, the new Pamyat was no group of historians, but instead a far-right nationalist, monarchist, and antisemitic group. In 1992, Vasilyev was appointed "voivode" of Pamyat.

In terms of his political positions, Vasilyev was an ardent monarchist, supporting the restoration of the House of Romanov. He was considered to be a staunch antisemite, though he refused such accusations (due to Arabs being a Semitic group), and instead simply said that he was an anti-Zionist, claiming that Zionism was the desire of Jews to take over the world with the assistance of freemasons. Vasilyev also viewed communism and Judaism as related. From the dissolution of the Soviet Union in 1991, he called himself a fascist openly, claiming that Adolf Hitler and Benito Mussolini were not "true" fascists, and that the Russian Empire was an example of "true" fascism.

During the 1993 Russian constitutional crisis, Vasilyev, unlike many other figures on the Russian far-right (including his former ally Alexander Barkashov), supported President Boris Yeltsin over the Supreme Soviet and Alexander Rutskoy. Throughout the 1990s, he campaigned in multiple elections; in 1995, he ran for the State Duma, and in 1997, he sought election as Mayor of Moscow. Neither of these campaigns would be successful, and he eventually stormed the offices of Moskovskij Komsomolets, demanding an end to the printing of "immoral and Russophobic materials." In 1999, during the Kosovo War, Vasilyev also supported Slobodan Milošević, and called for Russia to intervene against NATO forces, which were bombing Serbia at the time. After 1999, Vasilyev disappeared from the public sphere until his death.

== Personal life ==
Vasilyev had an interest in heraldry and classical music, particularly Pyotr Ilyich Tchaikovsky and Richard Wagner. He married, but would outlive his wife, eventually adopting her two children. His son, Sergei, is part of the Central Council of Pamyat. Following the collapse of the original Pamyat in 1985, Vasilyev claimed that Ilya Glazunov's most famous works were actually replicas of his own photographs. On 16 July 2003, Vasilyev died at his dacha in Kriushkino, a village in Yaroslavl Oblast, of a heart attack at the age of 58.
