= National Republican Party of Russia =

National Republican Party of Russia Национально-республиканская партия России
- Abbreviation: NRPR (English); НРПР (Russian)
- Leader: Nikolay Lysenko
- Founded: 8 April 1990 (as RPPR); 31 October 1991 (as NRPR)
- Dissolved: 31 December 1998
- Split from: NPF "Pamyat"
- Succeeded by: Freedom Party
- Headquarters: Saint Petersburg, Russia
- Paramilitary wing: Russian National Legion
- Ideology: Solzhenitsynism; Russian ultranationalism Orthodox Christian nationalism Socialist market economy Mononationalism; Anti-internationalism; Anti-cosmopolitanism; Anti-atheism; Anti-communism; Anti-Caucasian sentiment Anti-Yeltsinism
- Political position: Far-right
- Coalition: National Salvation Front (until July 1993)
- Colours: Black; Gold; White

The National Republican Party of Russia (NRPR; Russian: Национально-республиканская партия России; НРПР; Natsionalno-respublikanskaya partiya Rossii, NRPR), before 1991 Republican People's Party of Russia (RPPR; Russian: Республиканская народная партия России; РНПР; Respublikanskaya narodnaya partiya Rossii, RNPR), was a far-right nationalist party in Russia, founded in 1990 in Leningrad by Nikolai Lysenko. It was one of the most prominent Russian radical nationalist organizations of the time. It advocate the construction of a unitary state and a mono-national society in Russia with a "Chinese-style" economy, with the mandatory suppression of all forms of "cosmopolitism" and "internationalism".

The militants of the National Republican Party of Russia who formed the Russian National Legion took part in the War in Transnistria on the side of the separatists and the Yugoslav wars on the Serbian side. 6 party members were killed in the war. The party belonged to the united national-communist National Salvation Front. The National Republican Party could not participate in the 1993 State Duma election as it failed to gather the necessary 6 000 signatures of supporters but its leader Lysenko ran in the Engels single-mandate constituency and was elected to the State Duma. At the 4th party congress on 3 December 1994 the party split into two factions. In 1995 the party run in the State Duma election but disintegrated after the arrest of Nikolay Lysenko in 1996. NRPR was officially de-registered on 31 December 1998. The Yuri Belyayev faction re-registered in 2000 as the new far-right Freedom Party.
