= Pamyat =

Russian ultranationalist organization (1980–2021)

National Patriotic Front "Memory" Национально-патриотический фронт «Память»
- Abbreviation: NPF "Pamyat" (English); НПФ «Память» (Russian)
- Leader: Dmitri Vasilyev (1988–2003); Nikolay Skorodumov (2003–2021)
- Founder: Dmitri Vasilyev
- Founded: 1980
- Dissolved: 10 June 2021
- Preceded by: Vityaz
- Headquarters: Moscow
- Newspaper: Pamyat
- Membership: 3,000
- Ideology: Russian nationalism Monarchism (Russian); Antisemitism
- Political position: Far-right
- Religion: Russian Orthodoxy
- Colours: Black; Gold; White
- Slogan: "God! Tsar! Nation!" (Russian: "Бог! Царь! Нация!")

Party flag

The symbol of NPF "Pamyat" with the "Russian swastika"

The National Patriotic Front "Memory" (NPF "Memory"; Russian: Национально-патриотический фронт «Память»; НПФ «Память», also known as the Pamyat Society; Russian: Общество «Память», Russian: Obshchestvo «Pamyat», Russian pronunciation: [ˈpamʲɪtʲ]) was a Russian far-right antisemitic, and monarchist organization.

Pamyat, which was founded in 1980 and was based in Moscow, stated its focus was preserving Russian culture. Its longtime leader, Dmitri Dmitriyevich Vasilyev, died in 2003. The group had disappeared by the 1990s and split into groups like Russian National Unity.

== History ==
At the end of the 1970s, the amateur historical and cultural association Vityaz (Витязь, lit. 'Knight') was established by public activists from the Moscow branch of the Society for the Protection of Historical and Cultural Monuments. One of the purposes of the newly formed association was to prepare for the upcoming celebration of the 600th anniversary of the Battle of Kulikovo.

Some notable Vityaz activists in Moscow were Ilya Glazunov and V. Kuznetsov (artists), S. Malyshev (historian), A. Lebedev and A. Lobzov (Colonels of the MVD), G. Frygin (Minaviaprom engineer), Vyacheslav and Yevgeny Popov (musicians), and K. Andreyev (locksmith). Similar groups were created in other regions of the Soviet Union.

Vityaz and some other informal groups founded Pamyat as a public organization in Moscow in 1980. Pamyat took its name from the famous essay novel of the same name by Vladimir Chivilikhin.

Paul Klebnikov, in his book The Godfather of the Kremlin, Boris Berezovsky, or the Story of the Plundering of Russia, refers to Oleg Kalugin and writes that "the nationalist group Pamyat… was formed with the help of the KGB."

At an internal meeting on October 4, 1985, Pamyat split into several factions, many of which attempted to retain the same name as the "true" Pamyat. One of them, the so-called Vasilyev's group, led by Dmitri Vasilyev (a former worker in Glazunov's studio), A. Andreyev, and A. Gladkov, focused its activities on the media.

By the end of 1986, Pamyat's leaders claimed to be the main ideologues of the emerging Russian nationalist movement.

On May 6, 1987, Pamyat activists conducted an unregistered and illegal demonstration on Manezhnaya Square in Moscow in support of perestroika and to demand the end to the construction of an officially sanctioned memorial project at Poklonnaya Hill. The event met little repression from the authorities, and the participants met with Boris Yeltsin, then First Secretary of the Moscow City Committee of the CPSU, who listened to them attentively and promised to take into account their wishes.

In 1986–1987, other organizations named Pamyat were formed in cities in the RSFSR. The growth of Memory's ranks was accompanied by numerous conflicts between its founders and leaders.

In the fall of 1987, the National-Patriotic Front (NPF) was founded with the aim of "renaissance", with the intent to "lead Russian people to the spiritual and national revival" based on "three traditional Russian values": Orthodoxy, national character and spirituality.

In 1987–1989, Pamyat was split into several groups, which had in common only a belief in the existence of a worldwide "Zionomasonic conspiracy" and the Pamyat name. By the early 1990s, several organizations bore this name, including:

- National Patriotic Front "Pamyat" (Dmitry Vasilyev)
- National Patriotic Front "Pamyat" (Nikolai Filimonov - I. Kvartalov)
- Orthodox National Patriotic Front "Pamyat" (A Kulakov - Sergei Vorotyntsev)
- Russian People's Democratic Front - Movement "Pamyat" (Igor Sychev)
- Union for National Proportional Representation "Pamyat" (Konstantin Smirnov-Ostashvili)
- World Anti-Zionist and Anti-Masonic Front "Pamyat" (Valery Yemelyanov)
- Coordinating Council of the Patriotic Movement "Pamyat" (brothers Vyacheslav and Yevgeny Popov)
- Russian Assembly "Pamyat" (Igor Shcheglov)

After several splits and the imminent dissolution of the Soviet Union, the organization adopted a monarchist position.

In August 1990, a permanent NPF council member, Aleksandr Barkashov (the author of The ABC of a Russian Nationalist), caused another split after he announced being "tired to be preoccupied by recollections". He said that "it is time to act". His new group was dubbed "Russian National Unity" (Русское Национальное Единство). Barkashov promoted the veneration of the swastika.

In addition, in 1990, the following broke away from Dmitry Vasilyev's NPF "Pamyat":

- National Republican Party of Russia (Nikolai Lysenko)
- National Social Union (Viktor Yakushev)

According to writer Valery Shambarov, the plurality of Pamyat organizations was organized by the 5th Directorate (ideological) of the KGB of the USSR with the involvement of the CPSU MGK in order to discredit the organization of Dmitry Vasilyev.

In 1991, the organization's newspaper (print run of 100,000) and radio station (both officially registered) were launched.

By the late 1990s, the original Pamyat disappeared from the public scene. Dmitry Vasilyev died on July 17, 2003. The organization reactivated in 2005 and participated in the Russian marches.

On September 1, 2021, it became known about the death of Nikolai Skorodumov: according to a post by Vladimir Basmanov on the Vkontakte social network, Nikolai Skorodumov died on June 10, 2021, at the age of 70 in a Zelenograd hospital.

== Ideology ==
The recurring motive in the group's ideology was the claim of the existence of a so-called "Ziono-Masonic plot" against Russia as "the main source of the misfortunes of Russian people, disintegration of the economy, denationalization of Russian culture, alcoholism, ecological crisis" (according to Pamyat). The Zionists were also blamed for the triggering of the revolutions in 1905 and 1917, the death of millions in the course of the Russian Civil War and for Joseph Stalin's personality cult. The contemporary Soviet government apparatus was alleged to be infiltrated by "Zionists and freemasons" working as "agents of Zionism" and serving the purpose of subordinating the Soviet government to the "Jewish capital". The "Zionist Occupation Government" accusation was often used by Pamyat.

In 1993, a District Court in Moscow formally ruled that The Protocols of the Elders of Zion were a fake, and dismissed a libel suit by Pamyat. The organization was criticized for using the document in their publications.

The group disappeared by the 1990s and was split into other groups like The National Patriotic Front and The Russian National Unity.

== Quotes ==
From the open letter of the NPF "Pamyat" leader D. Vasilyev to the President of the Russian Federation Boris Yeltsin:

"... Your Jewish entourage... have already made good use of you and don't need you anymore. You will share the destiny of Napoleon, Hitler, etc. who were Zionist-maintained dictators... The aim of international Zionism is to seize power worldwide. For this reason Zionists struggle against national and religious traditions of other nations, and for this purpose they devised the Freemasonic concept of cosmopolitanism."

From the open letter of the NPF "Pamyat" leader D. Vasilyev to the President of the Russian Federation Vladimir Putin:

"Mr. President, your initiative to make taxes lower meets our demands. It is a positive step. Unfortunately, modern economy is an economy of national minority, which oppresses the majority. They are real suckers of our money, mineral resources etc.
Banks should not sell money and make it some kind of tradable good. They should serve the production sphere of economy. We are against a multiparty political system. Many parties mean distribution of egoism, blackmail etc. Russia has its own history, which is 1000 years old. It makes no sense to copy the western institutions in toto. They might be positive and efficient in small European countries, but in such a big country like Russia a weak, corrupted parliamentarian system means anarchy and fosters economic and politic separatism."

== See also ==
- Anti-Zionist Committee of the Soviet Public

== Sources ==
- Korey, William. "Russian Antisemitism, Pamyat, and the Demonology of Zionism". Hebrew University of Jerusalem.
- Shambarov, Valery (2020). "Глава 9. Сдача позиций" [Chapter 9. Surrender of positions]. Предательство в КПСС. Хроника разрушения СССР [Betrayal in the CPSU. Chronicle of the destruction of the USSR] (in Russian). Moscow: Rodina. ISBN 978-5-907332-17-1.
