= Alexander Barkashov =

Russian far-right leader (born 1953)

- Александр Баркашов
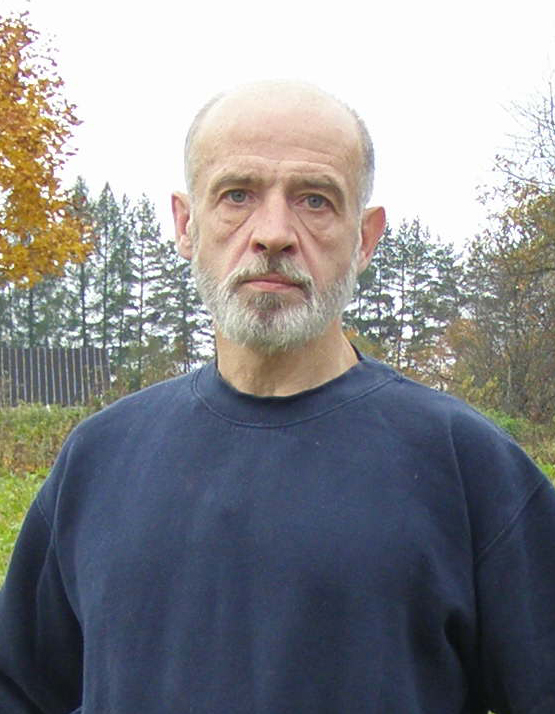
- Barkashov in 2008
- Born: 6 October 1953 (age 73); Moscow, Russian SFSR, Soviet Union
- Citizenship: Russia
- Known for: Russian neo-Nazi activist
- Works: The ABC of a Russian Nationalist
- Political party: Russian National Unity

Alexander Petrovich Barkashov (Russian: Александр Петрович Баркашов; born 6 October 1953) is a Russian political leader and far-right nationalist who in 1990 founded Russian National Unity, a neo-fascist paramilitary organization.

== Biography ==
On 16 October 1990, Barkashov and a few dozen followers gathered at his home on Moscow's Dubinin Street and founded "the National Unity for a Free Strong Just Russia" (soon shortened to "the Russian National Unity", and informally among the Barkashovtsy [Barkashovites]: "the Unity" [Yedinstvo]). Historian Walter Laqueur writes that Barkashov stated in an interview that he is a Nazi.

During the Russian constitutional crisis of 1993, Barkashov led RNU fighters in their defense of the Russian White House against Boris Yeltsin's forces. Escaping arrest by fleeing Moscow, Barkashov took refuge in a nearby dacha. Shot in the thigh during an evening stroll, Barkashov was brought to a hospital, where a nurse recognized him. Barkashov was imprisoned on charges of organizing and inciting mass disorder and illegally bearing arms. In early 1994, the newly elected Duma granted amnesty to Barkashov.

In 1994, Barkashov published his book, Azbuka russkogo natsionalista (ABC of a Russian Nationalist), which became the primary source of the RNU's platform.

At the end of February 1999, one opinion poll ranked Barkashov as one of Russia's 10 most recognizable politicians. On 2 December 2005 Barkashov together with three of his followers was detained and arrested for "attacking a police officer". According to the press-release of the RNU,

On 6 November 2009 Barkashov formed the movement ″Union of the Defenders of Russia - October 1993″ together with Vladislav Achalov and Stanislav Terekhov, the leader of the Union of Officers.

During the Russo-Ukrainian War, Barkashov actively supports the Russian-backed separatists. In a leaked audio recording from spring 2014, Barkashov consulted Dmitri Boitsov, the leader of the Russian Orthodox Army. According to Barkahsov's words, his own son fought with a column of pro-Russian fighters against Ukraine.

== General references ==
- Russian Fascism: Traditions, Tendencies, Movements by Stephen D. Shenfield (M. E. Sharpe, 2001, ISBN 0-7656-0634-8 and ISBN 0-7656-0635-6).
- The Beast Reawakens by Martin A. Lee (1997, Little, Brown and Company, ISBN 0-316-51959-6), chapter eight: "Shadow Over the East"
