= Derzhava (Russian party) =

Social Patriotic Movement «Derzhava» Социал-патриотическое движение «Держава»
- Leader: Konstantin Zatulin
- Founder: Alexander Rutskoy
- Founded: 4 February 1995
- Dissolved: 7 September 1999
- Split from: Liberal Democratic Party of Russia
- Preceded by: National Salvation Front; Russian Christian Democratic Movement; Russian Social Democratic People's Party
- Merged into: Fatherland – All Russia
- Headquarters: 30th building, Miklukho-Maklaya Street, Moscow, Russia. 117837
- Ideology: Russian nationalism Social conservatism Patriotism; Social patriotism Right-wing populism Pan-Slavism
- Political position: Right-wing
- National affiliation: People's Patriotic Union of Russia
- Colours: Grey
- Slogan: "We put things order and provide a decent life!" (Russian: "Мы наведём порядок и обеспечим достойную жизнь!")

The Social Patriotic Movement "Derzhava" (Derzhava; Russian: Социал-патриотическое движение «Держава»; Sotsial-patrioticheskoye dvizheniye «Derzhava») was a Russian populist, nationalist party founded by Alexander Rutskoy. It was originally created as a faction in the State Duma in the summer of 1994 by six members of the Liberal Democratic Party of Russia.
