= Russian Fascism: Traditions, Tendencies, Movements =

2001 book

- Author: Stephen D. Shenfield
- Language: English
- Publisher: M. E. Sharpe, Routledge
- Publication date: 2000
- Media type: Print (hardcover, paperback), e-book
- Pages: 324 pages
- ISBN: 0-76560635-6
- OCLC: 44669697

Russian Fascism: Traditions, Tendencies, Movements is a 2001 book by Stephen D. Shenfield.

== Synopsis ==
Russian Fascism is an analysis of fascism, its manifestations in Russian political and cultural history, and fascist tendencies and movements in contemporary Russia. It examines the likelihood that Russia would follow the same path as Weimar Germany.

== Publication ==
The book was first published in 2000 through M. E. Sharpe as a 324-page hardcover and was given a paperback release by the same company in 2001. In 2015, Routledge issued a second edition of the work in hardback and e-book formats.

== Reception ==
In Science & Society, Irina Mukhina criticized Shenfield's definition of fascism in Russian Fascism, as she felt that "While Shenfield's definition of fascism, supported by abundant empirical evidence, is useful for the analysis of organizations that appear to be undeniably fascist, this definition and its usage become problematic when the author evaluates Russia's fascist traditions and tendencies. A. James Gregor, in Slavic Review, also voiced concerns over the definition while also noting that it was "among the first of the serious works that undertake a comparative study of "fascism" in the former Soviet Union."

Sven Gunnar Simonsen reviewed the text for the Journal of Peace Research, praising Shenfield for his patience in discussing a wide topic and "for intelligently addressing the important question of whether Stalin, and today's Communist Party under leader Gennady Zuganov, may be described as Fascist." Andreas Umland noted that the book was "pioneering in at least two regards", stating that one of them was "a serious attempt to integrate his research on the Russian extreme right into the field of comparative fascist study."

== See also ==
- Putinism
- Rashism
