= Russian nationalism =

Russian political ideology

The flag of Russia.

Russian nationalism (Russian: Русский национализм) first rose to prominence as a Pan-Slavic enterprise during the 19th century Russian Empire, and was repressed during the early Bolshevik rule. Russian nationalism was briefly revived through the policies of Joseph Stalin during and after the Second World War, which shared many resemblances with the worldview of early Eurasianist ideologues.

The definition of Russian national identity within Russian nationalism has been characterized in different ways. One characterisation, based on ethnicity, asserts that the Russian nation is constituted by ethnic Russians, while another, the All-Russian nation, which developed in the Russian Empire, views Russians as having three sub-national groups within it, including Great Russians (those commonly identified as ethnic Russians today), Little Russians (Ukrainians), and White Russians (Belarusians). In the Eurasianist perspective, Russia is a distinctive civilization separate from both Europe and Asia, and includes ethnic non-Russians of Turkic and other Asiatic cultures.

== History ==
=== Russian Empire ===
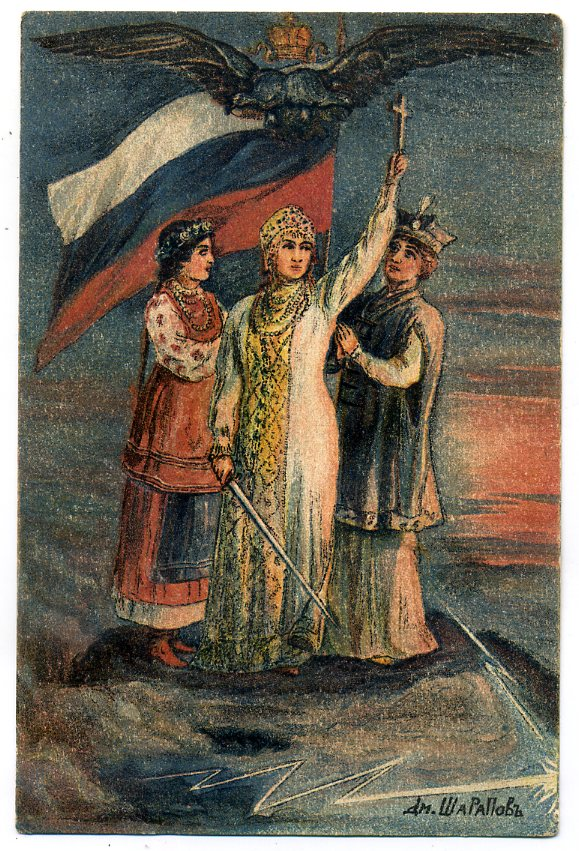
Allegory of triune All-Russian nation that views the Russian nation as having three sub-nations within it: Great Russians (those commonly identified as ethnic Russians today), Little Russians (Ukrainians), and White Russians (Belarusians) from an early 20th century poster.

Prior to the 19th century, Russian Empire functioned as a multi-ethnic empire based on dynastic legitimization, tsarist autocracy, and estate-based order. Despite the Russian people being the "state people" in the empire, and the imperial patriotism integrating many elements of Russian ethnic consciousness, such as the Russian orthodoxy, history and culture, Russian Empire was not a Russian nation state and it possessed many supranational traits. In the 19th century, Russian Empire began to be affected by the rise of nationalism among its peoples, including Russians. The modern Russian national consciousness first arose in the 18th century in reaction to westernizing reforms and growing foreign influence under Peter the Great, and it was influenced by the Enlightenment and Romanticism. A noble intelligentsia, which gradually detached itself from the nobility, increasingly began to emphasize Russian language, history and people instead of state and religion. They sought to mobilize and integrate lower classes and proclaimed national loyalty above loyalty to a ruler, which put them at odds with tsarist autocratic system. They attempted to bridge the gap between the traditional folk culture and the westernized high culture of the Russian elites with the ethnically based national consciousness. This phase of Russian national movement saw the creation of a standartized literary language and Russian literature, the publication of folk poetry and historical works.

The imperial patriotism and nationalism first mingled during the "Patriotic War" against Napoleon. This led to the emergence of Russian national conservatism which was prominently espoused by Nikolay Karamzin. He imagined Russian Empire as a Russian nation state and criticized concessions made by Alexander I of Russia to Poland. This type of Russian nationalism was loyal to the state and emerged powerfully in reaction to the Polish uprising of 1830. The Russian motto "Orthodoxy, Autocracy, and Nationality" was coined by Count Sergey Uvarov and it was adopted as the official ideology by Emperor Nicholas I. Three components of Uvarov's triad were:

- Orthodoxy – Orthodox Christianity and the protection of the Russian Orthodox Church.
- Autocracy – unconditional loyalty to the House of Romanov in return for paternalist protection for all social estates.
- Nationality (Narodnost, has also been translated as national spirit).

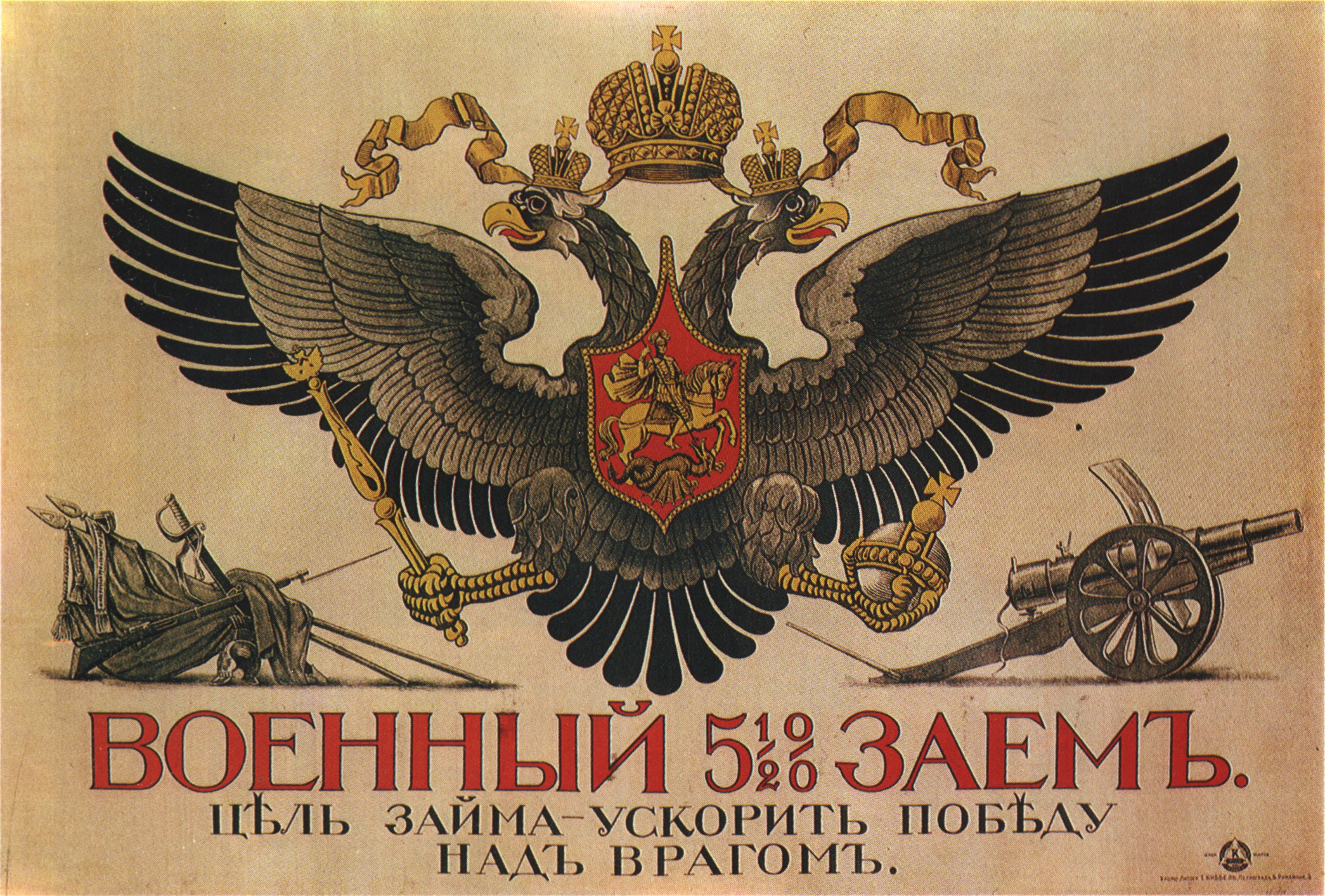
Russian World War I era poster calling to buy war bonds

Many works concerning Russian history, mythology and fairy tales appeared. Operas by Nikolai Rimsky-Korsakov, Mikhail Glinka and Alexander Borodin; paintings by Viktor Vasnetsov, Ivan Bilibin and Ilya Repin; and poems by Nikolay Nekrasov, Aleksey Konstantinovich Tolstoy, among others, are considered masterpieces of Russian romantic nationalism.

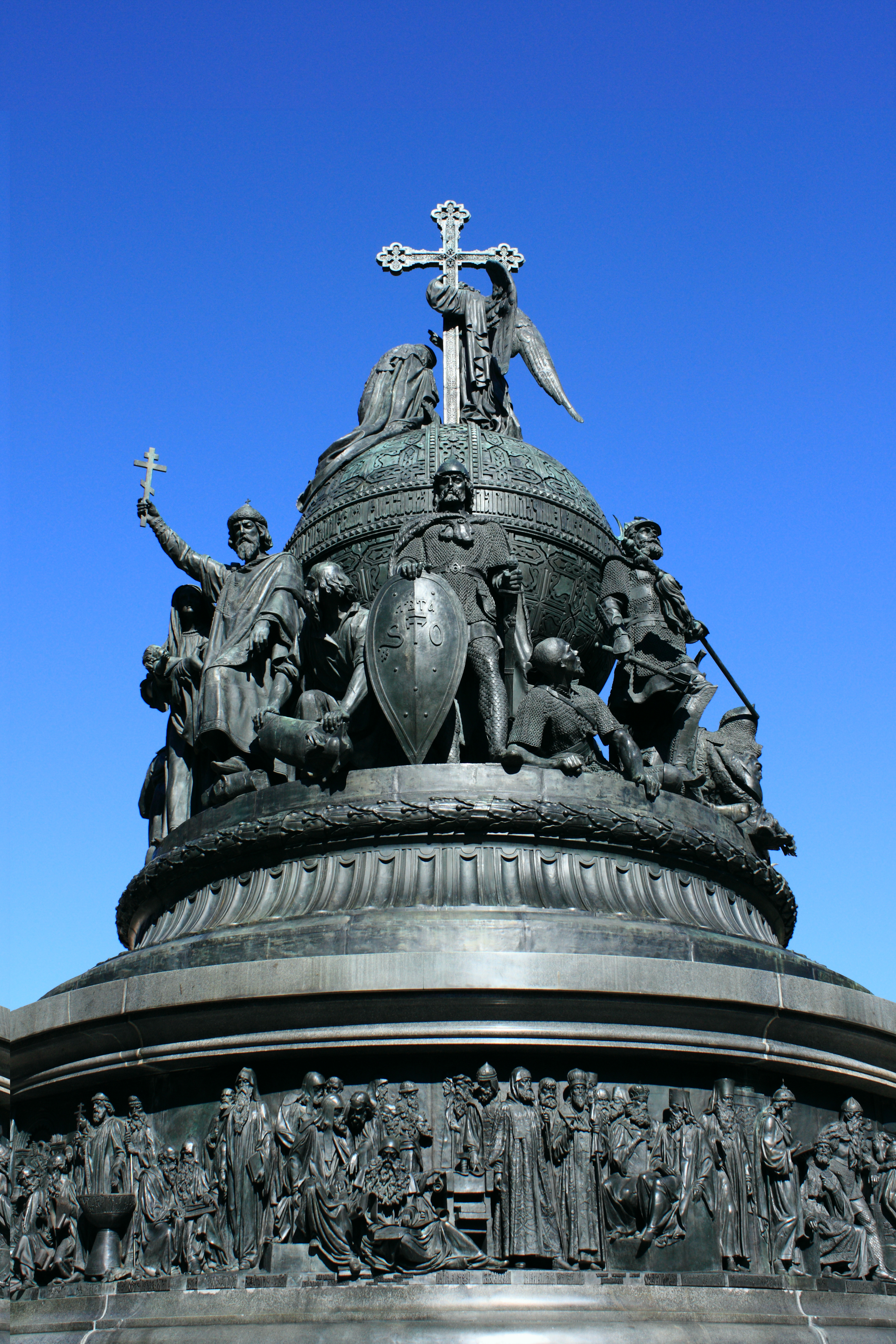
The Millennium of Russia monument built in 1862 that celebrated one-thousand years of Russian history

However, the main goal of the government remained to preserve the status quo and traditional legitimization of the multi-ethnic empire, with "narodnost" being used in rather vague way and the Orthodox religion and autocracy remaining the main elements. After 1815, increasingly large part of the Russian intelligentsia turned away from the state, and based their nationalism on societal and political demands. Decembrists, who staged an uprising in 1825, already emphasized the goal of making Russia a democratic and centralist nation state based on French model. Subsequently two main branches of Russian nationalism emerged: Slavophiles and Westernizers. Slavophiles argued for the return to the Orthodox Church and they idealized the Rus' before Peter the Great. The Westernizers, on the other hand, pushed for liberal reforms. Both idealized the Russian peasants and their commune constitution, and favored the abolition of serfdom. They also both assigned to Russia a messianic role among European nations.

Pan-Slavism and the Slavophile movement of the 19th century, led by such figures as Aleksey Khomyakov, Sergey Aksakov, and Ivan Kireyevsky drew a line between Western Europe and Russia, emphasizing Russia as a dominant regional power as well as spiritual unity among Slavs in their Orthodox religion, of which the Russian autocratic regime was the ultimate expression. However, their movement was suppressed by Tsar Nicholas I, a law and order royalist, who surveilled and suppressed the Slavophiles. The movement was only revived in the 1870s by Konstantin Leontiev and Nikolay Danilevsky.

The political situation in Russia after the defeat in Crimean War, abolition of serfdom, political reforms and Polish January Uprising increasingly radicalized starting from the 1860s, which also affected the Russian nationalist movement. The radical movement of narodniks contained an apparently national streak in its idealization of Russian peasants and their repartitional communes. The liberals pushed for democratization of Russia, and attacked special status that some non-Russian peoples were granted in the western part of the empire. The aftermath of Polish uprising of 1863 also saw the emergence of extreme Russian nationalism loyal to the state. This was represented by Mikhail Katkov, who promoted an imperialist foreign policy based on pan-Slavism, which also found its expression in Nikolay Danilevsky's book Russia and Europe. The extreme Russian nationalists argued for integral nationalism and assimilation of non-Russian peoples in the empire. The revolutionary movements in Russia began to gradually abandon nationalism in the second half of the 19th century, with democratic intelligentsia increasingly seeing less emancipatory and democratic potential in the nationalism.

Russian government remained skeptical of all branches of Russian national movement, seeing them as a challenge to traditional autocratic tsarist system. However, the revolutions of 1848 showed the Russian government the power of the national principle. The nationalist currents also spread into the bureaucracy and the army and among the policymakers. Faced with challenge of the revolutionary movements in Russia and growing nationalism of non-Russian peoples, Russian government ultimately decided to increasingly cooperate with extreme Russian nationalists after 1863, and especially after 1881. The imperial patriotism mingled with extreme Russian nationalism. This period sought increasing concessions to extreme Russian nationalists, even if relations between tsarist state and Russian nationalism still remained ambivalent. The aggressive "imperial nationalism" emanated from the imperial patriotism as the state was forced to respond to the growing national challenge. The traditional dynastic and estate-based imperial patriotism appeared less capable of dealing with the growing challenges, and the imperial authorities sought to deal with them by seeking to use the integrational power of Russian nationalism, even if they remained skeptical of Russian national movement. This culminated in the policy of Russification pursued by the Russian Empire in the end of the 19th century, with the goal of systematization and standardization of the empire. The goal was to use nationalism to stabilize the tsarist rule. Russian authorities sought to emulate the policies pursued by other multi-ethnic empires: the Germanization in the German Empire and Magyarization in Hungary after the Austro-Hungarian Compromise of 1867. However, the tsarist policy continued to favor the traditional estate-based and dynastic legitimation, and thus Russification policy was implemented with varying intensity and uniformity.

In the beginning of 20th century, new nationalist and rightist organizations and parties emerged in Russia, such as the Russian Assembly, the Union of the Russian People, the Union of Archangel Michael ("Black Hundreds") and others.

=== Soviet era ===
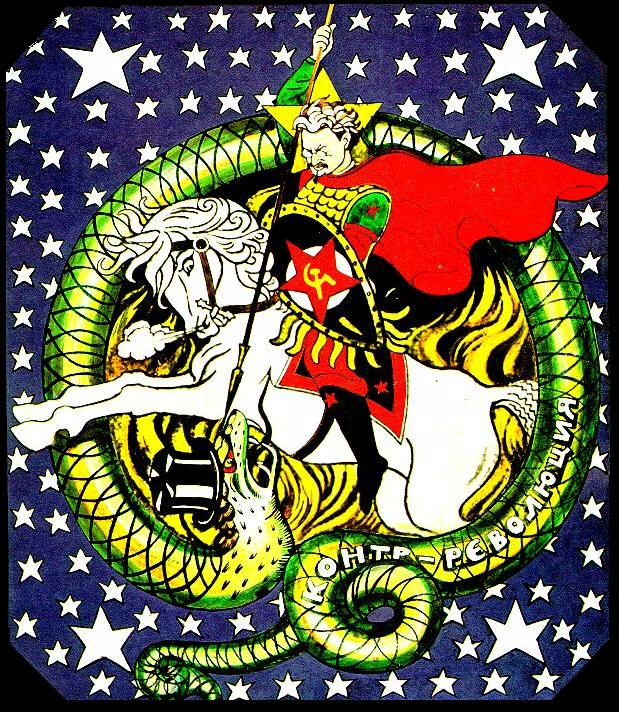
Bolshevik propaganda poster from the Russian Civil War with an allusion of Saint George and the Dragon with Red Army leader Leon Trotsky as being a Saint George figure who was slaying the dragon which represented counter-revolution. The symbol of Saint George slaying the dragon was and still is a Russian national symbol.

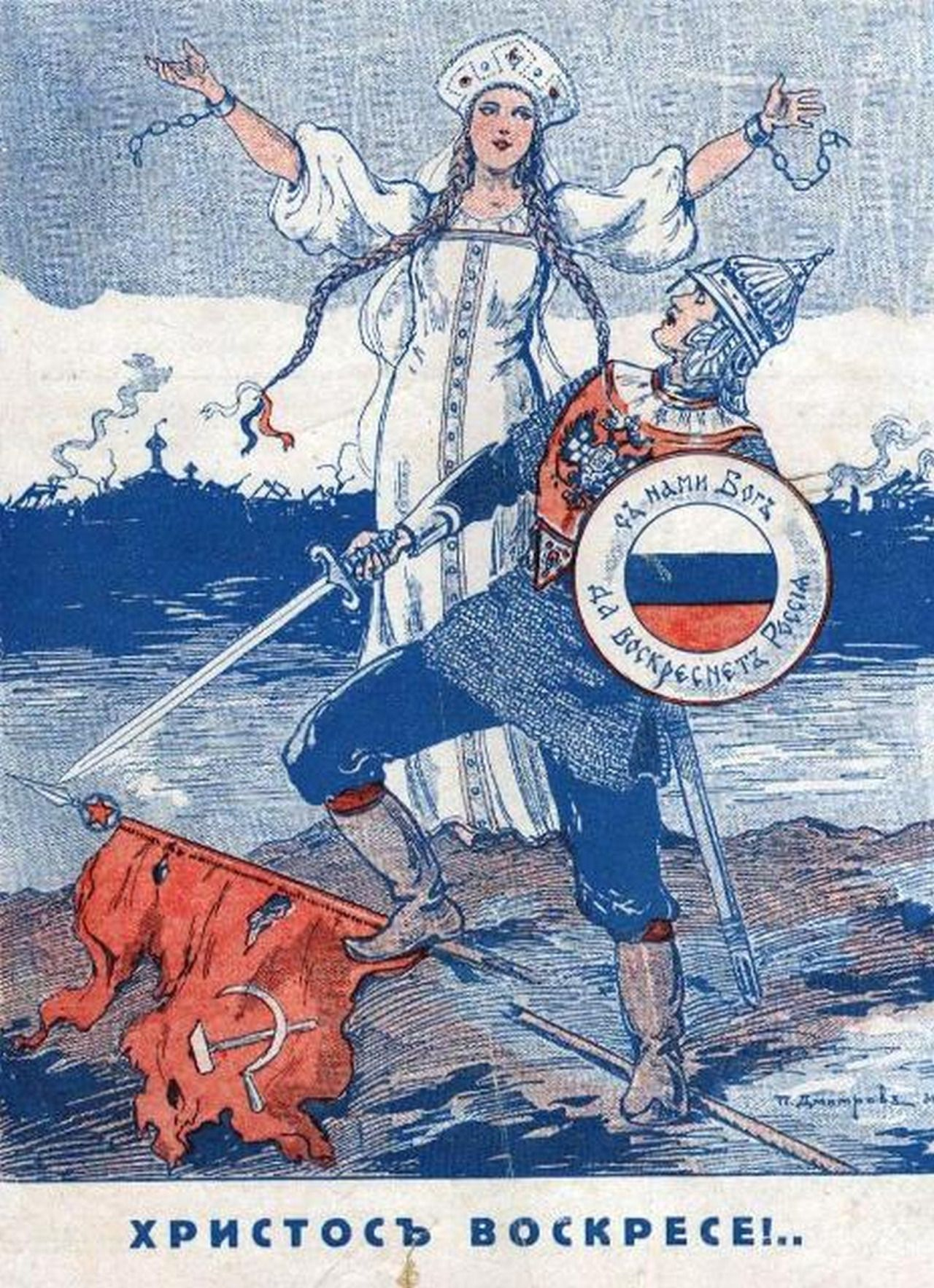
White Russian anti-Soviet poster, c. 1932, depicting the female personification of Russia known as Mother Russia

Under the outlook of international communism that was especially strong at the time, Vladimir Lenin separated patriotism into what he defined as proletarian, socialist patriotism from bourgeois nationalism. Lenin promoted the right of all nations to self-determination and the right to unity of all workers within nations, but he also condemned chauvinism and claimed there were both justified and unjustified feelings of national pride. Lenin explicitly denounced conventional Russian nationalism as "Great Russian chauvinism", and his government sought to accommodate the country's multiple ethnic groups by creating republics and sub-republic units to provide non-Russian ethnic groups with autonomy and protection from Russian domination. Lenin also sought to balance the ethnic representation of leadership of the country by promoting non-Russian officials in the Communist Party of the Soviet Union to counter the large presence of Russians in the Party. However, even during this early period of Soviet history, the Soviet government appealed to Russian nationalism when it needed support - especially on the Soviet borderlands in the Soviet Union's early years.

Since Russian patriotism served as a legitimizing prop of old order, Bolshevik leaders were anxious to suppress its manifestations and ensure its eventual extinction. They officially discouraged Russian nationalism and remnants of Imperial patriotism, such as the wearing of military awards received before the Civil War. Some of their followers disagreed; in non-Russian territories, Bolshevik power was often regarded as renewed Russian imperialism during 1919 to 1921. In 1922, the Soviet Union was formed with its members combined, but Russia was the largest and most populous member. After 1923, following Lenin's ideas, a policy of korenizatsiya, which provided government support for non-Russian culture and languages within the non-Russian republics, was adopted. However, this policy was not strictly enforced due to domination of Russians in Soviet Union. This domination had been formally criticized in the tsarist empire by Lenin and others as Great Russian chauvinism. Thomas Winderl wrote "The USSR became in a certain sense more a prison-house of nations than the old Empire had ever been. [...] The Russian-dominated center established an inequitable relationship with the ethnic groups it voluntarily helped to construct." Various scholars focused on the nationalist features that already existed during the Leninist period. Korenizatsiya's multinational construction weakened during Stalin's rule. Stalin's policies established a clear shift to Russian nationalism, starting from the idea that Russians were "first among equals" in the Soviet Union, escalating through the "nationalities deportations". According to scholar Jon K. Chang, the Bolsheviks "never made a clean break from Tsarist-era nationalist, populist and primordialist beliefs". Russian historian Andrei Savin stated that Stalin's policy shifted away from internationalism towards National Bolshevism in the 1930s. In a marked change from elimination of the class enemies, the nationality-based repressions declared entire ethnicities counter-revolutionary enemies, although "class dogmas" declaring targeted nationalities to be ideologically opposed to the Soviets were usually added.

Stalin reversed much of his predecessor's previous internationalist policies, signing orders for the exiling multiple distinct ethnic-linguistic groups which were branded as "traitors", including the Balkars, Crimean Tatars, Chechens, Ingush (see Deportation of the Chechens and Ingush), Karachays, Kalmyks, Koreans, and Meskhetian Turks, who were collectively deported to Siberia or Central Asia, where they were legally designated as "special settlers", which officially meant that they were second-class citizens with few rights and they were also confined within a small perimeter. Various historians see Stalin's deportations of minority and diaspora nationalities as evidence of the Russian nationalism of the Soviet state under Stalin. Chang wrote that the Soviet deportations of Koreans (and other diaspora, deported peoples such as Germans, Finns, Greeks and many others) illustrated the fact that in whole, essentialized views of race, that is, primordialism was carried over from the Russian nationalism of the Tsarist era. These Soviet tropes and biases produced and converted the Koreans (and the Chinese) into a decidedly, un-Marxist Soviet "yellow peril". The existence of racism lay in the fact that others could occasionally be seen or judged in accordance with a class line or they could be seen or judged on an individual basis but the Koreans could not. Norman M. Naimark believed that the Stalinist "nationalities deportations" were forms of national-cultural genocide. The deportations at the very least changed the cultures, way of life and world views of the deported peoples as the majority were sent to Soviet Central Asia and Siberia. According to Andrea Kappeler, the application of collective and exemplary punishment to entire ethnic groups, as well as preventive collective measures against them, demonstrated that Stalinism departed from its Marxist premises and moved into a direction of nationalistic thought patters. He also argues that Stalin had recourse to Russian national traditions while selecting many of these groups, because in the Russian national view of history, all of the selected peoples were seen as traitors and sworn enemies. According to historian Jeremy Smith, "As long as Stalin was alive... nationality policy was subject to arbitrary swings. The most disturbing feature of this period was the growth of official Anti-Semitism" including the campaign against "rootless cosmopolitans". Smith observed that "Speeches and newspaper articles raised the spectre of an international Jewish conspiracy to overthrow Soviet power" leading to the purges of the Jewish Anti-Fascist Committee and the Doctors' plot which was associated with the persecution of Jewish Moscow doctors in planned show trials. If Stalin had not died when he did, the alleged Doctors' plot would have led to the deportation of Jews to Siberia. Meanwhile, the defense of the country during World War II had led to the emergence of a new wave of national pride in the non-Russian republics which led to purges in those republics.

According to Evgeny Dobrenko, "Late Stalinism" after World War II was the transformation of Soviet society away from Marxism to demonize the idea of cosmopolitanism. He argued that Soviet actions up to 1945 could still in some way be explained by Leninist internationalism, but that the Soviet Union was turned into a Russian nationalist entity during the postwar years. Through a widespread study of Soviet literature, he found a vast increase in nationalist themes, cultural puritanism, and paranoia in publications during this eight year period making "Stalinism the heart of Sovietness" well after Stalin's death. Historian David Brandenberger contrasts russocentrism characteristic of this era with Russian nationalism. In his view, ethnic pride and promoted sense of Russian national identity didn't cross the threshold of nationalism as "the party hierarchy never endorsed the idea of Russian self-determination or separatism and vigorously suppressed all those who did, consciously drawing a line between the positive phenomenon of national identity formation and the malignancy of full-blown nationalist ambitions." To define the "pragmatic" combination of Russian national identity promotion in Marxist–Leninist propaganda and "symbolically abandoned" earlier proletarian internationalism, Brandenberger describes Stalin's regime with the term "National Bolshevism".

The creation of an international communist state under control of the workers was perceived by some as accomplishment of Russian nationalistic dreams. Poet Pavel Kogan described his feelings of the Soviet patriotism just before World War II:

I am a patriot. I love Russian air and Russian soil.
But we will reach the Ganges River,
and we will die in fights,
to make our Motherland shine
from Japan to England

According to Nikolai Berdyaev:

The Russian people did not achieve their ancient dream of Moscow, the Third Rome. The ecclesiastical schism of the 17th century revealed that the Muscovite tsardom is not the Third Rome... The messianic idea of the Russian people assumed either an apocalyptic form or a revolutionary; and then there occurred an amazing event in the destiny of the Russian people. Instead of the Third Rome in Russia, the Third International was achieved, and many of the features of the Third Rome pass over to the Third International. The Third International is also a holy empire, and it also is founded on an orthodox faith. The Third International is not international, but a Russian national idea.

In 1944, the Soviet Union abandoned its communist anthem The Internationale and adopted a new national anthem conveying a Russian-centered national pride in its first stanza, "An unbreakable union of free republics, Great Russia has sealed forever."

Although Khrushchev rose during Stalinism, his speech On the Cult of Personality and Its Consequences and de-Stalinization signified a retreat from official anti-Semitism and Great Russian Chauvinism. Most, though not all nationalities deported by Stalin were allowed to return during Khrushchev, and the Soviet Union to a degree, resumed a policy of cultivating local national developments. Among the nationalities not allowed to return were Koreans and Crimean Tatars. The Kremlin during Khrushchev, generally favoring Russification overall, would attempt several variations of nationalities policy, favoring korenizatsiya (indigenization) in Central Asia without extending privileges to Russians. In Latvia however, regional communist elites tried to reinstate local korenizatsiya in 1957-1959, but Khrushchev cracked down on these efforts, exiling Eduards Berklavs, and extended privileges to Russians in Latvia. Nonetheless, during Khrushchev's relatively more tolerant administration, Russian nationalism emerged as a slightly oppositional phenomenon within the Soviet elites. Alexander Shelepin, a Communist Party hardliner and KGB chairman, called for a return to Stalinism and policies more in line with Russian cultural nationalism, as did conservative writers like Sergey Vikulov. The Komsomol leadership also hosted several prominent nationalists such as Sergei Pavlovich Pavlov, an ally of Shelepin, while the Molodaya Gvardiya published numerous neo-Stalinist and nationalist works.

=== Since the dissolution of the Soviet Union ===
The first "State flag" of the Russian Empire (1858–1896) is used by modern Russian nationalists and monarchists.

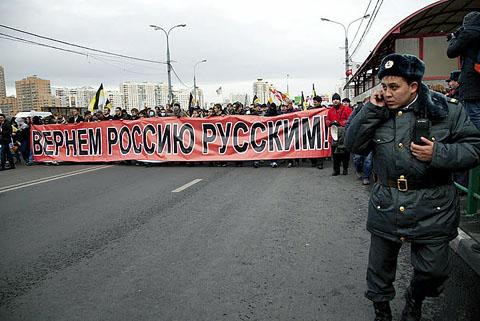
A march of about 7,000 people waving nationalist flags, chanting anti-immigrant slogans and carrying a big banner that reads "Let's return Russia to the Russians" (Вернём Россию русским) in Moscow, 4 November 2011

Many nationalist movements, both radical and moderate, have arisen after the dissolution of the Soviet Union. One of the oldest and most popular is Vladimir Zhirinovsky's right-wing populist Liberal Democratic Party of the Soviet Union and then Liberal Democratic Party of Russia, which had been a member of the State Duma since its creation in 1993. Rodina was a popular left-wing nationalist party under Dmitry Rogozin, which eventually abandoned its nationalist ideology and merged with the larger Russian socialist nationalist party A Just Russia.

One of the more radical, ultranationalist movements was Russian National Unity, a far-right group that organised paramilitary brigades of its younger members before it was banned in 1999. Before its breakup in late 2000 the Russian National Unity was estimated to have had approximately 20,000 to 25,000 members. Others include Battle Organization of Russian Nationalists which was involved in the murder of Stanislav Markelov, the neo-monarchist Pamyat, the Union of Orthodox Banner-Bearers, and the Movement Against Illegal Immigration, which revived the slogan "Russia for Russians." These parties organised an annual rally called the Russian March.

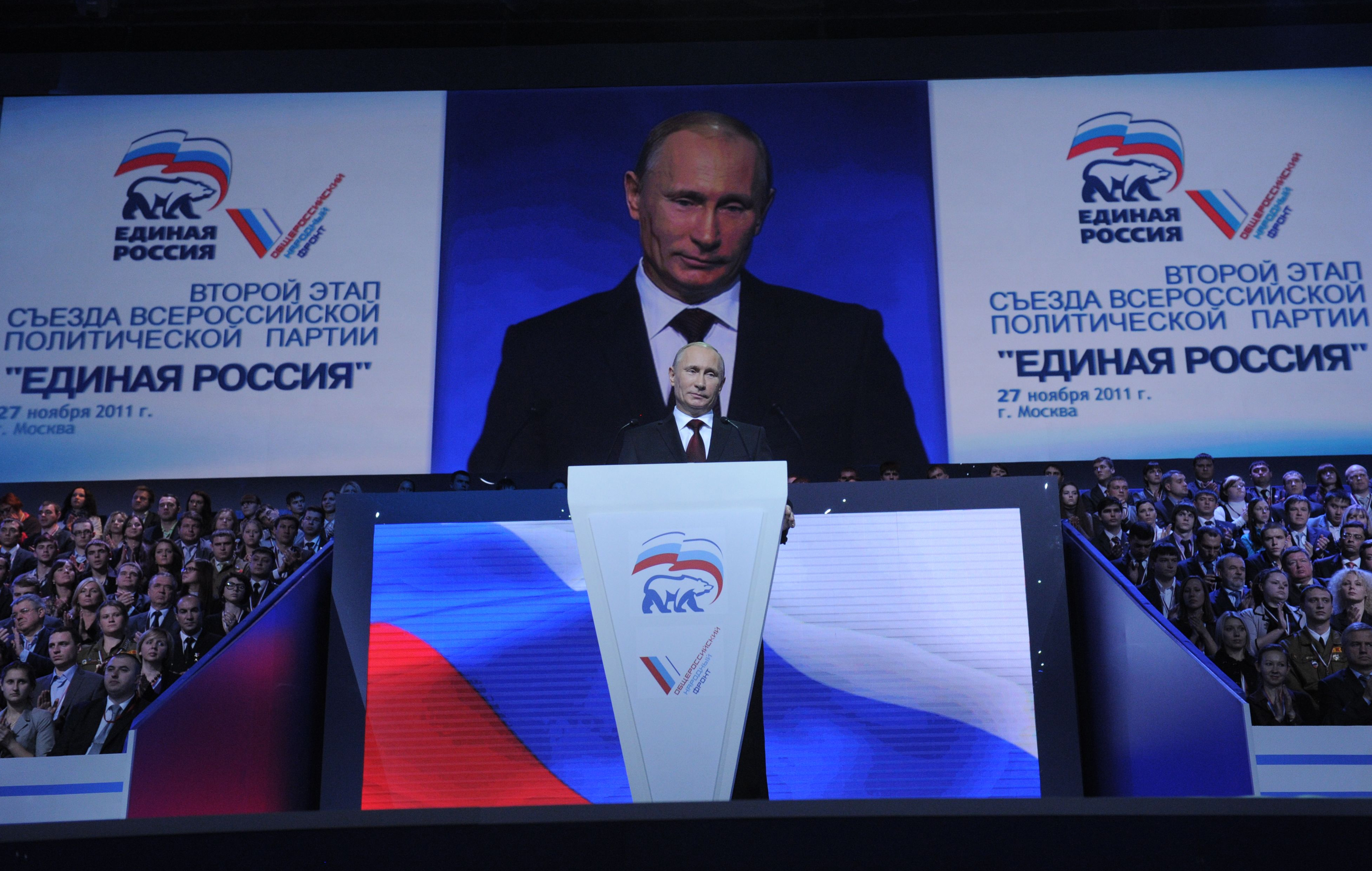
Vladimir Putin at the party congress of United Russia in 2011.

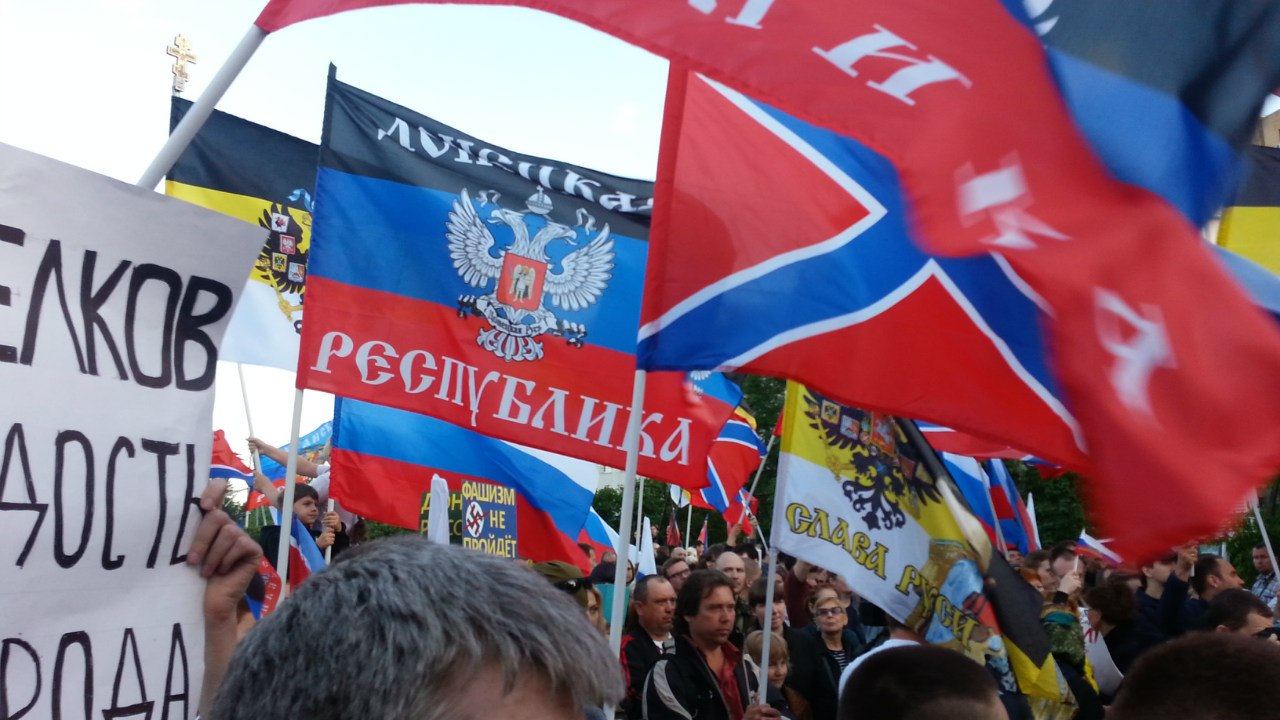
A rally in support of Novorossiya in Moscow on 11 June 2014

The Kremlin conducted a campaign against radical nationalists in the 2010s, and as a result, many of them are currently imprisoned, according to a Russian political scientist and a senior visiting fellow at the George Washington University Institute for European, Russian, and Eurasian Studies Maria Lipman. At the same time, Eurasianism has emerged as the dominant nationalist narrative in Putinist Russia. In a poll conducted by Levada Center in 2021, 64% of Russian citizens identify Russia as a non-European country; while only 29% regarded Russia to be part of Europe.

Sociologist Marcel Van Herpen wrote that United Russia increasingly relied on Russian nationalism for support following the 2014 Russian military intervention in Ukraine. Nationalist political party Rodina cultivated ties with Eurosceptic, far-right and far-left political movements, supporting them financially and inviting them to Eurasian conferences in Crimea and Saint Petersburg.

However, the Kremlin scaled nationalism down out of fears that prominent figures such as Igor Girkin began to act independently, following a brief period of stirring activism that resulted in Russian men volunteering to fight in Donbas in 2014 and 2015, according to Lipman. In Lipman's view, the Kremlin's aim is to prevent emotions that "might get out of control and motivate people to act independently".

Academics Robert Horvath and Anton Shekhovtsov described how the Kremlin uses far-right groups to promote Russian nationalist or anti-western views in Russia and abroad. According to Horvath, the Kremlin cultivated neo-Nazis who reject democratic institutions and imposed restrictions on mainstream nationalists who may support free elections.

In November 2018, Vladimir Putin described himself as "the most effective nationalist", explaining that Russia is a multiethnic and multireligious state and preserving it as such serves the interests of the ethnic Russians. He remarked that Russian ethnicity didn't exist at some point and it was formed by multiple Slavic tribes.

According to Michael Hirsh, a senior correspondent at Foreign Policy:

Graham and other Russia experts said it is a mistake to view Putin merely as an angry former KGB apparatchik upset at the fall of the Soviet Union and NATO’s encroachment after the Cold War, as he is often portrayed by Western commentators. Putin, himself, made this clear in his Feb. 21 speech, when he disavowed the Soviet legacy, inveighing against the mistakes made by former leaders Vladimir Lenin and Joseph Stalin to grant Ukraine even partial autonomy. ... Putin is rather a messianic Russian nationalist and Eurasianist whose constant invocation of history going back to Kievan Rus, however specious, is the best explanation for his view that Ukraine must be part of Russia’s sphere of influence, experts say. In his essay last July, Putin even suggested that the formation of a separate, democratic Ukrainian nation “is comparable in its consequences to the use of weapons of mass destruction against us.”

Putin's views evolved over time. In his speech on 18 June 2004 at the international conference "Eurasian Integration: Trends of Modern Development and Challenges of Globalization", Putin said about the problems hindering integration: "I would say that these problems can be formulated very simply. This is great-power chauvinism, this is nationalism, this is the personal ambitions of those on whom political decisions depend, and, finally, this is just stupidity, ordinary cavemen's stupidity".

Putin's address to the nation on 24 February 2022. Minutes after Putin's announcement, the Russian invasion of Ukraine began.

Since around 2014, the Putin regime has adopted Russian nationalism and great-power chauvinism as its main policy. In July 2021, Putin published an essay titled On the Historical Unity of Russians and Ukrainians, in which he states that Belarusians, Ukrainians and Russians should be in one All-Russian nation as a part of the Russian world and are "one people" whom "forces that have always sought to undermine our unity" wanted to "divide and rule".

In 2020 Russian Constitution went through a significant reform which, among other changes, added a notion of Russians being "state-forming nation" of the Russian Federation, gaining a dominating role over other ethnic groups.

In a speech on 21 February 2022, following the deployment of Russian troops in the Donetsk and Luhansk People's Republics, Putin made a number of claims about Ukrainian and Soviet history, including stating that modern Ukraine was created by the Bolsheviks in 1917 as part of a communist appeasement of nationalism of ethnic minorities in the former Russian Empire, specifically blaming Vladimir Lenin for "detaching Ukraine from Russia". Putin spoke of the "historic, strategic mistakes" that were made when in 1991 the USSR "granted sovereignty" to other Soviet republics on "historically Russian land" and called the entire episode "truly fatal". He described Ukraine as being turned into the "anti-Russia" by the West.

In his speech in November 2023, Putin claimed that the Mongol-Tatar yoke resulting from the Mongol invasion of Kievan Rus' was better for the Russian people than Western domination, saying: “Alexander Nevsky received a jarlyk [permission] from the khans of the Golden Horde to rule as a prince, primarily so that he could effectively resist the invasion of the West." According to Putin, the decision to submit to the Tatar khans preserved "the Russian people - and later all the peoples living on the territory of our country."

==== Ultranationalism ====
Extremist nationalism in Russia is used in reference to many far-right and a few far-left ultra-nationalist movements and organizations. In Russia, the term nationalism is frequently used in reference to extremist nationalism. However, it is frequently conflated with "fascism" in Russia. While the meaning of this terminology does not exactly match the formal definitions of fascism, the common denominator is chauvinism. In all other respects, the positions vary over a wide spectrum. Some movements hold a political position in which they believe that the state must be an instrument of nationalism (such as the National Bolshevik Party, headed by Eduard Limonov), while others (for example, Russian National Unity) promote the use of vigilantist tactics against the perceived "enemies of Russia" without participating in politics.

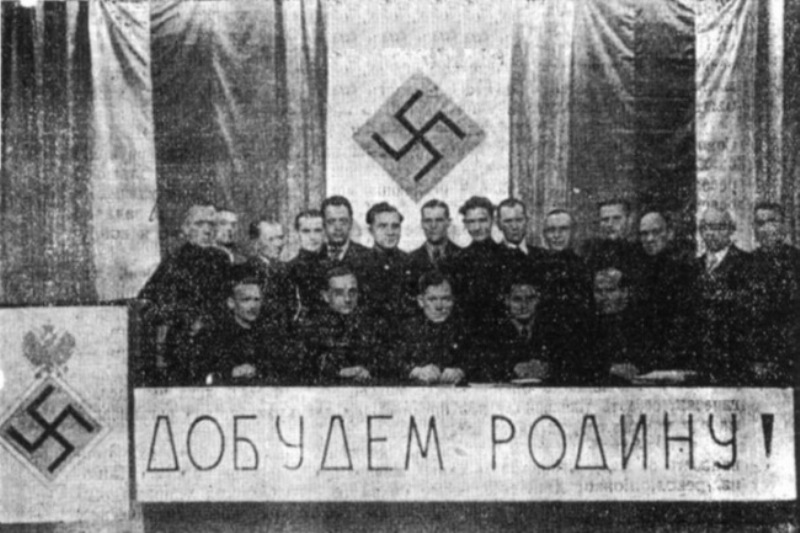
Anti-Soviet Russian Fascist Party, inspired by Italian fascism, in the first half of the 20th century. The slogan "Let's get our homeland!" is also used by the modern far-right in Russia.

In the 1990s and the early 2000s ultranationalist/xenophobic movement was represented by neo-Nazi skinheads, Orthodox–Christian nationalists and national-Imperial forces such as Liberal Democratic Party of Russia headed by Vladimir Zhirinovsky.

In 1997, the Moscow Anti-Fascist Center estimated that 40 (nationalist) extremist groups were operating in Russia. The same source reported 35 extremist newspapers, the largest among these being Zavtra. In spite of repression by governmental authorities, a far-right extremist movement has established itself in Russia.

==== Neopaganism and the Aryan myth ====
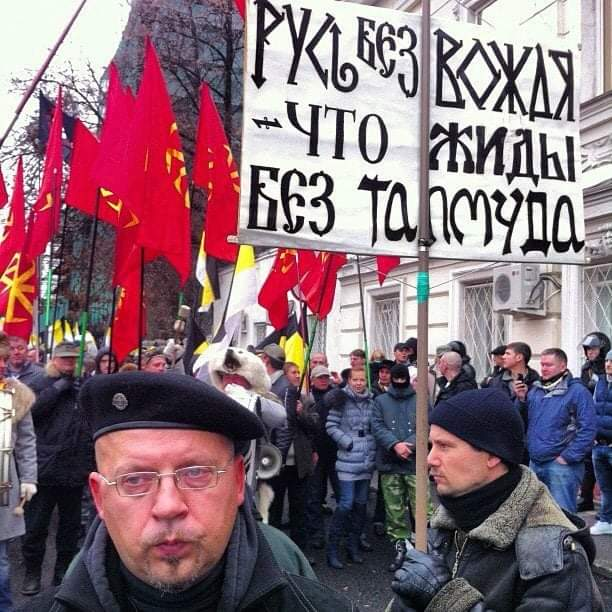
"Russian March 2012" in Moscow. Poster "Russia without a leader is like the Jews (Zhydy) without the Talmud."

Since the fall of the Soviet Union, the Aryan myth has gained publicity in Russia. Numerous series of collections of works by popularizers of the Aryan idea are published (Secrets of the Russian Land, The True History of the Russian People, etc.). They are available in Russian bookstores and municipal and university libraries. These works are not marginal: they have a circulation of tens of thousands of copies (or millions, for example, for books by Alexander Asov), their content is involved in the formation of the worldview basis of a stratum of the population regarding ancient history.

Authors who develop the Aryan theme are often employees of new amateur academies and geopolitical institutions. Only a small number of them have a history degree. Most of them were educated in the field of technology and exact sciences.

The "Aryan" idea in the version of Slavic neo-paganism (the origin of the Slavs from the "Aryans" from Hyperborea or Central Asia, also called the "race of white gods"; the connection of the Slavs with India; ancient pre-Christian Slavic "runic" books; origin from the "Slavic-Aryans" of the ancient civilizations; the neo-pagan symbol "Kolovrat" as an ancient Slavic symbol; a variant of the alien origin of the "Aryan-Hyperboreans") was popularized in the "documentary" programs of the REN TV television network, including broadcasts by Igor Prokopenko and Oleg Shishkin.

In a number of areas of Russian nationalism, the "Aryan" idea is used to justify the right to the territory of modern Russia or the former Soviet Union, which is declared to be the habitat of the ancient "Slavo-Aryans". In a number of post-Soviet countries, "Aryanism" is cultivated by neo-pagan movements that are not satisfied with the real history of their peoples. The pre-Christian past is idealized, allowing one to present one's ancestors as a great victorious people. The choice falls on paganism, since, according to these ideologists, it is endowed with an "Aryan heroic principle" and is not burdened by Christian morality, calling for mercy and ignoring the idea of the priority of "blood and soil".

Christianity is seen by neo-pagans as a hindrance to a successful "racial struggle". The rejection of Christianity and the return to the "ethnic religion", the "faith of the ancestors", according to neo-pagans, will help overcome the split of the nation and return to it the lost moral "Aryan" values that can lead it out of the crisis. Neo-pagans call for a return to the "Aryan worldview" in the name of public health, which is being destroyed by modern civilization. Within this discourse, the slogans of the Conservative Revolution of the 1920s are once again becoming popular. Declaring themselves "Aryans", the radicals seek to fight for the "salvation of the white race", which results in attacks on "migrants" and other representatives of non-titular nationalities.

In many areas of Slavic neo-paganism (rodnovery), Slavs or Russians are credited with historical and cultural or racial superiority over other peoples. This ideology includes Russian messianism, with the Russian people being considered the only force capable of resisting world evil and leading the rest of the world. The "Aryan" idea sets before Russia the task of building an analogue of the "Fourth Reich", a new "Aryan" empire on a global scale. The Russian Aryan myth rejects any territorial disputes, since the Russian people are depicted as absolutely autochthonous throughout Eurasia.

Less common is the model of an ethno-national state associated with the separatism of certain Russian regions. The fragmentation of Russia into several Russian national states, devoid of ethnic minorities, is supposed. In both cases, it is believed that the cohesion of society in the new state should be built on a single "native faith".

Modern Russian neo-paganism took shape in the second half of the 1970s and is associated with the activities of antisemitic supporters of the Moscow Arabist Valery Yemelyanov (neopagan name - Velemir) and the former dissident and neo-Nazi activist Alexey Dobrovolsky (neopagan name - Dobroslav).

== Russian nationalism and ethnic minorities ==
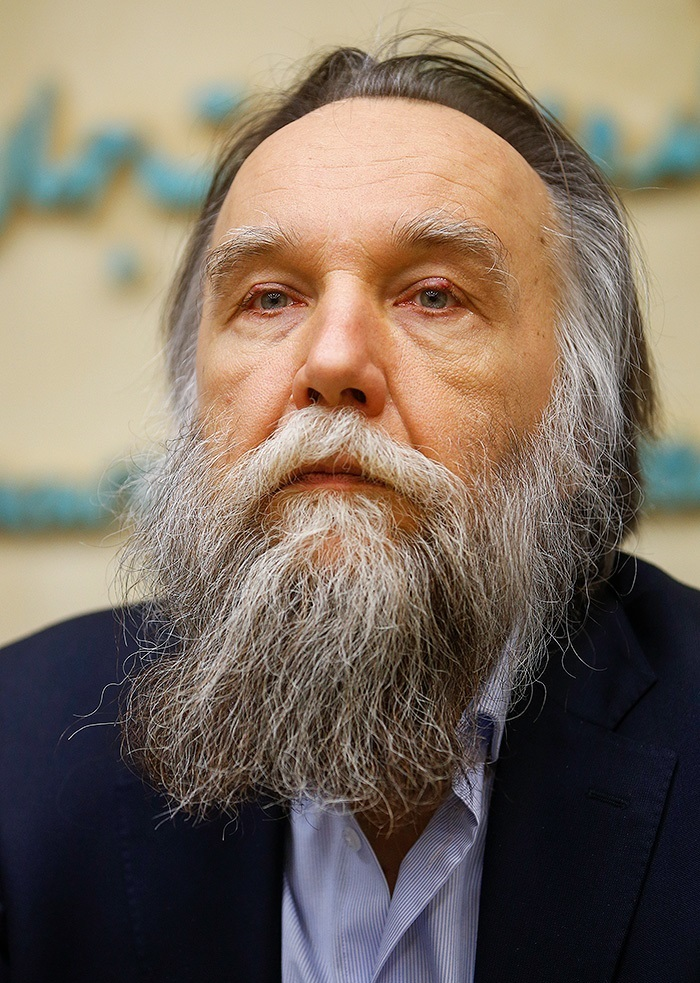
Eurasianist ideologue Aleksandr Dugin is regarded as the most influential Russian nationalist theoretician of the 21st century.

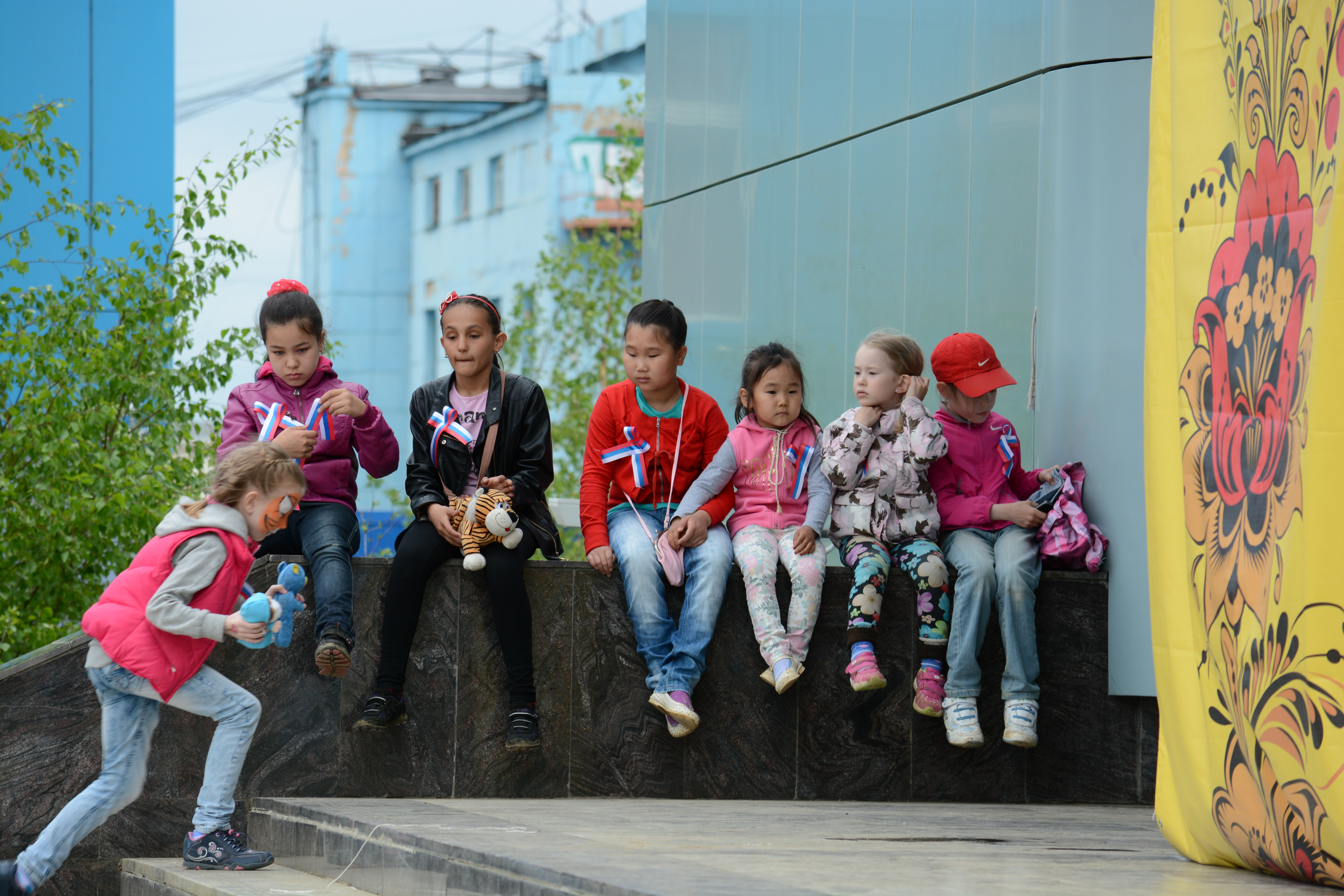
Russia Day celebrations in Mirny, Sakha Republic, 12 June 2014

The issue of Russian nationalism with regard to Russia's relationship with its ethnic minorities has been extensively studied since the rapid expansion of Russia from the 16th century onward. While there is no English word which differentiates the meaning of the word "Russian", in the Russian language, the term is used to refer either to ethnic Russians ("Русские") or to Russian citizens ("Россияне").

The Russian conquest of Muslim Kazan is considered the first event which transformed Russia from a nearly homogenous nation into a multi-ethnic society. Over the years and from the territorial base which it gained in Kazan, Russia managed to conquer Siberia and Manchuria and it also expanded into the Caucasus. At one point, Russia managed to annex a large territory of Eastern Europe, Finland, Central Asia, Mongolia and, on other occasions, it encroached into Turkish, Chinese, Afghan and Iranian territories. Various ethnic minorities have become increasingly viral and integrated into mainstream Russian society, and as a result, they have created a mixing picture of racial relationships in the modern Russian nationalist mindset. The work of understanding different ethnic minorities in relation to the Russian state can be traced back to the work of Philip Johan von Strahlenberg, a Swedish prisoner of war who settled in Tsarist Russia and became a geographer.

The concept is strongly understood by various minorities in Russia. The Volga Tatars and the Bashkirs, the two main Muslim peoples in Russia, have long been lauded as model minorities in Russia, and historically, they have been viewed more positively by the Russian nationalist movement. Furthermore, Tatar and Bashkir imams have worked to spread the Russian nationalist ideology in a way which is in accordance with their Islamic faith.

A map that shows the de jure ethnic republics of the Russian Federation, succeeding the national territories of Soviet Russia since 1990

In the Caucasus, Russia gained a significant amount of support from the Ossetians, one of the few Christian-based peoples which live in the mountainous region. There was also a strong amount of support for Russia among Armenians and Greeks, a sentiment which was largely due to the fact that the Armenians, the Greeks and the Orthodox government of Russia all adhered to similar religions.

The Koryo-saram (Koreans) have also been regarded as a model minority in Russia, and as a result, they have been encouraged to colonize sparsely populated parts of Russia, this policy was first implemented during the Tsarist era and it continues to be implemented today, because Koreans were not hostile to Russian nationalism. Although the Korean diaspora in the Russian Far East was loyal to the Soviet Union and also underwent cultural Russification, Koreans were deported to Central Asia by the Soviet government (1937–1938), based on the erroneous charge that they were aligned with the Japanese. When Khrushchev allowed deported nationalities to return to their homelands, the Koreans remained restricted and they were not rehabilitated. On 26 April 1991 the Supreme Soviet of the Russian Socialist Federal Soviet Republic, under its chairman Boris Yeltsin, passed the law On the Rehabilitation of Repressed Peoples with Article 2 denouncing all mass deportations as "Stalin's policy of defamation and genocide".

Ukrainians in Russia have been largely integrated and the majority of them pledged loyalty over Russia, while some Ukrainians managed to occupy significant positions in Russian history. Bohdan Khmelnytsky is one of Russia's most celebrated figures who brought Ukraine to the Tsardom of Russia throughout the Pereyaslav Council. Ukrainian Prince Alexander Bezborodko was responsible for manifesting the modern diplomacies of Russia under the reign of Catherine the Great. Soviet leaders Nikita Khrushchev, Leonid Brezhnev, Konstantin Chernenko and Mikhail Gorbachev also had some ancestral connections to Ukraine. In addition, Russia's biggest opposition leader, Alexei Navalny, is also of paternally of Ukrainian origin as well as being a potential Russian nationalist.

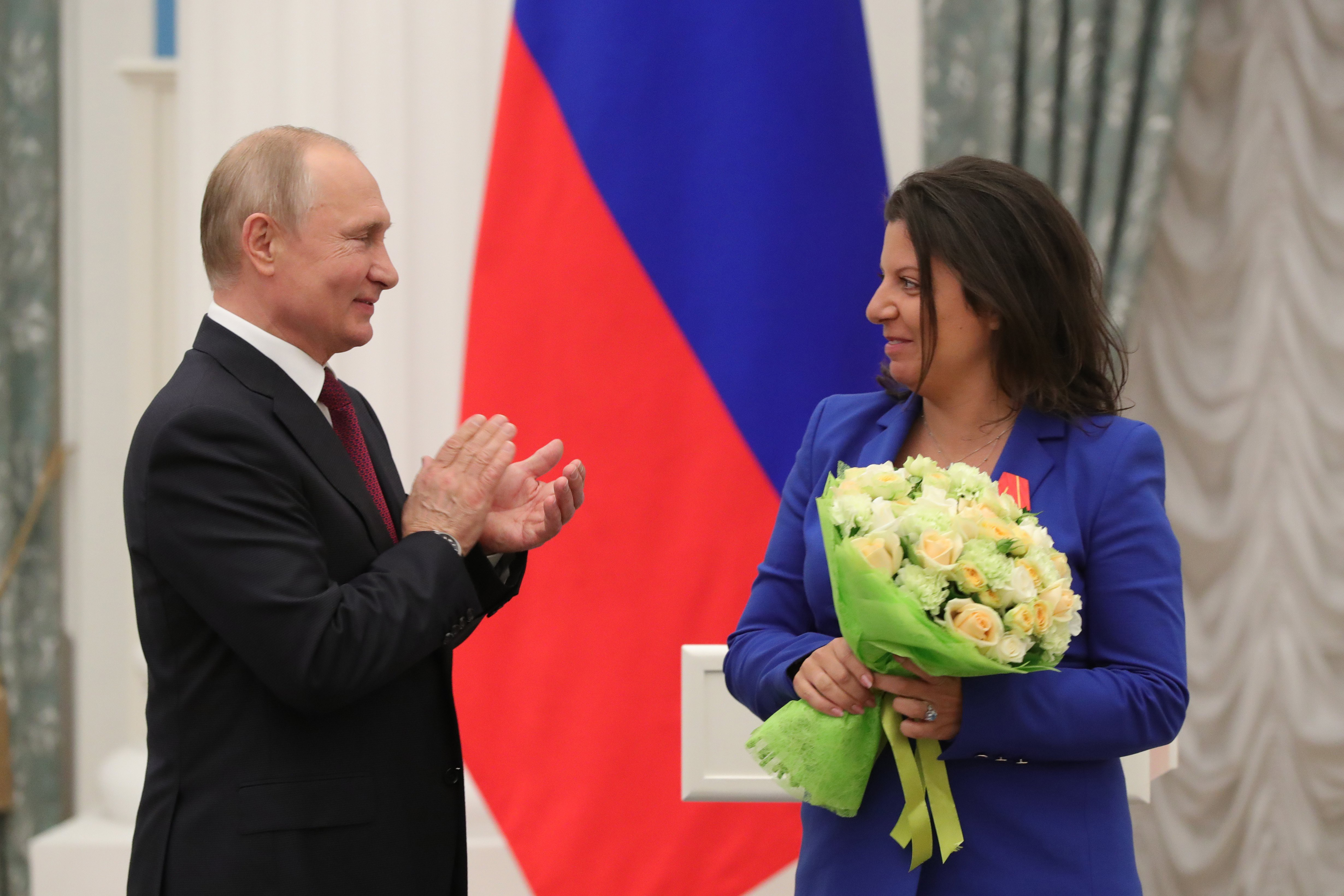
RT editor-in-chief Margarita Simonyan, who is of Armenian descent, spoke out against the 2022 anti-war protests in Russia, stating that "If you are ashamed of being Russian now, don't worry, you are not Russian."

Akhmad Kadyrov and his son Ramzan defected to Russia during the Second Chechen War, pledging loyalty to Putin while maintaining a degree of autonomy for the Chechen Republic, while using this opportunity for securing funds for their regime from Russian federal money. Vladislav Surkov, who is of Chechen origin, was the chief figure who initiated the idea of Russian managed democracy, in which nationalism is a part of the ideology.

Georgians in Russia do not have a positive view of Russian nationalism, and as a result, vast majority of them maintain a neutral or negative opinion. However, Russian expansion into the Caucasus mountains has been driven by Georgian figures such as Pavel Tsitsianov, who initiated the conquest of the Caucasus. Pyotr Bagration was another Georgian who went on to become one of Russia's most celebrated heroes. Soviet Union's transformation into a superpower was the work of yet another Russified Georgian, Joseph Stalin, who had a complex relationship with Russian nationalism.

Some of Dagestan's revered figures have long been respected by Russian nationalists, such as Rasul Gamzatov, who is one of Russia's most respected poets despite his Avar origin. Khabib Nurmagomedov's rise to popularity and fame has earned a divisive opinion among Russians and Dagestanis. Putin loyalist Ramzan Kadirov has made controversial statements attacking the legendary Dagestani leader Imam Shamil, who led the armed resistance of Caucasian Imamate against Russian imperialism during the Murid War. This has resulted in an outpouring of criticism in Dagestanis, who fear that Kadyrovites seek to control the Kizlyarsky and Botlikhsky districts in Dagestan. The comments by Kadyrov are widely seen as part of government attempts to demean religious and national leaders of Russia's Muslim minority who defended their homeland from Imperial Russia.

Germans in Russia have long been treated with privileges under the Tsarist government and many Germans became prominent in Russian politics, education and economy, including the Tsarist House of Romanov, which also included many German-based figures, most notably Catherine the Great. Many Germans fought in the Russian Civil War and regarded themselves as Russian nationalists. The Baltic German nobility were significantly loyal to the Russian Empire, but were resistant to nationalism until the Russian Revolution, identifying mainly as members of the Russian nobility.

A number of critics believe the rise of Russian nationalism is belated. The reason is the passive attitude of Russians towards other peoples inhabiting Russia. Passivity arose because of the huge number of peoples of Russia, which were much smaller in number than Russians. They were easy to dominate and subdue.

== Parties and organizations ==
Political Party	Type	Status	Years of existence
Liberal Democratic Party of Russia	Ultranationalist, Xenophobic	Registered, Part of State Duma	1989–present
Communist Party of the Russian Federation	Left-wing nationalism	Registered, Part of State Duma	1993–present
National Sovereignty Party of Russia	Nationalist	Denied Registration	2000–2012
Great Russia	Nationalist	Denied Registration	2007–present
The Other Russia	Ultranationalist, Irredentist	Denied Registration	2010–present
Pamyat	Ultranationalist, Monarchist	Defunct	1980–1990s
Front of National Revolutionary Action	Neo-Nazi	Defunct	1991-1999
Russian All-People's Union	Nationalist	Defunct	1991–2001
Russian National Union	Neo-Nazi	Defunct	1993–1998
People's National Party	Neo-Nazi	Defunct	1994–2006
Rodina	Nationalist	Defunct	2003–2006
Russian National Socialist Party	Neo-Nazi	Defunct	N/A
Russian National Unity	Neo-Nazi	Banned	1990–2000
Russian All-National Union	Ultra-Nationalist	Banned	1990–2011
National Salvation Front	Left-Wing Nationalism, Right-Wing Nationalism	Banned	1992–1993
National Bolshevik Party	Ultranationalist, Xenophobic	Banned	1994–2007
National Liberation Movement	Nationalist		
Slavic Union	Neo-Nazi	Banned	1999–2010
Movement Against Illegal Immigration	Neo-Nazi	Banned	2002–2011
National Socialist Society	Neo-Nazi	Banned	2004–2010
Northern Brotherhood	Neo-Nazi	Banned	2006–2012
Russians	Nationalist, Xenophobic	Banned	2011–2015
National Bolshevik Front	Nationalist		2006–present
Derzhava (Russian party)	Nationalist	Banned	
Eurasia Party	Nationalist	Banned	
Labour Russia	Left-Wing Nationalism	Banned	
National Republican Party of Russia	Nationalist	Banned	1991 - 1998
Patriots of Russia	Nationalist	Banned	
People's Union (Russia)	Nationalist	Banned	
Russian Community	Ultranationalist, Xenophobic		2020–present
Northern Man	Ultranationalist, Xenophobic		2020–present

- Black Hundreds early 20th century (Defunct)
- Mladorossi (Defunct)
- Union of the Russian People (Defunct)
- Russian Fascist Party (Defunct)
- Movement Against Illegal Immigration

== See also ==
- All-Russian nation – Imperial and modern Russian irredentist ideology
- Moscow, third Rome – Theological and political concept
- Nerus (ethnic slur) – Russian political slur
- Eurasianism – Socio-political movement in the Russian Federation
- Putinism – Political system in Russia under Vladimir Putin
- Russian Fascist Organization – Fascist organizations in Manchuria by Russian émigrés
- Russian Fascist Party
- Russia for Russians – Anti-multicultural sentiment
- Russian imperialism
- Russian irredentism
- Russian world – Conceptual sphere of influence of Russia
- Russification – Measures to increase the influence of Russian culture and language
- Russophilia – Admiration and fondness of Russia
- Soviet patriotism – Patriotism theory developed by Vladimir Lenin
- White movement – Major faction in the Russian Civil War
- Z (military symbol) – Russian military and propaganda symbol

== Bibliography ==
English

- Afzal, Amina. Resurgence of Russian Nationalism. Strategic Studies 27, no. 4 (2007): 53–65.
- Aitamurto, Kaarina. Paganism, Traditionalism, Nationalism: Narratives of Russian Rodnoverie. London : Routledge, 2016.
- Blanc, Eric. Revolutionary Social Democracy: Working-Class Politics Across the Russian Empire. Haymarket Books, 2022.
- Bojanowska, Edyta M. Nikolai Gogol: Between Ukrainian and Russian Nationalism. Cambridge: Harvard University Press, 2007.
- Bojcun, Marko. The Workers Movement and the National Question in Ukraine 1897-1918. Leiden : Brill, 2021.
- Brudny, Yitzhak M. Reinventing Russia: Russian Nationalism and the Soviet State, 1953–1991. Cambridge: Harvard University Press, 1999
- Cosgrove, S. (2004). Russian Nationalism and the Politics of Soviet Literature: The Case of Nash Sovremennik, 1981–1991. New York: Palgrave Macmillan.
- Druzhnikov, Yuri. Prisoner of Russia: Alexander Pushkin and the Political Uses of Nationalism. New Brunswick: Routledge, 1999.
- Duncan, Peter J. S. (March 2005). "Contemporary Russian Identity between East and West". The Historical Journal. 48(1): 277–294.
- Dunlop, J. B., The Faces of Contemporary Russian Nationalism. Princeton: Princeton University Press, 1983.
- Dunlop, J. B., The New Russian Nationalism, Praeger, 1985* Ely, Christopher, Jonathan Smele, and Michael Melancon. Russian Populism: A History. New York: Bloomsbury Academic, 2022.
- Frolova-Walker, Marina. Russian Music and Nationalism: From Glinka to Stalin. New Haven: Yale University Press, 2008.
- Helmers, Rutger. Not Russian Enough?: Nationalism and Cosmopolitanism in Nineteenth-Century Russian Opera. Rochester: University of Rochester Press, 2014.
- Hillis, Faith. Children of Rus’: Right-Bank Ukraine and the Invention of a Russian Nation. Ithaca: Cornell University Press, 2013.
- Horvath, Robert. Putin’s Fascists: Russkii Obraz and the Politics of Managed Nationalism in Russia. New York: Routledge, 2020.
- Kolstø, Pål, and Helge Blakkisrud, eds. The New Russian Nationalism: Imperialism, Ethnicity and Authoritarianism 2000–2015. Edinburgh University Press, 2016.
- Laqueur, Walter. Russian Nationalism. Foreign Affairs 71, no. 5 (1992): 103–16.
- Laruelle, Marlène. Russian Eurasianism: An Ideology of Empire. Washington, D.C.: Baltimore: Johns Hopkins University Press, 2008.
- Laruelle, Marlene. Russian Nationalism: Imaginaries, Doctrines, and Political Battlefields. London: Routledge, 2018.
- Motyl, Alexander J. (2001). Encyclopedia of Nationalism, Volume II. Academic Press. ISBN 0-12-227230-7.
- Pipes, Richard. The Formation of the Soviet Union: Communism and Nationalism, 1917-1923. Cambridge: Harvard University Press, 1964.
- Plokhy, Serhii. Lost Kingdom: The Quest for Empire and the Making of the Russian Nation. New York: Basic Books, 2017.
- Riasanovsky, Nicholas V. Nicholas I and Official Nationality in Russia 1825–1855. Berkeley: University of California Press, 1959.
- Sablin, Ivan. The Rise and Fall of Russia’s Far Eastern Republic, 1905–1922: Nationalisms, Imperialisms, and Regionalisms in and after the Russian Empire. London: Routledge, 2018.
- Shenfield, Stephen D. Russian Fascism: Traditions, Tendencies, Movements. London: Routledge, 2000.
- Simon, Gerhard. Nationalism and Policy Toward the Nationalities in the Soviet Union: From Totalitarian Dictatorship to Post-Stalinist Society. Translated by Karen Forster and Oswald Forster. London: Routledge, 2019.
- Sinyavsky, Andrey, and Dale E. Peterson. Russian Nationalism. The Massachusetts Review 31, no. 4 (1990): 475–94.
- Strickland, John. The Making of Holy Russia: The Orthodox Church and Russian Nationalism Before the Revolution. Jordanville: The Printshop of St Job of Pochaev, 2013.
- Tuminez, Astrid S. Russian Nationalism since 1856: Ideology and the Making of Foreign Policy Lanham: Rowman & Littlefield Publishers, 2000.
- Verkhovsky, Alexander (December 2000). "Ultra-nationalists in Russia at the onset of Putin's rule". Nationalities Papers. 28(4): 707–722.
- Wegren, Stephen K. Putin’s Russia. Eighth edition. Lanham: Rowman & Littlefield Publishers, 2022.
- Wegren, Stephen K. Putin’s Russia: Past Imperfect, Future Uncertain. Seventh edition. Lanham: Rowman & Littlefield Publishers, 2018.
- Kappeler, Andreas (2013). The Russian Empire: A Multi-ethnic History. Routledge. pp. 380–381. ISBN 9780582234154.

Russian

- Russian: А. Л. Янов. Патриотизм и национализм в России. 1825–1921. М., Академкнига, 2002
- Russian: Г. Кожевникова Радикальный национализм в России: проявления и противодействие Центр экстремальной журналистики.
