= Mikhail Astafyev =

Former Russian politician (born 1946)

Mikhail Georgiyevich Astafyev (Russian: Михаил Георгиевич Астафьев; born September 16, 1946) is a physicist and a former Russian politician. Born in Moscow, he was the Peoples' Deputy of the Russian Federation from 1990 to 1993.
