= Sergei Korotkikh =

Far-right Ukrainian mercenary and activist

- Сергей Коротких
- Born: Sergei Arkadievich Korotkikh; 12 July 1974 (age 52); Tolyatti, Kuybyshev Oblast, Russian SFSR, Soviet Union
- Other names: Malyuta; Zakhar Lavrentyev; Botsman; Boatswain; Shorty
- Citizenship: Russia; Belarus; Ukraine (since 2014)
- Occupations: Mercenary; political activist; soldier; FSB agent (alleged); KGB RB agent (alleged)
- Political party: Russian National Unity (1999-2001); National Socialist Society (2004-2006); National Corps (2017-present)
- Other political affiliations: Format18, BPF Party, Skins' Legion
- Movement: Occupy Pedophilia, Belarusian opposition (early)
- Military service
- Allegiance: Union State of Russia and Belarus, Ukraine (since 2014)
- Branch: Armed Forces of Belarus (1992-1994), Ukrainian volunteer battalions (2014-present)
- Conflicts: Yugoslav Wars (unconfirmed), Chechen–Russian conflict (unconfirmed), Russo-Ukrainian War

Sergei Arkadievich Korotkikh (Russian: Сергей Аркадьевич Коротких), also known as Botsman and Malyuta, is a Russian-born Belarusian-Ukrainian far-right mercenary, former neo-Nazi political activist, and suspected special agent for one or more post-Soviet state intelligence agencies.

A highly experienced combat veteran, Korotkikh has long been known for his association with several neo-Nazi and similar ultranationalist organizations in Eastern Europe through the end of the 1990s and the decade of the 2000s, many of which groups have been tied to racially motivated attacks and killings.

Korotkikh is alleged to have been involved in a number of murders as well as kidnappings, war crimes, and robberies in addition to smuggling and racketeering. In August 2021, the Investigative Committee of the Russian Federation charged Korotkikh with a series of murders motivated by national hatred and arrested him in absentia. Despite this, he has never been brought to trial or received legal sentencing for any of crimes he is accused of.

== Biography ==
=== Early life and political beginnings ===
Sergei Korotkikh was born on 12 July 1974 in Tolyatti of the Russian Soviet Federative Socialist Republic but would end up spending his childhood years in the Republic of Belarus. In 1992, Korotkikh was drafted into the Armed Forces of Belarus and was assigned to a reconnaissance battalion. After finishing up his military service in 1994, Korotkikh went on to attend the Institute of National Security, a KGB academy located in Minsk. Korotkikh was expelled from the school in 1996, which he said was a result of clashes with the police at the Chernobyl Way march organized by the Belarusian Popular Front (BPF) opposition party. On the contrary, many BPF participants in the rally question the full extent of Korotkikh's involvement in the protest and claim it was a staged false flag set up by Belarusian law enforcement. Moreover, BPF activists have questioned whether or not Korotkikh was truly present at the 1996 Chernobyl Way protest as he claims.

Sergei got his start within the Eastern European neo-Nazi movement during the 1990s as a member of the Skins' Legion, a white power skinhead clique affiliated with the Russian National Unity led by Aleksandr Barkashev. This organization stood as one of the most prominent ultranationalist movements within the Union State of Russia and Belarus throughout the mid-1990s - reportedly having up to thousands of followers. In 1999, Sergei Korotkikh helped set up a Belarusian chapter of the Russian National Unity (VOPD RNU) in which he would serve a hierarchal role. According to Korotkikh himself, the VOPD RNU raised money by operating protection rackets at local marketplaces, providing security for church-related buildings/events, and smuggling cars. Human rights advocates have reported that the group took part in attacks on Jews, people of the Caucasus, and Romanis.

During his tenure as an RNU member, a particular instance arose where Sergei Korotkikh engaged in a fight with activists Andrei Sannikov, Dzmitry Bandarenka and Aleh Byabenin. In interviews with the Kyiv Post, several right-wing Belarusian opposional activists went on to attest that the Russian National Unity had been compromised by the State Security Committee of Belarus (KGB RB) alongside Russia's Federal Security Service (FSB). Korokikh would ultimately end up parting ways with the organization in 2001.

=== The NSO and Format18 ===
Sergei Korotkikh relocated from Belarus to Russia in the early 2000s. When the year 2004 rolled around, he proceeded to co-found a neo-Nazi organization with the assistance of a few other Russian neo-fascist politicians which became known as the National Socialist Society (NSO). Two notable founders of the organization were Dmitry Rumyantsev and Maxim Gritsai. Rumyantsev had previously been a member of the Slavic Union but abandoned the group due to ideological and strategic disagreements with the group's leadership. Gritsai, on the other hand, funded the National Socialist Society and its activities. Some believe that Gritsai acted as an intermediary between the NSO and the secret service.

The ideology of the National Socialist Society has commonly been described as Hitlerist, pan-Slavic, white supremacist, antisemitic, and xenophobic. The group sought to overthrow the existing Russian government and create a totalitarian White ethnostate in its place which would be based upon the doctrine of National Socialism and the Nazi Party. Despite having an openly radical anti-government rhetoric, the National Socialist Society attempted to present itself as a legitimate political party - possessing a strict hierarchy but with somewhat individual autonomy to each of its subordinate regional factions. To promote the National Socialist ideology, the NSO organized pickets and rallies, distributed propaganda materials, and conducted online propaganda through its official website. Aside from political activities, the group also trained its members in paramilitary combat techniques and guerrilla warfare tactics in preparation for terroristic acts and a supposedly impending "race war". At the height of its popularity, the National Socialist Society had factions in at least thirteen different Russian cities which included Moscow, Ryazan, Voronezh, Saint Petersburg, and Nizhny Novgorod. According to the Russian newspaper Izvestia, the NSO became one of the nation's the most influential and wealthy neo-Nazi organizations. The group was no stranger to physical brutality, however. During the six-year span of its existence, countless affiliates of the National Socialist Society perpetrated a series of violent hate crimes which included assault and murder. In 2008, a total of 42 victims were killed by National Socialist Society militants belonging to a Moscow-based cell known as NSO-North (Russian: НСО-Север).

Utilizing his combative expertise, Sergei Korotkikh routinely drilled members of the National Socialist Society on wartime fighting techniques whilst overseeing the group's financial operations on the side. A particularly distinct aspect of the NSO was that its members were paid a rather generous salary on account of opulent financial backing from convicted Russian fraudster Maxim Gritsai. This strategy, in turn, made the NSO far more attractive compared to its other far-right paramilitary counterparts. In 2006, notorious neo-Nazi icon Maxim Martsinkevich and a handful of his like-minded Nazi skinhead followers joined up with the National Socialist Society. Sergei Korotkikh and Maxim Martsinkevich would end up becoming close friends and would often collaborative on various extremist activities. The latter has repeatedly referred to Korotkikh as his "senior comrade" and mentor. On the side of the NSO, Sergei Korotkikh was also a moderator on Martsinkevich's Format18 (F18) web forum where racist media promoting white supremacist beliefs would be hosted.

=== Shamil Odamanov case ===
In August 2007, a snuff video was uploaded to the web in which masked neo-Nazi militants brutally execute two physically restrained Iranic individuals. It starts off with the beheading of a young Dagestani with a Tajik male subsequently shot in the head at close range. Entitled the Execution of a Tajik and a Dagestani, this graphic three-minute film was posted in racist skinhead internet circles before rapidly spreading throughout various shock sites where it eventually achieved viral status and international attention. Russia's Ministry of Internal Affairs had dismissed the authenticity of the snuff footage until one of the murder victims in the filmed recording became successfully identified as Shamil Odamanov.

Following an eventual investigation into the homicides, Russian authorities concluded that the xenophobic execution had been preliminarily arranged by Martsinkevich. Svetlana Petrenko, an official representative spokeswoman for the Investigative Committee of Russia, claims that while Martsinkevich was imprisoned for an unrelated crime in 2020, he ended up confessing to the authorities that he had been the cameraman who filmed the notorious execution video in 2007 and revealed that the accomplice who had managed carry out both murders was Korotkikh. By this account, Martsinkevich then purportedly went on to name the final masked militant neo-Nazi appearing in the footage as Maxim "Dentist" Makienko. On 16 September 2020, Martsinkevich was found dead in his prison cell. His death was officially ruled as a suicide but occurred under mysterious circumstances.

In conjunction with Martsinkevich's testimony, another confession video surfaced on the web during 2021, in which Sergei Korotkikh testifies on the record against prominent members of the National Socialist Society including Maxim Martsinkevich, Alexander "Shultz" Filyushkin (Shitov), Alexey "Ideolog" Akimov and Andrey "Ded" Chuenkov (Dedov). On the recording, he discloses his intention to fully cooperate with the authorities. Although the Korotkikh's taped confession came to light in 2021, it was said to have actually been recorded sometime back in 2007. Incidentally, this was a year after Sergei Korotkikh had been kicked out of the NSO and had formed his own unofficial offshoot.

On 24 August 2021, the Investigative Committee of Russia charged Korotkikh with murder for killing two or more people based on ethnic, religious or political hatred, which was described by the Kyiv Post as likely being for his suspected role in the murders.

=== Further activities in Russia and Belarus ===
Korotkikh was a suspect in organizing the explosion of a public street lamp on Manezhnaya Square, Moscow, carried out by NSO militants during December 2007.

Sergei Korotkikh became a participant in the anti-LGBT Occupy Pedophilia movement that was started in the early 2010s by Maxim "Tesak" Martsinkevich in which participants would film videos of themselves attacking and humiliating homosexuals - often by pouring urine over victims, shaving their heads and/or forcing them to perform fellatios on rubber sex toys.

Korotkikh would end up being expelled from the National Socialist Society sometime between 2006 and 2007. While the official NSO statement maintained that his expulsion was due to theft and "financial mismanagement", it was also known to have been influenced by a previous incident where he and Tesak uploaded a pornographic video to the internet which depicted them having sex with a female member of the National Socialist Movement "Slavic Union" who went by the nickname "Taina-SS" (Russian: «Тайна-СС»). This video was released in order to antagonize Slavic Union leader Dmitry Demushkin who had been an opponent of the NSO ever since his departure from the Russian National Unity in 1999. After being kicked out of the NSO, Korotkikh attempted to establish his own unofficial offshoot, although it was unsuccessful. There were also attempts by him and his allies to discredit the original National Socialist Society through postings on Format18, a multimedia web-based project run by Tesak. Sergei Korotkikh returned to Belarus in early 2008. Not long after, his former group gradually began to fall apart and would eventually fold entirely in 2010.

In February 2013, Korotkikh, Martsinkevich, and a third nationalist were detained by the Belarusian authorities after taking part in a brawl in Minsk, Belarus, against anti-fascists believed to be fans of FC Partizan Minsk. Korotkikh was preliminarily reported to have wounded one of said anti-fascists with a knife. The victim described the attacker as a local supporter of Maxim "Tesak" Martsinkevich. According to the police, the criminal case was closed because supposedly none of the victims had managed to file a complaint against their assailants.

By his own account, Korotkikh claimed to save up money from 2010 to 2013 by working for an American private military company in Latin America. He also worked briefly in the Middle East around this time - where he would oversee the protection and escort of humanitarian convoys.

By early 2014, Sergei Korotkikh resided in Havana, Cuba along with Maxim "Tesak" Martsinkevich. Martsinkevich had entered the country via Belarus in an attempt to avoid legal prosecution by the Russian authorities on account of videos he had uploaded to the internet that featured racialist and extremist content. Despite his efforts, Cuba's National Revolutionary Police Force (PNR) apprehended Martsinkevich on January 27 due to migration law violations. The PNR subsequently deported him back to Russia where he was indicted a few days afterwards.

=== Fighting in the Russo-Ukrainian War ===
Following the outbreak of the War in Donbas (a phase of the larger Russo-Ukrainian war), Sergei Korotkikh relocated to Ukraine in 2014 and fought against the Russian proxy forces as a member of the Azov Battalion. He began his tenure with the volunteer unit as a combat instructor before later commanding a reconnaissance company.

For his war efforts, he was controversially granted Ukrainian citizenship the same year by the country's then-President Petro Poroshenko despite Korotkikh not renouncing his Belarusian citizenship. In 2017, Korotkikh graduated to the Azov Battalion's political wing, the National Corps.

External image
- Sergei Korotkikh with Ukrainian President Petro Poroshenko

In spring of 2022, Sergei Korotkikh shared videos with Meduza showing the corpses of slaughtered Ukrainian civilians within occupied Bucha alongside Russian military equipment to provide evidence of Russian war crimes in what was known as the Bucha massacre.

== Other possible political killings ==
Korotkikh has been suspected of having a connection to several murders.

=== Gleb Samoilov (2000) ===
In 2000, Gleb Samoilov, the leader of the Russian National Unity's Belarusian branch, was found stabbed to death in his Minsk apartment. Sergei became a prime suspect in the murder investigation but the case would end up being dropped in the long run on account that he and his fellow RNU members refused to co-operate with law enforcement. The motive behind Gleb Samoilov's demise is thought to have stemmed from a dispute with the group's second-in-command, Valery Ignatovich - who Samoilov had reportedly attempted to expel from the organization after Ignatovich had publicly spoke in a lengthy news interview.

=== Aleh Byabenin (2010) ===
On 3 September 2010, Belarusian dissident journalist Aleh Byabenin was found fatally hung at his summer cottage located within the outskirts of Minsk. While the Belarusian authorities conclude that Byabenin committed suicide, his death occurred under very suspicious circumstances.

=== Pavel Sheremet (2016) ===
Korokikh was suspected to have a connection to the killing of journalist Pavel Sheremet. Korotkikh denied having anything to do with the murder, insisting that the two were friends.

=== Vitaly Shishov (2021) ===
Belarusian exile Vitaly Shishov was found dead in Ukraine in August 2021. He was known for heading the Belarusian House in Ukraine (BDU), a non-profit NGO that provides assistance to Belarusian defectors residing in Ukraine. Shishov is thought to have been killed by a state-sponsored Belarusian (or even Russian) death squad - which is where Sergei Korotkikh's potential involvement comes into the picture. According to Radio Svoboda Belarus, the BDU is tied to Sergei Korotkikh.

Three weeks before his death, Vitaly Shishov informed his close friend Yury Lebedev that he suspected Russo-Belarusian officials had successfully infiltrated the Belarusian House in Ukraine. Around the time of his death, it is also believed that Vitaly Shishov was under surveillance and received threats. The Special Rapid Response Unit of the Internal Troops of Belarus is special police unit with a long history of carrying out questionable enforced disappearances of individuals deemed a threat to the regime of Alexander Lukashenko.

=== Yaroslav Babych (2021) ===
Yaroslav Babych, the deputy head of legal counsel for the Azov Battalion was found hanged in his Kyiv apartment on the morning of August 3, 2021. Although his death is labelled as a suicide, it occurred under suspicious circumstances and with preceding events that involved Sergei Korotkikh. The wife of Babych believed that it was Korotkikh who killed her husband.

== Allegations of working for Union State intelligence agencies ==
Beginning as far back as the 1990s, there has been prominent evidence-backed speculation by a number of journalists, politicians and affiliates of various political movements that Sergei Korotkikh was employed as an intelligence officer by the Russian/Belarusian intelligence service - possibly using the pseudonym Zakhar Lavrentyev at some point. Such allegations serve as the explanation for why he has consistently managed to evade facing legal penalty from any of the numerous criminal charges brought against him - unlike most of his co-conspirators. As such accusations go, Korotkikh began working for the Union State intelligence community in the 1990s as member of the State Security Committee of the Republic of Belarus (Belarusian KGB/KGB RB). It is then put forward that Sergei was never actually expelled from the Institute of National Security (informally known as the KGB school) in 1996 as he had claimed, but instead completed training and was thereafter assigned by the Belarusian KGB to go undercover within the nation's nationalist movement in order to gather any information that could assist the government with countering civilian opposition to the Lukashenko regime.

Multiple Belarusian oppositional media sources in particular have specifically accused Korotkikh of working for the Union State intelligence services. In interviews with the Kyiv Post, several Belarusian ultranationalists have expressed their criticism for the Russian National Unity, maintaining that it had been infiltrated with spies from the Belarusian KGB and Russian FSB.

Further theoretical claims uphold that Korotkikh was already employed the Federal Security Service of the Russian Federation (FSB) upon his relocation to the Russian Federation in the early 2000s. His settling in the country is said to have been prompted by a special assignment he received from the FSB which tasked him with infiltrating the Russian neo-Nazi scene. One noteworthy detail is that the brother of NSO-founder Maxim Gritsai is an officer of the Russian Federal Security Service.

In 2015, Israeli filmmaker Vlady Antonevicz released a documentary titled Credit for Murder, which investigates the murder of Shamil Odamanov. Antonevicz argued that the FSB and the Russian authorities had clandestinely assisted with the country's surge of racially motivated attacks and murders committed by racist skinhead gangs which began in the late 1990s and continued into the decade of the 2000s. The purpose of this would have been to use the increase of attacks or murders to create fear amongst the public as an excuse for the Russian government to justify its request for increased funding and resources, and thus, power. This tactic of fear also was said to have been used to help rally public support for candidate Dmitry Medvedev in the 2008 Russian presidential election. Incumbent Russian President Vladimir Putin, a known supporter of Medvedev, was said to have spearheaded these clandestine false flag operations for said purpose. What also helps provide strength to such a claim is the fact that a substantial portion of the hate crimes to have occurred in Russia throughout this period went unsolved without an adequate investigation or, in some cases, any investigation.

In Credit for Murder, Antonevicz visits Russia several times over six-year period where he interviews the Odamanov family along with Dmitry Demushkin and Dmitry Rumyantsev with the intention of gathering sufficient information to expose those involved in the 2007 murder case. After putting together his findings at the end of the documentary, Antonevicz comes to the conclusion that Korotkikh had carried out the murders on behalf of the Russian government.

Presumptuous theories have also spread within post-Soviet far-right circles - even by those formerly affiliated with Korotkikh. Aleksandr Belov, head of the xenophobic Movement Against Illegal Immigration group, professed that the Odamanov murders were likely carried out with assistance from the FSB. Slavic Union leader Dmitry Demushkin claims that the manner of such an execution does match the typical killing style of neo-Nazi extremists - implying that the act was performed by a more professional entity.

External image
- Sergei Korotkikh (left), with Ekaterina Zigunova and Denis Loginov. Denis Loginov is an officer within the Centre for Combating Extremism. The photograph was taken right before Korotkikh had moved to Ukraine in 2014.

At present, the status of Korotkikh's purported relationship with the Union State of Russia and Belarus is unknown. Being that he has been residing in Ukraine since the start of the Russo-Ukrainian War and actively fights against Russia and its allied proxy forces, it is possible that he abandoned any past loyalty to Russo-Belarusian state intelligence agencies and that this was prompted by the events surrounding Ukraine's Revolution of Dignity. Another possibility is that he remains affiliated with the governments of Russian/Belarus and is posing as some sort of double agent.

== Personal life ==
According to Sergei, he has been a fan of books and films about espionage since his childhood and says it was what prompted him to attend KGB school in 1994 after serving in the Belarusian Armed Forces.

Sergei Korotkikh maintains a close friendship with Oleksandr Avakov, the son of the former Interior Minister of Ukraine Arsen Avakov. It was reported that Arsen Avakov appointed Korotkikh to lead the Ministry's Department for the Protection of Strategic Objects in 2015. However, Avakov said that Korotkikh never worked in the Ministry of Internal Affairs.

In a 2022 interview with Al Jazeera, Korotkikh said that his past beliefs have changed, describing himself as a "right-wing European conservative" and expressing praise for modern-day Poland, Hungary and Japan, referring to these nations as "healthy societies".

Sergei is an associate of Valery Ignatovich, the former head of the Special Purpose Police Detachment of the Belarusian Interior Ministry who received a life sentence on 16 July 2002 for the kidnapping and disappearance of Belarusian cameraman Dmitry Zavadsky. Some sources have stated that Sergei Korotkikh and Valery Ignatovich are cousins while others have said they are nonfamilial friends although either is yet to be confirmed.

== See also ==
- Belarusian and Russian partisan movement (2022–present)
- Dmitry Utkin, a former Russian intelligence officer and mercenary with connections to neo-Nazism
- Donetsk People's Republic §§ Ideology and Far-right
- Extremist nationalism in Russia
- Neo-Nazism in Russia
  - Combat Terrorist Organization
  - Ethnic National Union, the successor to the National Socialist Society
  - Nikolay Korolyov (nationalist)
  - Russian Fascist Party
- Russian separatist forces in Ukraine § Far-right
  - Atomwaffen Division
  - Rusich Group
  - Russian Imperial Movement
  - Russian Orthodox Army
  - Serbian Action
