= Maxim Martsinkevich =

Russian neo-Nazi activist (1984–2020)

- Максим Марцинкевич
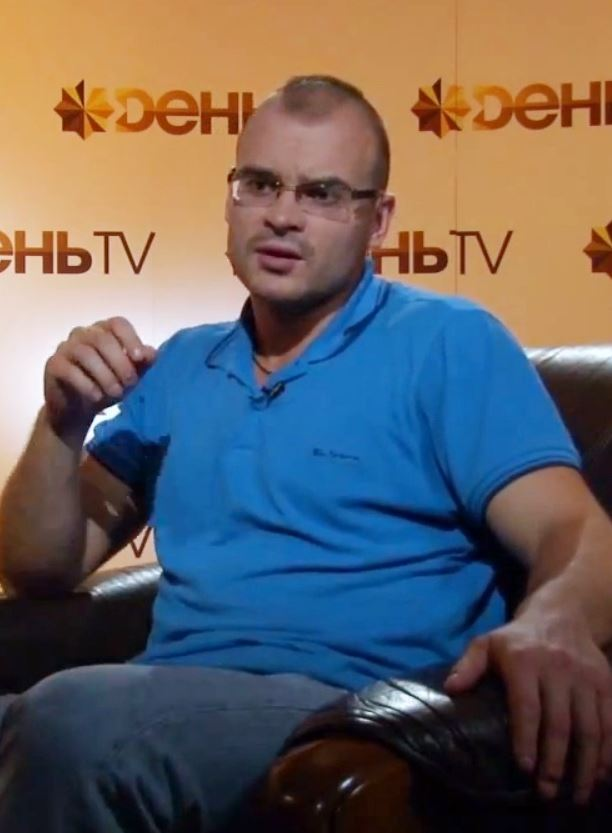
- Maxim Martsinkevich talks on Den TV. Russia, Moscow. September 27, 2012.
- Born: 8 May 1984; Moscow, Russian SFSR, Soviet Union
- Died: 16 September 2020 (aged 36); Chelyabinsk, Russia
- Other name: Tesak
- Citizenship: Russia
- Education: Russian State Social University (Unfinished)
- Known for: Leading Russian neo-Nazi and anti-gay organizations
- Criminal charges: Incitement of racial or ethnic hatred; robbery, property destruction and hooliganism
- Criminal penalty: Multiple terms, including 10 years in a strict regimen labor colony
- Criminal status: Deceased

Maxim Sergeyevich Martsinkevich (Russian: Макси́м Серге́евич Марцинке́вич, 8 May 1984 – 16 September 2020), better known as Tesak (Russian for Cleaver, Hatchet, Hand Axe, Machete), was a Russian neo-Nazi activist, media personality, vlogger, and the leader and co-founder of the Restruct movement which manifested in post-Soviet countries.

Tesak first gained public attention as a white power skinhead and the leader of the far-right youth group Format 18, which has been described as the "armed wing" of the National Socialist Society. There are numerous branches within Martsinkevich's Restruct movement, the most prominent of which is Occupy Pedophilia, with Tesak having stated that its goals are the promotion of national socialism, identifying the nature of liberal views, and drawing the public's attention to the issue. Tesak's racism, violent approach and targeting of ethnic minorities and gay males have been criticized. On one occasion his actions led to the imprisonment of a highly ranked official within the Russian judicial system.

Martsinkevich received three prison sentences for inciting racial or ethnic hatred. Tesak was first indicted in 2007, after disrupting political debates by performing the Nazi salute and yelling "Sieg Heil!" at a book club in Moscow. In 2009, he was sentenced to three years for making a video with racist content. Martsinkevich's memories from this time in prison are expressed through his book Restruct. Following his release from prison, Tesak was unemployed, posted vlogs, and made a living by charging others for joining his "hunts for pedophiles" and for attending his lectures on life in prison, ways of shoplifting, as well as other subjects. In the autumn of 2013, Tesak was indicted again for releasing new videos featuring racist remarks. As a result, on 15 August 2014, he was sentenced to five years in prison. On 11 November 2014, the court reduced the sentence to two years and 10 months.

On 27 June 2017, the Babushkinsky district court of Moscow sentenced Martsinkevich to ten years in a strict regimen corrective labor colony for his involvement in attacks targeting synthetic cannabinoids dealers. During his fourth prison term, in 2020, an investigation was started about his involvement in hate killings. Martsinkevich confessed to murders and cooperated with investigating authorities, but was later found dead in his prison cell.

== Early life and education ==
Maxim Martsinkevich was born in 1984 in Moscow to Sergey Yevgenyevich Martsinkevich and Viktoriya Leonidovna Martsinkevich. During his lifetime he indicated he was of Russian, Polish, Lithuanian, and Belarusian ancestry. As expressed in his first autobiographical audio book Destruct, his mother did not share her son's extremist views while his father was supportive.

Martsinkevich was conscripted into the Russian Army, although he claimed that he was released after a few days, following a mental health evaluation caused by him having beaten up a fellow soldier of Azerbaijani ancestry. Tesak's nickname was related to his interest in knives. He graduated from a secondary vocational school for architecture and was expelled from the Russian State Social University.

== Career ==
Martsinkevich said he had been employed as an engineer for three and a half years. He sold his videos and tried to sell music through his website. Later on he used to sell his book, Restruct, in the same way. He also sold ads in his videos and tried to organize a financial pyramid scheme called Tesak Money.

Tesak was a member of the white power skinhead group "Russian Purpose" led by Semyon Tokmakov. Until 2003, Martsinkevich was also in the People's National Party.

=== Format 18 ===
In 2005, at age 21, he created the skinhead organization "Format 18". The number 18 is a code or euphemism for "Adolf Hitler", as the letter A is the first in the Latin alphabet and H is the eighth. Members of Format 18 attacked Asian migrant workers and homeless people, filmed the attacks, and uploaded the videos to the Internet. Martsinkevich made fictional videos promoting hatred towards black people and antifascists. The Russian Reporter magazine published a story about one of the videos, in which "Martsinkevich shocks the public with his video of the execution of a [...] Tajik drug dealer [...] hanged and dismembered by people dressed as members of the Ku-Klux-Klan [...] soon revealed as having been staged, with the flesh of the dismembered captive having turned out to be beef". One of the publicly available Format 18 videos called "Dacha History X" depicts a skinhead dressed as an old woman who hates black people, with her grandson burying them in the garden. A similar event takes place in the movie Russia 88. Among other similarities, the main character of the film is nicknamed Shtyk (Bayonet), and like Tesak, he takes a camera and films Russians asking their opinion on immigrants from the Caucasus and Asia.

The organization maintained a website which was banned in 2007 after a complaint from one of the writers for an antifascist website. A number of followers of Format 18 have also uploaded their own videos of humiliations and physical violence. The most recognized video of that kind has been described as the "execution of a Tajik and a Dagestanian", released in August 2007, at a time when Martsinkevich was already incarcerated. The Investigative Committee of Russia made a statement indicating that the executions shown in the videos have been verified as real.

In September 2010, a Russian court order banned Format 18 for extremism.

=== First conviction, 2007 ===
On 28 January 2007, Martsinkevich and his friends visited the Bilingua book club in Moscow. At the time, it was used as a platform for the political debates involving journalists Yulia Latynina and Maxim Kononenko. Tesak asked if they agreed that in order for Russia to improve, every democrat needed to be killed, then shouted "Sieg!" and put his hand up in the Nazi salute, followed by his friends yelling "Heil!". The shouting continued for a few more minutes, with a number of the female attendees yelling "fascism will not pass!" in response. Kononenko suggested that they call the police, as performing Nazi salutes in public places was prohibited in Russia. The police were not called. Eventually, the host of the debates Alexei Navalny submitted a letter to the Russian public prosecutors' office.

On 2 July 2007, about 10 members of a Russian anti-extremist special forces unit arrested Martsinkevich at a gym he had used for training. On 18 February 2008, Tesak was sentenced to three years in prison for inciting ethnic or racial hatred (article 282 in Russia). The Russian newspaper Novaya Gazeta published an opinion piece stating that investigators ignored the worst cases of this neo-Nazi's criminal activity, thus leading to the mild punishment.

=== Second conviction, 2009 ===
In 2006, 20 people dressed as members of the Ku Klux Klan staged the execution of a Tajik drug dealer, filming and releasing it on the Internet. The organizers of the performance were Martsinkevich and Artyom Zuev. Zuev also provided the voice-over for the video.

On 16 January 2009, Tesak was charged for these acts with inciting ethnic hatred and received a sentence of three years in prison. The court gave Martsinkevich credit for good conduct and adjusted the sentence to three and a half years in prison starting from the first conviction. Artyom Zuev received a suspended sentence of three years.

Martsinkevich was released on 31 December 2010. Following his release from prison, Tesak was unemployed, posted vlogs, and made a living by charging others for joining his "hunts for pedophiles" and for attending his lectures on life in prison, ways of shoplifting, as well as other subjects. Half a year later he attempted to join the Russian Opposition Coordination Council and was registered as a candidate for the elections but was subsequently disqualified for his neo-Nazi views and lack of opposition to the Russian government, with the latter partly related to his application fee having been paid by a member of the pro-government youth movement Nashi.

=== Occupy Pedophilia, 2011 ===
After getting out of prison Martsinkevich started the Occupy Pedophilia (Russian: Оккупай-педофиляй, romanized: Okkupay-pedofilyay) movement focused on beating up and humiliating males regarded as pedophiles. Members of the movement found victims through the Internet, posed as male minors, and went on a date. Then a group of people met the alleged pedophile and humiliated him, sometimes pouring urine over his head, while filming it for release online.

In September 2013, the media began to report on one of Tesak's videos recorded in an apartment in Moscow, resulting in the arrest of Andrey Kaminov, ex-deputy chief of the Federal Bailiff Service for Moscow Oblast.

Activists of the movement and Tesak in particular were criticized by the media for vigilantism, violence, and connections to another branch of Martsinkevich's Restruct movement called Occupy Gerontophilia (Russian: Оккупай-геронтофиляй), which targeted young males allegedly interested in dates with older same-sex partners. Actions of members of both of the branches have also been described as campaigns against LGBT people, with one Occupy Pedophilia local group leader saying that "practically all gay men [are] pedophiles".

=== Third conviction, 2013 ===
A new criminal charge against Tesak was filed in the autumn of 2013. Fleeing from prosecution, Martsinkevich traveled to Cuba through Belarus, planning to make new videos. In December 2013, a court in Moscow convicted him In absentia for extremism in the publication of three YouTube videos featuring Tesak. Two of the videos were his reviews of the Russian movies Stalingrad and Okolofutbola (Kicking Off), with racist remarks, while the third video criticized all the candidates of the Moscow mayoral elections and suggested removing immigrants as a means of improving the city. Videos related to the "Occupy pedophilia" movement have also been investigated. Martsinkevich said that the indictment was ordered by the "pedo lobby" seeking revenge, mentioning the official Andrey Kaminov he caught during a date with a minor organized by Maxim.

On 17 January 2014 Tesak was arrested in Cuba. On 27 January 2014, he was handcuffed and deported from Havana to Moscow for overstaying, then arrested by Russian authorities. On 29 January 2014 Martsinkevich was indicted in person.

A Moscow court began hearing the case on 30 July 2014. Martsinkevich was charged with inciting ethnic hatred with the threat of violence (part 2 of the article 282 of the criminal code in Russia). The prosecution argued that the defendant has shown three videos with extremist content and psychological threats made by Martsinkevich on his personal page on the social network Vkontakte. The court agreed and, on 15 August 2014, sentenced Martsinkevich to five years in a penal colony with a strict regimen. On 11 November 2014, the prisoner's lawyers appealed the decision and the court reduced the sentence to two years and ten months.

=== Fourth conviction, 2017 ===
On 18 March 2015, it was reported that Martsinkevich had been charged with robbery and hooliganism. His lawyer said that the charges were related to Tesak's activities against smoking blends dealers. The case was heard at the Babushkinsky District Court in November 2016, with Marsinkevich pleading not guilty. The prosecutor asked for 11 years and 6 months of confinement in a strict regimen corrective labor colony. Tesak was found guilty of the attacks - one having resulted in death, and on 27 June 2017, judge Alexander Glukhov sentenced Martsinkevich to 10 years in a strict regimen labor colony, beginning on 27 January 2014. One other attacker received 10 years, while the others have received 3 to 5.

On 21 May 2018, it was reported that the Moscow City Court overturned the 27 June 2017 conviction and requested another hearing, while leaving Martsinkevich incarcerated. In December 2018, the Babushkinsky District Court again sentenced Martsinkevich to 10 years in a strict regimen labor colony. Martsinkevich filed an appeal. He was serving the sentence in Matrosskaya Tishina.

=== Other legal issues ===
In February 2013, Tesak was in Minsk, Belarus to get a laser vision correction. During the visit, he entered into a fight with a group of anti-fascist football fans of FC Partizan. His associate Sergey Korotkikh stabbed one of them with a knife, which resulted in Martsinkevich getting arrested by the police on the suspicion of hooliganism. He was soon released with no charges pressed.

One of Martsinkevich's lawyers made a public statement in October 2014, saying that his client had been charged with hooliganism for cutting off a man's hair.

In November 2014, Tesak was charged with inciting ethnic hatred for writing and publishing his book Restruct, which has been classified as extremist.

=== Allegations of murders ===
The investigation of the above-mentioned murder of a Tajik and a Dagestanian gradually led to Maxim Martsinkevich, who was at that time (2020) serving his fourth prison sentence. Partners in crime pointed at him, he was interrogated and most likely tortured. He confessed of participating in a series of murders motivated by racist ideology. According to the investigation, the victims were several men of non-Slavic appearance (mostly Central Asian migrant workers) and a Russian prostitute. Martsinkevich testified against other participants of the murders and led the investigators to some of the victims' bodies. Eventually, despite all the confessions made by Martsinkevich and others, the investigation against him was closed in the beginning of 2023 at his father's request, due to the death of the suspect.

== Personal life and death ==
In a September 2012 interview, Martsinkevich said he was not married and he did not have children.

On 16 September 2020, Martsinkevich was found dead with signs of torture in a pre-trial detention centre in the Chelyabinsk region, reportedly from taking his own life. Investigators launched a preliminary inquiry into his death, in light of the security cameras near his cell having been inoperative on the night of his death. He had been due to travel to Moscow for questioning regarding a criminal case originating from 1999. He was aged 36. Martsinkevich’s funeral at Kuntsevo Cemetery in Moscow was attended by an estimated 2,000–4,500 people.

His attorney Matvey Dzen contested the official explanation of his death as a suicide. According to a report in Meduza, a suicide note was discovered after Martsinkevich was found dead in his prison cell. The note was reported to have contained a request for officials to give a private diary and a book on communism to Martsinkevich's wife in Yekaterinburg.
