= Murder of Shamil Odamanov =

2007 filmed beheading in Russia

- Location: Losiny Ostrov National Park, Moscow, Russia
- Date: 20 April 2007; 19 years ago
- Attack type: Double-murder by beheading and shooting
- Victims: Shamil Odamanov; Unidentified Tajik man
- Perpetrators: Format18 and National Socialist Society
- Motive: Neo-Nazism, White Supremacy, Opposition to immigration
- Accused: Maxim Martsinkevich; Sergei Korotkikh; Maxim Bazylev
- Convictions: Murder against two or more people
- Sentence: Aristarkhov: 16 years in prison Marshakov: 17 years in prison
- Convicted: Maxim Aristarkhov; Sergei Marshakov

On 20 April 2007, Shamil Umakhanovich Odamanov (Note: Also spelled Udamanov in some Caucasian sources) and another unidentified man were murdered by members of a Russian neo-Nazi group. On 12 August 2007, a video depicting their deaths called Execution of a Tajik and a Dagestani (Russian: Казнь таджика и дагестанца, romanized: Kazn' tadzhika i dagestantsa) was posted on the social media site LiveJournal. The beheading video became viral, gaining the nickname The Russian neo-Nazi beheading video. The incident was considered a cold case until 2020, when the Russian government announced that one of the accused (Maxim Martsinkevich) confessed his involvement soon before his death.

== Background ==
=== Perpetrators ===
The attack was planned by Maxim "Tesak" Martsinkevich, leader of the neo-Nazi group Format18. According to Martsinkevich, among his accomplices were Sergei "Malyuta" Korotkikh and Maxim Bazylev, the former being a co-founder of the National Socialist Society (NSO); his statements, however, have not been confirmed and neither of them have been convicted.

In 2006, Martsinkevich filmed a video depicting the staged execution of a Tajik drug dealer with the assistance of journalists, allegedly on the behalf of a Russian branch of the Ku Klux Klan. He would later cite such a video as the inspiration for the murders, stating: "The year before, we filmed a staged video about the Ku Klux Klan, and they didn't believe us. Then Bazylev and I decided that we needed to shoot a real video."

=== Victim ===
Shamil was born c. 1982-1983 in the village of Sultan-Yangi-Yurt in Kizilyurtovsky District, Dagestan. He was 24 at the time of his death. He moved to Moscow in 2006 to find a job "and possibly a bride", working at MTS and occasionally finding freelance work on the M8. He regularly contacted his parents, often complaining about harassment from white power skinheads. According to his father Umakhan, he last talked with him in late March.

== Murder ==
The murder took place on 20 April 2007, the same date as Adolf Hitler's birthday. Shamil and the unidentified man were lured to the murder site under the pretense of acting in a staged video for a news report. Long believed to have taken place near Obninsk in Kaluga Oblast, it was later proven that it actually took place in Losiny Ostrov National Park in Moscow.

A camera was set up at the scene in order to film the murders. Both victims were asked to say "We were arrested by Russian national socialists" before they were killed. Shamil was beheaded with a serrated knife while the other man was shot in the head. They were both buried in pre-dug graves.

Both victims shortly before being murdered (Odamanov on the right)

=== Execution of a Tajik and a Dagestani ===
On 12 August 2007, a video called Execution of a Tajik and a Dagestani was posted on the LiveJournal blog of the user vik23, which included footage of the murders. Many of the video's elements were added post-production, including background music by the band Arkona and graffiti featuring a swastika. Audio of a man saying "Glory to Russia!" was overlaid before both murders, taken from a Slavic Union rally.

A few hours later, the video was also posted on the news website of Russian neo-Nazi group National Socialist / White Power (NS/WP) and on the LiveJournal blog of the user antigipsyone. On 13 August, the video was included in the top thirty most popular web searches of Russian search engine Yandex.

On 15 August, a student of the Maykop State Technological University, Viktor Milkov, who, by his own admission, was "a supporter of Nazi ideas", came to the Prosecutor's Office of Adygea and admitted to posting the video, claiming he received the video and posted it at the request of an unknown individual he met online, who introduced herself only as a "girl from Germany."

== Reactions ==
=== Russian far-right groups ===
Aleksandr Belov, leader of the Movement Against Illegal Immigration, claimed that the murders might have been done with the assistance of members of the Federal Security Service (FSB). Dmitry Demushkin, leader of the Slavic Union, echoed similar sentiments, saying "This is not the level of a group of 3–5 people from the Kaluga Oblast..."

== Investigation ==
=== First NSPR statement ===
On 14 August, soon after the video's release, a statement was sent by the National Socialist Party of Rus' (NSPR), a hitherto unknown neo-Nazi group, to Kavkaz Center claiming responsibility for the murders. Calling themselves an "independent militant wing" of the NSO, they demanded the transfer of political power to the group's leader, Dmitry Rumyantsev, the release of all "Russian national socialists convicted in recent years", and the eviction of all non-Slavs from the country.

On 15 August, the press office of the NSO published a press release, denying that the NSPR was a subdivision of their group, but acknowledging that "autonomous national socialist groups" could have been involved. Rumyantsev repeated similar claims in response to a Gazeta.Ru inquiry.

=== Hoax claims ===
On 16 August, an anonymous source within the Ministry of Internal Affairs claimed that "experts have doubts about the authenticity of the recording" and that the video might have been staged. On 21 August, Oleg Elnikov, head of the Internal Affairs' press center, said that the preliminary results of the video examination showed "obvious signs of editing." This ambiguous statement was interpreted by some media outlets as confirmation of the video being a hoax.

=== Identification of Shamil Odamanov ===
Shamil's family first learned about the video in January 2008. Recognizing his clothing (which Artur, one of Shamil's brothers, personally gifted to him before he moved), they sent a letter to government officials in Moscow. They didn't get a response until April, when "a conversation was held" with them by local officials and Artur was summoned to Moscow to testify. Shamil was confirmed to be one of the victims in June 2008.

=== Second NSPR statement ===
In the same month, a manifesto from the NSPR was published, written by someone under the pseudonym "Commander Branislav". Two hitherto unreleased photos from the murder scene were attached alongside it, in order to prove its legitimacy.

One of the photos attached to the NSPR's second statement

The manifesto claimed that the August 2007 statement was not written by them and consisted of "outright disinformation about recognizing some kind of political leadership above oneself." It also encouraged people to form autonomous combat groups, consisting of 1 to 5 people, so as to effectively wage guerrilla warfare, and claimed the group would attack security forces soon. No attack would be carried out.

=== "Credit For Murder" documentary ===
In 2015, former Israeli soldier Vladi Antonevicz released a documentary called Credit for Murder, accusing members of Format18 and the NSO. He named Martsinkevich, Korotkikh, and Rumyantsev as suspects; more specifically, he claimed that Korotkikh was the one who beheaded Shamil, while Martsinkevich had filmed the footage.

According to Antonevicz, at the end of his investigation, he wrote a letter to Vladimir Putin, asking him to pay more attention to the murder, after which he was invited to testify in Moscow. In an interview with Meduza, he stated how he believed the video's publication was connected with a wave of ethnic killings that swept Russia six months later on the eve of the 2008 presidential elections. In the same interview, he also stated how he thought Korotkikh to be an agent provocateur who worked for the FSB.

=== Martsinkevich's confession ===
In September 2020, Martsinkevich, who was serving a sentence for another case, was found dead in the cell of the remand prison No. 3 in Chelyabinsk. Svetlana Petrenko, a spokesman for the Investigative Committee, announced that he had confessed to the two murders of "persons of non-Slavic nationality" in 2007 soon before his death. A video reportedly containing part of his confession would later be leaked to Telegram.

On 14 January 2021, Vladi Antonevicz published a letter that Martsinkevich allegedly addressed to his closest accomplices, Andrey "Grandfather" Chuenkov and Alexander "Schultz" Filyushkin, in which he warned that he had confessed to "basically everything" and suggested they leave the country at once:

"I also took part in the execution of a Tajik and a Dag. Marshakov gave testimony against me, so they brought me to Kras. There was no way to prove that it wasn't me. I said that Malyuta cut the head, and Dentist is the one who makes the Nazi salute in the video. And Romeo agreed. I'm sure he has already confirmed it. Everyone needs to flee the country! You tell Artyom and have him inform the others."

Artem "Artyom" Kostylev was soon found dead, having hanged himself in a forest near Krasnogorsk.

== Charges ==
On 24 August 2021, the Investigative Committee of the Russian Federation brought two charges of homicide on Sergei Korotkikh. Korotkikh moved to Ukraine in 2014 and thus has not been brought to trial. He is currently a member of the Azov Brigade, a Ukrainian volunteer militia with associations with far-right groups.

On 27 July 2022, Maxim "Romeo" Aristarkhov and Sergei Marshakov were sentenced to 16 and 17 years in prison respectively for their involvement in the murders by a Mytishchi court. Both were already incarcerated; Aristarkhov for the murder of a taxi driver and Marshakov for shooting at FSB officials. They were both sent to a maximum security corrective labor colony.
