= Aleksandr Ivanov-Sukharevsky =

Soviet film director (born 1950)

Aleksandr Kuzmich Ivanov-Sukharevsky (Russian: Александр Кузьмич Иванов-Сухаревский; born 26 July 1950) is a far-right politician in Russia. He was the leader of the People's National Party (NNP).

== Early life ==
Ivanov-Sukharevsky was born in Rostov-on-Don, Russian SFSR, the son of a Red Army officer from the Byelorussian Soviet Socialist Republic and a pharmacist from the Ukrainian Soviet Socialist Republic whose family background came from a leading clan of Don Cossacks, with one of her ancestors lending his name to the Sukharev Tower. He spent much of his childhood in East Germany, where his father was serving, before returning to Rostov, where in 1967 he entered a local military college.

However he lost interest in a military career, enrolling in Rostov State University in 1970 to study economics. This also failed to excite his interest and in 1974 he entered the All-Union State Institute of Cinematography, qualifying as a film director in 1979.

== Film director ==
Ivanov-Sukharevsky first came to notice in the Soviet Union as director of the film's: Korabl (1988), a drama starring Vladimir Zamansky, Tayna zemli (1985), a film starring Yelena Safonova, Nikolai Prokopovich, Vladimir Simonov. Some of his work was however suppressed by the Soviet vetting commission, notably a 1987 documentary Ship, which Ivanov-Sukharevsky claimed was banned by a "gang of Yids" under the direction of Alla Gerber because it dealt with anti-Semitic themes.

== Politics ==
Ivanov-Sukharevsky was admitted as a captain in the right-wing militia group the Moscow Cossack Guards in 1992 although he claims to have had no involvement with any political parties until establishing his own in 1994. This is disputed by Stephen Shenfield however, who states that Ivanov-Sukharevsky was a member of such groups as Russian National Unity, the Russian National Assembly and the All-Russian National Right-Wing Centre. Around this time he also read Adolf Hitler's Mein Kampf and Benito Mussolini's The Doctrine of Fascism and was heavily influenced by both works, especially the latter. However, despite sharing much of the ideology Ivanov-Sukharevsky would not accept the label of fascism, considering the term to be too non-Russian in nature.

He established the NNP in 1994, and has sought to make the party into a leading voice of white nationalism in Russia. He has built up a reputation as a leader of the racist skinhead movement in the country. A supporter of like-minded groups across Europe, Ivanov-Sukharevsky has called for a closer European unity with Russia at the head of an eventual European super-state. His decision to enter politics was not without controversy and in 1995 he was subjected to a series of physical attacks and burglaries of his home by unknown assailants. Although the culprits were never identified Ivanov-Sukharevsky pointed the finger at rival right-extremist leader Alexander Barkashov. Barkashov's Russian National Unity movement had consistently rejected offers to co-operate with the NNP, largely because Barkashov viewed Ivanov-Sukharevsky as an unnecessary rival for the leadership of the ultra-nationalists.

Ivanov-Sukharevsky has been jailed on more than one occasion, notably in February 1999 when he was remanded for inciting hatred. During this period he shared a cell with Semyon Tokmakov, the leader of the Russian skinhead gang Russian Goal, and he began to recruit the skinheads to his cause. The two published a joint letter from Butyrka prison in the PNP paper Ya-Russky, and as a result the paper became a popular seller among racist skinheads. He was found guilty in April 2002, although he was almost immediately released under an amnesty.

Ivanov-Sukharevsky was largely supportive of Vladimir Putin when he was first elected as President of Russia, describing him as an 'indispensable and extremely important politician' and the 'hyper-link between Marxism and Russism', although adding that 'his ideology reflects the past stage of history'. Although he had not specifically supported Putin's candidature in the election, he had not declared support for any candidate for the Presidency.

== Ideology ==
Sukharevsky follows an ideology that he calls Russism (or Ruscism), which emphasises the centrality of race above all divisions. Russism is attractive to racists and ethnic nationalists who adhere to Paganism rather than the Russian Orthodox Church, which is generally afforded a central role on the Russian extreme right. Russism seeks to build a link from pre-revolutionary orthodox monarchism to Nazism, and identifies the two great heroes of the Twentieth century as Nicholas II of Russia and Adolf Hitler, arguing that Hitler was revenge on the Bolsheviks for the revolution.

According to his personal ideology the Russy consists of eight branches i.e. the "Great Russians", the Belarusians, the Ukrainians (the three groups from which he has descent), the Ruthenians of Carpathia, the "New Russians", the Siberians, the Cossacks and the Pomors.
