= Ethnic National Union =

Neo-Nazi organization active in Russia, Ukraine and Belarus

Ethnic National Union Этническое национальное объединение Етнічне національне об'єднання Этнічнае нацыянальнае аб'яднаньне
- Abbreviation: ENU (English); ENO
- Leader: Collective leadership A. Revelin (formally)
- Founded: 20 December 2018
- Preceded by: National Socialist Society; Azov Regiment; Other far-right organizations
- Ideology: Neo-Nazism; Primordialism; Third Position; Anti-Zionism; Antiziganism
- Political position: Far-right
- Colours: Black; White; Red
- Slogan: "Free, Social, National!" (Russian: «Свободный, Социальный, Национальный!»)

Party flag

Website
- Telegram page

The Ethnic National Union (ENU) (Note: Russian: Этническое национальное объединение; Ukrainian: Етнічне національне об'єднання; Belarusian: Этнічнае нацыянальнае аб'яднаньне.) is a decentralized, neo-Nazi political organization active in Russia, Ukraine and Belarus. It was initially an informal association created on the principles of anonymity by a number of former activists of the National Socialist Society, former members of an Azov Regiment, as well as a number of members of other far-right groups.

It has a number of regional cells, in particular, in Moscow, Irkutsk, Rostov-on-Don, and Saint Petersburg. According to the law enforcement agencies of the Russian Federation, it is based in Kyiv, where it systematically coordinates the actions of nationalists when carrying out actions of "direct action" against persons of non-Slavic appearance and state authorities. Propaganda work is carried out in the Telegram messenger, VK and Instagram social networks.

The organization has declared its task to create a network of decentralized "resistance" cells on the territory of Europe, to build an ethnic Neo-Nazi community based on the ideology of primordialism.

== Composition ==
The main structure of the organization consists of autonomous groups of neo-Nazis, local Skinhead movement natives and youth representatives dissatisfied with state policy. The exact number of members of the organization varies from source to source; this is due to the fact that the organization itself does not collect personal data and does not calculate the number of its members.

The organization actively supports the activities of such international representatives of Neo-Nazism as: Maxim Bazylev, Dmitry Borovikov, Maxim "Tesak" Marcinkevich, Dylann Roof, and others (which is stated more than once on the official resources of the organization).

== Structure ==
According to Russia’s FSB, the organizational structure of the Ethnic National Union divides its activities into three main sections:

1. Social and public activities
2. Political and agitation activities
3. Radical activities

Such a separation structure is due to the implementation of several projects both in the Internet platform and in the social and public business. Activities in each part of the organizational structure are monitored and planned in different ways, depending on the type of activity and the timing of its implementation. Also, each section of the structure has its own internal rules and principles in addition to the already existing general ones (the priority is exactly what is stipulated in the section).

=== Decentralized management system ===
A decentralized management system in the structural system of an Ethnic National Union is used to distribute powers among different levels of management (departments, categories and groups of people). So, thanks to such a structure, problems that have arisen at the lower level of the organizational structure are solved under the control and with the help of participants who are at this level (in order to avoid stagnation in the activities of the movement). Also, in the absence of specific tasks (set by higher departments in a structural hierarchical system), activities at the lower levels of the organization are not suspended, but are transferred to full autonomy of the group. In the absence of these tasks, the participants of the Ethnic National Association at the autonomous level continue their agitation activities, social work and actions.

According to representatives of the Ethnic National Association:

1. The management and activities of such an organization should not be stopped or regulated by any specific scales. One of the main tasks of an Ethnic National Union is to extend its influence to all available sectors of the public (be it politics, economics or other socio-social structures)
2. Managing such an organization centrally becomes more and more difficult each time because of the scale to which it aspires.
3. With decentralization, the right to make decisions passes to the specialist who is best acquainted with the problem or task set by the organization.
4. Decentralization stimulates the participants' own initiative, helps to prepare previously incompetent members of the movement for higher positions, giving them the opportunity to make important decisions from the very moment they join the organization. Such a system will provide the organization with the necessary number of talented and ideological participants of the movement in the future.

== Activities ==
The main political direction of the organization is the propaganda and agitation of the ideology of Neo-Nazism and primordialism. To do this, ENU representatives use various social platforms, where they try to spread their ideas with the help of individual historical and political articles, as well as video, photo or audio materials. The organization actively uses all kinds of ways to spread and search for new participants for ideological "recruitment" into its ranks (its representatives are also looking for foreign contacts with European identitarianists).

In addition, the Ethnic National Union is known for its connection with a number of actions of extremist and terrorist orientation, the connection with which the organization rejects, but on the application for the detention of its alleged participant in Barnaul the organization stated:

"We fully support such methods of struggle and will continue to do everything possible to continue their implementation."

The organization originates from the creation of the political and news resource "BREZG" in 2018, where future members of the organization spread their ideological propaganda.

On 8 November 2018, ENO participants held an action "In Memory of the White Movement" dedicated to Alexander Kolchak in Irkutsk.

On 6 November 2018, representatives of the organization interviewed the leader of the former neo-Nazi group Schultz-88 – Dmitry Bobrov, under the name of "BREZG". After the alleged organization of the shooting at Lubyanka, operatives of the Centre E and the Service for the Protection of the Constitutional Order and the Fight against Terrorism of the FSB in St. Petersburg and the Leningrad Region paid a visit to 40-year-old Petersburger Dmitry Bobrov.

On 7 December 2018, an informal association "Ethnic National Union" was created.

On 9 February 2019, the organization was actively attempting to create an autonomous cell in Moscow (as stated on its official resource).

Since the beginning of February 2019, members of the organization have been participating in actions to support the release of Vladimir Kvachkov near the court of Mordovia.

On 18 March 2019, the organization translated Brenton Tarrant's manifesto into Russian; this translation of the manifesto began to be massively distributed throughout the CIS.

Since 15 April 2019, ENU has been holding a series of closed lectures of an extremist orientation, during which methods of combating law enforcement agencies are discussed, and the organization also announces recruitment to its ranks in the territory of the Russian Federation.

On 22 April 2019, Roskomnadzor blocks access to the official website of the organization, by the decision of the Zheleznodorozhniy District Court of Krasnoyarsk.

Since August 2019, the organization has been massively conducting propaganda raids on the territory of Russia, Ukraine and Belarus, using leaflets, stickers and graffiti.

On 15 December 2019, a number of participants of the organization held charity events to help orphanages in Ukraine and Russia.

On 22 December 2019, there was a Shooting near the FSB building in Moscow, the participants of which are associated with an Ethnic National Association.

On 26 June 2020, an attempt to set fire to a mosque in Odesa was prevented. The SBU declared that participants of an Ethnic National Union were involved in this terrorist act. Later in the same month, a number of arson attacks on shawarma shops by "unknown neo-Nazis" will take place in Odesa.

On 16 July 2020, unknown persons set fire to the car of the chairman of the regional organization of the National Corps party Denis Yantar. At the same time, an ironic post with "congratulations to Denis" appears on the site of the ENO Internet resource. The National Corps itself is confident that the perpetrators are political opponents from among those who previously "poured urine" on Yevgeny Strokan, a like-minded person involved in the case of the attack on journalists "Shariy.net" by Vitaly Regor. In turn, the representative of the nationalist organization S14, Yevgeny Karas, blames ENU activists for this incident.

On 26 October 2020, ENU attempts to disrupt the Odesa local elections by leaving a dummy improvised explosive device in the building of the regional state administration.

17 November 2020, the Security Service of Ukraine prevents the spread of ENU extremist literature.

On 2 April 2021, an alleged participant of an Ethnic National Union was detained, who was preparing explosives for an action to intimidate the Muslim population in Altai.

In the course of its activities, photos and videos from "radical" actions periodically appear on the organization's resources, which can capture a number of offenses against national minorities, representatives of the Roma diaspora, LGBT minorities, etc. The organization also distributes video materials with actions of arson of various public buildings and structures, acts of vandalism against monuments of The Holocaust victims.

== Ideology ==
Ethnosism or ethnic nationalism is a political ideology of the Ethnic National Union, which aims to divide nations and their nationalities into ethnic groups. An ethnos in the understanding of ethnic nationalism is an association of nations of blood kinship with the aim of restoring a primordial cultural and historical statehood. Ethnic nationalism accepts the creation of a racial association (for example, the Caucasian white race) from ethnic associations (Slavic ethnos, Germanic ethnos, Romanesque ethnos ...) and individual nations. According to the definition of ethnic nationalism, every representative of the people, as well as the nation, should be in the cultural and historical homeland of his race.

== Persecution ==
The organization was called extremist, encouraging "terrorist methods of combating autocracy" by a number of news resources of the Russian Federation and Ukraine. The organization was also called extremist by representatives of the Federal Security Service, and the Security Service of Ukraine. In several documents and materials, the Ethnic National Association is associated with the creation and coordination of another extremist group – the MCU, which is allegedly related to 11 murders of persons of non-Slavic appearance on the territory of the Moscow and Leningrad regions.

The organization itself completely rejects the data provided by the law enforcement agencies of the Russian Federation and Ukraine, possible members of this community were detained during the organization's preparation for the explosion of a mosque in Barnaul and a failed attempt to set fire to a mosque in Odesa (at the same time, the very statement that representatives of ENO were detained in Odesa is rejected by the organization). Officially, the activities of an Ethnic National Association are not prohibited, the organization is not listed in the register as extremist or terrorist, but at the same time attempts are systematically made to capture its participants (during criminal prosecution for propaganda of fascism and extremism).
