= Combat Organization =

Combat Organization (Russian: Боева́я Организа́ция, Polish: Organizacja Bojowa) is a name that has been used by several armed political movements in Russia and Poland, including:

- The Combat Organization of the Party of Socialist Revolutionaries (1902–1911)
- The Combat Organization of the Polish Socialist Party (1904–1911)
- The Bolshevik Military and Battle Organizations (1905–1918)
- The Jewish Combat Organization (1942–?), a Jewish partisan group active in Warsaw during WWII
- The Combat Terrorist Organization (2003–2006), a Russian neo-Nazi gang
- The Battle Organization of Russian Nationalists (2007–2011), another Russian neo-Nazi group
- The Combat Organization of Anarcho-Communists (c. 2020–present as of 2024), a Russian anarchist organization
