= Russism =

Russism may refer to:

- Russianism, a linguistic influence of the Russian language
- Russism (ideology), an ideology propagated by Aleksandr Ivanov-Sukharevsky
- Rashism, or "Russian fascism", a theory that Russia has been transformed into a fascist or neo-fascist country

== See also ==
- Russian fascism (disambiguation)
