= Format18 =

Russian far-right extremist group

Format18 Формат18
- Abbreviation: F18
- Leader: Maxim Martsinkevich
- Founded: 2005
- Banned: 20 December 2010
- Split from: People's National Party
- Ideology: Neo-Nazism; Russian ultranationalism Anti-immigration; Islamophobia; Caucasophobia; Anti-Black racism
- Political position: Far-right
- National affiliation: National Socialist Society
- Colours: Black; Green

Website
- format18.freeforums.net

Format18 (F18; Russian: Формат18) was a Russian neo-Nazi group based in the capital Moscow. It was led by Maxim "Tesak" Martsinkevich, and had close relations with the political party National Socialist Society.

== Background ==
Format18 was initially formed under the name "Creative Studio Format-18" sometime during the end of 2005 in Moscow by Russian racist skinhead Maxim Martsinkevich. The number "18" in the group's name was selected as an alphanumeric code which corresponds to "AH", the initials of Adolf Hitler – with "A" being the 1st letter of the Latin alphabet and "H" being the 8th.

The site was initially intended as an internet forum for Russian neo-Nazis, but Martsinkevich and his fellow neo-Nazi associates eventually started to upload their own video blogs to the site that discussed the far-right subculture, weightlifting, and paramilitary training. They would also interview bystanders about their views on the presence of non-Slavic immigrants in the Russian Federation. Martsinkevich also published videos of him and other Russian white supremacists promoting hatred towards Afro-Russians and antifascists – sometimes portrayed in fictional acting scenarios.

Maxim Martsinkevich, along with many other individuals affiliated with Format18 had a reputation for recording numerous attacks and even some murders that were carried out on ethnic minorities, immigrants, non-Russians, transients, prostitutes, and similar victims alike. Additionally, its members would film humiliating interviews of their political opponents (typically militant antifascists, leftists, and homosexuals) while subjecting them to degradation and abuse. Videos featured on the F18 website were often sold and distributed by the group for profit. It was such types of controversial content that organization attracted widespread attention for.

A vast selection of far-right political music by various neo-Nazi bands and white power artists were also available for purchase. Many of these songs can be heard playing in the background of the videos that were uploaded.

== Dissolution and legacy ==
The Israel-based neo-Nazi skinhead group Patrol 36 committed a series of violent crimes that were directly inspired by Format18. Furthermore, self-produced video recordings of the gang’s attacks on ethnic minorities, homosexuals and Jews were uploaded to the Format18 website.

Format18 was officially designated as an extremist organization in late 2010 by the Moscow City Court which resulted in the banning of the group and removal of the format18.org website.

F18 are often credited with popularizing the trend of filming attacks on immigrants and subsequently uploading them to the internet, which has become a popular practice amongst Russian neo-Nazi circles.

Maxim Martsinkevich and Format18 are said to have been the inspiration behind the 2009 mockumentary film Russia 88.

The organization has been featured in several documentaries about neo-Nazis in Russia, including From Russia With Hate, Credit For Murder, and Ross Kemp on Gangs.

After the beginning of the Russian invasion of Ukraine, the Format 18 battalion was formed in the Armed Forces of Ukraine, it consists of former members of Format 18. The group is headed by Artem Krasnolutsky «Uragan» who led the Voronezh Format 18 squad until he fled to Ukraine due to a criminal case against him.

== See also ==
- Combat Organization of Russian Nationalists
- Combat Terrorist Organization
- NS/WP Crew
- National Socialist Society
- The Savior (paramilitary organization)
- Primorsky Partisans
