= Moscow FSB headquarters shooting =

2019 mass shooting in Moscow, Russia

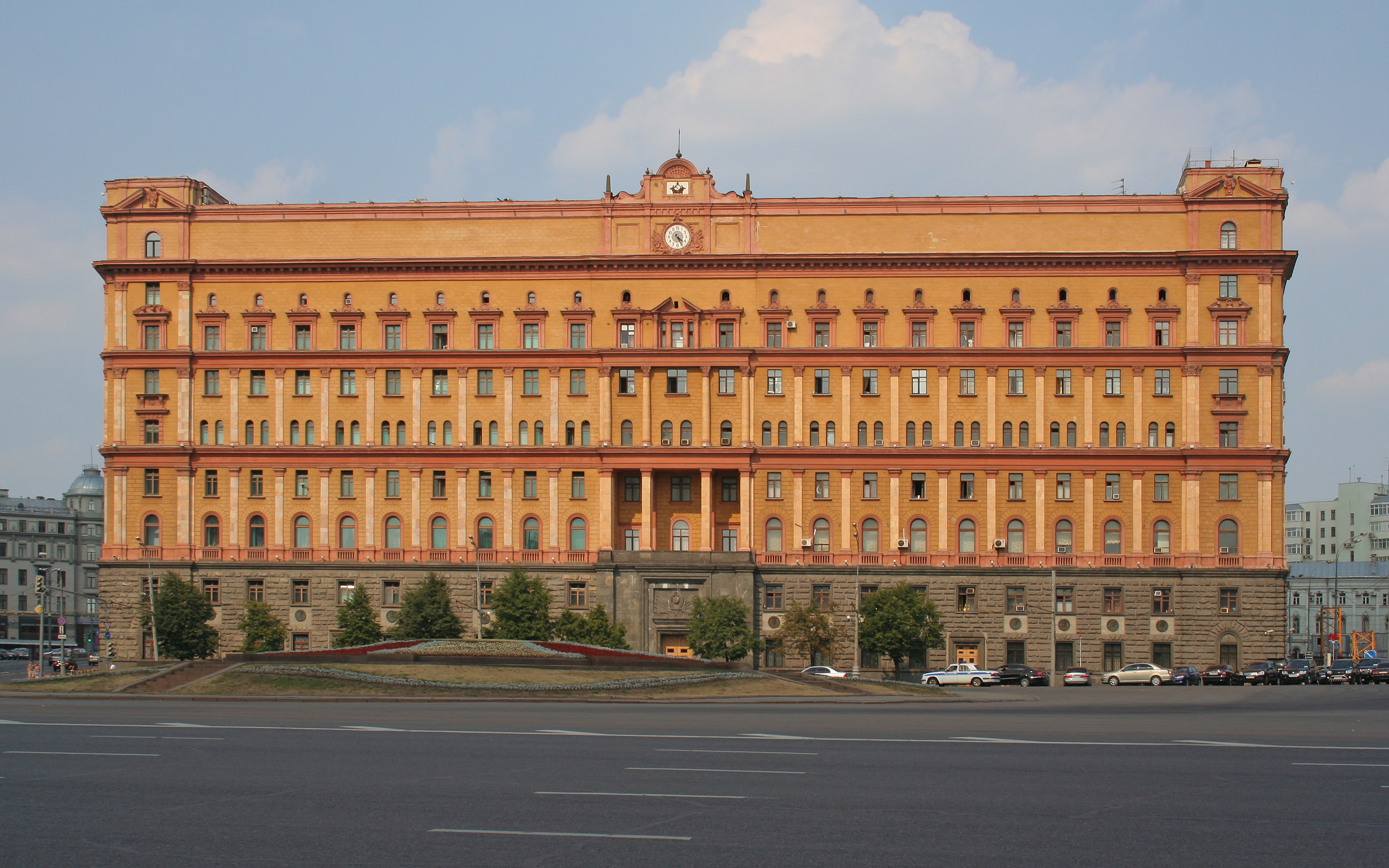
- Facade of the Federal Security Service's headquarters
- Location: 54.0566°N 47.1171°E; Moscow, Russia
- Date: 19 December 2019; 6 years ago
- Attack type: Mass shooting, shootout
- Weapon: Saiga 7.62 semi-automatic rifle
- Deaths: 3 (including the perpetrator)
- Injuries: 5
- Assailants: Yevgeny Manyurov, Atomwaffen Division (alleged)

The Moscow FSB headquarters shooting took place on the evening of 19 December 2019 near the headquarters of Russia's Federal Security Service (FSB) in the center of Moscow. Two people were killed and four people were injured when Yevgeny Manyurov opened fire before he was shot dead by a sniper.

== Events ==
The first reports of the incident were controversial. During the shooting, the attacker was shot dead by a sniper. One FSB operator died on the spot, another died the next day and a few more people were injured. One bystander was slightly injured. After the incident, security officials displayed aggression to the reporters covering the event.

The attack took place on the eve of the security services day, when President Putin was at a festive concert dedicated to this day, and the shooting also came hours after Putin's annual press conference. The attacker was identified as Yevgeny Manyurov (Russian: Евгений Манюров), 39, who was from a small town near Moscow. Due to the inconsistency of the special services, the shooting continued after Manyurov was killed; this may have led to additional casualties.

Soon after the shooting, there was report that the attacker "was shouting slogans typical of Islamic State", but in his apartment, insignia of the NOD movement, known for its provocations against the opposition, was found, along with indications that he was a member of a Neo-Nazi group called the Ethnic National Union. The shooter also possessed propaganda books printed by Atomwaffen Division. The Investigative Committee of Russia opened a criminal investigation into an attempt on the life of a law enforcement officer.

== Sources ==
- The Moscow FSB Shooting: What We Know So Far
- Gunman who attacked FSB building 'was firearms enthusiast'
- Нападение на Лубянку. Главное Причина атаки на ФСБ неизвестна. Ее не расследуют как теракт
