= Patrol 36 =

Neo-Nazi organization in Israel

- Formation: 2005
- Dissolved: September 2007
- Type: Skinheads; Neo-Nazism; Antisemitism
- Location: Israel
- Members: At least 10
- Leader: Eli Bonite

Patrol 36 (Hebrew: פטרול 36, [paˈtrol ʃloˈʃim ve ˈʃeʃ], Russian: Патруль 36, [pɐˈtrulʲ ˈtrʲit͡sətʲ ˈʂɛstʲ]) was an Israeli neo-Nazi skinhead organization, consisting of 9 members, led by Eli Bonite (born Erik Bunyatov in 1988), alias "Ely the Nazi" (Hebrew: אלי הנאצי Eli ha-Natsi, Russian: Нацист Эли Natsist Eli). The group's members were Russian immigrants that had Jewish roots aged 16 to 21, and mostly followers of Slavic Neopaganism. According to The Daily Telegraph, the men's families were allowed to settle in Israel under the Law of Return.

== Activities ==
Patrol 36 was active between 2005 and September 2007. Inspired by the Russian neo-Nazi group Format18, its members desecrated buildings, especially synagogues, with swastikas and graffiti, and carried out attacks on migrant workers from Africa and Asia, drug users, members of the LGBT+ community, and Haredi Jews. Patrol 36's members reportedly had tattoos with the number 88 (a reference to the phrase "Heil Hitler"), and were stockpiling guns, TNT, knives and portraits of Adolf Hitler. The group produced videos of their own attacks, which were found on computers seized by police.

In the homes of those arrested, police also found links to neo-Nazi websites, neo-Nazi films, and photos of members in Nazi uniforms. The group planned to celebrate the birthday of Adolf Hitler in front of Yad Vashem, a Holocaust memorial site. According to police, Patrol 36 maintained connections with neo-Nazi organisations in other countries.

One of the group's members, Ivan Kuzmin, said that in Ukraine "they called me things like dirty Jew... and here they called me stinky Russian". Kuzmin's grandmother was a Holocaust survivor. He said that the racism he experienced turned him into a racist. The leader of the group, Eli Bonite, was recorded on wiretapped conversations saying "my grandfather was a half-Jewboy. I will not have children so that this trash will not be born with even a tiny per cent of Jewboy blood". The cell was based in Petah Tikva, near Tel Aviv, where they all lived.

It was revealed later, after their arrest, that the main inspiration for the organization's activities was the Russian Neo-Nazi group Format18. Also, Patrol 36 members used to upload their videos and publish them on Format18's website, as well as on YouTube.

== Arrest ==
Israeli Police began investigating the group in 2006, after two incidents of Neo-Nazi graffiti in Petah Tikva. On 9 September 2007, eight of the group's members were arrested, while one of the group's members fled the country. Police also seized computers depicting videos of their attacks that they had filmed, Neo-Nazi related materials, such as swastika posters and Neo-Nazi films, along with explosives and an improvised pistol.

They were charged with conspiracy to commit a crime, assault, racial incitement, and distribution of racist materials, and tried in the Tel Aviv District Court. All group's members were found guilty, and received sentences ranging between one and seven years in prison. While reading the verdict, Judge Tsvi Gurfinkel said that he was imposing severe penalties to deter anyone else from following their example. Eli Bonite received a seven-year prison term. In January 2011, Dmitri Bogotich, the last suspected group member, was extradited to Israel from Kyrgyzstan.

== Reaction ==
Coverage of the group was widespread in Israel, and the uncovering of the organisation led to a strong reaction in Israeli society. Major news channels and newspapers comprehensively covered the story, in a manner that was considered reflective of a wider, disproportionate moral panic.

Their discovery led to renewed consideration amongst politicians to amend the Law of Return. Effi Eitam of the National Religious Party and the National Union, which represent the religious Zionist movement and have previously attempted to advance bills to amend the Law of Return, stated that Israel has become "a haven for people who hate Israel, hate Jews, and exploit the Law of Return to act on this hatred".

While issuing his verdict, Judge Tsvi Gurfinkel stated, "the fact that they are Jews from the ex-Soviet Union and that they had sympathised with individuals who believed in racist theories is terrible". The BBC reported that the news of the attacks and of the men's arrests in 2007 "shocked the nation", as Israel was founded in the wake of the Holocaust. One of the members who was arrested and sentenced was the grandson of a Holocaust survivor.

The Anti-Defamation League (ADL) condemned Patrol 36, characterized the group as marginal, and urged Israeli citizens to not stigmatize the community of Russian Jews in Israel in reaction to the incident.

== See also ==
- Racism in Israel
- Self-hating Jew
  - Dan Burros
  - Davis Wolfgang Hawke
  - Gerard Menuhin
  - Frank Collin
  - Harold von Braunhut
- Jewish collaboration with Nazi Germany
  - Association of German National Jews
  - German Vanguard
  - Jewish Ghetto Police
  - Judenrat
  - Kapo
  - Lehi (militant group)
- Boot Boys
- Jackie Arklöv
- Leo Felton
- Self-hatred
