= Murder of Khursheda Sultonova =

2004 murder of a Tajik child in Russia

Khursheda Yusufovna Sultonova
- Хуршеда Юсуфовна Султонова
- Born: September 13, 1995; Dushanbe, Tajikistan
- Died: February 9, 2004 (aged 8); Saint Petersburg, Russia
- Known for: Victim of a hate-crime murder in Saint Petersburg

The murder of eight-year-old Tajik girl Khursheda Sultonova was committed in Saint Petersburg on 9 February 2004 by Russian neo-Nazis, members of the extremist group sometimes referred to as the "Combat Terrorist Organization", led by Dmitry Borovikov. The crime caused wide public outcry in Russia; media often referred to it as "the murder of the Tajik girl".

== Murder ==
Khursheda Yusufovna Sultonova (Note: In this name that follows East Slavic naming customs, the patronymic is Yusufovna and the family name is Sultonova.) was born in Dushanbe on 13 September 1995. She lived with her family in central Saint Petersburg, on Boytsov Lane near the Yusupov Garden.

On 9 February 2004, she was returning with her father, Yusuf Sultonov, and her cousin Alabir from the ice rink in Yusupov Garden. At about 9 p.m., as they approached their home, a group of teenagers attacked them from behind. The attackers knocked Sultonov to the ground and began beating him. Alabir managed to hide under a car, while Khursheda ran toward the entrance of their building, screaming. The assailants caught her and inflicted eleven stab wounds, from which she died. During the attack, residents of the courtyard heard shouts of "Get out of Russia!" and "Beat the blacks!" Sultonov and his nephew Alabir confirmed the shouting in their testimony.

The murder drew significant public attention, and then–governor of Saint Petersburg Valentina Matviyenko placed the investigation under special oversight.

== Investigation and trial ==
In the spring of 2005, eight teenagers living in the neighborhood where the attack occurred were arrested on suspicion of involvement. Only one of them—a student at a special school for troubled adolescents who had turned fourteen by the time of the crime—was charged with murder motivated by ethnic hatred. The others were charged with hooliganism.

In March 2006, a jury of the Saint Petersburg City Court acquitted the defendant charged with murder for lack of proof, while finding him and six other teenagers guilty of hooliganism. The eighth defendant was acquitted. The seven convicted received sentences ranging from one and a half to five and a half years in a penal colony. The decision drew considerable criticism.

In May 2006, members of the extremist group known as the "Combat Terrorist Organization", led by Dmitry Borovikov (who was killed during his arrest), were detained in Saint Petersburg. The detainees confessed to investigators that they were the ones who killed Khursheda Sultonova.

In 2011, twelve members of the group were found guilty by a jury of multiple murders (including that of Khursheda Sultonova), banditry, and illegal possession of weapons. Two members—Alexey Voyevodin and Artyom Prokhorenko—were sentenced to life imprisonment; others received terms ranging from three to eighteen years, and several received suspended sentences.
