= Maxim Bazylev =

Russian nationalist (1980–2009)

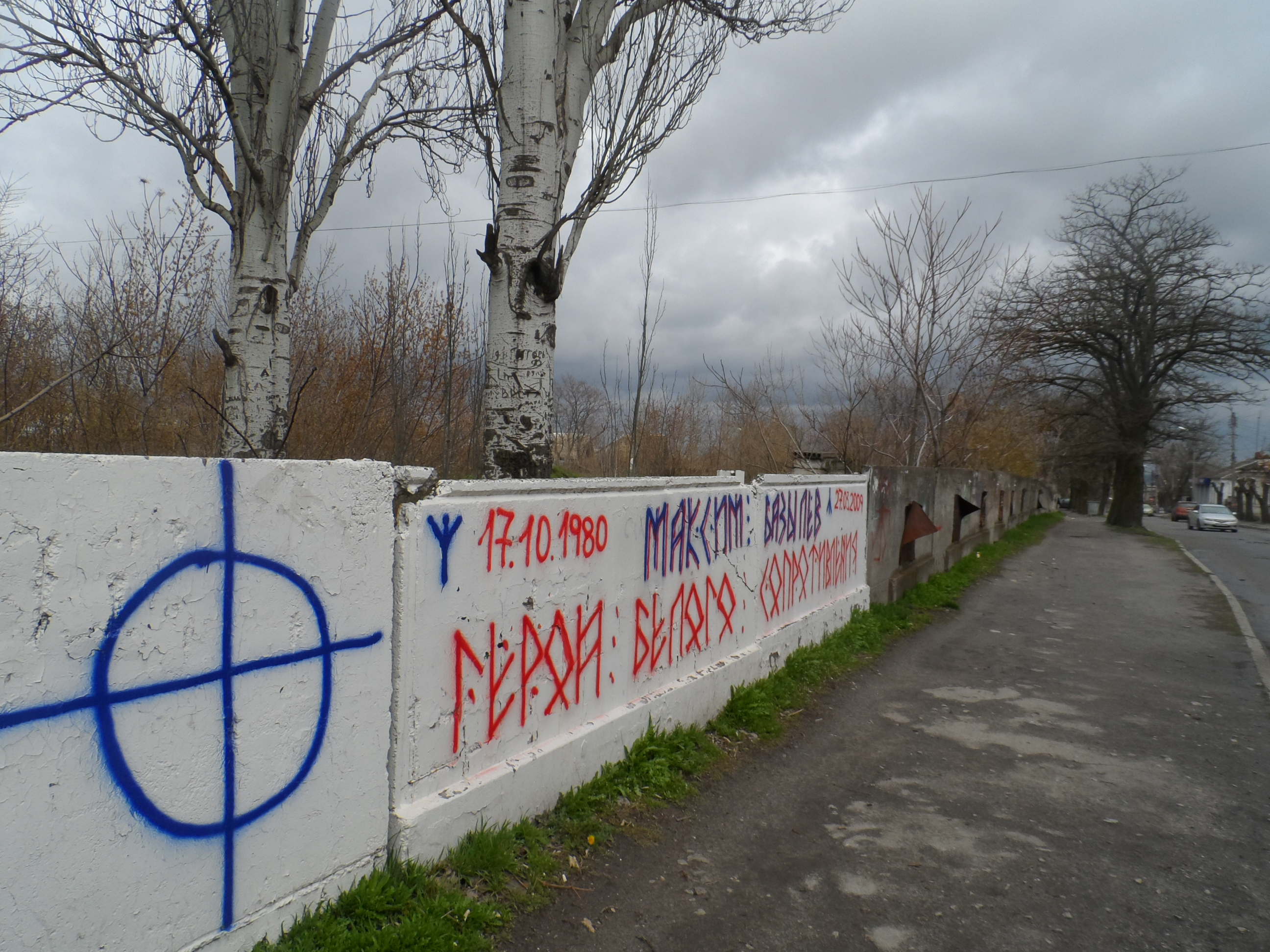
Melitopol

Maxim Bazylev (Romanov; also known as Adolf; 17 October 1980 - 27 March 2009) was a Russian nationalist, founder of the magazine Russian Will (Russian: Русская воля), and last leader of the NSO (Russian: Национал-социалистическое общество). The FSB believed Bazylev to be the organizer of the Pushkin and Sergiev Posad groups, whose members are accused of committing over 30 murders.

With Bazylev in prison was a co-defendant, 21-year-old student of the Higher School of Economics Roman Zheleznov (Zuhel). Both were charged with eight murders. Bazylev committed suicide in his cell at Petrovka 38 metropolitan detention center by slitting the veins on his forearms and neck.
