= Russia 88 =

- Directed by: Pavel Bardin
- Produced by: Pavel Bardin; Vasiliy Solovyov; Pyotr Fyodorov
- Starring: Pyotr Fyodorov
- Release date: January 28, 2009
- Running time: 104 min.
- Country: Russia

Russia 88 (Russian: Россия 88, romanized: Rossiya 88) is a 2009 Russian mockumentary film directed by Russian film director Pavel Bardin about Russian neo-Nazis. It was screened in the Panorama section at the Berlin International Film Festival. Director Pavel Bardin won the Discovery of the Year Nika Award for the picture.

In the film, members of a gang called Russia 88, a gang of skinheads, are entertained by filming their beatings of people of non-Slavic appearance, to be released on the Internet. After a while, they become accustomed to the camera and stop paying attention to it. The leader of the gang, Spike, discovers that his sister is dating a Southern Caucasian man. This family drama develops into a tragedy.

The movie has no ending credits, but a list of people killed by skinheads in Russia in 2008 at the end, playing over silence.

Russian director Pavel Bardin was inspired to make the film by the skinhead group Format18, founded by Maxim Martsinkevich.
