= Dmitry Borovikov =

Russian neo-Nazi pagan (1984–2006)

- Дмитрий Боровиков
- Borokivov, on the left side of the image.
- Born: June 9, 1984; Leningrad, Russian SFSR, Soviet Union
- Died: May 18, 2006 (aged 21); Saint Petersburg, Russia
- Cause of death: Gunshot wound
- Other names: Kislyi; Kolovrat
- Status: Deceased
- Motive: Racially motivated; maintaining the material base of the extremist community
- Convictions: Organization and execution of beatings and murders (in particular racially motivated); calls for ethnic hatred and extremism; creation of extremist and terrorist groups; robbery

Details
- Span of crimes: Late 1990s – 2006
- Locations: Saint Petersburg and Zahodskoe, Russia

Dmitry Alexandrovich Borovikov (Russian: Дмитрий Александрович Боровиков), also known by the nicknames "Kislyi" ("Sour") and "Kolovrat" (9 June 1984 – 18 May 2006), was a Russian neo-Nazi and neopagan, the organizer of the extremist groups "Mad Crowd" and "Combat Terrorist Organization" (Russian: Боевая Террористическая Организация; БТО; Boevaya Terroristicheskaya Organizaciya, BTO). In his position, he organized and perpetrated several racially motivated murders, including the murder of 8-year-old girl Khursheda Sultonova in 2004. Borovikov was fatally shot while being apprehended by operatives of the 18th department of the UBOP on 18 May 2006.

== Biography ==
Dmitry Borovikov was born in Leningrad to a Russian family of a criminal investigation officer of the Admiralty District Department of Internal Affairs. He lived in house 4 in Boytsov Lane. After finishing school, he entered the law faculty of the Regional University, where he studied for 2.5 years.

=== Schultz-88 ===
At the age of 16, Borovikov met Dmitry Bobrov (nicknamed "Schulz"). For his love of heavy music and the band Kiss, Borovikov received the nickname "Kislyi" (Russian: Кислый, lit. 'Sour, Acidic'). In the summer of 2001, Borovikov joined Schulz-88, where he became the "right hand" of the leader. Borovikov stood at the origins of Schulz-88 and took an active part in all the significant actions of 2001–2002 and actively engaged in propaganda.

Borovikov wrote many articles for the magazines Made in St. Petersburg and Gnev Peruna (The Wrath of Perun), such as "Zhyoltaya ugroza" (The Yellow Threat), "Argumenty i fakty" (Arguments and Facts), Sovety nachinayushchim shturmovikam" (Advice for Beginner Stormtroopers), "Perunov den'" (Perun's Day), "Strizheno? Net, brito!" (Haircut? No, Shaved!), and others. Borovikov also participated in the publication of the magazine Gnev Peruna #5. He published his own magazine Straight Edge - Shotrm Chistoy Krovi. In Schulz-88, Borovikov met Alexey Voevodin; subsequently, their views diverged with Schulz-88 and they left the group.

=== Mad Crowd ===
In 2002, Borovikov participated in the creation of the Mad Crowd Firm. The main divergence of the new group from Schulz-88 was its emphasis on healthy living, sympathy for the football movement, and the desire to establish connections with neo-Nazis from other countries.

In his journal Gnev Peruna, he once wrote:

We don't need you, we need your children. It is from them that we will raise a new race. Because you can't be changed anymore. TV, family, shabby entertainment, fashionable clothes, a stocked refrigerator... if this is all that interests whites today, then what kind of whites are they? They are meat and trash. The white race must be created from scratch.

=== Combat Terrorist Organization ===
By 2003, Borovikov believed that to achieve his goals, he needed to act with secrecy. He created a new group with strict criteria for joining: racism, paganism, and a healthy lifestyle.

His interest in football waned at this stage and he was interested in killing his "enemies" rather than merely beating them. Journalists dubbed his new group the "Combat Terrorist Organization" (BTO). In total, the BTO consisted of 10 people. According to the 18th department of the Department of Internal Affairs, "at first, there were six of them, then nine, and at the end it seems to be eleven people. But only the leaders themselves knew how many exactly. In Schulz and the Mad Crowd, everyone bragged about their exploits left and right. By and large, this is what they all got arrested for. But here, the conspiracy was so tough that it is impossible to get to the truth even now".

=== Murders 2004 ===
Borovikov was arrested in 2004 in connection with the high-profile case of Tajik girl Khursheda Sultonova, who was killed on 9 February near his home. The arrest took place three hours after the murder. Traces of blood were found on his clothes, but they were thoroughly washed with gasoline, and therefore it was not possible to identify this blood with the blood of the deceased. It was suggested that Borovikov managed to evade responsibility thanks to the connections of his father, a police officer.

On 7 June, Borovikov organized the execution of two of his former associates, Rostislav Hoffman and Alexey Golovchenko, in the forest near the village of Zakhodskoye in the Vyborg district. They were wounded with a crossbow and killed with knives. The immediate perpetrators of the murder were Alexey Voyevodin, Roman Orlov, and Artyom Prokhorenko. On 19 June, Borovikov's associates Andrey Kostrachenkov and Artyom Prokhorenko killed scientist Nikolai Girenko. Borovikov was allegedly involved in this crime, as he had spoken unflatteringly about Girenko:

Girenko is a Russophobe, an anti-fascist, and an expert. Our guys are in jail because of his expertise.

In 2004, a criminal case was opened against Mad Crowd. Almost all members of the group were arrested, except for Dmitry Borovikov and Ruslan Melnik. They were accused of creating an "extremist community." The investigation was able to prove only a few episodes of attacks.

=== In hiding ===
On 25 April 2005, Borovikov was put on the international wanted list for extremism with the note "especially dangerous" and "may actively resist arrest". While on the run, Borovikov and other gang members began robbing post offices to support their financial situation, and articles for armed robberies of post offices, banditry, robberies, and kidnappings were added to the criminal case. Borovikov directly participaed in the publication of the magazines "Smell of Hatred", "Kill or be killed", and "Oskal". On December 18, 2005, Borovikov's daughter, Anna Borovikova, was born.

On 7 April 2006, Borovikov organized the murder of Samba Lampsar (1978–2006), a Senegalese fifth-year student at the Bonch-Bruevich St. Petersburg State University and one of the leaders of African Unity, as he was leaving the Apollo nightclub (12 Izmailovsky Prospekt). The murder was directly committed by Andrey Malyugin near the house 17 on the 5th Krasnoarmeyskaya Street. The murder weapon was a pump-action shotgun, which was left at the crime scene. A swastika and the phrases "skinhead weapon", and "death to blacks", and other similar inscriptions were scrawled on the butt of the shotgun.

=== Death ===
On 18 May 2006, Borovikov was sitting in the courtyard with his girlfriend at the house No. 23 on Planernaya Street. When he saw a group of people in civilian clothes approaching him, he realized that they were police officers trying to detain him. According to a representative of the St. Petersburg prosecutor's office, Borovikov attacked the police officers with a knife. The officers then shot him, causing him to fall to the ground, bleeding. Borovikov died almost immediately after the ambulance arrived.

Borovikov was buried at the Northern Cemetery without a funeral service, as he was a neo-pagan. About 20 people gathered at the funeral ceremony. Borovikov's grave became a place of pilgrimage for Russian neo-Nazis.

=== Beliefs ===
Borovikov considered himself to be a "Skin movement" and professed the ideas of WP (White Power). In his opinion, the authorities in Russia are a branch of ZOG the Zionist Occupation Government. He called St. Petersburg "Nevograd" and considered his main enemies "colored" people, "khachiks" (Russian ethnic slur for the native peoples of the South Caucasus) and "churki" (Russian ethnic slur for the native peoples of Central Asia), who, mixing with "stupid russian women", produced mestizos. Direct action in the form of street attacks on "non-russians", in his opinion, could "help cleanse the people of foreign-race elements and turn the Russian Federation into "White Rus'".

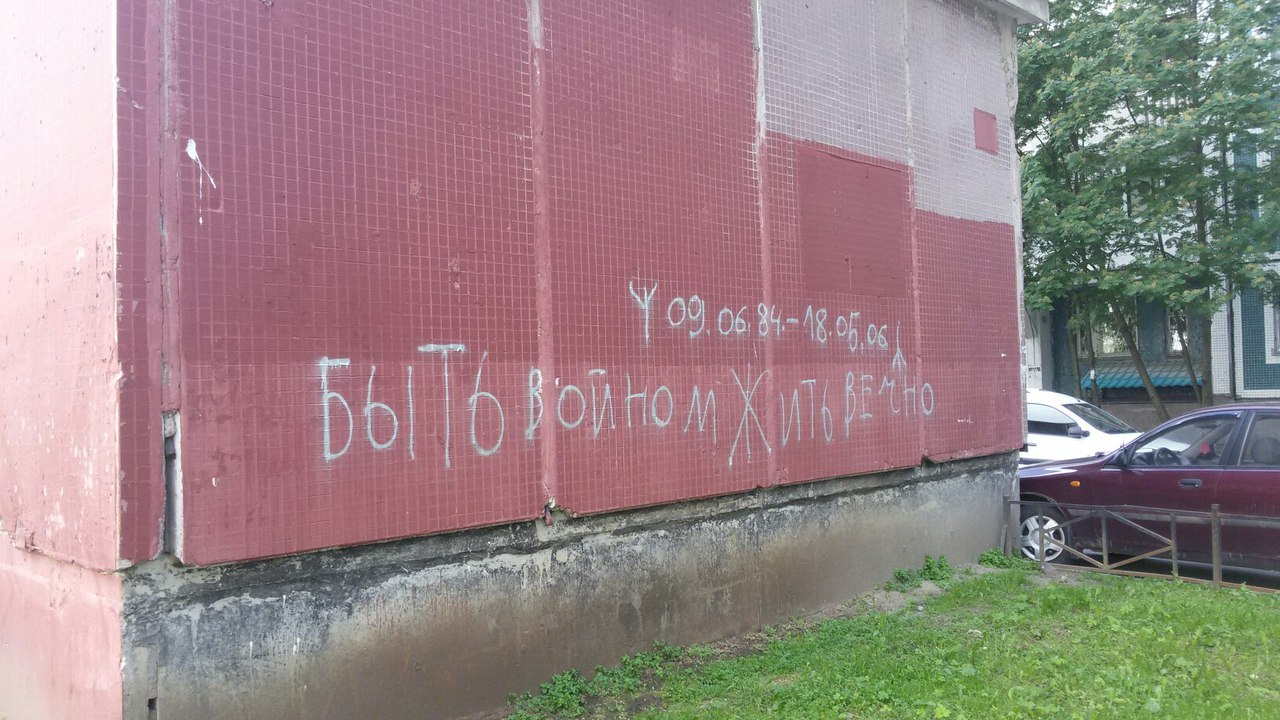
"To be a warrior is to live forever". Graffiti on a transformer booth near the place of Dmitry Borovikov's death, this slogan is used by Russian neo-Nazis as a tribute to one of the leaders of the BTO.

== See also ==
- Combat Terrorist Organization
