= Nikolai Girenko =

Russian ethnologist and human rights activist (1940–2004)

- Николай Гиренко
- Born: 31 October 1940; Leningrad, Russian SFSR, Soviet Union (now Saint Petersburg, Russia)
- Died: 19 June 2004 (aged 63); Saint Petersburg, Russia
- Cause of death: Assassination by gunshot

Nikolai Mikhailovich Girenko (Russian: Николай Михайлович Гиренко; 31 October 1940 – 19 June 2004) was a Russian ethnologist and human rights activist.

== Biography ==
Nikolai Girenko was born in 1940 in Leningrad. He graduated in African Studies from Leningrad University's Oriental Institute in 1967. From 1967 to 1970 he worked as a translator for Soviet specialists working in Tanzania. In 1970 he began working for the Institute of Ethnography in Leningrad. Girenko received recognition in the USSR for his ethnology and African studies. Girenko taught in the university and worked for Kunstkamera.

Saint Petersburg's citizens elected Girenko to the first democratic Lensovet in 1990–1993. Girenko participated in the ethnic minorities' rights group of this legislative body and chaired a similar committee of the Saint Petersburg Union of Scientists.

Girenko managed scientific and education programs meant to foster tolerance and counter-act chauvinism. He and others organized the European Conference for the Rights of Ethnic Minorities, the first of its kind in Russia, in 1991.

Girenko organized workshops on legal counter-acting the nationalistic extremism in the city of St. Petersburg. He also expressed concern about the rights of the Russian-speaking population in the Baltic states. He participated in international human rights defenders' congresses.

He provided more than twenty expert examinations at the request of Moscow and St. Petersburg law enforcement bodies and served as an expert witness at trials. Several far-right journalists were convicted by courts with the help of Girenko's testimony as an expert witness. Members of nationalist groups voiced irritation in their press with Girenko's work.

Girenko took part in the trial of the ultra-nationalist newspaper Russian Veche (Russian: Русское вече) in 2004 as an expert witness. He provided expert examinations of publications of the Shultz-88 group in another trial. He consulted with the investigators of the 2002 murder of the 53-year-old salesman Mamed Mamedov.

Two or more anonymous attackers, suspected to be Neo-Nazi youths, killed Girenko by a rifle shot through the entrance door of his St. Petersburg apartment on 19 June 2004, shortly after Girenko testified about Russian National Unity in the court.

== Murder investigation ==
Lev Borkin, Girenko's colleague, said that Girenko mentioned receiving threats. One night in November 2003, unknown individuals broke through the entrance to the office of Union of Scientists and left a note, "We will be whacking you, science freaks!".

Vladimir Popov, leader of the neo-Nazi group Russian Republic, claimed responsibility for the killing in an interview to the Agency of Journalistic Investigations on 24 June 2004. Popov said that a "death sentence" was given to Girenko by the group.

As of June 2005, the official investigation had found no suspects, according to the newspaper Tainy Sovetnik. Yelena Ordynskaya, senior assistant to the city Prosecutor, said the investigation found that Russian Republic published its "death sentence" to Girenko a few days after the murder.

The city court of Saint Petersburg sentenced 12 members of a Combat Terrorist Organization led by Voevodin and Borovikov.

== Homage to Girenko ==
The portal "Human Rights in Russia" organized a social campaign called "I don't want to hate". The authors of the campaign hope to overcome racism, ethnic discrimination and xenophobia. In Russia alone, more than 70 non-government organizations and 47 mass media editor offices are taking part in the campaign.

== See also ==
- Racism in Russia

== Scientific works ==
- Sociology of Tribe. Published by the Museum of Anthropology and Ethnography, St. Petersburg, 2005.
- Ethnos, Culture, Law. Published by the Museum of Anthropology and Ethnography and Civil Control, St. Petersburg, 2005.

Preceded by Position established	Director of the Peter the Great Museum of Anthropology and Ethnography; 1991–1992	Succeeded by Alexander Myl'nikov
