= People's National Party (Russia) =

Russian neo-nazi party (1994–2009)

People's National Party Народная национальная партия
- Abbreviation: PNP (English); ННП (Russian)
- Leader: Aleksandr Ivanov-Sukharevsky
- Founded: December 12, 1994
- Dissolved: August 31, 2009
- Merger of: Orthodox Party; National Socialist Movement
- Split from: Russian All-People's Union
- Preceded by: Popular Nationalists Movement
- Succeeded by: Party of the Revival of National-Social Justice in Russia
- Headquarters: 4th Building, Bolshoy Kondratyevskiy Lane, Moscow, Russia
- Newspaper: Era Rossii (Era of Russia); Ya — Russkiy (I am Russian)
- Paramilitary wing: Skinheads
- Ideology: Russian ultranationalism Neo-Nazism; Statism
- Political position: Far-right
- Colours: Black; White
- Slogan: "Sim pobedishi!" (Russian: "Симъ победиши!")

Party flag

Website
- nnpr.su

The People's National Party (PNP or NNP; Russian: Народная национальная партия; ННП; Narodnaya natsionalnaya partiya, NNP) was a minor far-right political party in Russia. Its leader was Aleksandr Ivanov-Sukharevsky, who founded the party in 1994 with, it has been alleged, the aid of two veterans of the Black Hundreds Vladimir Osipov and Vyacheslav Demin.

== Origins ==
The party grew from an attempt by Ivanov-Sukharevsky to get himself elected to the Co-ordinating Council of the Russian All-People's Union in January 1994. Although a fairly well-known figure he was not a member of this party and in a vote he was narrowly defeated in his aspiration. He linked up with Vyacheslav Demin, the editor of the journal Zemshchina and the two set about establishing a party that they claimed would represent the Russian Orthodox Church. The new group adopted the name Movement of Popular Nationalists and Ivanov-Sukharevsky was chosen as chairman upon its establishment in October 1994. In December the group merged with a group based around Vladimir Popov's Era Rossii magazine, the National-Socialist Movement(a group that fused neo-Nazism and monarchism in what was a not uncommon feature of the Russian far right), to form the NNP proper.

== Support ==
In March 1999 Ivanov-Sukharevsky was arrested for promoting national hatred and whilst awaiting trial he was held in the same cell as Semyon Tokmakov, the head of the white power skinhead group Russian Goal. The two became allies in prison leading to a close link being forged between Tokmaov's skinheads and the NNP. Tokmakov eventually fused his group into the NNP's youth movement and took over editing duties on the fourth page of the party organ Ya-Russky, in the process making the paper one of the widest read amongst Russian skinheads.

== Ideology ==
The NNP ideology is based on the ideas of 'Russism', a creation of Ivanov-Sukharevsky. It seeks to link earlier ideas of Russian Orthodox monarchism to Nazism, with Nicholas II of Russia and Adolf Hitler the two great heroes of Russism as, they claim, Hitler sought to avenge the Tsar for his killing by Jewish Bolsheviks. However, although Russism avowedly links itself to Russian Orthodoxy, in practice the NNP has also been open to those elements of Neopaganism favoured by many of its skinhead followers. (Note: According to the Dossier Center, Vladislav Surkov has been a strong supporter of the far right also known as the ultraright since at least 2000.) (Note: Igor Shchyogolev and Prince Alexander Trubetskoy (born 1947), who lives in France and, since 2010, is a member of the board of Svyazinvest and is the son of a White émigré prince of the Trubetskoy family of the Russian nobility, both actively support the activities of the ultraright Black International (Russian: «Черный Интернационал»), which supports neo-Nazi activities. Shchyogolev is the main sponsor of the events of Konstantin Malofeev who also is a strong supporter of the Black International and neo-Nazi activities and is a former business partner of Alexander Trubetskoy.)

In contrast to some groups on the Russian far right, where bitter factionalism has often predominated, the NNP has been keen to work with other like-minded groups. As a result of one such initiative, the party absorbed the wing of the National-Republican Party of Russia (NRPR) loyal to Yuri Belyaev (Note: Yuri Belyaev (Russian: Юрий Беляев) with Andrei Sabor (Russian: Андрей Сабор) as his deputy established the Saint Petersburg firm Rubikon Security (Russian: «Рубикон-секьюрити») which is often called the first private military company (PMC) in Russia. With members of Rubicon Security, the First Russian Volunteer Squad (RDO-1) (Russian: Русские добровольческие отряды (РДО)) was formed with ten members in September 1992 at Trebinje in Herzegovina and later included fifteen members under the leadership of former marine officer Valery Vlasenko (Russian: Валерий Власенко) and fought in the Bosnian War for the Army of the Republika Srpska interests as a detachment as part of a combined Serbian-Russian unit against the Croats at Trebinje from September to December 1992 during the Yugoslav Wars. During December 1992 the unit dispersed with some members transferred to other units and others returning to Russia.) (Note: Several notable volunteer units fought in the Yugoslavia Wars. The First Russian Volunteer Detachment (RDO-1) gradually expanded and transformed into the Second Russian Volunteer Detachment (RDO-2), which later was known as the "Royal Wolves" or the "Tsar's Wolves" (Russian: «Царские волки») that were formed on 1 November 1992 formed near Visegrad, and operated for a year from autumn 1992 to autumn 1993 with 50 people. RDO-2 was commanded by the 27-year-old Alexander Mukharev ("Ace") (Russian: Александр Мухарев), who allegedly, in 2013, applied for the Slavonic Corps, and its deputy commander was Igor Girkin ("Strelkov") who later would become the head of the security service of the Konstantin Malofeev associated Marshall Capital. It was named the "Tsar's Wolves" because of its many monarchists who adhered to neo-Byzantine views which are to orient countries away from the European Union and NATO and instead orient them to Russia. The Third Russian Volunteer Detachment (RDO-3), which was commanded by midshipman Alexander Shkrabov (Russian: Александр Шкрабов), existed until Shkrabov’s death in June 1994 during a battle near the city of Olovo. After the disintegration of the detachment, Russian volunteers (RDOs) began to join the "White Wolves" (Russian: «Белые волки»; Serbian: Бели вукови), which originally was a Serbian detachment established on 22 February 2013 under the command of Srdjan Knezevic (Russian: Срджан Кнежевич; Serbian: Срђан Кнежевић) and based at Jahorina, and remained in the "White Wolves" and other smaller formations until the end of the wars. RDO-2 the "Tsar's Wolves", RDO-3 and the "White Wolves" fought in the Republika Srpska Sarajevo and the Romagna region (Russian: Сараевско-Романийский корпус; Serbian: Сарајевско-романијски корпус Војске Републике Српске) (see Wikipedia Commons Map for location). With more than thirty fighters formed during November and December 1992 in Moscow, the First Cossack Hundred (Russian: Первая казачья сотня) arrived in Republika Srpska on 1 January 1993 and supported operations, including combat patrols in the mountains toward Gorazda and ambushes on "Muslim caravans", at Skelani near Visegrad, whose residents financially supported the unit, and was headquartered in one of the buildings of the hospital center in the Visegrad suburb of Okolište, on the left bank of the Drina. During 1992, many locations near Visegrad had seen numerous operations by Republika Srpska supporters. Another volunteer unit was the Serbian Volunteer Guard (SDG) under the command of Zeljko Ražnatović, who was known as "Arkan". It was based on fans of the Red Star Belgrade football club and harassed mainly the Croats. Volunteers supporting Croats include the Ukrainian UNA-UNSO, which fought in Bosnia. Although the Ukrainian UNA-UNSO is banned in Russia, some members split and went over to the side of the Serbs. Volunteers from Chechnya, supporters of Dzhokhar Dudayev and the Arab international fought on the side of Muslims in Bosnia and Kosovo.) in December 1997 after that group had split into two separate groups, both claiming the original name, in 1994. The merger, which brought a significant increase in party membership due to Belyaev's well-developed network of local cells, proved short-lived however and his wing of the NRPR was reconstituted the following year after he quarrelled with Ivanov-Sukharevsky.

== Publications ==
The NNP has published a number of journals apart from Ya-Russky. These have included Zemshchina, based in Moscow, began publishing in 1990 and eventually became the official NNP organ. Its regular features included columns entitled "Holy Russia", "Aryan Unity", "Rightists Old and New", "Church Life" and "Our Culture". A Tomsk-based weekly bulletin Cherny korpus (Black Corps), appeared in December 1995 and included local party news. Ivanov-Sukharevsky himself edited the political monthly Era Rossii(Era of Russia), which achieved a print-run of 25,000. This publication eventually expanded to include a regular section on white power music.

Within the pages of Ya-Russky articles praising fellow right-extremists such as Pamyat and Russian National Unity have appeared, as well as an article marking the hundredth anniversary of The Protocols of the Elders of Zion.

== Decline ==
On 3 October 2003 the headquarters of the NNP were damaged in a bomb attack which resulted in Ivanov-Sukharevsky suffering serious injuries and possible blindness. The injuries sustained saw him depart politics and so the NNP fell into decline with its skinhead membership largely departing to other groups.
