= Occupy Pedophilia =

Russian anti-gay hate group

- Оккупай педофиляй
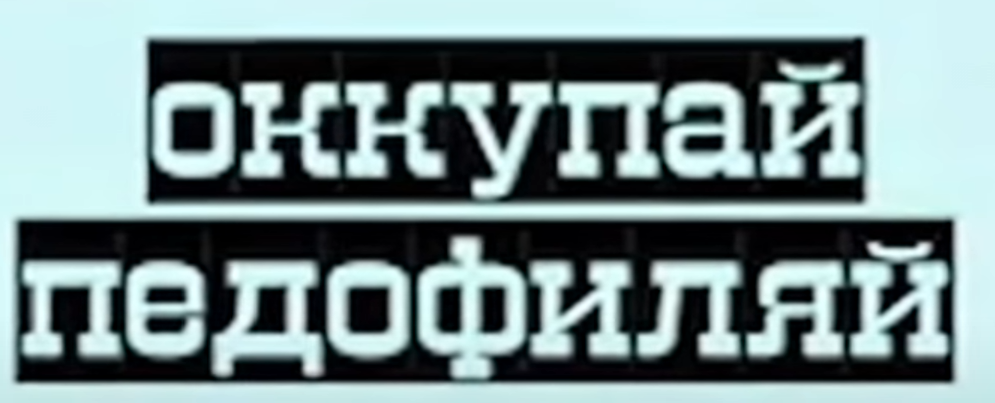
- Leader: Maxim Marcinkevich
- Dates active: Early 2010s
- Headquarters: Moscow
- Ideology: Neo-Nazism; Homophobia

Occupy Pedophilia (Russian: Оккупай-педофиляй, romanized: Okkupay-pedofilyay) was a far-right Russian anti-gay group, nominally anti-pedophilia, active throughout the 2010s. The group was founded by Russian neo-Nazi Maxim Martsinkevich.

== Activities ==
The group attracted attention by filming its attacks on gay men and some other victims and distributing the videos on the Internet. Victims were lured to private apartments by members of the group posing as LGBT people interested in romantic relationships. Some of the victims had their heads shaved and were forced to simulate oral sex.

According to an editorial in the academic journal Ethnoscripts, "Occupy Pedophilia" attacks began in Moscow and spread to Novosibirsk. Their activities reached a peak in 2013, at the time that the Russian gay propaganda law was passed. In 2014, Human Rights Watch reported that Occupy Pedophilia is the most prominent of a variety of Russian vigilante groups which commit violent attacks against LGBT people and post videos online, a phenomenon which began in late 2012. In 3 out of 114 videos analyzed, heterosexual men seeking sex with underage girls were also targeted.

According to the group's website, it has chapters in 22 cities in Russia and Ukraine, including St. Petersburg, Krasnodar, Kaliningrad, Ufa, Ryazan, Rostov-on-Don, Tula, Cheboksary, Perm, Orenburg, Omsk, Yoshkar-Ola, Veliky Novgorod, Pskov, Kazan, Samara, Magnitogorsk, Belgorod, and Kamensk-Uralsky. Other branches of the organization are listed on VKontakte but not on the organization's website. The most active chapters according to HRW include Krasnodar and St. Petersburg. By 3 December 2014, the group's main VKontakte page had more than 90,000 subscribers. In 2013, the group reached international notoriety when they targeted and subjected a 20 year old South African exchange student at Belgorod Technological University to homophobic abuse.

Occupy Pedophilia is profiled in Ben Steele's 2014 documentary Hunted: The War Against Gays in Russia, along with the similar group Parents of Russia. Steele filmed the group's planning sessions and physical attacks. Maxim Martsinkevich, the group's leader, was sentenced to more than five years in prison for incitement to ethnic or racial hatred unrelated to the anti-gay attacks, but his sentence was cut to three years on appeal in 2014.

Human Rights Watch reports that "The impact on victims of Occupy Pedophilia-style attacks can be severe." Some victims suffered broken bones and other serious injuries. Others developed depression or anxiety as a result of the attacks or stayed at home due to fear of attacks.

On 16 September 2020, Martsinkevich was found dead in a pre-trial detention centre in the Chelyabinsk region.

== Proyecto pilla-pilla ==
The Russian group inspired a similar group in Spain, called "Proyecto pilla-pilla" and started by a Ukrainian man named Mykola in November 2013. In groups of 10–20 people, the group accosted at least three homosexuals in Granollers and Les Franqueses del Vallès, humiliating the victims and posting videos of the attacks on social media. The attacks caused alarm in the local LGBT community as people feared for their safety. Four members of the group were arrested by the Spanish police and convicted for invasion of privacy and offenses against the human dignity of the victims. In 2018, the prosecutor recommended a 21-year sentence for Mykola, the maximum allowed under the law, and recommended that the offenders be required to pay 31,000 euros in compensation to each of the victims.
