= Semyon Tokmakov =

Russian nationalist leader (born 1975)

Semyon Valeryevich Tokmakov
- Born: Semyon Valeryevich; July 26, 1975 (age 50); Rybinsk, Russia
- Occupations: Activist; Security guard

Semyon Valeryevich Tokmakov (Russian: Семён Валерьевич Токмаков born 26 July 1975 in Rybinsk, Russia) is a figure in the Russian nationalist movement. Tokmakov was a leader of the nationalist organization Russian Goal. He achieved notoriety in 1998 when he and other neo-nazis attacked William Jefferson, a black United States Marine embassy guard in Moscow. Semyon was arrested for the attack, spending a year and a half in prison.

As of 2004, Tokmakov was referenced as the "youth leader" for Russia's People's National Party (Russia).

The anti-fascist Russian website Freedom-online.narod.ru claims that Tokmakov was born in the city of Rybinsk in 1978, and worked as a security guard and bank protector there.

== Media quotes from Tokmakov ==
- "Why have they all come here? They bring nothing but drugs and AIDS. Every day they harass and steal our women."
- "When you kill cockroaches, you don't feel sorry for them, do you?"

== Sources ==
- The Wandering Jew-Hater Southern Poverty Law Center.
