= Russian Goal =

Russian Goal (Russian: Русская Цель) is a militant far-right organization in Russia, at one time led by Semyon Tokmakov. The group achieved international notoriety in 1999 when its members, led by Tokmakov, attacked William Jefferson, an African American United States Marine embassy guard. Tokmakov was arrested for the attack, but amnestied after receiving a short jail sentence.
