= National Socialist Society =

National Socialist Society Национал-социалистическое общество
- Abbreviation: NSO (English); НСО (Russian)
- Leader: Political Council
- Founders: Dmitry Rumyantsev; Sergey Korotkikh
- Founded: January 12, 2004
- Banned: February 1, 2010
- Succeeded by: Ethnic National Union
- Headquarters: Russia
- Newspaper: Korpus (Corps)
- Paramilitary wing: Format18
- Ideology: Neo-Nazism; Russian ultranationalism
- Political position: Far-right
- Colours: Red; Black; White
- Slogan: "The future belongs to us!" (Russian: "Будущее принадлежит нам!") "Nobody except us!" (Russian: "Никто, кроме нас!")

Party flag

Website
- nso-korpus.org (banned)

The National Socialist Society (NSO; Russian: Национал-социалистическое общество; НСО; Natsional-sotsialisticheskoye obshchestvo, NSO) was an illegal Russian neo-Nazi organization founded in 2004 by Dmitry Rumyantsev and Sergei "Malyuta" Korotkikh. The National Socialist Society proclaimed the objective of the construction of a Russian nation state on the basis of Nazi ideology.

In July 2011, 13 members of the organization were found guilty of committing 28 racist murders and over 50 attacks on non-Russians and members of the LGBT community in Moscow.

== See also ==
- Combat Organization of Russian Nationalists
- Combat Terrorist Organization
- NS/WP Crew
- The Savior (paramilitary organization)
- Murder of Shamil Odamanov

== In popular culture ==
1. "From Russia with hate" A Vanguard series episode by Christof Putzel.
2. "Ross Kemp on Gangs. Moscow" TV documentary by Ross Kemp.
3. "Credit for Murder" documentary by Vlady Antonevicz.
