= Combat Terrorist Organization =

Secretive Russian, neo-Nazi, former gang

- Founder: Dmitry Borovikov; Alexey Voyevodin
- Founding location: Saint Petersburg
- Years active: 2003–2006
- Territory: Saint Petersburg and Lenoblast, Russian Federation
- Ethnicity: Russians
- Membership: Around 13
- Leaders: D.A.Borovikov, A.M. Voyevodin
- Activities: hate crime, murder, robbery, terrorism
- Notable members: D.A. Borovikov

The Combat Terrorist Organization (Russian: Боевая террористическая организация, romanized: Boyevaya terroristicheskaya organizatsiya) was a short-lived Russian neo-Nazi gang active from 9 August 2003 to 2006. It was formed in Saint Petersburg by two members of the Mad Crowd skinhead group, namely, Dmitry Borovikov and Alexey Voyevodin.

Compared to other Russian neo-Nazi groups, the CTO remained relatively secretive. The group also used confidential mobile phones to communicate. The CTO rarely met in the open and avoided talking about ideology or tactics near power sockets, preferring to write their words on paper. In contrast to other neo-fascist groups of the time, there were no skinheads among its members.

== History ==
On June 14, 2011, the trial of eight members of the group began, with member Pavel Rumyantsev tried separately.

On October 20, 2006, the St. Petersburg City Court tried of nine out of 17 men acquitted for murdering Vietnamese national Vu Anh Tuan in 2004.

On December 4, 2025, police in St. Petersburg arrested Sergei Netronin as the main suspect in the murder of North Korean national Kim Hyon Ik, who was killed on December 14, 2003.

== Ideology ==
The gang's main symbol was the swastika. By means of murder and terrorism, Dmitry Borovikov waged a campaign "to clear" St. Petersburg ("Nevograd") of non-white races such as Black, Armenoid, and Asians, who "fuck Russian women" and "by that profane race, give birth to bastards." His dream was allegedly to overthrow "the Jewish Russian Federation" and turn it into a monoethnic "Nordic Russia." The group sharply criticised Christianity while promoting neo-pagan ideology as an alternative. The group also introduced a propaganda that focused on the value of a healthy lifestyle and refusal of alcohol and drugs. Most members of the group were convinced hardline straight edgers. The group issued fanzines with titles such as Kill or To Be Killed, Straight Edge - Шторм Чистой Крови, Гнев Перуна, Smell of Hatred.

== Weapons ==
The main weapons used by the gang were knives, crossbows, and guns such as rifles (including Mosin rifles) and pump-action shotguns.

Voyevodin, one of the gang's leaders, inherited two apartments following the deaths of his mother and grandmother. He sold one of the apartments and used the proceeds to purchase a car, four Saiga carbines, and radio sets to listen to police radio.

== Attacks ==
- Armenian citizens Makvela Elamiryana and Liana Tumanyan on August 9, 2003, at the Nikolskoye settlement.
- Nigerian citizen Omordion Lavrense on October 2, 2003, at Tankista Khrustitskogo Street.
- A citizen from Georgia at Bolshaya Monetnaya Street and a Pakistani citizen on Leo Tolstoy Street on November 11, 2003.

== Murders ==
Date	Place	Name and age	Citizenship	Notes
9 November 2003	Kollontay Street	S. V. Bulantsov	Russia	Stabbed to death
14 December 2003	18 Marat Street	Kim Hyun-ik	North Korea	Killed with cold weapon and scraps of pipes. Group members stole more than 300,000 rubles from the victim
9 February 2004	Boytsova Lane	Hursheda Sultonova (8)	Tajikistan	Stabbed to death, it is not confirmed if she was killed by the gang, but there were lots of suspects, this is the only case of the list that remains an unconfirmed homicide.
7 June 2004	Zakhodskoye settlement	Rostislav Gofman (19) and Alexey Golovchenko (19)	Russia	Killed with knives and an arbalest, a type of crossbow.
19 June 2004	Victim's apartment	Nikolai Girenko (63)	Russia	Shot through a door
7 April 2006	Gorokhovaya Street	Samba Lampsar (28)	Cameroon	Shot in the neck with a pump-action shotgun

== Sentences ==
No.	Name	Charge	Sentence
1	Dmitry Borovikov	Murder, incitement to hatred, public calls for extremist activity, brigandage, banditry, robbery, terrorism	Killed during his arrest
2	Alexey Voyevodin	Murder, brigandage, terrorism, incitement to hatred, banditry, public calls for extremist activity	Life imprisonment
3	Pavel Gusev	Murder	Acquitted
4	Alexey Kostrachenkov	Murder	18 years
5	Andrey Kostrachenkov	Murder	8 years
6	Andrey Malyugin	Murder	18 years
7	Roman Orlov	Murder	11 years 6 months
8	Artyom Prokhorenko	Robbery, murder, incitement to hatred, public calls for extremist activity	Life imprisonment
9	Pavel Rumyantsev	Murder, incitement to hatred	Compulsory psychiatric treatment
10	Denis Kharchev	Murder	7 years 2 months (the term is reduced)

== See also ==
- Combat Organization of Russian Nationalists
- NS/WP Crew
- The Savior (paramilitary organization)
- National Socialist Society
- Primorsky Partisans
